= Derbyshire County Cricket Club in 1986 =

1986 season of an English cricket team

Derbyshire County Cricket Club seasons
1986 season
- Captain: Kim Barnett
- County Championship: 11
- John Player League: 9
- National Westminster Bank Trophy: Round 2
- Benson & Hedges Cup.: Quarter-final
- Most runs: John Morris
- Most wickets: Michael Holding
- Most catches: Chris Marples

The Derbyshire County Cricket Club had been playing for one hundred and sixteen years by the 1986 cricket season. That year they won five matches to finish eleventh in their eighty-second season in the County Championship. They came ninth in the John Player League and reached round 2 in the National Westminster Bank Trophy. They reached the quarter-final of the Benson & Hedges Cup.

== 1986 season ==
Derbyshire played twenty-four matches in the County Championship and one against the touring New Zealanders. They won five first class matches overall all in the championship. They won seven and lost nine matches in the Sunday league. After winning all their matches in Group A, Derbyshire went through to the quarter-final of the Benson & Hedges Cup.

Kim Barnett was in his third season as captain. John Morris was top scorer although Barnett scored most runs in the one-day game. Michael Holding took most wickets.

The team set a first-class record partnership for the 10th wicket during the season when Alan Hill and Martin Jean-Jacques made 132 against Yorkshire at Sheffield.

== Matches ==
=== First Class ===
List of matches
No.	Date	V	Result	Margin	Notes
1	26 Apr 1986	Middlesex; Lord's Cricket Ground, St John's Wood	Drawn		Radley 103
2	30 Apr 1986	Somerset; Queen's Park, Chesterfield	Drawn		B Roberts 124; PG Newman 5-62
3	24 May 1986	Nottinghamshire; County Ground, Derby	Drawn		Rice 120; Hadlee 6-31; Afford 5-71
4	31 May 1986	Essex; County Ground, Derby	Lost	116 runs	Border 110; Lever 5-32
5	4 Jun 1986	Yorkshire; Abbeydale Park, Sheffield	Won	99 runs	A Hill 172; MA Holding 5-28
6	7 Jun 1986	Surrey; Kennington Oval	Lost	9 wickets	Clarke 5-43
7	14 Jun 1986	Gloucestershire; Wagon Works Ground, Gloucester	Drawn		Lloyds 111; DE Malcolm 5-42
8	21 Jun 1986	Gloucestershire; Queen's Park, Chesterfield	Drawn		Stovold 118; KJ Barnett 114; Walsh 7-62
9	28 Jun 1986	Lancashire; Aigburth, Liverpool	Drawn		JE Morris 153
10	2 Jul 1986	Worcestershire; County Ground, Derby	Drawn		Newport 6-49; MA Holding 7-97; Illingworth 5-64
11	5 Jul 1986	Kent; County Ground, Derby	Won	28 runs	JE Morris 191; Alderman 8-46; M Jean-Jacques 8-77; G Miller 5-77
12	16 Jul 1986	Warwickshire; Edgbaston, Birmingham	Drawn		G Miller 5-37
13	19 Jul 1986	Middlesex; County Ground, Derby	Won	1 wicket	Slack 100; OH Mortensen 5-35
14	23 Jul 1986	Hampshire; United Services Recreation Ground, Portsmouth	Lost	5 runs	Greenidge 144; MA Holding 5-89; Tremlett 5-46
15	26 Jul 1986	Glamorgan; Pen-y-Pound, Abergavenny	Won	3 wickets	
16	2 Aug 1986	New Zealand; County Ground, Derby	Drawn		Maher 126; Edgar 110
17	6 Aug 1986	Sussex; The Saffrons, Eastbourne	Lost	3 wickets	A Hill 130; PArker 100
18	9 Aug 1986	Lancashire; Park Road Ground, Buxton	Drawn		
19	16 Aug 1986	Yorkshire; Queen's Park, Chesterfield	Drawn		MA Holding 5-46
20	20 Aug 1986	Leicestershire; Queen's Park, Chesterfield	Drawn		Whittaker 175; RJ Finney 7-54
21	23 Aug 1986	Nottinghamshire; Trent Bridge, Nottingham	Drawn		Hemmings 5-107
22	27 Aug 1986	Leicestershire; Grace Road, Leicester	Drawn		Willey 168; JE Morris 118; Whittaker 106; DeFreitas 5-92
23	30 Aug 1986	Hampshire; County Ground, Derby	Lost	9 wickets	KJ Barnett 98; Greenidge 103 and 180; A Hill 119 Marshall 5-49
24	3 Sep 1986	Northamptonshire; County Ground, Derby	Drawn		Lamb 159; Bailey 114; KJ Barnett 143; JE Morris 127; Capel 7-86
25	13 Sep 1986	Somerset; County Ground, Taunton	Won	3 wickets	(single innings match)

=== John Player League ===
List of matches
No.	Date	V	Result	Margin	Notes
1	4 May 1986	Leicestershire; Grace Road, Leicester	Lost	19 runs	Potter 105
2	11 May 1986	Sussex; County Ground, Derby	Won	8 wickets	
3	18 May 1986	Warwickshire; Highfield, Leek	Lost	5 wickets	
4	1 Jun 1986	Essex; County Ground, Derby	Lost	8 wickets	Foster 5-17
5	8 Jun 1986	Surrey; Kennington Oval	Won	3 wickets	
6	15 Jun 1986	Gloucestershire; Wagon Works Ground, Gloucester	Won	5 wickets	
7	6 Jul 1986	Kent; County Ground, Derby	Lost	11 runs	
8	13 Jul 1986	Northamptonshire; Dolben Cricket Ground, Finedon	Lost	97 runs	Wild 5-7
9	20 Jul 1986	Middlesex; County Ground, Derby	Won	7 wickets	
10	27 Jul 1986	Glamorgan; Eugene Cross Park, Ebbw Vale	Lost	4 runs	H Morris 100
11	10 Aug 1986	Lancashire; Park Road Ground, Buxton	Won	3 wickets	
12	17 Aug 1986	Yorkshire; Queen's Park, Chesterfield	Won	10 wickets	
13	24 Aug 1986	Nottinghamshire; Trent Bridge, Nottingham	Lost	23 runs	Broad 104
14	31 Aug 1986	Hampshire; Town Ground, Heanor	Lost	73 runs	
15	7 Sep 1986	Worcestershire; County Ground, New Road, Worcester	Won	1 wicket	
16	14 Sep 1986	Somerset; County Ground, Taunton	Lost	3 wickets	

=== National Westminster Bank Trophy ===
List of matches
No.	Date	V	Result	Margin	Notes
1st Round	25 Jun 1986	Cornwall; County Ground, Derby	Won	204 runs	S Anderson 134; A Hill 153
2nd Round	9 Jul 1986	Surrey; County Ground, Derby	Lost	62 runs	

=== Benson and Hedges Cup ===
List of matches
No.	Date	V	Result	Margin	Notes
Group A 1	3 May 1986	Leicestershire; Queen's Park, Chesterfield	Won	Faster rate	
Group A 2	10 May 1986	Northamptonshire; County Ground, Northampton	Won	38 runs	
Group A 3	15 May 1986	Minor Counties cricket team County Ground, Derby	Won	7 wickets	
Group A 4	17 May 1986	Warwickshire; Edgbaston, Birmingham	Won	3 wickets	
Quarter Final	28 May 1986	Kent; County Ground, Derby	Lost	4 wickets	

== Statistics ==
=== Competition batting averages ===
Name	County Championship						John Player League						NWB Trophy						B & H Cup					
Name	M	I	Runs	HS	Ave	100	M	I	Runs	HS	Ave	100	M	I	Runs	HS	Ave	100	M	I	Runs	HS	Ave	100
S Anderson	13	23	449	93	20.40	0	9	8	163	63	23.28	0	2	2	134	134	67.00	1	5	5	117	42	23.40	0
KJ Barnett	24	42	1484	143	38.05	2	16	16	700	92	53.84	0	2	2	73	47	36.50	0	5	5	141	62	28.20	0
AM Brown	1	2	30	21	30.00	0																		
RJ Finney	16	16	275	54	25.00	0	11	7	72	24*	18.00	0	1	0					5	2	19	12*		0
A Hill	24	40	1438	172*	42.29	3	15	15	296	50	21.14	0	2	2	169	153	84.50	1	5	5	210	90*	70.00	0
MA Holding	14	20	295	36*	16.38	0	14	11	86	27	8.60	0	2	1	0	0	0.00	0	5	3	75	69	25.00	0
M Jean-Jacques	9	12	208	73	23.11	0	4	2	1	1	0.50	0	2	1	16	16	16.00	0						
BJM Maher	13	23	626	77*	34.77	0	8	7	120	45	20.00	0												
DE Malcolm	8	6	30	29*	15.00	0	2	1	16	16	16.00	0												
C Marples	14	23	442	57	22.10	0	4	4	55	42	13.75	0												
G Miller	19	26	461	65	19.20	0	13	10	170	73*	24.28	0	1	1	32	32*		0	5	3	86	32	86.00	0
JE Morris	24	38	1654	191	47.25	4	16	14	293	66*	22.53	0	2	2	12	12*	12.00	0	5	5	90	65	18.00	0
OH Mortensen	16	17	69	31*	8.62	0	15	7	7	3*	7.00	0	1	1	11	11	11.00	0	5	0				
PG Newman	3	4	62	34	31.00	0	3	2	24	23	12.00	0	1	0					4	1	7	7	7.00	0
B Roberts	24	36	771	124*	23.36	1	16	14	372	60*	33.81	0	2	2	14	12	14.00	0	5	5	191	86*	63.66	0
CFBP Rudd	1	1	1	1	1.00	0																		
PE Russell							3	1	1	1	1.00	0	1	0					2	1	6	6*		0
R Sharma	15	17	321	71	29.18	0	12	9	101	37	16.83	0	2	1	9	9	9.00	0	1	1	2	2	2.00	0
JP Taylor	3	4	9	6	3.00	0	2	0																
AE Warner	19	27	543	91	25.85	0	13	9	121	68	20.16	0	1	1	6	6	6.00	0	3	1	17	17*		0
LJ Wood	2	2	7	5	3.50	0																		
JG Wright	2	3	14	7	4.66	0																		

=== Competition bowling averages ===
Name	County Championship					John Player League					NWB Trophy					B & H Cup				
Name	Balls	Runs	Wkts	Best	Ave	Balls	Runs	Wkts	Best	Ave	Balls	Runs	Wkts	Best	Ave	Balls	Runs	Wkts	Best	Ave
KJ Barnett	570	333	5	1-8	66.60						67	34	3	3-34	11.33					
RJ Finney	1810	986	28	7-54	35.21	450	339	14	3-40	24.21	36	25	1	1-25	25.00	222	108	3	2-26	36.00
A Hill	54	22	1	1-22	22.00						18	13	0							
MA Holding	2329	1045	52	7-97	20.09	666	435	21	3-16	20.71	108	32	1	1-24	32.00	288	136	7	2-13	19.42
M Jean-Jacques	954	599	22	8-77	27.22	180	170	5	3-36	34.00	102	57	4	3-43	14.25					
BJM Maher	198	151	3	2-69	50.33															
DE Malcolm	1220	735	27	5-42	27.22	96	87	3	2-40	29.00										
C Marples	24	48	0																	
G Miller	3626	1340	32	5-37	41.87	468	316	5	2-22	63.20	72	30	2	2-30	15.00	240	132	5	2-13	26.40
JE Morris	268	245	1	1-103	245.00															
OH Mortensen	2498	1082	46	5-35	23.52	720	493	14	3-18	35.21	60	47	1	1-47	47.00	300	133	9	3-17	14.77
PG Newman	439	198	9	5-62	22.00	96	72	3	3-38	24.00	36	13	1	1-13	13.00	170	96	5	2-27	19.20
B Roberts	132	53	2	1-11	26.50	132	128	3	1-28	42.66										
CFBP Rudd	171	90	0																	
PE Russell						78	47	0			54	20	0			42	26	1	1-18	26.00
R Sharma	845	407	11	3-72	37.00	228	203	1	1-39	203.00	120	52	4	4-29	13.00					
JP Taylor	432	254	6	4-81	42.33	54	44	3	3-14	14.66										
AE Warner	2047	1186	28	4-38	42.35	576	520	18	3-38	28.88	36	49	0			142	150	5	3-67	30.00
LJ Wood	234	95	2	2-82	47.50															

=== Wicket Keeping ===
Chris Marples

County Championship Catches 30, Stumping 3
John Player League Catches 1, Stumping 0

Bruce Roberts

County Championship Catches 12, Stumping 1
National Westminster Trophy Catches 2, Stumping 0
Benson and Hedges Cup Catches 1, Stumping 1

== See also ==
- Derbyshire County Cricket Club seasons
- 1986 English cricket season
