= Derbyshire County Cricket Club in 1988 =

1988 season of an English cricket team

Derbyshire County Cricket Club seasons
1988 season
- Captain: Kim Barnett
- County Championship: 15
- Refuge Assurance League: 12
- National Westminster Bank Trophy: Quarter-final
- Benson & Hedges Cup.: Runners-up
- Most runs: Kim Barnett
- Most wickets: Michael Holding
- Most catches: Bernie Maher

Derbyshire County Cricket Club in 1988 was the cricket season when the English club Derbyshire had been playing for one hundred and eighteen years. They reached the final of the Benson & Hedges Cup and reached the quarter-finals in the National Westminster Bank Trophy. In the County Championship, they won four matches to finish fifteenth in their eighty-second season in the Championship. They came twelfth in the Refuge Assurance League

== 1988 season ==
Derbyshire played twenty two matches in the County Championship one against Cambridge University and one against the touring Sri Lankans. They won five first class matches overall and four in the championship. They won five and lost eight matches in the Sunday league.

Kim Barnett was in his third season as captain and was top scorer. Michael Holding took most wickets overall although Devon Malcolm who hardly figured in the one-day game took most wickets in the Championship.

== Matches ==
=== First Class ===
List of matches
No.	Date	V	Result	Margin	Notes
1	16 Apr 1988	Cambridge University; FP Fenner's Ground, Cambridge	Won	Innings and 214 runs	KJ Barnett 151; PD Bowler 155
2	21 Apr 1988	Leicestershire; County Ground, Derby	Drawn		BJM Maher 121; Whittaker 145; Potter 107; Lewis 5-73
3	28 Apr 1988	Yorkshire; Headingley, Leeds	Won	5 wickets	Jarvis 5-49; PG Newman 8-29
4	5 May 1988	Essex; Queen's Park, Chesterfield	Drawn		Border 169; PD Bowler 159; Topley 7-75 and 5-104
5	21 May 1988	Glamorgan; St Helen's, Swansea	Drawn		JE Morris 175
6	28 May 1988	Nottinghamshire; County Ground, Derby	Drawn		Stephenson 6-54 and 6-59; OH Mortensen 5-14
7	4 Jun 1988	Sussex; Cricket Field Road Ground, Horsham	Won	1 wicket	DE Malcolm 5-52
8	11 Jun 1988	Gloucestershire; County Ground, Derby	Lost	4 wickets	KJ Barnett 175; Wright 136; Curran 6-103 and 6-59
9	18 Jun 1988	Worcestershire; County Ground, Derby	Drawn		Neale 125; Rhodes 108;
10	25 Jun 1988	Surrey; Kennington Oval	Drawn		PD Bowler 158
11	2 Jul 1988	Middlesex; County Ground, Derby	Drawn		OH Mortensen 6-35
12	13 Jul 1988	Essex; Southchurch Park, Southend-on-Sea	Lost	9 wickets	KJ Barnett 99; Foster 6-96
13	16 Jul 1988	Northamptonshire; County Ground, Derby	Won	144 runs	OH Mortensen 5-28
14	20 Jul 1988	Leicestershire; Grace Road, Leicester	Drawn		KJ Barnett 239; Briers 125
15	23 Jul 1988	Hampshire; United Services Recreation Ground, Portsmouth	Drawn		Maru 5-69
16	30 Jul 1988	Warwickshire; County Ground, Derby	Drawn		JG Wright 154; Merrick 6-29; DE Malcolm 6-68
17	6 Aug 1988	Somerset; Clarence Park, Weston-super-Mare	Won	183 runs	
18	13 Aug 1988	Kent; Queen's Park, Chesterfield	Drawn		Tavare 119; Cowdrey 108
19	17 Aug 1988	Yorkshire; Queen's Park, Chesterfield	Drawn		Metcalfe 115; KJ Barnett 109
20	20 Aug 1988	Lancashire; Old Trafford, Manchester	Drawn		Atherton 115; Watkinson 6-50
21	25 Aug 1988	Northamptonshire; County Ground, Northampton	Drawn		Bailey 110; OH Mortensen 6-40
22	31 Aug 1988	Sri Lanka; County Ground, Derby	Drawn		
23	9 Sep 1988	Nottinghamshire; Trent Bridge, Nottingham	Lost	Innings and 41 runs	JE Morris 106; Newell 105; Randall 237; Stephenson 5-91
24	14 Sep 1988	Lancashire; County Ground, Derby	Drawn		KJ Barnett 157; Fowler 172; Hayhurst 107; PD Bowler 134

=== Refuge Assurance League ===
List of matches
No.	Date	V	Result	Margin	Notes
1	24 Apr 1988	Leicestershire; County Ground, Derby	Won	9 wickets	
2	1 May 1988	Yorkshire; Headingley, Leeds	No Result		
3	8 May 1988	Essex; County Ground, Derby	Lost	59 runs	Topley 5-25
4	22 May 1988	Glamorgan; Rodney Parade, Newport	Lost	25 runs	
5	29 May 1988	Nottinghamshire; County Ground, Derby	Won	9 wickets	
6	5 Jun 1988	Sussex; Cricket Field Road Ground, Horsham	Won	5 runs	
7	12 Jun 1988	Gloucestershire; Town Ground, Heanor	Lost	42 runs	
8	19 Jun 1988	Worcestershire; Victoria and Knypersley Social Welfare Centre, Knypersley	Lost	69 runs	
9	26 Jun 1988	Surrey; Kennington Oval	Tied		
10	3 Jul 1988	Middlesex; Repton School Ground	No Result		
11	24 Jul 1988	Hampshire; United Services Recreation Ground, Portsmouth	Lost	4 wickets	Bakker 5-26
12	31 Jul 1988	Warwickshire; County Ground, Derby	Lost	8 runs	
13	7 Aug 1988	Somerset; Clarence Park, Weston-super-Mare	Won	2 runs	
14	14 Aug 1988	Kent; Queen's Park, Chesterfield	Lost	6 wickets	
15	21 Aug 1988	Lancashire; Old Trafford, Manchester	Lost	2 runs	
16	28 Aug 1988	Northamptonshire; County Ground, Northampton	Won	5 runs	

=== National Westminster Bank Trophy ===
List of matches
No.	Date	V	Result	Margin	Notes
1st Round	22 Jun 1988	Sussex; County Ground, Hove	Won	6 wickets	MA Holding 8-21
2nd Round	25 Jun 1988	Cheshire; Boughton Hall Cricket Club Ground, Chester	Won	87 runs	OH Mortensen 5-15
Quarter Final	27 Jul 1988	Hampshire; County Ground, Derby	Lost	4 wickets	

=== Benson and Hedges Cup ===
List of matches
No.	Date	V	Result	Margin	Notes
Group A 1	26 Apr 1988	Scotland; Hamilton Crescent, Glasgow	Won	7 wickets	
Group A 2	3 May 1988	Warwickshire; County Ground, Derby	No Result		
Group A 3	10 May 1988	Lancashire; Aigburth, Liverpool	Won	5 wickets	
Group A 4	14 May 1988	Leicestershire; County Ground, Derby	Won	6 wickets	
Quarter Final	25 May 1988	Middlesex; County Ground, Derby	Won	9 wickets	DE Malcolm 5-27
Semi Final	8 Jun 1988	Glamorgan; St Helen's, Swansea	Won	14 runs	MA Holding 5-31
Final	9 Jul 1988	Hampshire; Lord's Cricket Ground, St John's Wood	Lost	7 wickets	Jeffries 5-13

== Statistics ==
=== Competition batting averages ===
Name	County Championship						Refuge Assurance League						NWB Trophy						B & H Cup					
Name	M	I	Runs	HS	Ave	100	M	I	Runs	HS	Ave	100	M	I	Runs	HS	Ave	100	M	I	Runs	HS	Ave	100
CJ Adams	1	1	21	21	21.00	0																		
KJ Barnett	17	27	1406	239*	56.24	4	13	13	501	90*	45.54	0	3	3	82	49	27.33	0	7	6	347	85	69.40	0
SJ Base	7	9	51	15	8.50	0	7	4	4	3	1.33	0												
PD Bowler	22	40	1563	159*	43.41	3	16	14	292	44	20.85	0	3	3	65	46	21.66	0	7	6	191	64	31.83	0
RJ Finney	3	5	142	52*	47.33	0	2	1	15	15	15.00	0							3	0				
SC Goldsmith	22	37	956	89	28.96	0	16	14	299	61	23.00	0	3	3	21	10	7.00	0	7	5	64	27*	16.00	0
FA Griffith	4	6	87	37	17.40	0	5	5	29	9	7.25	0												
MA Holding	11	12	129	30*	12.90	0	14	12	184	53	15.33	0	3	2	1	1	0.50	0	7	4	74	35*	37.00	0
M Jean-Jacques	3	4	5	5	1.25	0	3	2	20	13	10.00	0	1	0										
BJM Maher	22	38	920	121*	28.75	1	16	14	193	36*	21.44	0	3	3	69	44	34.50	0	7	3	10	8	3.33	0
DE Malcolm	19	21	119	22	7.43	0							2	2	0	0	0.00	0	5	2	0	0*	0.00	0
JE Morris	21	35	1163	175	38.76	2	16	15	391	65	27.92	0	3	3	100	43*	50.00	0	7	5	137	48*	45.66	0
OH Mortensen	12	12	46	15	11.50	0	12	6	8	5	2.00	0	2	2	0	0*	0	0	5	1	0	0*		0
PG Newman	14	18	174	39	13.38	0	13	10	74	27*	14.80	0	3	2	18	15	9.00	0	7	2	25	15*	25.00	0
TJG O'Gorman	4	8	152	78	19.00	0	1	1	14	14	14.00	0												
B Roberts	22	37	903	71	27.36	0	16	16	367	59	28.23	0	3	3	87	57	29.00	0	7	6	84	44	21.00	0
R Sharma	9	13	275	80	25.00	0	9	8	121	33	17.28	0	2	1	4	4	4.00	0	1	0				
AE Warner	18	25	300	45	15.78	0	15	13	103	18	8.58	0	2	1	9	9	9.00	0	7	2	17	13	8.50	0
JG Wright	11	20	815	154*	42.89	1	2	2	19	15	9.50	0												

=== Competition bowling averages ===
Name	County Championship					Refuge Assurance League					NWB Trophy					B & H Cup				
Name	Balls	Runs	Wkts	Best	Ave	Balls	Runs	Wkts	Best	Ave	Balls	Runs	Wkts	Best	Ave	Balls	Runs	Wkts	Best	Ave
KJ Barnett	949	411	13	3-63	31.61	24	22	0												
SJ Base	990	654	17	4-74	38.47	282	166	8	2-20	20.75										
PD Bowler	1019	577	7	2-63	82.42	192	185	4	2-29	46.25	18	14	0			246	125	4	1-15	31.25
RJ Finney	270	131	0			24	16	0								36	23	1	1-5	23.00
SC Goldsmith	258	125	0			12	23	0												
FA Griffith	483	268	9	4-47	29.77	168	137	3	2-27	45.66										
MA Holding	1675	827	24	4-74	34.45	555	432	16	4-22	27.00	181	60	10	8-21	6.00	446	244	15	5-31	16.26
M Jean-Jacques	505	262	8	3-49	32.75	132	129	1	1-52	129.00	60	46	0							
DE Malcolm	2808	1642	50	6-68	32.84						126	72	1	1-48	72.00	282	149	8	5-27	18.62
JE Morris	31	19	0																	
OH Mortensen	1401	464	34	6-35	13.64	516	277	9	2-14	30.77	134	50	8	5-15	6.25	294	167	4	1-19	41.75
PG Newman	1841	877	32	8-29	27.40	546	418	13	3-30	32.15	179	68	4	2-15	17.00	384	199	5	2-21	39.80
B Roberts	594	300	8	2-17	37.50	198	251	13	3-35	19.30	18	5	0			30	12	0		
R Sharma	1250	559	7	1-0	79.85	162	135	5	3-35	27.00	78	33	1	1-17	33.00					
AE Warner	2496	1091	37	4-36	29.48	592	578	15	3-21	38.53	120	65	1	1-38	65.00	395	266	9	3-52	29.55

=== Wicket Keeping ===
Bernie Maher

County Championship Catches 51, Stumping 1
Refuge Assurance League Catches 13, Stumping 2
National Westminster Trophy Catches 9, Stumping 0
Benson and Hedges Cup Catches 9, Stumping 0

== See also ==
- Derbyshire County Cricket Club seasons
- 1988 English cricket season
