= Derbyshire County Cricket Club in 1990 =

1990 season of an English cricket team

Derbyshire County Cricket Club seasons
1990 season
- Captain: Kim Barnett
- County Championship: 12
- Refuge Assurance League: Winners
- National Westminster Bank Trophy: Round 2
- Benson & Hedges Cup.: Group
- Most runs: Kim Barnett
- Most wickets: Ian Bishop
- Most catches: Karl Krikken

Derbyshire County Cricket Club in 1990 represents the cricket season when the English club Derbyshire won the Refuge Assurance League winning twelve of their sixteen matches. The club had been playing for one hundred and nineteen years. In the County Championship, they won six matches to finish twelfth in their eighty-sixth season in the Championship. They were eliminated in round 2 of the National Westminster Bank Trophy and at group level in the Benson & Hedges Cup.

== 1990 season ==
Derbyshire played 22 games in the County Championship, one match against Cambridge University and one match against the touring New Zealanders and won seven first class matches altogether. Kim Barnett was captain for his seventh season. With dry conditions, the reduced size of the seam on the cricket ball and the extension of four-day cricket, the 1990 English cricket season was batsmen-friendly allowing them to build huge scores. Kim Barnett scored five centuries in the first class game and two in one-day events to make him top scorer. John Morris scored six centuries in first class and one in the one day game, and in both matches against Yorkshire three Derbyshire players made centuries. Ian Bishop took most wickets in the first class game at 59. Derbyshire had six wins in the championship but ended twelfth as on several occasions Barnett chose to make a (losing) game of it rather than playing for a draw. He declared against New Zealand on 30 for no wicket, declared at 250 behind against Leicestershire and chose not to play a second innings against Warwickshire. This emphasis on a faster game paid dividends in the Refuge Assurance League when Derbyshire won twelve matches to win the league for the first time. However they left both the Benson & Hedges Cup and the NWB Trophy in the early stages. Two Derbyshire records were set in the one day competitions. The opening partnership of Morris and Barnett against Somerset was a record 232 runs. Against Hampshire they made their lowest score of 61.

Dominic Cork made his debut for the club playing one match in what was to be the first of many seasons. Zahid Sadiq also made his debut. Adrian Kuiper joined Derbyshire for the season.

== Matches ==
=== First Class ===
List of matches
No.	Date	V	Result	Margin	Notes
1	18 Apr 1990	Cambridge University; FP Fenner's Ground, Cambridge	Won	243 runs	CJ Adams 111
2	26 Apr 1990	Nottinghamshire; Trent Bridge, Nottingham	Drawn		Broad 180
3	3 May 1990	Northamptonshire; County Ground, Northampton	Won	Innings and 51 runs	Three Northants players were unable to play in the second innings through injury
4	15 May 1990	Lancashire; County Ground, Derby	Lost	60 runs	MA Atherton 5-95
5	19 May 1990	Somerset; County Ground, Taunton	Won	146 runs	JE Morris 122 and 109
6	23 May 1990	Yorkshire; Queen's Park, Chesterfield	Won	144 runs	KJ Barnett 141; B Roberts 124; G Miller 6-45
7	26 May 1990	Nottinghamshire; County Ground, Derby	Drawn		JE Morris 103; French 105; Cooper 5-72
8	2 Jun 1990	New Zealanders; County Ground, Derby	Lost	82 runs	A Jones 121
9	6 Jun 1990	Surrey; Kennington Oval	Drawn		
10	16 Jun 1990	Warwickshire; County Ground, Derby	Lost	2 wickets	KJ Barnett 131; PD Bowler 120; JE Morris 103; Moody 168; Derbyshire chose not to play their second innings
11	20 Jun 1990	Leicestershire; Grace Road, Leicester	Lost	140 runs	Whittaker 116; Benjamin 101
12	30 Jun 1990	Gloucestershire; County Ground, Derby	Drawn		KJ Barnett 107
13	4 Jul 1990	Sussex; County Ground, Hove	Won	18 runs	KJ Barnett 123; IR Bishop 5-90; Both teams chose to play only one innings
14	7 Jul 1990	Lancashire; Aigburth, Liverpool	Drawn		KJ Barnett 109; PD Bowler 105
15	18 Jul 1990	Essex; Castle Park Cricket Ground, Colchester	Lost	9 wickets	Waugh 126; Foster 6-49
16	21 Jul 1990	Hampshire; United Services Recreation Ground, Portsmouth	Lost	48 runs	JE Morris 157; Marshall 7-47
17	25 Jul 1990	Worcestershire; County Ground, Derby	Drawn		SJ Base 6-105; Illingworth 5-59; Lampitt 5-34
18	4 Aug 1990	Kent; Queen's Park, Chesterfield	Won	10 wickets	Ward 124; PD Bowler 210; B Roberts 100; IR Bishop 6-71; M Jean-Jacques 6-60
19	8 Aug 1990	Northamptonshire; Queen's Park, Chesterfield	Drawn		AM Brown 139; Capel 103; Bailey 134
20	18 Aug 1990	Middlesex; County Ground, Derby	Won	171 runs	Mike Gatting 119; Emburey 5-32; SJ Base 5-28
21	23 Aug 1990	Essex; County Ground, Derby	Lost	Innings and 94 runs	Pritchard 103; Foster 5-39; Ilott 5-34
22	29 Aug 1990	Glamorgan; Sophia Gardens, Cardiff	Drawn		H Morris 160
23	7 Sep 1990	Yorkshire; North Marine Road Ground, Scarborough	Lost	4 wickets	JE Morris 109; CJ Adams 101; IR Bishop 103; Metcalfe 150; Robinson 150
24	18 Sep 1990	Leicestershire; County Ground, Derby	Drawn		TJG O'Gorman 100; IR Bishop 5-62; Lewis 6-58

=== Refuge Assurance League ===
List of matches
No.	Date	V	Result	Margin	Notes
1	22 Apr 1990	Sussex; County Ground, Hove	Won	6 wickets	
2	29 Apr 1990	Worcestershire; County Ground, Derby	Won	35 runs	
3	6 May 1990	Northamptonshire; County Ground, Northampton	Won	4 wickets	
4	13 May 1990	Yorkshire; Headingley, Leeds	Lost	6 wickets	Jarvis 5-18
5	20 May 1990	Somerset; County Ground, Taunton	Won	7 wickets	KJ Barnett 100; JE Morris 134
6	10 Jun 1990	Nottinghamshire; County Ground, Derby	Lost	4 wickets	Robinson 116
7	17 Jun 1990	Warwickshire; County Ground, Derby	Won	1 run	
8	24 Jun 1990	Surrey; Kennington Oval	Won	3 wickets	
9	1 Jul 1990	Gloucestershire; County Ground, Derby	Won	6 wickets	
10	8 Jul 1990	Lancashire; Old Trafford, Manchester	Won	5 runs	
11	15 Jul 1990	Leicestershire; Victoria and Knypersley Social Welfare Centre, Knypersley	Won	118 runs	
12	22 Jul 1990	Hampshire; United Services Recreation Ground, Portsmouth	Lost	189 runs	
13	29 Jul 1990	Glamorgan; St Helen's, Swansea	Won	6 wickets	
14	5 Aug 1990	Kent; Queen's Park, Chesterfield	Won	6 wickets	KJ Barnett 127
15	19 Aug 1990	Middlesex; County Ground, Derby	No Result		
16	26 Aug 1990	Essex; County Ground, Derby	Won	5 wickets	
17; Cup Semi Final	5 Sep 1990	Nottinghamshire; County Ground, Derby	Won	22 runs	
18; Cup Final	16 Sep 1990	Middlesex; Edgbaston, Birmingham	Lost	5 wickets	

=== National Westminster Bank Trophy ===
List of matches
No.	Date	V	Result	Margin	Notes
1st Round	27 Jun 1990	Shropshire; Queen's Park, Chesterfield	Won	7 wickets	
2nd Round	11 Jul 1990	Lancashire; County Ground, Derby	Lost	3 wickets	

=== Benson and Hedges Cup ===
List of matches
No.	Date	V	Result	Margin	Notes
Group B 1	24 Apr 1990	Sussex; County Ground, Derby	Lost	5 wickets	
Group B 2	1 May 1990	Somerset; County Ground, Taunton	Lost	7 runs	
Group B 3	10 May 1990	Minor Counties; Orleton Park, Wellington	Won	43 runs	
Group B 4	12 May 1990	Middlesex; County Ground, Derby	Won	8 runs	

Derbyshire also played a one-day match against the Indians at Queen's Park, Chesterfield on 16 Jul 1990, which India won by two wickets.

== Statistics ==
=== Competition batting averages ===
Name	County Championship						Refuge Assurance League						NWB Trophy						B & H Cup					
Name	M	I	Runs	HS	Ave	100	M	I	Runs	HS	Ave	100	M	I	Runs	HS	Ave	100	M	I	Runs	HS	Ave	100
CJ Adams	21	32	800	101	27.58	1	16	15	230	58*	25.55	0	2	1	0	0	0.00	0	4	4	80	44	26.66	0
KJ Barnett	22	36	1572	141	50.70	5	16	16	699	127	43.68	2	2	2	60	59	30.00	0	4	4	124	94	31.00	0
SJ Base	13	13	215	58	19.54	0	13	3	2	2	1.00	0							4	2	15	15*	15.00	0
IR Bishop	12	15	326	103*	29.63	1																		
PD Bowler	21	37	1408	210	42.66	3	14	14	469	54	36.07	0	2	2	16	14	8.00	0	4	4	263	109	65.75	1
AM Brown	7	11	379	139*	37.90	1																		
DG Cork	1	1	7	7	7.00	0																		
SC Goldsmith	11	16	216	34	14.40	0	12	9	104	50	26.00	0	2	1	21	21	21.00	0	3	2	49	45*	49.00	0
FA Griffith	1	1	1	1	1.00	0																		
M Jean-Jacques	10	11	80	25	11.42	0	4	0				0												
KM Krikken	21	28	426	77*	16.38	0	3	2	14	14	7.00	0												
AP Kuiper	10	15	288	48	19.20	0	16	16	433	62*	36.08	0	2	2	74	49	37.00	0	4	4	185	106*	92.50	1
DE Malcolm	9	6	44	20*	11.00	0	11	4	9	9	3.00	0	2	1	0	0	0.00	0	3	2	5	5	5.00	0
G Miller	13	13	208	47*	34.66	0	10	2	16	14*	16.00	0	2	1	0	0	0.00	0	2	0				
JE Morris	16	26	1353	157*	61.50	6	13	13	462	134	35.53	1	2	2	168	94*	168.00	0	4	4	152	123	38.00	1
OH Mortensen	11	11	20	5*	10.00	0	14	2	2	2*	0	0	2	1	0	0	0.00	0	4	1	2	2*	0	0
TJG O'Gorman	6	11	393	100	39.30	1	5	5	55	32	13.75	0							1	1	8	8	8.00	0
B Roberts	22	35	1038	124*	37.07	2	16	13	324	77*	36.00	0	2	2	45	31	45.00	0	4	3	55	46	27.50	0
ZA Sadiq	1	1	0	0	0.00	0																		
AE Warner	14	19	160	59	9.41	0	13	6	44	13*	11.00	0	2	1	1	1*	0	0	2	1	1	1*	0	0

=== Competition bowling averages ===
Name	County Championship					Refuge Assurance League					NWB Trophy					B & H Cup				
Name	Balls	Runs	Wkts	Best	Ave	Balls	Runs	Wkts	Best	Ave	Balls	Runs	Wkts	Best	Ave	Balls	Runs	Wkts	Best	Ave
CJ Adams	48	36	1	1-5	36.00															
KJ Barnett	1603	720	19	3-49	37.89	150	138	3	1-9	46.00						6	9	0		9.00
SJ Base	2487	1402	35	6-105	40.05	528	431	19	4-28	22.68						240	176	7	3-33	25.14
IR Bishop	2373	1087	59	6-71	18.42															
PD Bowler	48	56	1	1-48	56.00															
DG Cork	144	70	0																	
SC Goldsmith	672	347	7	2-105	49.57	90	97	0		6.46	62	43	1	1-20	43.00	60	38	3	3-38	12.66
FA Griffith	66	20	1	1-20	20.00															
M Jean-Jacques	1568	983	19	6-60	51.73	180	180	5	3-47	36.00										
AP Kuiper	651	325	9	4-69	36.11	468	501	19	3-50	26.36	96	45	1	1-20	45.00	226	235	3	3-71	78.33
DE Malcolm	1666	947	30	4-63	31.56	456	381	13	4-21	29.30	144	85	3	3-54	28.33	180	131	4	3-55	32.75
G Miller	2564	1285	31	6-45	41.45	432	397	6	2-22	66.16	132	87	1	1-56	87.00	132	88	1	1-46	88.00
JE Morris	120	123	1	1-17	123.00															
OH Mortensen	1808	764	32	4-22	23.87	612	318	9	3-16	35.33	138	51	4	3-29	12.75	240	131	2	1-43	65.50
B Roberts	42	26	0																	
AE Warner	2361	1330	33	3-56	40.30	510	462	12	3-18	38.50	144	84	5	4-39	16.80	198	126	8	3-31	15.75

=== Wicket Keeping ===
KM Krikken

County Championship Catches 58, Stumping 3
Refuge Assurance League Catches 2, Stumping 0

PD Bowler

County Championship Catches 15, Stumping 0
Refuge Assurance League Catches 22, Stumping 1
NWB Trophy Catches 3, Stumping 0
B & H Trophy Catches 3, Stumping 1

== See also ==
- Derbyshire County Cricket Club seasons
- 1990 English cricket season
