= Derbyshire County Cricket Club in 1983 =

1983 season of an English cricket team

Derbyshire County Cricket Club seasons
1983 season
- Captain: Barry Wood
- County Championship: 9
- John Player Special League: 6
- National Westminster Bank Trophy: R2
- Benson & Hedges Cup.: Group
- Most runs: Kim Barnett
- Most wickets: Ole Mortensen
- Most catches: Bob Taylor

Derbyshire County Cricket Club in 1983 was the cricket season when the English club Derbyshire had been playing for one hundred and twelve years. In the County Championship, they won seven matches to finish ninth in their seventy ninth season in the Championship. They came sixth in the John Player Special League. They did not progress from the group in the Benson & Hedges Cup and reached round two in the National Westminster Bank Trophy.

== 1983 season ==
Derbyshire played twenty four first class matches, which were all in the County Championship. They won seven matches and lost five in both the championship and in the Sunday league. They lost to Middlesex in the second round of the NWB Trophy and lost the only two matches which were completed in the Benson and Hedges Cup.

Barry Wood was captain, Kim Barnett was top scorer and Ole Mortensen took most wickets.

Bill Fowler made his first class debut for the club in the first of two seasons.

== Matches ==
=== First Class ===
List of matches
No.	Date	V	Result	Margin	Notes
1	30 Apr 1983	Gloucestershire; County Ground, Derby	Drawn		Stovold 181
2	4 May 1983	Leicestershire; Grace Road, Leicester	Drawn		
3	11 May 1983	Lancashire; Queen's Park, Chesterfield	Drawn		
4	28 May 1983	Nottinghamshire; Trent Bridge, Nottingham	Won	6 wickets	Single innings match
5	4 Jun 1983	Hampshire; County Ground, Derby	Drawn		C Smith 193; Jesty 187 Southern 5–60
6	8 Jun 1983	Middlesex; Uxbridge Cricket Club Ground	Lost	9 wickets	Butcher 179
7	11 Jun 1983	Leicestershire; County Ground, Derby	Lost	Innings and 4 runs	Ferris 5–29
8	15 Jun 1983	Essex; County Ground, Derby	Lost	Innings and 25 runs	McEwan 178
9	18 Jun 1983	Somerset; Recreation Ground, Bath	Won	123 runs	OH Mortensen 5–43
10	22 Jun 1983	Yorkshire; Abbeydale Park, Sheffield	Won	22 runs	Boycott 112; Carrick 5–45 and 7–44; OH Mortensen 6–27 and 5–62; DG Moir 5–114
11	25 Jun 1983	Middlesex; Queen's Park, Chesterfield	Lost	9 wickets	Edmonds 6–38
12	2 Jul 1983	Worcestershire; County Ground, Derby	Won	8 wickets	A Hill 137;
13	9 Jul 1983	Gloucestershire; Phoenix County Ground, Bristol	Drawn		Childs 6–81
14	13 Jul 1983	Warwickshire; Edgbaston, Birmingham	Won	10 wickets	A Hill 121; Gifford 6–77; DG Moir 5–44; RJ Finney 5–58
15	16 Jul 1983	Northamptonshire; County Ground, Derby	Drawn		Larkins 236; KJ Barnett 103
16	27 Jul 1983	Hampshire; United Services Recreation Ground, Portsmouth	Lost	6 wickets	Nicholas 100; Tremlett 6–82
17	30 Jul 1983	Kent; Queen's Park, Chesterfield	Drawn		Aslett 168 and 119; IS Anderson 112; KJ Barnett 106
18	6 Aug 1983	Sussex; The Saffrons, Eastbourne	Drawn		Pigott 6–22
19	13 Aug 1983	Somerset; County Ground, Derby	Drawn		G Miller 5–71
20	20 Aug 1983	Glamorgan; St Helen's, Swansea	Won	2 wickets	Hopkins 109
21	24 Aug 1983	Lancashire; Stanley Park, Blackpool	Drawn		Simmons 101*; A Hill 106; Hayes 127; G Miller 5–98
22	27 Aug 1983	Yorkshire; Queen's Park, Chesterfield	Drawn		Boycott 169; Carrick 5–122; MA Holding 5–48
23	7 Sep 1983	Nottinghamshire; County Ground, Derby	Won	100 runs	Cooper 5–32; MA Holding 5–53
24	10 Sep 1983	Surrey; Kennington Oval	Drawn		KJ Barnett 121; A Hill 111; MA Holding 5–54

=== John Player Special League ===
List of matches
No.	Date	V	Result	Margin	Notes
1	8 May 1983	Lancashire; Old Trafford, Manchester	Abandoned		
2	15 May 1983	Northamptonshire; County Ground, Derby	Won	78 runs	
3	22 May 1983	Essex; County Ground, Chelmsford	Abandoned		
4	5 Jun 1983	Warwickshire; Courtaulds Ground, Coventry	Won	5 wickets	JG Wright 108
5	12 Jun 1983	Leicestershire; County Ground, Derby	Lost	5 wickets	
6	26 Jun 1983	Middlesex; Queen's Park, Chesterfield	Lost	4 wickets	
7	3 Jul 1983	Worcestershire; County Ground, Derby	Won	4 wickets	
8	10 Jul 1983	Gloucestershire; Phoenix County Ground, Bristol	Won	3 wickets	
9	24 Jul 1983	Nottinghamshire; County Ground, Derby	Won	3 wickets	
10	31 Jul 1983	Kent; Queen's Park, Chesterfield	No Result		
11	7 Aug 1983	Sussex; The Saffrons, Eastbourne	Lost	2 runs	
12	14 Aug 1983	Somerset; Town Ground, Heanor	Won	8 wickets	KJ Barnett 100
13	21 Aug 1983	Glamorgan; St Helen's, Swansea	Lost	22 runs	
14	28 Aug 1983	Yorkshire; Park Avenue Cricket Ground, Bradford	Lost	2 wickets	
15	4 Sep 1983	Hampshire; County Ground, Derby	Won	8 runs	
16	11 Sep 1983	Surrey; Kennington Oval	Abandoned		

=== National Westminster Bank Trophy ===
List of matches
No.	Date	V	Result	Margin	Notes
1st Round	29 Jun 1983	Suffolk; Victory Ground, Bury St Edmunds	Won	6 wickets	
2nd Round	20 Jul 1983	Middlesex; County Ground, Derby	Lost	30 runs	

=== Benson and Hedges Cup ===
List of matches
No.	Date	V	Result	Margin	Notes
Group A 1	7 May 1983	Yorkshire; Queen's Park, Chesterfield	Abandoned		
Group A 2	14 May 1983	Warwickshire; Edgbaston, Birmingham	Lost	61 runs	Kallicharran 119; Willis 5–37
Group A 3	17 May 1983	Nottinghamshire; Trent Bridge, Nottingham	Lost	51 runs	
Group A 4	19 May 1983	Lancashire; County Ground, Derby	No Result		

== Statistics ==
=== Competition batting averages ===
Name	County Championship						John Player Special League						NWB Trophy						B & H Cup					
Name	M	I	Runs	HS	Ave	100	M	I	Runs	HS	Ave	100	M	I	Runs	HS	Ave	100	M	I	Runs	HS	Ave	100
IS Anderson	21	37	1233	112	37.36	1	13	12	257	54	21.41	0	2	2	75	47	37.50	0	2	1	32	32	32.00	0
KJ Barnett	24	40	1423	121	38.45	3	13	13	253	100*	21.08	1	2	2	123	88	61.50	0	3	2	35	30	17.50	0
RJ Finney	20	35	578	71	17.51	0	11	10	201	46*	33.50	0	2	2	19	14*	19.00	0	2	1	21	21	21.00	0
WP Fowler	17	26	591	91	24.62	0	11	9	143	37	15.88	0	2	1	7	7	7.00	0						
JH Hampshire	14	19	485	84	28.52	0	3	3	72	36*	36.00	0	1	1	35	35	35.00	0	2	1	83	83	83.00	0
A Hill	24	40	1311	137*	37.45	4	13	13	197	30	15.15	0	2	2	60	52	30.00	0	3	2	74	39	37.00	0
MA Holding	6	5	90	63	22.50	0	6	2	19	12	9.50	0	1	1	0	0	0.00	0						
BJM Maher	8	12	150	52	15.00	0	4	2	19	13*	19.00	0												
G Miller	21	30	699	84	30.39	0	11	11	264	55*	37.71	0	1	1	1	1*		0	3	2	57	41	28.50	0
DG Moir	17	21	224	53	12.44	0													1	1	3	3	3.00	0
JE Morris	10	20	361	58	19.00	0	9	8	168	61	21.00	0	1	1	7	7	7.00	0						
OH Mortensen	18	23	76	14*	9.50	0	12	4	5	3*		0	2	1	2	2*		0						
PG Newman	7	5	14	12	2.80	0	4	3	12	6	4.00	0							3	2	15	11*	15.00	0
S Oldham	15	17	177	39	13.61	0	8	3	11	5	5.50	0	2	1	6	6	6.00	0	3	2	2	2	1.00	0
RW Taylor	16	21	267	41*	17.80	0	9	6	31	13*	10.33	0	2	1	11	11	11.00	0	3	2	14	10*		0
CJ Tunnicliffe	17	25	461	91	18.44	0	11	8	97	33*	32.33	0	2	1	6	6	6.00	0	3	2	7	5	3.50	0
A Watts	2	2	39	33*	39.00	0																		
B Wood	3	2	22	18	11.00	0	3	3	63	36	21.00	0							3	2	26	26	13.00	0
JG Wright	4	3	107	60	35.66	0	2	2	175	108	87.50	1							2	2	5	5	2.50	0

=== Competition bowling averages ===
Name	County Championship					John Player Special League					NWB Trophy					B & H Cup				
Name	Balls	Runs	Wkts	Best	Ave	Balls	Runs	Wkts	Best	Ave	Balls	Runs	Wkts	Best	Ave	Balls	Runs	Wkts	Best	Ave
IS Anderson	168	146	1	1–45	146.00	30	15	2	2–15	7.50										
KJ Barnett	18	13	0																	
RJ Finney	1691	970	30	5–58	32.33	383	281	9	3–27	31.22	144	78	1	1–46	78.00					
WP Fowler	360	214	2	1–26	107.00	60	28	2	2–2	14.00										
JH Hampshire	12	4	0																	
A Hill	38	15	0																	
MA Holding	1014	451	21	5–48	21.47	220	124	9	3–19	13.77	72	50	2	2–50	25.00					
G Miller	2957	1278	37	5–71	34.54	391	251	10	2–12	25.10	72	28	3	3–28	9.33	174	91	1	1–19	91.00
DG Moir	2777	1385	40	5–44	34.62											18	21	0		
JE Morris	12	0	0																	
OH Mortensen	3111	1605	66	6–27	24.31	467	340	14	3–30	24.28	144	67	4	3–16	16.75					
PG Newman	533	321	7	3–0	45.85	192	99	9	4–21	11.00						162	119	4	4–55	29.75
S Oldham	2324	1120	31	4–56	36.12	324	269	11	4–21	24.45	144	79	4	2–32	19.75	162	115	5	2–53	23.00
CJ Tunnicliffe	2572	1372	39	4–30	35.17	372	296	9	3–30	32.88	144	79	1	1–46	79.00	132	84	3	2–30	28.00
A Watts	132	87	1	1–28	87.00															
B Wood	120	74	0			144	96	5	3–35	19.20						198	114	2	2–26	57.00

=== Wicket Keeping ===
- Bob Taylor

County Championship Catches 37, Stumping 2
John Player League Catches 4, Stumping 1
NWB Trophy Catches 4, Stumping 0
B & H Trophy Catches 4, Stumping 0

- Bernie Maher

County Championship Catches 13, Stumping 3
John Player League Catches 5, Stumping 1

== See also ==
- Derbyshire County Cricket Club seasons
- 1983 English cricket season
