= List of Derbyshire List A cricket records =

This is a list of Derbyshire List A cricket records; that is, record team and individual performances in List A cricket for Derbyshire. Records for Derbyshire in first-class cricket, the longer form of the game, are found at List of Derbyshire first-class cricket records.

== Notation ==
Team Notation: When a team score is listed as "300-3", this indicates that they have scored 300 runs for the loss of 3 wickets. If it is followed by a "d", this indicates that the side declared. When the team score is listed as "300", this means the side was all out.

Batting Notation: When a batsman's score is listed as "100", the batsman scored 100 runs and was out. If it followed by an asterisk *, the batsman was not out.

Bowling Notation: "5/100" indicates that the bowler took 5 wickets while conceding 100 runs.

== Team Records ==
	Total Runs	Opponents	Venue	Season
Highest for Derbyshire	366-4	v Combined Universities	Oxford	1991
Highest against Derbyshire	369-6	by (New Zealand) New Zealanders	Derby	1999
Lowest for Derbyshire	61	v Hampshire	Portsmouth	1990
Lowest against Derbyshire	42	by Glamorgan	Swansea	1979
Source: CricketArchive. Last updated: 15 May 2007.

== Batting Records ==
	Runs	Batsman	Opponents	Venue	Season
Highest individual innings	173*	(Australia) Michael Di Venuto	v Derbyshire Cricket Board	Derby	2000
Most runs in a season for Derbyshire	1,151	(Australia) Dean Jones			1996
Most runs in a career for Derbyshire	12,358	(England) Kim Barnett			1979–1998
Source: CricketArchive. Last updated: 15 May 2007.

== Bowling Records ==
	Analysis	Bowler	Opponents	Venue	Season
Best innings analysis for Derbyshire	8/21	(Cricket West Indies) Michael Holding	v Sussex	Hove	1988
	Wickets	Bowler	Season		
Most wickets in a season for Derbyshire	44	(South Africa) Eddie Barlow	1978		
Most career wickets for Derbyshire		unknown			
Source: CricketArchive. Last updated: 15 May 2007.

== Partnership Records ==
Wicket Partnership	Runs	Batsmen	Opponents	Venue	Season
1st	232	(England) Kim Barnett (England) John Morris	v Somerset	Taunton	1990
2nd	286	(England) Iain Anderson (England) Alan Hill	v Cornwall	Derby	1986
3rd	191	(South Africa) Andrew Gait (England) Chris Bassano	v Glamorgan	Cardiff	2003
4th	165	(England) John Morris (England) Geoff Miller	v Gloucestershire	Gloucestershire	1984
5th	158*	(England) Kim Barnett (South Africa) Bruce Roberts	v Essex	Derby	1984
6th	126*	(England) Chris Taylor (South Africa) Ant Botha	v Durham	Derby	2006
7th	106	(South Africa) James Bryant (England) Graeme Welch	v Sussex	Hove	2004
8th	95*	(England) Adrian Rollins (England) Phillip DeFreitas	v Worcestershire	Worcester	1998
9th	105	(Scotland) Dallas Moir (England) Bob Taylor	v Kent	Derby	1984
10th	60	(England) Kevin Dean (England) Devon Malcolm	v Surrey	The Oval	1996
Source: CricketArchive. Last updated: 15 May 2007
