= 1993 Benson & Hedges Cup =

- Administrator(s): Test and County Cricket Board
- Cricket format: Limited overs cricket (55 overs per innings)
- Tournament format(s): Knockout
- Champions: Derbyshire (1st title)
- Participants: 21
- Matches: 20
- Most runs: 247 Neil Fairbrother (Lancashire)
- Most wickets: 10 Wasim Akram (Lancashire)

The 1993 Benson & Hedges Cup was the twenty-second edition of cricket's Benson & Hedges Cup. It was an English limited overs county cricket tournament which was held between 27 April and 10 July 1993. The tournament was won by Derbyshire County Cricket Club who defeated Lancashire County Cricket Club by 6 runs in the final at Lord's.

== Format ==
In the late 1980s the Test and County Cricket Board (TCCB) created a Structure Working Party under the chairmanship of Michael Murray to identify weaknesses in the structure of county cricket and suggest improvements. It reported in 1992. Its main recommendations were the reduction of the County Championship from 22 matches a side to seventeen (each of the eighteen first-class counties playing each other once), all County Championship matches to be played over four days, the Sunday League to be extended from 40 overs a side to 50 overs, and the dropping of the zonal stage of the Benson & Hedges Cup, which would instead be played as a knockout.

These changes were adopted in advance of the 1993 season by a vote of eleven to eight (with one abstention) at a special meeting of the TCCB on 19 May 1992. Although it was agreed that the system should last for a minimum of three years, it was agreed to revert to a zonal system at the TCCB winter meeting on 8–9 December 1993. The changes were implemented in time for the 1995 season.

== Fixtures and results ==
=== Preliminary round ===
27, 28 April 1993
(scorecard)

Minor Counties; 156/8 (55 overs)	v	Durham; 157/4 (53.5 overs)
Ian Cockbain 33; Phil Bainbridge 3/24 (11 overs)		Wayne Larkins 42; Paul Newman 2/23 (10 overs)

Durham won by 6 wickets
Park Drive, Hartlepool
Umpires: Barrie Meyer & Peter Willey
Player of the match: Andrew Fothergill (Durham)

- Reserve day used. No play first day.

27 April 1993
(scorecard)

Gloucestershire; 198/7 (55 overs)	v	Derbyshire; 198/5 (55 overs)
Chris Broad 58; Dominic Cork 2/39 (11 overs)		Peter Bowler 92; Kevin Cooper 1/20 (11 overs)

Derbyshire won by losing fewer wickets
The Royal and Sun Alliance County Ground, Bristol
Umpires: Chris Balderstone & Jack Bond
Player of the match: Peter Bowler (Derbyshire)

27 April 1993
(scorecard)

Combined Universities; 177/7 (55 overs)	v	Hampshire; 178/1 (50 overs)
Jeremy Snape 52; Malcolm Marshall 2/24 (11 overs)		Tony Middleton 91*; Robert Macdonald 1/20 (8 overs)

Hampshire won by 9 wickets
County Ground, Southampton
Umpires: Mervyn Kitchen & George Sharp
Player of the match: Tony Middleton (Hampshire)

27 April 1993
(scorecard)

Glamorgan; 236/7 (55 overs)	v	Kent; 132 all out (49.4 overs)
Matthew Maynard 89; Martin McCague 3/39 (11 overs)		Neil Taylor 42; Steve Barwick 4/15 (9.4 overs)

Glamorgan won by 104 runs
St Lawrence Ground, Canterbury
Umpires: Barry Dudleston & Gerry Stickley
Player of the match: Matthew Maynard (Glamorgan)

27 April 1993
(scorecard)

Scotland; 106/8 (55 overs)	v	Essex; 107/1 (29.3 overs)
Jim Love 44; Mark Ilott 5/21 (11 overs)		John Stephenson 50*; Bruce Russell 1/27 (4.3 overs)

Essex won by 9 wickets
Lochside Park, Forfar
Umpires: John Hampshire & John Holder
Player of the match: Mark Ilott (Essex)

=== First round ===
11 May 1993
(scorecard)

Derbyshire; 253/8 (55 overs)	v	Middlesex; 239/9 (55 overs)
Chris Adams 58; Angus Fraser 3/50 (11 overs)		Desmond Haynes 60; Devon Malcolm 3/62 (11 overs)

Derbyshire won by 14 runs
County Ground, Derby
Umpires: Graham Burgess & David Constant
Player of the match: Chris Adams (Derbyshire)

11 May 1993
(scorecard)

Durham; 196/5 (55 overs)	v	Hampshire; 197/7 (54.1 overs)
Wayne Larkins 110*; Malcolm Marshall 2/29 (11 overs)		Paul Terry 79; Anderson Cummins 3/36 (11 overs)

Hampshire won by 3 wickets
Grangefield Road, Stockton-on-Tees
Umpires: Jack Bond & Vanburn Holder
Player of the match: Wayne Larkins (Durham)

11 May 1993
(scorecard)

Sussex; 263/7 (55 overs)	v	Glamorgan; 230 all out (52.2 overs)
David Smith 55; Adrian Dale 3/37 (11 overs)		Matthew Maynard 57; Franklyn Stephenson 3/48 (10 overs)

Sussex won by 33 runs
Sophia Gardens, Cardiff
Umpires: Bob White & Peter Willey
Player of the match: Ian Salisbury (Sussex)

11 May 1993
(scorecard)

Leicestershire; 206/8 (55 overs)	v	Warwickshire; 206 all out (55 overs)
Phil Robinson 70; Paul Smith 3/33 (7 overs)		Andy Moles 63; Adrian Pierson 3/42 (11 overs)

Leicestershire won by losing fewer wickets
Grace Road, Leicester
Umpires: Ray Julian & Nigel Plews
Player of the match: Phil Robinson (Leicestershire)

11 May 1993
(scorecard)

Nottinghamshire; 279/8 (55 overs)	v	Somerset; 283/9 (55 overs)
Paul Pollard 80; Andy Caddick 2/36 (11 overs)		Nick Folland 83; Greg Mike 4/44 (11 overs)

Somerset won by 1 wicket
Trent Bridge, Nottingham
Umpires: John Holder & Alan Whitehead
Player of the match: Mark Lathwell (Somserset)

11 May 1993
(scorecard)

Lancashire; 236/7 (54.1 overs)	v	Surrey; 230 all out (55 overs)
Neil Fairbrother 87; Martin Bicknell 3/27 (11 overs)		Graham Thorpe 103; Ian Austin 3/40 (11 overs)

Lancashire won by 6 runs
The Foster’s Oval, London
Umpires: Barry Dudleston & George Sharp
Player of the match: Neil Fairbrother (Lancashire)

11 May 1993
(scorecard)

Essex; 115 all out (53.3 overs)	v	Worcestershire; 117/1 (32.1 overs)
Mike Garnham 16*; Richard Illingworth 3/21 (10.3 overs)		Graeme Hick 62*; Derek Pringle 1/21 (7 overs)

Worcestershire won by 9 wickets
New Road, Worcester
Umpires: Chris Balderstone & David Shepherd
Player of the match: Graeme Hick (Worcestershire)

11 May 1993
(scorecard)

Northamptonshire; 211/9 (55 overs)	v	Yorkshire; 177 all out (52.1 overs)
Nigel Felton 62; Mark Robinson 3/51 (11 overs)		Martyn Moxon 52; Richie Richardson52; David Capel 3/54 (10 overs)

Northamptonshire won by 34 runs
Headingley Cricket Ground, Leeds
Umpires: Barrie Meyer & Gerry Stickley
Player of the match: Nigel Felton (Northamptonshire)

=== Quarter-finals ===
25, 26 May 1993
(scorecard)

Hampshire; 223/7 (55 overs)	v	Northamptonshire; 227/3 (53.4 overs)
Paul Terry 76; Curtly Ambrose 2/30 (11 overs)		Nigel Felton 73; Cardigan Connor 1/43 (10.4 overs)

Northamptonshire won by 7 wickets
County Ground, Southampton
Umpires: Mervyn Kitchen & Ken Palmer
Player of the match: Nigel Felton (Northamptonshire)

- Reserve day used. Northamptonshire were 160/3 at the close of the first day's play.

25 May 1993
(scorecard)

Leicestershire; 205/9 (55 overs)	v	Worcestershire; 150 all out (48.2 overs)
Nigel Briers 58; Kenny Benjamin 2/37 (11 overs)		Graeme Hick 82; Vince Wells 4/37 (10 overs)

Leicestershire won by 55 runs
Grace Road, Leicester
Umpires: Barrie Leadbeater & Peter Wight
Player of the match: Winston Benjamin (Leicestershire)

25, 26 May 1993
(scorecard)

Derbyshire; 69/0 (20.3 overs)	v	Somerset
Kim Barnett 35*

No result (Derbyshire won on bowl out 6-3)
County Ground, Taunton
Umpires: John Harris & Don Oslear

- Reserve day used. No play on the second day.

25 May 1993
(scorecard)

Sussex; 178/7 (55 overs)	v	Lancashire; 182/5 (52 overs)
Bill Athey 61; Wasim Akram 2/27 (11 overs)		Wasim Akram 46; Ian Salisbury 2/41 (11 overs)

Lancashire won by 5 wickets
County Ground, Hove
Umpires: Dickie Bird & Alan Whitehead
Player of the match: Wasim Akram (Lancashire)

=== Semi-finals ===
8 June 1993
(scorecard)

Northamptonshire; 210 all out (53.2 overs)	v	Derbyshire; 214/2 (51.3 overs)
Allan Lamb 60; Devon Malcolm 3/23 (10 overs)		Kim Barnett 61; Paul Taylor 1/34 (9.3 overs)

Derbyshire won by 8 wickets
County Ground, Derby
Umpires: Allan Jones & Roy Palmer
Player of the match: John Morris (Derbyshire)

8 June 1993
(scorecard)

Lancashire; 218/6 (55 overs)	v	Leicestershire; 108 all out (40 overs)
Neil Fairbrother 64*; Gordon Parsons 3/21 (11 overs)		James Whitaker 32; Wasim Akram 5/10 (7 overs)

Lancashire won by 110 runs
Grace Road, Leicester
Umpires: John Hampshire & Nigel Plews
Player of the match: Neil Fairbrother (Lancashire)

=== Final ===
10 July 1993
(scorecard)

Derbyshire; 252/6 (55 overs)	v	Lancashire; 246/7 (55 overs)
Dominic Cork 92*; Philip DeFreitas 3/39 (11 overs)		Neil Fairbrother 87*; Alan Warner 3/31 (11 overs)

Derbyshire won by 6 runs
Lord's, London
Umpires: Barrie Meyer & David Shepherd
Player of the match: Dominic Cork (Derbyshire)

== See also ==
- Benson & Hedges Cup
