= 1988 Benson & Hedges Cup =

- Administrator: Test and County Cricket Board
- Cricket format: Limited overs cricket (55 overs per innings)
- Champions: Hampshire (1st title)
- Participants: 20
- Matches: 47
- Most runs: 398 Graham Gooch (Essex)
- Most wickets: 18 Stephen Jefferies (Hampshire)

The 1988 Benson & Hedges Cup was the seventeenth edition of cricket's Benson & Hedges Cup.

The competition was won by Hampshire County Cricket Club.

== Fixtures and results ==
=== Group stage ===
==== Group A ====
Team	Pld	W	L	NR	A	Pts	Rp100
Derbyshire	4	3	0	1	0	7	64.891
Warwickshire	4	2	1	1	0	5	74.015
Leicestershire	4	2	1	0	1	5	60.101
Lancashire	4	1	3	0	0	2	68.258
Scotland	4	0	3	0	1	1	50.101

==== Group B ====
Team	Pld	W	L	NR	A	Pts	Rp100
Worcestershire	4	2	1	0	1	5	68.788
Nottinghamshire	4	2	1	1	0	5	65.366
Northamptonshire	4	2	1	1	0	5	56.465
Yorkshire	4	1	1	2	0	4	63.462
Minor Counties	4	0	3	0	1	1	50.202

==== Group C ====
Team	Pld	W	L	NR	A	Pts	Rp100
Essex	4	3	1	0	0	6	72.154
Middlesex	4	3	1	0	0	6	70.016
Kent	4	2	2	0	0	4	73.536
Sussex	4	1	3	0	0	2	60.909
Surrey	4	1	3	0	0	2	58.900

==== Group D ====
Team	Pld	W	L	NR	A	Pts	Rp100
Glamorgan	4	3	1	0	0	6	63.368
Hampshire	4	3	1	0	0	6	62.613
Gloucestershire	4	3	1	0	0	6	61.020
Somerset	4	1	3	0	0	2	67.476
Combined Universities	4	0	4	0	0	0	51.942

=== Quarter-finals ===
25, 26 May 1988
(scorecard)

Middlesex; 110 all out (46 overs)	v	Derbyshire; 111/1 (30.3 overs)
Keith Brown 32; Devon Malcolm 5/27 (9 overs)		Kim Barnett 69*; Angus Fraser 1/27 (10 overs)

Derbyshire won by 9 wickets
County Ground, Derby
Umpires: Jack Birkenshaw & Ken Palmer
Player of the match: Devon Malcolm (Derbyshire)

- Reserve day used. Derbyshire were 33/0 at the close of the first day's play

25 May 1988
(scorecard)

Warwickshire; 219/7 (55 overs)	v	Essex; 223/1 (47.2 overs)
Andy Lloyd 87; Derek Pringle 3/56 (11 overs)		Graham Gooch 117*; Asif Din 1/26 (4 overs)

Essex won by 9 wickets
County Ground, Chelmsford
Umpires: John Hampshire & Nigel Plews
Player of the match: Graham Gooch (Essex)

25, 26 May 1988
(scorecard)

Nottinghamshire; 220/8 (55 overs)	v	Glamorgan; 221/4 (49.2 overs)
Tim Robinson 60; Greg Thomas 2/34 (11 overs)		Matthew Maynard 108; Kevin Cooper 2/20 (9 overs)

Glamorgan won by 6 wickets
Sophia Gardens, Cardiff
Umpires: David Shepherd & Peter Wight
Player of the match: Matthew Maynard (Glamorgan)

- Reserve day used. No play first day

25, 26, 27 May 1988
(scorecard)

Worcestershire; 169 all out (54.2 overs)	v	Hampshire; 170/7 (53.1 overs)
Martin Weston 50; Stephen Jefferies 4/34 (10.2 overs)		Robin Smith 87*; Neal Radford 3/29 (11 overs)

Hampshire won by 3 wickets
New Road, Worcester
Umpires: Dickie Bird & Barrie Leadbeater
Player of the match: Robin Smith (Hampshire)

- Two reserve days used. No play first day. Worcestershire were 111/5 at the close of the second day's play.

=== Semi-finals ===
8, 9 June 1988
(scorecard)

Essex; 238/6 (55 overs)	v	Hampshire; 239/3 (53.4 overs)
Graham Gooch 41; Nigel Cowley 2/31 (11 overs)		Paul Terry 109; Neil Foster 1/30 (11 overs)

Hampshire won by 7 wickets
County Ground, Chelmsford
Umpires: Barry Dudleston & Alan Whitehead
Player of the match: Paul Terry (Hampshire)

- Reserve day used. Hampshire were 192/1 at the close of the first day's play

8, 9, 10 June 1988
(scorecard)

Derbyshire; 217/8 (55 overs)	v	Glamorgan; 203 all out (54.2 overs)
Bruce Roberts 44; Steve Barwick 3/45 (11 overs)		Alan Butcher 31; Michael Holding 5/31 (10.2 overs)

Derbyshire won by 14 runs
St Helen’s, Swansea
Umpires: Barrie Leadbeater & Barrie Meyer
Player of the match: Michael Holding (Derbyshire)

- Two reserve days used. Glamorgan were 130/5 at the close of the first day's play. No play on the first reserve day.

=== Final ===
9 July 1988
(scorecard)

Derbyshire; 117 all out (46.3 overs)	v	Hampshire; 118/3 (31.5 overs)
John Morris 42; Stephen Jefferies 5/13 (10 overs)		Robin Smith 38; Ole Mortensen 1/19 (5 overs); Alan Warner 1/19 (5.5 overs)

Hampshire won by 7 wickets
Lord's, London
Umpires: David Constant & Nigel Plews
Player of the match: Stephen Jefferies (Hampshire)

== See also ==
Benson & Hedges Cup
