= Bowl-out =

Tiebreaker in limited overs cricket

A bowl-out (sometimes termed a bowl-off) was used as a tiebreaker in various forms of limited overs cricket to decide a match that would otherwise end in a tie. Five bowlers from each side deliver one or two balls each at an unguarded wicket (three stumps). If each team has hit the same number of wickets after the first five bowlers per side, the bowling continues and is decided by sudden death.

The bowl-out is no longer used as a tie breaker in ICC matches or domestic professional leagues, as batting has no effect on the result of the otherwise tied game. It has been replaced by the Super Over.

== History ==
=== First match decided by bowl-out ===
A bowl-out was first used in the NatWest Trophy in June 1991 in a match between Derbyshire and Minor County side Hertfordshire at Bishops Stortford. Derbyshire bowled first and Steve Goldsmith managed one hit from his two deliveries. Ole Mortensen, Alan Warner, Frank Griffith and Simon Base all missed with both of theirs. Hertfordshire's first bowler, Andy Needham, hit with his first ball but missed with his second. John Carr missed with both of his, but Bill Merry struck middle stump with his second attempt to win the match.

A second match was decided by bowl-out later that day as Surrey beat Oxfordshire 3–2.

=== International cricket ===
The International Cricket Council (ICC) introduced the bowl-out should scores be tied in the semifinals and final of the 2006 ICC Champions Trophy or the 2007 Cricket World Cup, although it was not required to be used in either tournament. At the ICC Annual Conference 2008 it was decided that the bowl-out should be replaced by a one-over "eliminator" (also called a "Super Over") in the 2008 ICC Champions Trophy (postponed to 2009) and the 2009 ICC World Twenty20.

== Twenty20 ==
=== International T20 ===
Up until the introduction of the "Super Over" in International Twenty20 cricket, if a match ended with the scores level (either because both teams reached the same score after 20 overs, or the second team scored exactly the par score under the Duckworth-Lewis method), the tie was broken with a bowl-out. The first international bowl-out in a Twenty20 match took place on 16 February 2006, when New Zealand beat West Indies 3-0 in Auckland. A bowl-out was also used on 14 September 2007 when India beat Pakistan 3-0 during the 2007 ICC World Twenty20 in Durban, South Africa.

=== Domestic T20 ===
A bowl-out was first used to decide a domestic Twenty20 match when Surrey beat Warwickshire in July 2005. In the 2009 Twenty20 Cup, Somerset beat Lancashire 5-1 to reach the semi-final stage.

== One-day ==
In some forms of domestic one-day cricket competition, a bowl-out is used to decide the result when the match is tied or rained out: for example, the quarterfinal of the Minor Counties Cricket Association Knockout Trophy in 2004, when Northumberland beat Cambridgeshire 4-2.

== See also ==
- Penalty shootout
