= List of Derbyshire first-class cricket records =

This is a list of Derbyshire first-class cricket records; that is, record team and individual performances in first-class cricket for Derbyshire. Records for Derbyshire in List A cricket, the shorter form of the game, are found at List of Derbyshire List A cricket records.

== Notation ==
Team Notation: When a team score is listed as "300-3", this indicates that they have scored 300 runs for the loss of 3 wickets. If it is followed by a "d", this indicates that the side declared. When the team score is listed as "300", this means the side was all out.

Batting Notation: When a batsman's score is listed as "100", the batsman scored 100 runs and was out. If it followed by an asterisk *, the batsman was not out.

Bowling Notation: "5/100" indicates that the bowler took 5 wickets while conceding 100 runs.

== Team Records ==
	Total Runs	Opponents	Venue	Season
Highest for Derbyshire	801-8 d	v Somerset	Taunton	2007
Highest against Derbyshire	662	by Yorkshire	Chesterfield	1898
Lowest for Derbyshire	16	v Nottinghamshire	Nottingham	1879
Lowest against Derbyshire	23	by Hampshire	Burton upon Trent	1958
Source: CricketArchive. Last updated: 14 May 2007.

== Batting Records ==
	Runs	Batsman	Opponents	Venue	Season
Highest individual innings	274	(England) George Davidson	v Lancashire	Manchester	1896
Most runs in a season for Derbyshire	2,165	(England) Donald Carr			1959
Most runs in a career for Derbyshire	23,854	(England) Kim Barnett			1979 - 1998
Source: CricketArchive. Last updated: 14 May 2007.

== Bowling Records ==
	Analysis	Bowler	Opponents	Venue	Season
Best innings analysis for Derbyshire	10/40	(England) Billy Bestwick	v Glamorgan	Cardiff	1921
Best match analysis for Derbyshire	17/103	(England) William Mycroft	v Hampshire	Southampton	1876
	Wickets	Bowler	Season		
Most wickets in a season for Derbyshire	168	(England) Tommy Mitchell	1935		
Most career wickets for Derbyshire	1,670	(England) Les Jackson	1947 - 1963		
Source: CricketArchive. Last updated: 14 May 2007.

== Partnership Records ==
Wicket Partnership	Runs	Batsmen	Opponents	Venue	Season
1st	360*	(England) Luis Reece (England) Harry Came	v Glamorgan	Derby	2023
2nd	417	(England) Kim Barnett (England) Tim Tweats	v Yorkshire	Derby	1997
3rd	358	(England) Luis Reece (Italy) Wayne Madsen	v Kent	Canterbury	2025
4th	328	(England) Pat Vaulkhard (England) Denis Smith	v Nottinghamshire	Nottingham	1946
5th	302*	(England) John Morris (England) Dominic Cork	v Gloucestershire	Cheltenham	1993
6th	258*	(England) Leus du Plooy (England) Anuj Dal	v Worcestershire	Worcester	2023
7th	258	(England) Mathew Dowman (England) Dominic Cork	v Durham	Derby	2000
8th	198	(England) Karl Krikken (England) Dominic Cork	v Lancashire	Manchester	1996
9th	283	(England) Arnold Warren (England) John Chapman	v Warwickshire	Blackwell	1910
10th	132	(England) Alan Hill (Dominica) Martin Jean-Jacques	v Yorkshire	Sheffield	1986
Source: CricketArchive. Last updated: 14 May 2007
Notes: The ninth wicket partnership between Warren and Chapman is the world record for the ninth wicket.
