= David Millns =

English cricketer (born 1965)

Personal information
- Full name: David James Millns
- Born: 27 February 1965 (age 61); Clipstone, Nottinghamshire
- Height: 6 ft 3 in (1.91 m)
- Batting: Left-handed
- Bowling: Right-arm fast

Domestic team information
- Years: Team
- 1988–1989 2000–2001: Nottinghamshire
- 1990–1999: Leicestershire
- 1994/95: Tasmania
- 1996/97: Boland

Umpiring information
- ODIs umpired: 7 (2020–2023)
- T20Is umpired: 12 (2020–2023)
- WTests umpired: 1 (2014)
- WODIs umpired: 13 (2009–2021)
- WT20Is umpired: 9 (2011–2020)

Career statistics
Competition	First-class	List A
Matches	171	98
Runs scored	3,082	390
Batting average	22.01	15.00
100s/50s	3/8	0/0
Top score	121	39*
Balls bowled	26,571	4,276
Wickets	553	89
Bowling average	27.35	38.10
5 wickets in innings	23	0
10 wickets in match	4	0
Best bowling	9/37	4/26
Catches/stumpings	76/––	19/–
- Source: Cricinfo, 28 July 2022

David James Millns (born 27 February 1965) is a first class cricket umpire and English former professional cricketer who played for Nottinghamshire County Cricket Club, Leicestershire County Cricket Club, Tasmania and Boland. Millns was a fast bowler, and a lower order batsman who was part of two championship winning sides with Leicestershire, in 1996 and 1998.

== Playing career ==
Millns began his first-class career with Nottinghamshire in 1988, but with Franklyn Stephenson and Kevin Cooper each taking 100 wickets for the county, he had limited opportunity that season despite showing promise when he did bowl. Although Millns did show promise with an impressive three-wicket burst against the Sri Lankans, it was noted that he could not offer the penetration and economy of Stephenson and Cooper when he took over from them in limited-overs games against Allan Lamb in June and champions Worcestershire in July.

For 1990, Millns moved to Leicestershire, though he continued to play most of his cricket for local league club Farnsfield. Nevertheless, Millns experienced a purple patch late in the season when called upon by his new county and finished as the top-ranked England-qualified bowler in the national averages, behind only West Indians Ian Bishop and Malcolm Marshall though bowling only half as many balls as those two. In 1991, Millns established himself as Leicestershire's chief bowler alongside Australian John Maguire, and on a green pitch against Derbyshire at Derby took 9/37, which was the best bowling analysis in the County Championship since Derek Underwood took 9/32 for Kent against Surrey in 1978.

Having been told he would be playing for England against Pakistan at the Oval in 1992 he broke a bone in his foot and was not officially selected. Millns toured Australia with the England 'A' side that winter, although he had more success with the ball in one-day matches than in the first-class matches. He was Leicestershire's leading wicket taker (and the sixth nationally) in 1994, taking 76 wickets at 25.01, with many cricket writers believing he should have gone to Australia for the 1994/95 Ashes tour. His best all-round season came in 1996, when he took 73 wickets and scored 424 runs.

Millns is one of only a few cricketers in modern times to score a century and take ten wickets in the same county championship match (v Essex 1996).

== Umpiring career ==
In 2007, he was selected in the reserve list as a first class umpire by the ECB for the season of 2008. In 2008, he was promoted to the first class umpire's list. He stood as an umpire in the 2014–16 ICC Women's Championship. He was selected as one of the two foreign umpires in the 2019–20 Bangladesh Premier League. Since then, he officiates matches regularly in Bangladesh Premier League.

In January 2022, he was named as one of the on-field umpires for the 2022 ICC Under-19 Cricket World Cup in the West Indies.

== See also ==
- List of One Day International cricket umpires
- List of Twenty20 International cricket umpires
