= Chris Marples =

English cricketer and footballer

Personal information
- Full name: Christopher Marples
- Date of birth: 3 August 1964 (age 62)
- Place of birth: Chesterfield, England
- Height: 5 ft 11 in (1.80 m)
- Position: Goalkeeper

Senior career*
Years	Team	Apps	(Gls)
1983–1984	Goole	?	(?)
1984–1987	Chesterfield	84	(0)
1987–1988	Stockport County	57	(0)
1988–1992	York City	138	(0)
1992	Scunthorpe United	1	(0)
1992–1995	Chesterfield	57	(0)

Managerial career
- 2001–2002: Ilkeston Town
- * Club domestic league appearances and goals

Christopher Marples (born 3 August 1964 in Chesterfield, Derbyshire) is an English former footballer and first-class cricketer.

== Football career ==
Marples' Football League goalkeeping career spanned 1984 to 1995, beginning and ending with his local club, Chesterfield and also taking in spells with York City and Stockport County. He won a Fourth Division Championship medal in his first season with Chesterfield and was part of the club's 1994–95 squad that again won promotion from the fourth tier, this time via the playoffs. However, he broke his leg in two places during the course of the campaign.

Though this injury ended his career at the top level, he continued to play non-league football for several years, including with Emley and Ilkeston Town who he went on to manage for the 2001–02 season before a run of poor results led to his dismissal.

In 2005, he became assistant manager to Nicky Law at Buxton during a period which brought success for the club with the achievement of two consecutive promotions in the 2005–06 and 2006–07 seasons to reach the Northern Premier League Premier Division. He accompanied Law in a switch to Alfreton Town for the following season but resigned in April 2008 citing other commitments.

== Cricket career ==
In cricket, Marples was a wicket-keeper and right-handed batsman. Having represented the Derbyshire team in the Second XI Championship as early as 1982, Marples made his debut County Championship appearance in July 1985 against Yorkshire. He finished the game with four catches and played all ten subsequent fixtures in the competition to the end of the season. In addition, Marples was part of Derbyshire's Asda Challenge Trophy winning side.

He played fifteen further First-class cricket matches for the club in 1986, a season during which Derbyshire used three different players in the wicket-keeper role, with Bernie Maher, who was recognised as a stronger batsman, eventually reclaiming the position. Marples was not offered a new contract thereafter.

However, Marples stayed on to play several games with the Second XI in 1987, and returned to play one Second XI game in 1993, an almost actionless three-day match, against Leicestershire.

Throughout the two seasons in which he was a first-team player, Marples was a tail-end batsman alongside Danish mainstay Ole Mortensen and was often unlucky to find himself out of action as a strike partner.

== Honours ==
Chesterfield

- Football League Fourth Division: 1984–85

Individual

- PFA Team of the Year: 1989–90 Fourth Division
