= Christopher Rudd =

English cricketer

Christopher Francis Baines Paul Rudd (born 9 December 1963 in Sutton Coldfield) is an English former cricketer. He was a right-handed batsman and a right-arm off-break bowler. Rudd had played in the Second XI Championship in 1982 and 1984, before starting his first-class county career.

In 1985 and 1986 he played Minor Counties cricket for Devon. He played his first County Championship game in 1986, against Essex, debuting as a lower-order batsman. Rudd was part of the 1987 Derbyshire Second XI team which won the Bain Dawes Trophy in 1987. He also played List A cricket for Devon, and for the Warwickshire Second XI, and in 1994 played for Marylebone Cricket Club.

Rudd was a lower-order batsman, who commonly batted at number nine thanks to the existence of tailender pair Devon Malcolm and Ole Mortensen.
