= Sri Lankan cricket team in England in 1988 =

International cricket tour

The Sri Lanka cricket team toured England in the 1988 season to play a one-match Test series against England. England won the series 1-0.

== Test series summary ==
25 – 30 August 1988
(5–day match)
Scorecard

Sri Lanka	v	England
194 (65.5 overs); JR Ratnayeke 59* (112); NA Foster 3/51 (21 overs)		429 (134.2 overs); RC Russell 94 (202); GF Labrooy 4/119 (40 overs)
331 (109.3 overs); A Ranatunga 78 (179); PJ Newport 4/87 (26.3 overs)		100/3 (34.4 overs); GA Gooch 36 (70); MAR Samarasekera 2/38 (10 overs)

England won by 7 wickets
Lord's, London
Umpires: DJ Constant and JW Holder
Player of the match: PJ Newport (ENG) and JR Ratnayeke (SL)

- England won the toss and elected to field.
- 28 August was taken as a rest day.
- KJ Barnett, DV Lawrence, PJ Newport and RC Russell (all ENG), and MAWR Madurasinghe and MAR Samarasekera (SL) made their Test debuts.

== One Day Internationals (ODIs) ==
England won the Texaco Trophy 1-0.

=== Only ODI ===
4 September 1988
Scorecard

Sri Lanka; 242/7 (55 overs)	v	England; 245/5 (52.4 overs)
LRD Mendis 60 (65); GC Small 3/44 (11 overs)		KJ Barnett 84 (146); GF Labrooy 3/40 (10 overs)

England won by 5 wickets
The Oval, London
Umpires: JW Holder and KE Palmer
Player of the match: KJ Barnett (ENG)

- England won the toss and elected to field.
- KJ Barnett and RA Smith (both ENG) and MAWR Madurasinghe (SL) made their ODI debuts.

== External sources ==
- CricketArchive – tour itineraries

== Annual reviews ==
- Playfair Cricket Annual 1989
- Wisden Cricketers' Almanack 1989
