= Paul Hibbert =

Australian cricketer (1952–2008)

Personal information
- Born: 23 July 1952; Brunswick, Victoria, Australia
- Died: 27 November 2008 (aged 56); Essendon, Victoria, Australia
- Batting: Left-handed
- Bowling: Left-arm medium
- Role: Batsman

International information
- National side: Australia
- Test debut (cap 284): 2 December 1977 v India
- Last Test: 2 December 1977 v India

Domestic team information
- Years: Team
- 1974/75–1986/87: Victoria

Career statistics
Competition	Tests	FC	LA
Matches	1	78	13
Runs scored	15	4,790	225
Batting average	7.50	38.62	17.30
100s/50s	0/0	9/25	0/1
Top score	13	163	56
Balls bowled	–	656	50
Wickets	–	15	1
Bowling average	–	19.00	44.00
5 wickets in innings	–	0	0
10 wickets in match	–	0	0
Best bowling	–	4/28	1/14
Catches/stumpings	1/–	38/–	4/–
- Source: CricketArchive, 28 November 2008

Paul Anthony Hibbert (23 July 1952 – 27 November 2008) was an Australian cricketer who played in one Test in 1977. He was born in Brunswick, Victoria.

Hibbert is one of only two men to make a century in first-class cricket without hitting a boundary, a record he shares with Alan Hill. He was the batting coach at Essendon Cricket Club and the club coach of the Preston Druids Cricket Club.

He died in the Melbourne suburb of Essendon in 2008.

== Career ==
Hibbert was selected for the Victorian squad in 1974–75 after a strong club season in which he had scored 486 runs at an average of 69.

He leapt into test contention at the beginning of the 1977–78 summer when he scored a century against the touring Indian side. Although this was Hibbert's maiden century at first class level there was a lack of in-form openers at the time.

Hibbert was eventually selected in the Australian side for the first test against India, the only specialist opener. He failed twice and was dropped for the second test, being replaced by John Dyson.

Hibbert continued to play for Victoria for many seasons. He had started cricket at Aberfeldie Park CC (formally known as Essendon YCW, Essendon Y.C and Essendon C.Y.M.S) as a junior before playing district cricket at Carlton.

== Personal ==
Hibbert suffered from alcoholism. He was survived by a wife and two children.
