= Zahid Sadiq =

Kenyan cricketer (born 1965)

Personal information
- Full name: Zahid Asa Sadiq
- Born: 6 May 1965 (age 61); Nairobi, Kenya
- Batting: Right-handed
- Relatives: Aftab Habib (cousin)

Domestic team information
- Years: Team
- 1998: Surrey Cricket Board
- 1990: Derbyshire
- 1987–1989: Surrey

Career statistics
Competition	First-class	List A
Matches	8	24
Runs scored	213	251
Batting average	17.75	12.55
100s/50s	–/1	–/1
Top score	64	53
Balls bowled	12	–
Wickets	–	–
Bowling average	–	–
5 wickets in innings	–	–
10 wickets in match	–	–
Best bowling	–	–
Catches/stumpings	5/–	10/–
- Source: CricketArchive (subscription required), 16 October 2011

Zahid Sadiq (born May 6, 1965) was a Kenyan cricketer. He was a right-handed batsman who played for Surrey from 1988 to 1989 and for Derbyshire in 1990.

Sadiq played initially for Surrey. He had to be registered specifically for a single game for Derbyshire in the 1990 season, though he had officially been offered a contract for 1991. He signed for Surrey in 1993 but again, did not have much success with bat or ball.

In 2001, he appeared for Marylebone Cricket Club in a tour of Namibia. Sadiq's cousin, Aftab Habib, is a former England Test cricketer. Sadiq was an upper-middle-order batsman.
