= Bill Fowler (cricketer, born 1959) =

English cricketer

William Peter Fowler (born 13 March 1959) aka Bill "Chook" Fowler, is a retired English cricketer who played first-class cricket in England for Derbyshire in 1983 and 1984.

Fowler's cricketing career started at Worcestershire's Second XI in 1979 before he found himself out of the side at the end of the season, thought ineffective as a middle-order batsman after his final-game duck against Yorkshire.

Fowler moved to New Zealand in the early part of 1980 in order to play for Northern Districts, who he represented until 1982. He moved to Derbyshire in the 1983 season in time for that year's County Championship. A regular fixture in the first team, he played seventeen out of the twenty-four games of the season, and in the 1984 season, was a middle-order fixture as he recorded his career-best score of 116 against Glamorgan.

Alternating between England in the Northern Hemisphere summer and New Zealand in theirs, he did not play another County Championship game after the 1985 season. Fowler played in the Shell Trophy in the last two years of his first-class career.

During his career, Fowler played as a lower-middle order batsman, and maintained a strong one-day bowling average of under 24. He was a right-handed batsman and a left-arm slow bowler. In Auckland he captained the Ellerslie Cricket Club to Championship titles in 1983-1984 and 1985–1986.

== See also ==
- List of Auckland representative cricketers
