= Barry Wood (cricketer) =

English cricketer (born 1942)

Personal information
- Born: 26 December 1942 (age 83); Ossett, Yorkshire, England
- Batting: Right-handed
- Bowling: Right-arm medium

International information
- Test debut: 10 August 1972 v Australia
- Last Test: 1 June 1978 v Pakistan

Domestic team information
- Years: Team
- 1964: Yorkshire
- 1966–1979: Lancashire
- 1980–1983: Derbyshire

Career statistics
Competition	Test	ODI	FC	LA
Matches	12	13	357	291
Runs scored	454	314	17,453	6,041
Batting average	21.61	31.39	33.82	28.36
100s/50s	0/2	0/2	30/81	3/39
Top score	90	78*	198	116
Balls bowled	98	420	21,571	12,584
Wickets	0	9	298	332
Bowling average	–	24.88	30.73	21.30
5 wickets in innings	–	0	8	3
10 wickets in match	–	0	0	0
Best bowling	–	2/14	7/52	5/12
Catches/stumpings	6/–	6/–	284/–	116/–
- Source: CricketArchive, 18 July 2010

Barry Wood (born 26 December 1942) is a former English cricketer and footballer who played for the England cricket team in both Test and ODI competitions. From 1964-1983 he competed in first-class cricket for Yorkshire, Lancashire, and Derbyshire.

== Domestic Competition ==
Born in Ossett, Yorkshire, Wood made his first-class debut for Yorkshire in 1964, but transferred to Lancashire two years later for more playing time. In Lancashire Wood became the first ever Yorkshireman to score two Roses hundreds in the same season, and in the 1970s won a record-breaking number of Man of the Match gold awards. The Lancashire side he was part of won six trophies in six years: the Players County League (1969), the John Player League (1970) and the Gillette Cup four times (1970, 1971, 1972 and 1975).

In 1980 Wood moved to Derbyshire and became captain in 1981. He led the team to victory in the Nat West Trophy final against Northamptonshire - Derbyshire's first ever silverware.

Midway through the 1983 season Wood resigned from the Derbyshire captaincy, and played for Barnoldswick C.C. in the Ribblesdale league for the remainder of the season. Derbyshire's season-end ninth in the Championship effectively ended his first-class cricket career.

Wood returned to County Cricket for a spell with Cheshire (1986-1989), where he notably recorded five consecutive noughts, and won his final Man of the Match gold award, aged 46.

In 1989, an injury to Wasim Akram led to Wood being recalled for Lancashire in their championship match against Warwickshire, where he caught out Andy Moles.

In 1989 and 1990 Wood played as professional for Saddleworth league club Shaw.

Wood's son, Nathan Wood, would go on to play for Lancashire, Cheshire and Young England.

== International Competition ==
Wood's 1970s Lancashire form led to his selection for the final 1972 Ashes Test at The Oval. While Wood batted well for 90, Australia went on to win the match and draw the series. He struggled to replicate this form the following winter during tours of India & Pakistan. He only played 5 more test matches after that 1972-73 tour but never managed to play every match in a series. Wood can, perhaps, be considered unlucky in that his recalls in 1975 and 1976 coincided with the arrival of several great fast bowlers such as Lillee, Thomson, Holding and Roberts.

Wood performed more reliably at ODI level, where his batting average and wicket-taking were both higher. He competed in thirteen matches between 1972 and 1982, including the inaugural 1975 World Cup, and was the first person to be dismissed by the first ball in an ODI match, bowled by Andy Roberts at Scarborough on 26 August 1976. Recalled unexpectedly for a match against India in 1982, four years after his last international and aged 39, Wood scored 78 not out - his highest ODI score - and won the Man of the Match award. This was his last international game.

== Football ==
Wood also played football. He was a midfielder for Ossett Town A.F.C. in the Yorkshire Football League in the mid-1960s and played for Bradford (Park Avenue) A.F.C. in the Northern Premier League in the 1970s as well as for Stalybridge Celtic F.C. for a spell.

== Controversy ==
Wood was involved in a 1975 pay dispute that led to the suspension of Lancashire's international players (Wood, Peter Lever, and Frank Hayes). Lever and Hayes were suspended for three games; Wood for six. Shortly before his departure from Old Trafford in 1979, which included a testimonial, Wood was involved in another pay dispute.

Wood's 1980 move to Derbyshire was obstructed by the TCCB attempting to block his registration. Only a ballot by the P.C.A, with fellow players supporting him 154-31, ended the impasse.

Sporting positions
Preceded by Geoff Miller	Derbyshire cricket captains 1981–1983	Succeeded by Kim Barnett
