= Steve Goldsmith (cricketer) =

English cricketer

Personal information
- Full name: Steven Clive Goldsmith
- Born: 19 December 1964 (age 61); Ashford, Kent
- Batting: Right-handed
- Bowling: Right-arm medium

Domestic team information
- Years: Team
- 1986–1987: Kent
- 1988–1992: Derbyshire
- 1993–2003: Norfolk
- FC debut: 2 September 1987 Kent v Warwickshire
- Last FC: 3 July 1992 Derbyshire v Somerset
- LA debut: 17 August 1986 Kent v Sussex
- Last LA: 28 August 2003 Norfolk v Lincolnshire

Career statistics
Competition	First-class	List A
Matches	75	98
Runs scored	2,646	1,435
Batting average	24.96	20.21
100s/50s	2/12	0/3
Top score	127	67*
Balls bowled	2,898	1,987
Wickets	29	39
Bowling average	54.17	43.12
5 wickets in innings	0	0
10 wickets in match	0	0
Best bowling	3/42	4/64
Catches/stumpings	37/–	34/–
- Source: CricInfo, 12 October 2017

Steven Clive Goldsmith (born 19 December 1964) is an English former professional cricketer who played first-class cricket for Kent and Derbyshire County Cricket Clubs between 1986 and 1992 before moving to play for Norfolk County Cricket Club in 1993. He was born at Ashford, Kent in 1964 and educated at Simon Langton Grammar School for Boys in Canterbury.

== First-class cricket ==
Goldsmith played as a batting all-rounder who bowled right-arm medium-pace deliveries as a "serviceable sixth bowler" in one-day cricket. He first appeared for Kent's Second XI in 1982 and made his senior debut in the 1986 John Player Special League. Aged 22, he made his first-class debut for Kent the following September, after playing what The Times described as "some stunningly confident shots" in a one-day match during August. The paper went on to say that "a great deal more will be heard of him", but he was released by the county at the end of the season after only five senior appearances.

A move to Derbyshire for the start of the 1988 season saw Goldsmith play more regularly and he scored 1,071 runs in his first season with the county. He was a regular member of the team, particularly in one-day cricket and was part of the team which reached the final of the 1988 Benson & Hedges Cup, taking "a wonderful catch" on the boundary in the match. Injuries during 1989 and 1990 restricted his appearances, although he was a member of the Derbyshire team which won the 1990 Sunday League, hitting the winning runs in the match which clinched the trophy. The following season, Goldsmith was the only Derbyshire bowler to hit the stumps in the teams loss to Hertfordshire in a bowl-out in the 1991 NatWest Trophy.

== Move to Norfolk ==
Goldsmith made two centuries in his 75 first-class matches, but suffered an injury in 1992, a cut which effectively ended his top-level career. He heard the news of his release by Derbyshire on local radio before having been informed by the county, which later apologised publicly. He moved to play for Norfolk, playing in 90 Minor Counties Championship matches for the county between 1993 and 2003, as well as appearing in the Minor Counties Trophy and 15 List A matches. He took a five-wicket haul in the 1997 Minor Counties Trophy final as Norfolk beat Shropshire at Lord's. and scored ten Minor Counties Championship centuries for the team, including a score of 200 not out in 1993, an innings in which he batted with Roger Finney to set a new record third-wicket partnership of 290 runs.

Consistently one of Norfolk's leading run scorers throughout his time in the team, Goldsmith scored 6,063 Minor Counties Championship runs and took 181 wickets. As well as his ten centuries, he made 39 half-centuries in his 11 seasons, and scored 157 in a Norfolk record fourth-wicket partnership of 195 with Carl Rogers in 1997. At the time he retired he was the ninth leading Championship run scorer in Norfolk history and one of only eight men to have scored a double century for the team, whilst his 917 Championship runs in 1993 are the fourth highest for the county. He played six times for the Minor Counties representative team in the Benson & Hedges Cup in 1995 and 1998.

Goldsmith set up a cricket coaching company in Norfolk and continues to coach in the county, being involved with the Norfolk county team as well as with a variety of other local teams. England international cricketer Olly Stone, who was a Norfolk age-group player, credits Goldsmith with identifying his talent and encouraging him to pursue the sport at a higher level. Goldsmith played for and coached at Vauxhall Mallards in Brundall and was a games coach at Taverham Hall School near Norwich.
