= Lindsay Wood =

English cricketer

Personal information
- Full name: Lindsay Jonathan Wood
- Born: 12 May 1961 (age 65); Ruislip, Middlesex
- Batting: Left-handed
- Bowling: Slow left-arm orthodox
- Role: Bowler

Domestic team information
- Years: Team
- 1981–1982: Kent
- 1986: Derbyshire
- FC debut: 12 August 1981 Kent v Essex
- Last FC: 23 August 1986 Derbyshire v Notts

Career statistics
Competition	First-class
Matches	4
Runs scored	12
Batting average	3.00
100s/50s	0/0
Top score	5
Balls bowled	564
Wickets	6
Bowling average	46.16
5 wickets in innings	0
10 wickets in match	0
Best bowling	4/124
Catches/stumpings	0/–
- Source: CricInfo, 16 October 2023

Lindsay Jonathan Wood (born 12 May 1961) is an English former professional cricketer. He played as a left-arm spin bowler for Kent and Derbyshire County Cricket Clubs during the 1980s.

Wood was born at Ruislip in Middlesex in 1961 and was educated at Simon Langton Grammar School for Boys at Canterbury in Kent before attending King Alfred's College in Winchester. He made his Kent Second XI debut in 1979 and played for the team regularly before making his First XI debut in an August 1981 County Championship match against Essex at Chelmsford in the absence of Kent's established left-arm spin bowler Derek Underwood. He took four wickets on debut, but did not play again for the First XI until the following season when he went wicketless against the touring Indians at Canterbury.

Although he continued to play for the Second XI until 1985, Wood's opportunities in the Kent First XI were limited both by a series of injuries and by the presence of Underwood, one of Kent's leading bowlers and a fixture in the First XI between 1963 and 1987. He played club cricket for the St Lawrence and Highland Park team and appeared regularly for the Second XI, winning his Second XI cap in 1982. Ahead of the 1986 season he moved to play for Derbyshire, making two further first-class appearances for the team during the season, taking two wickets against Essex in June. He again played regularly for the county Second XI during the season but was released and did not play any further county cricket.
