= 1988 English cricket season =

The 1988 English cricket season was the 89th in which the County Championship had been an official competition. It was dominated by Worcestershire who won the first of two successive championships and also a second successive Sunday League title. Cricket made the front pages of national newspapers, due to the "Summer of four captains" phenomenon that afflicted the England national team, during its five match Test series against West Indies which they lost 4–0. Sri Lanka also toured and played a single Test which England won.

== Honours ==
- County Championship - Worcestershire
- NatWest Trophy - Middlesex
- Sunday League - Worcestershire
- Benson & Hedges Cup - Hampshire
- Minor Counties Championship - Cheshire
- MCCA Knockout Trophy - Dorset
- Second XI Championship - Surrey II
- Wisden - Kim Barnett, Jeff Dujon, Phil Neale, Franklyn Stephenson, Steve Waugh

== Annual reviews ==
- Playfair Cricket Annual 1989
- Wisden Cricketers' Almanack 1989
