= 1984 English cricket season =

The 1984 English cricket season was the 85th in which the County Championship had been an official competition. West Indies and Sri Lanka toured England. On the domestic front the County Championship was retained by Essex who also won the Sunday League.

== Honours ==
- County Championship - Essex
- NatWest Trophy - Middlesex
- Sunday League - Essex
- Benson & Hedges Cup - Lancashire
- Minor Counties Championship - Durham
- MCCA Knockout Trophy - Hertfordshire
- Second XI Championship - Yorkshire II
- Wisden - Martin Crowe, Larry Gomes, Geoff Humpage, Jack Simmons, Sidath Wettimuny

== External sources ==
- Britannic Assurance County Championship 1984 at CricketArchive
- Benson and Hedges Cup 1984 at CricketArchive
- John Player Special League 1984 at CricketArchive
- Minor Counties Championship 1984 at CricketArchive

== Annual reviews ==
- Playfair Cricket Annual 1985
- Wisden Cricketers' Almanack 1985
