= Martin Jean-Jacques =

Dominican cricketer

Personal information
- Full name: Martin Jean-Jacques
- Born: 2 July 1960 (age 66); Soufrière, Dominica
- Batting: Right-handed
- Bowling: Right-arm medium-fast

Domestic team information
- Years: Team
- 1983–1988: Buckinghamshire
- 1986–1992: Derbyshire
- 1993–1994: Hampshire

Career statistics
Competition	First-class	List A
Matches	60	51
Runs scored	681	140
Batting average	11.94	7.36
100s/50s	–/1	–/–
Top score	73	23
Balls bowled	7,550	2,064
Wickets	124	53
Bowling average	36.40	34.35
5 wickets in innings	2	–
10 wickets in match	1	–
Best bowling	8/77	3/22
Catches/stumpings	15/–	8/–
- Source: Cricinfo, 20 August 2023

Martin Jean-Jacques (born 2 July 1960) is a Dominican-born English cricketer. During his eight years in first-class cricket, he played for Derbyshire and Hampshire.

== Cricket career ==
Jean-Jacques was born in Dominica at Soufrière in July 1960, but immigrated to England as a child, where he attended Aylestone High School. He first played county cricket for Buckinghamshire at minor counties level, debuting against Berkshire at Amersham in the 1983 Minor Counties Championship. It was for Buckinghamshire that he made his debut in List A one-day cricket, against Lancashire in the 1984 NatWest Trophy, followed by a second appearance against Somerset in the 1985 NatWest Trophy. Following good performances at minor counties level, Jean-Jacques was signed by Derbyshire. On his first-class debut against Yorkshire at Sheffield in the 1986 County Championship, he batted at number eleven and made 73, sharing in a Derbyshire record-partnership for the tenth-wicket of 132 with Alan Hill, a record which remains as of 2026. He also took his maiden first-class wicket in this match, that of Geoff Boycott. Three matches later against Kent, he took his career best innings bowling figures of 8 for 77 and took match figures of 10 for 125. Jean-Jacques played first-class cricket for Derbyshire until 1992, making 53 appearances, in addition to making forty one-day appearances. He typically found his opportunities at Derbyshire limited by the presence of other fast bowlers in the Derbyshire side, such as Michael Holding, Ole Mortensen, and Devon Malcolm. His longest run in the side came in 1990, when bowlers across England struggled to take wickets. In first-class cricket for Derbyshire, he took 115 wickets at an average of 35.57; he took five wickets in an innings on two occasions. With the bat, he scored 587 runs at a batting average of 11.28. In one-day cricket for Derbyshire, he took 43 wickets at an average of 33.86, with best figures of 3 for 22.

With his contract at Derbyshire ending in 1992, several counties showed an interest in signing him. Hampshire were one such county. They found themselves short of fast bowling options as Malcolm Marshall came toward the end of his career. With only the experienced Cardigan Connor to otherwise lead the attack, Hampshire signed Jean-Jacques. He played first-class and one-day cricket for Hampshire until 1994, making seven first-class and nine one-day appearances. In these, he took nine first-class wickets at an average of exactly 47 and nine one-day wickets at an average of 34.11. During his two-year contract, Jean-Jacques struggled with his rhythm and pace, with his contract not being renewed by Hampshire upon its expiration. Ultimately, a knee injury forced his permanent retirement from the county game. He continued to play club cricket for Shepherd's Bush into the late 1990s.
