= Andrew Brown (cricketer, born 1964) =

English cricketer

Personal information
- Born: 6 November 1964 (age 62)
- Batting: Left-handed
- Bowling: Right-arm off-break
- Role: Batsman

Domestic team information
- Years: Team
- 1985–1992: Derbyshire
- 2001–2003: Suffolk

Andrew Brown (born 6 November 1964) is an English former cricketer. He was a left-handed batsman and a right-arm off-break bowler who played first-class cricket for Derbyshire between 1985 and 1992.

== Career ==
Brown made his debut Second XI Championship appearance in the 1982 season, playing for the team for three whole years before making a first County Championship appearance for his team in Derbyshire's lean 1985 season. In his second game at first class level he scored 74 against Warwickshire at Chesterfield. The next year, he played against a group of touring New Zealanders. In 1987 Brown was released but before his departure helped Derbyshire secure the 2nd XI one day cup top scoring in the final against Hampshire at Southampton.

Brown continued to score runs and forced his way back in to County cricket at the back end of the 1989 season, he hit a 65 in his first Championship match for three years and, when Derbyshire were going through their best batting spell for many years, in 1990, he hit his maiden first-class century against Northamptonshire, though he was to finish the match with a broken hand, administered by Curtly Ambrose. During the 1990 season Brown sustained a broken thumb after a promising start to the season and then the shattered knuckle during his 139 and averaged over 40 that season. The following season Derbyshire signed Mohammad Azharuddin and this spelled the end of Browns opportunities in 1991. Though he was released for the second time in 1992. In 1997 Brown returned to Derbyshire as Second XI captain coach after impressing with his coaching abilities around the World in New Zealand and South Africa. He left the post to take up the role as Suffolk Head Coach which also included him playing for the county.

During his tenure as Coach Suffolk had their best period of success winning the Eastern Division and culminating at Lord's in late 2007 with the winning of the One Day Cup.

After these successes Brown once again returned to Derbyshire in 2008 as Head Coach alongside former teammate John Morris whom had taken on the role as Director of Cricket.

Brown scored more runs for Derbyshire's second XI than any other batsman in history, a record which still stands today.

Andy Brown currently coaches Ockbrook and Borrowash CC in Derbyshire
