= Tim O'Gorman =

English cricketer (born 1967)

Timothy Joseph Gerard O'Gorman (born 15 May 1967) is a former professional cricketer who played first-class cricket for Derbyshire from 1987 to 1996.

O'Gorman was born at Woking, Surrey, into a cricketing family. He was educated at St George's College, Weybridge and St Chad's College, Durham University, where he studied law; he later became a solicitor.

A right-hand batsman, O'Gorman played 197 innings in 117 first-class matches, scoring 5372 runs at an average of 31.05 and a top score of 148. He was an occasional right-arm off-break bowler who took three first-class wickets at a cost of 215 runs. His grandfather, Joe O'Gorman, also played first-class cricket.

Since retiring from the professional game, O'Gorman has been chairman of the Professional Cricketers' Association, and served as a member of the General and Cricket committees of the MCC and Chairman of the MCC Young Cricketers. He is Company Secretary of The Carphone Warehouse.
