= Chris Adams (cricketer) =

English cricketer

Personal information
- Full name: Christopher John Adams
- Born: 6 May 1970 (age 56); Whitwell, Derbyshire, England
- Nickname: Grizzly, Grizwold
- Height: 6 ft 0 in (1.83 m)
- Batting: Right-handed
- Bowling: Right-arm offbreak
- Role: Middle-order batsman
- Relatives: Georgia Adams (daughter)

International information
- National side: England
- Test debut (cap 598): 25 November 1999 v South Africa
- Last Test: 18 January 2000 v South Africa
- ODI debut (cap 149): 21 May 1998 v South Africa
- Last ODI: 28 January 2000 v Zimbabwe

Domestic team information
- Years: Team
- 1988–1997: Derbyshire
- 1998–2008: Sussex (squad no. 1)
- 1998/99: Australian Capital Territory

Head coaching information
- Years: Team
- 2008–2013: Surrey

Career statistics
Competition	Test	ODI	FC	LA
Matches	5	5	336	367
Runs scored	104	71	19,535	11,481
Batting average	13.00	17.75	38.68	39.72
100s/50s	0/0	0/0	48/93	21/69
Top score	31	42	239	163
Balls bowled	120	–	3,288	1,217
Wickets	1	–	41	32
Bowling average	59.00	–	47.19	38.03
5 wickets in innings	0	–	0	1
10 wickets in match	0	–	0	0
Best bowling	1/42	–	4/28	5/16
Catches/stumpings	6/–	3/–	404/–	165/–
- Source: Cricinfo, 27 July 2009

Christopher John Adams (born 6 May 1970) is an English former first-class cricketer who briefly represented his nation at Test and One Day International level. He was also head coach of Surrey from 2008 until 2013.

== Playing career ==
An aggressive right-handed batsman, occasional right-arm off spin bowler and specialist slip fielder, Adams enjoyed a successful first-class career for Derbyshire and Sussex.

Adams made his first-class debut as an eighteen-year-old for Derbyshire in one match the 1988 season and stayed there until the 1997 season, when he left to join Sussex as captain. He is the longest serving county captain in Sussex's history. He captained Sussex to the 2003, 2006 and 2007 County Championship titles, and was one of five Wisden Cricketers of the Year in 2004 for his efforts in the previous calendar year.

He had a brief career at international level for England, playing five Tests and five One-day Internationals between May 1998 and January 2000. He made his Test debut in 1999 against South Africa at Johannesburg, and came to the crease for his maiden Test innings to face Allan Donald on a hat-trick, with England in the perilous position of four wickets down for two runs; he successfully negotiated the hat-trick, but was caught behind off Donald in both innings, for 16 and 1. Failing to reproduce his domestic form, Adams averaged just 13 in Tests and 17.75 in ODIs.

In a first-class career that ran from 1988 until 2008, Adams scored 19,535 runs, with an impressive 48 centuries and a highest score of 239.

In late 2006, he agreed a four-year deal with Yorkshire to become both captain and director of professional cricket, but dramatically reversed this decision on 14 November, saying that he did not feel able to deal with such a role at this stage of his career. His change of heart left Yorkshire "shell-shocked" but Sussex "thrilled".

Adams announced he was to step down as Sussex captain on 14 September 2008, guiding Sussex to the Pro40 Division One Title the same day. He subsequently announced his retirement from first-class cricket, upon his appointment as cricket manager of Surrey County Cricket Club.

== Coaching career ==
After taking over at Surrey in 2008 and appointing a young captain in Rory Hamilton-Brown Surrey gained promotion and won the domestic 40 over competition in 2011. He was coach when the Surrey team suffered the death of one of their young first team players Tom Maynard on 18 June 2012, on a tube line after fleeing from police who stopped his car with him four times over the alcohol limit with cocaine and MDMA in his system. Even though Maynard's housemate and captain Hamilton-Brown, who had been out with Maynard that fateful evening, left to join Sussex, questions remained about the disciplinary attitudes at the club. On 17 June 2013, it was announced by Surrey County Cricket Club that Adams had been sacked, along with his first team coach Ian Salisbury.

== Personal life ==
Adams' daughters Georgia and Mollie are both cricketers who have played for Sussex Women.

Sporting positions
Preceded by Peter Moores	Sussex county cricket captain 1998–2008	Succeeded by Michael Yardy
