= Iain Anderson (cricketer) =

English cricketer (born 1960)

Personal information
- Full name: Iain Stuart Anderson
- Born: 24 April 1960 (age 66); Derby, England
- Batting: Right-handed
- Bowling: Right-arm off-break

Domestic team information
- Years: Team
- 1978–1987: Derbyshire
- 1983–1984: Boland

Career statistics
Competition	FC	LA
Matches	140	81
Runs scored	4726	1594
Batting average	23.86	24.90
100s/50s	2/26	1/5
Top score	112	134
Balls bowled	2265	97
Wickets	22	4
Bowling average	61.63	14.75
5 wickets in innings	0	0
10 wickets in match	0	0
Best bowling	4/35	2/15
Catches/stumpings	106/0	25/0
- Source: CricketArchive (subscription required), 27 April 2019

Iain Stuart Anderson (born 24 April 1960) is a former English cricketer who played for Derbyshire from 1978 to 1987 and for Boland, South Africa, in 1983/84.

A Derby native, Anderson accrued three Youth Test match appearances between 1978 and 1979, as an opening batsman, and one Youth ODI appearance, against Australia in the winter of 1979.

Anderson's first-class cricketing career started for Derbyshire in the 1978 season, finishing not-out in his first innings of a drawn match against Northamptonshire and taking one wicket in Northamptonshire's innings. He played consistently through to the beginning of the 1980s, and in the 1981 season featured in a match against the touring Australians, taking four wickets in a drawn game in June 1981.

Anderson played well into the 1983 season before moving in the autumn of 1983 to South Africa to play for Boland to play in the Castle Bowl. He found himself back in England at the end of the Castle Bowl tournament, playing in the 1984 County Championship, where he continued for the next three years.

Anderson was a right-handed batsman and played 225 innings in 140 first-class matches with an average of 23.86 and a top score of 112. He played as an opening batsman throughout his career, both in international and domestic cricket in both England and South Africa. He was a right-arm off-break bowler and took 22 first-class wickets at an average of 61.63 and a best performance of 4–35.

Anderson retired at the end of the 1987 season, having served the Derbyshire team for eight years.
