= Peter Bowler (cricketer) =

Anglo-Australian cricketer

Personal information
- Full name: Peter Duncan Bowler
- Born: 30 July 1963 (age 63); Plymouth, Devon, England
- Batting: Right-handed
- Bowling: Right-arm offbreak
- Role: Occasional wicket keeper

Domestic team information
- Years: Team
- 1995–2004: Somerset
- 1988–1994: Derbyshire
- 1986/87: Tasmania
- 1986–1987: Leicestershire
- First-class debut: 2 July 1986 Leicestershire v Hampshire
- Last First-class: 10 September 2004 Somerset v Yorkshire

Career statistics
| Competition | FC | List A |
|---|---|---|
| Matches | 318 | 322 |
| Runs scored | 19567 | 9362 |
| Batting average | 40.51 | 31.95 |
| 100s/50s | 45/101 | 7/72 |
| Top score | 241* | 138* |
| Balls bowled | 3302 | 653 |
| Wickets | 34 | 13 |
| Bowling average | 60.32 | 40.84 |
| 5 wickets in innings | 0 | 0 |
| 10 wickets in match | 0 | n/a |
| Best bowling | 3/25 | 3/31 |
| Catches/stumpings | 232/1 | 119/2 |
- Source: Cricinfo, 17 August 2009

Peter Duncan Bowler (born 30 July 1963) is a former English-born Australian cricketer who played for Leicestershire in 1986, Tasmania in 1986/87, Derbyshire from 1988 to 1994 and for Somerset from 1995 to 2004.

== Playing career ==
Bowler played three youth Test matches during a 1982 tour of Pakistan; he made 82 on his debut, also making a 76 on the tour.

In 1986, Bowler made a century on his Leicestershire debut. Though he played in Australia during the following season, he came back to England in 1988, playing for Derbyshire and, fourteen times in the ensuing seventeen seasons, top-scored in the season with an innings exceeding 100. In 1988, his first season with Derbyshire, he scored 1725 runs, a record which stood for three years until broken by Mohammad Azharuddin.

Bowler's top score in first-class cricket was 241 not out. Even in 1992, when he possessed his highest season average, of nearly 66 runs, he failed to get a call-up by the England selectors, particularly at a time when Derbyshire's wickets were more suspect to being felled by clever seam bowlers.

However, come 1994, he had a very poor season, playing for Somerset, soon following this up with a 1997 and 1998 season where his problems were only exacerbated. He made something of a comeback in Derbyshire's second placing of 2001, before they were relegated the following season. He spent two years in Division Two before retiring from the game. He was a right-handed batsman and a right-arm off-break bowler, who also occasionally played as a wicket-keeper.

== Early life ==
Bowler attended Daramalan College in Canberra as a child. He started playing cricket at school when he was nine years old.

Sporting positions
| Preceded by Andy Hayhurst | Somerset County Cricket Captain; 1997–1998 | Succeeded by Jamie Cox |
