= Ole Mortensen =

Danish cricketer

Personal information
- Full name: Ole Henrik Mortensen
- Born: 29 January 1958 (age 68); Vejle, Denmark
- Nickname: Stan, Bloodaxe
- Height: 6 ft 4 in (1.93 m)
- Batting: Right-handed
- Bowling: Right-arm fast-medium
- Role: Bowler

International information
- National side: Denmark (1979–1994)

Domestic team information
- Years: Team
- 1983–1994: Derbyshire

Career statistics
Competition	FC	LA	ICC T
Matches	157	200	26
Runs scored	709	145	329
Batting average	8.97	5.57	25.30
100s/50s	0/1	0/0	0/2
Top score	74*	11	59*
Balls bowled	23,883	9,918	1606
Wickets	434	219	63
Bowling average	23.88	25.56	10.41
5 wickets in innings	16	2	1
10 wickets in match	1	0	0
Best bowling	6/27	6/14	7/19
Catches/stumpings	47/–	26/–	5/–
- Source: CricketArchive, 22 July 2009

Ole Henrik Mortensen (born 29 January 1958) is a Danish first-class cricketer, probably the best his country has produced. A fast-medium right-arm bowler, he took 434 wickets at an average of 23.88, in a first-class career with Derbyshire that ran from 1983 to 1994.

== Playing career ==
Mortensen was 25 when he went to England to play cricket in 1983. He immediately established himself in the Derbyshire side and took 66 wickets at 24.31. Wisden that year described him as "accurate, hostile and, above all, a bowler of unquenchable spirit". It was his most successful season, and also included his best innings and match figures, when in his seventh first-class match he took 6 for 27 and 5 for 62 to help Derbyshire beat Yorkshire by 22 runs at Sheffield. In 1988, injury restricted him to 12 matches, but he topped the national first-class bowling averages with 34 wickets at 13.64. He was especially economical in one-day cricket, and in 1990, when Derbyshire won the Refuge Assurance League 40-over competition, he was the most economical bowler in the whole competition. In 1985 his first contract with Derbyshire expired. Carlsberg the Danish brewers attempted to sign him on behalf of Northamptonshire (where they had their UK base) and offered to double their countryman's wage. "Stan", as his team-mates knew him, decided to stay at Derby because he "felt that we were going places under Kim Barnett's leadership and sincerely believed we were going to win some trophies". His judgement was partially vindicated in 1993 when he helped the side win the Benson & Hedges Cup.

He was a genuine tail-ender. The only time he exceeded 40 he made 74 not out against Yorkshire at Chesterfield in 1987, putting on 151 for the ninth wicket with Reg Sharma (who made his only first-class century).

For Denmark, Mortensen appeared in four ICC Trophy tournaments (1979, 1986, 1990 and 1994), claiming 63 wickets at a mere 10.41 apiece, including a return of 7–19 in a one-sided match against Israel (who were bowled out for 45) in Nairobi in 1994. In 1989 he took an impressive 3-15 for Denmark in a limited-over match against a strong touring Australian side, his wickets including Mark Taylor, who had both just dominated England bowlers in a Test match series.

Mortensen earned the nickname "Stan" while playing for Derbyshire, a reference to the famous England football player of the 1940s and 1950s, Stan Mortensen. He earned another nickname "Eric Bloodaxe" for his ability to swear in Danish. This cricketing Viking was caricatured in 1994 by Pete Sellman.

Mortensen played for Ellerslie Cricket Club in Auckland, New Zealand in the 1983/84 New Zealand season, helping Ellerslie win a club one day tournament at Eden Park. From the 1984/85 English off-season Mortensen played for Brighton Cricket Club in Melbourne, Australia, taking 401 wickets at 13.00.

He represented Victoria against South Australia in a Christmas game and won the "R. M. Hatch Trophy" twice in 1986-87 and again in 1992–93. This trophy is awarded to the outstanding player in Sub-District cricket.

== Coaching career ==
Danish national coach in cricket 1995–2000. German national coach 2002–2005. Norwegian national coach 2006–2010.

Coaching Copenhagen Cricket Club (KB), Glostrup Cricket Club (Danish championship 2008 and 2011).

== Life after cricket ==
Mortensen is a teacher in Denmark, specifically in Gladsaxe Skole
