= Simon Base =

English cricketer (born 1960)

Simon Base (born 1960) is a retired English cricketer. He was a right-handed batsman and a right-arm medium-fast bowler who played first-class cricket between 1981 and 1999.

Base was born in Maidstone, Kent, but first represented Western Province South Africa in 1981 before moving back to England to commence his county career; He initially played for Glamorgan in 1986 and later Derbyshire. He also played for Boland and Border Provinces in South Africa.

Base took 388 first-class wickets and 221 List A wickets, and was part of the Derbyshire side which won the Refuge Assurance League in 1990.

In 1989, he toured the Netherlands with the England A team, taking three wickets in two limited-over matches against a Netherlands XI.
