= Reg Sharma =

Kenyan cricketer (born 1962)

Personal information
- Full name: Rajeshwar Sharma
- Born: 27 June 1962 (age 64); Nairobi, Kenya
- Batting: Right-handed
- Bowling: Right-arm off break Right-arm medium
- Role: Occasional wicket-keeper

Domestic team information
- Years: Team
- 1985–1989: Derbyshire

Career statistics
Competition	First-class	List A
Matches	70	56
Runs scored	2,196	520
Batting average	24.25	13.33
100s/50s	1/9	–/1
Top score	111	50
Balls bowled	4,542	1,074
Wickets	53	27
Bowling average	41.26	29.03
5 wickets in innings	2	–
10 wickets in match	–	–
Best bowling	6/80	4/29
Catches/stumpings	61/–	25/–
- Source: CricketArchive, 16 October 2011

Rajeshwar (Reg) Sharma (born 27 June 1962) is a former Kenyan cricketer who played first-class cricket for Derbyshire between 1985 and 1989.

Sharma first played for the second XI of Kent, until 1983. He was drafted in as an emergency measure for a game with Gloucestershire later in the same year, when they were short of an opening strike partner for eventual centurion John Skinner, but played only one game for the team.

Sharma's first-class career, which lasted four years, started with a debut for Derbyshire at Nottinghamshire in 1985. Sharma maintained a strong middle-order position in the batting lineup for the next four years, hitting a first-class best, and his only century innings, of 111 in 1987.

Sharma continued in first-class cricket until 1989. He was a right-handed batsman, right-arm offbreak bowler and wicket-keeper.
