= Frank Griffith (cricketer) =

English cricketer

Frank Alexander Griffith (born 15 August 1968) is an English cricketer. He was a right-handed batsman and a right-arm medium-pace bowler who played for Derbyshire between 1988 and 1996.

Having made his Second XI debut during the 1987 season, he played his debut first-class match during the following season. After Derbyshire had named a squad which did not feature Griffith's name, he was suddenly to find himself called up after many of the players, aggravated at the poor weather, drove away from the August 1988 game.

Two weeks after this memorable first appearance, his Derbyshire team played host to the touring Sri Lankans in a drawn three-dayer. Later, he was also to find himself playing for Derbyshire against selected teams of West Indians, Pakistanis, Australians, and South Africans.

Such as was the case with several of the Peakites' all-rounders of the early nineties, he barely found comfort in being able to claim better batting or bowling skill either way. Following Griffith's exit in 1996, it had been rumoured that Glamorgan had shown an interest in his name, and a season later, the Welsh county were to win the County Championship.

In his First-Class career Griffith took 73 wickets at an average of 35.21 and scored 1087 runs at an average of 20.12. (ESPN - 13475) He was a member of the Derbyshire team that won the Benson & Hedges Cup in 1993, bowling a full quota of 11 overs and taking 2 for 60.

At the end of Griffith's career, he played Minor Counties cricket for Cambridgeshire. Griffith was a middle-lower order batsman. He is currently cricket coach and games master at Chigwell School, Essex.

Frank Griffith also had a most important spell as an opening bowler for the Middlesex premier division team of Winchmore Hill Cricket Club He opened the bowling with various players including Surry's Carlos Remi and captain Neal Avent, who holds the club's record for 1st 11 premier league games. Griffith currently holds the best lifetime bowling average for the club.

His daughter, Cordelia Griffith, currently plays cricket for Essex and Sunrisers.
