= Kevin Cooper (cricketer) =

English cricketer

Personal information
- Born: 27 December 1957 (age 68); Sutton-in-Ashfield
- Batting: Left-handed
- Bowling: Right-arm fast-medium

Career statistics
Competition	First-class	List A
Matches	305	283
Runs scored	2,484	479
Batting average	10.05	7.98
100s/50s	0/1	0/0
Top score	52	31
Balls bowled	49,504	14,039
Wickets	817	271
Bowling average	26.94	33.00
5 wickets in innings	26	0
10 wickets in match	1	0
Best bowling	8/44	4/9
Catches/stumpings	93/–	53/–
- Source: Cricinfo, 10 October 2022

Kevin Edwin Cooper (born 27 December 1957) is a former English cricketer who played for Nottinghamshire, Gloucestershire and Herefordshire.
