= 1990 English cricket season =

The 1990 English cricket season was the 91st in which the County Championship had been an official competition. The size of the seam on the cricket ball had been reduced markedly from 1989, and along with dry conditions and the extension of four-day cricket this enabled batsmen to make large scores and Graham Gooch became one of a handful of players to average over 100 in a first-class season. The County Championship was won by Middlesex. England defeated both New Zealand and India 1–0 in respective Test series.

== Honours ==
- County Championship – Middlesex CCC
- NatWest Trophy – Lancashire CCC
- Sunday League – Derbyshire CCC
- Benson & Hedges Cup – Lancashire CCC
- Minor Counties Championship – Hertfordshire
- MCCA Knockout Trophy – Buckinghamshire
- Second XI Championship – Sussex II
- Wisden – Mike Atherton, Mohammed Azharuddin, Alan Butcher, Desmond Haynes, Mark Waugh

== Other tours ==
=== Zimbabwe tour ===
The Zimbabwe national cricket team made a short tour of England in May, playing two limited overs and three first-class matches against county opposition.

== Annual reviews ==
- Playfair Cricket Annual 1991
- Wisden Cricketers' Almanack 1991
