= Geoff Miller =

English cricketer

Personal information
- Full name: Geoffrey Miller
- Born: 8 September 1952 (age 74); Chesterfield, Derbyshire, England
- Nickname: Dusty
- Batting: Right-handed
- Bowling: Right-arm offbreak
- Role: Bowling All-Rounder

International information
- National side: England
- Test debut (cap 469): 12 August 1976 v West Indies
- Last Test: 28 June 1984 v West Indies

Domestic team information
- Years: Team
- 1973–1986: Derbyshire
- 1983/84: Natal
- 1987–1989: Essex
- 1990: Derbyshire
- 1991–1994: Cheshire

Career statistics
Competition	Test	ODI	FC	LA
Matches	34	25	383	334
Runs scored	1,213	136	12,027	4,234
Batting average	25.80	8.50	26.49	20.16
100s/50s	0/7	0/0	2/72	0/17
Top score	98*	46	130	88*
Balls bowled	5,149	1,268	59,221	13,389
Wickets	60	25	888	278
Bowling average	30.98	32.52	27.98	29.44
5 wickets in innings	1	0	39	4
10 wickets in match	0	0	7	0
Best bowling	5/44	3/27	8/70	4/22
Catches/stumpings	17/–	4/–	309/–	110/–
Medal record
Men's Cricket
Representing England
ICC Cricket World Cup
Runner-up	1979 England
- Source: CricketArchive, 18 July 2010

Geoffrey Miller, OBE (born 8 September 1952) is an English former cricketer, who played in 34 Test matches and 25 One Day Internationals for the England cricket team between 1976 and 1984. Nicknamed "Dusty", he played for Derbyshire from 1973 to 1986, captaining the team from 1979 to 1981 (following the sudden resignation of David Steele after six weeks in the role), and returned in 1990 after playing for Essex between 1987 and 1989. He was an England selector from 2008 to 2013 and was appointed President of Derbyshire C.C.C. in March 2014. He was a part of the English squad which finished as runners-up at the 1979 Cricket World Cup.

The cricket writer, Colin Bateman, noted, "Geoff Miller concedes that he probably enjoyed cricket too much. He did not take it as seriously as some, And when it became a rigorous, grim-faced business, he was not sorry to bow out of an eight-year Test career that never reached the peaks many expected". Likewise Simon Hughes referred to Miller in 1990 as being "the only remaining player who unfailingly visited the opposing team's dressing room after play to thank them for the game ... [and] the last man to field at slip with a whoopee cushion up his jumper"

== Early life ==
Born 8 September 1952, Chesterfield, Derbyshire, England Miller was educated at Chesterfield Grammar School.

Miller tells a story that when he was seven years-old, he awoke at 5am on January 10, 1959: "I went downstairs because I heard a noise. My father was making a fire. I asked him what the noise was - he had the radio on. He told me that on the radio was the Ashes. This is England versus Australia, at cricket, in Australia. They're playing in Sydney. Fred Trueman was bowling to Norman O'Neil. He said: "Just think. One day, I could be listening to you playing for England, in Australia, for the Ashes."

In 2016, Miller explained his nickname: "If your name is Miller or a Rhodes up north in England, then your nickname is always Dusty. A miller makes flour in a mill, so dusty. Nothing clever at all".

== County career ==
From 1971 he was playing in Derbyshire Second XI and in young cricketer's teams. He made his first-class debut for Derbyshire in July 1973, in a match against Somerset, when he scored a duck in his only innings. He was the Cricket Writers' Club Young Cricketer of the Year in 1976. Miller became Derbyshire captain in 1979, and in the 1981 season, was a part of the Derbyshire team which won the National Westminster Bank Trophy. Although not captain that day, Miller was at the wicket with Colin Tunnicliffe to scramble the run they needed from the last ball in the final to secure victory. Miller went to Essex in 1987, helping them to win the 1989 Refuge Assurance Cup, but returned to Derbyshire for his last first-class season in 1990, when Derbyshire won the Refuge Assurance League. In 1991, he played Minor counties cricket for Cheshire.

Miller was a correct right-handed batsman and a reliable right-arm off-break bowler, taking 888 wickets in 283 first-class matches (1973–1990) and 278 wickets in 334 List A matches (1973–1994). Notwithstanding his undoubted ability as a batsman, he only made two first-class centuries, although reaching 50 on 72 other occasions.

== International career ==
Miller made his Test debut for England against West Indies in 1976. He took 60 wickets in thirty four Tests and 25 wickets in twenty five ODIs for England. Unusually for a spin bowler, none of his 60 wickets were by a stumping. Miller never scored a test century despite twice coming extremely close scoring 98 against both Pakistan away in 1977/8 (not out) and India at home in 1982. Wisden observed that on the first such occasion, Miller, "seeking his maiden first-class century" in his first Test overseas, "though inflicted with a heavy cold and streaming eyes, had batted for six hours without serious fault". Later that winter he also made 89 in a Test against New Zealand at Christchurch, in spite of having to retire hurt part of the way through this innings.

His best series for England however was the 1978-79 Ashes. No England bowler took more than his 23 wickets in this series, at a low average of 15.04. Miller also finished a respectable fifth on the England batting averages for this series, ahead of the likes of Graham Gooch and Geoff Boycott, as England retained the Ashes against an Australia weakened by absences due to World Series Cricket. In the fifth test he shared a stand of 135 for the seventh wicket with his Derbyshire colleague Bob Taylor, and in the following test (another England victory) he took his only Test five-wicket haul, figures of 5 for 44.

Miller played in 25 one-day internationals for England and was part of the England squad for the 1979 Cricket World Cup, although he only played in one match in the tournament, against Canada. Miller also toured Australia in 1979-80 and West Indies in 1980–1 with England (coming up against full-strength teams with World Series Cricket players restored) with less success. On the latter tour he did however captain England to victory in one tour match against the Leeward Islands in March 1981, top-scoring with 91 not out in the first innings and taking 3 for 42 in the second. Indeed Wisden recorded of this tour that both England's only two first-class victories (the other being at the start of the tour against the West Indies Board President's XI in which Miller took match figures of 9 for 139) "were largely won by Miller who, after Willis's early departure, became a respected vice-captain. Yet he was kept out of the last three Tests by the presence of an outstanding off-spinner in Emburey, by Willey's success with the bat, and by his own illness in Jamaica".

Miller played at Melbourne in the fourth test of the 1982/3 Ashes series, the Boxing Day Test. Australia needed only three runs to assure at least a tie, which would have regained them the Ashes but with their last wicket standing. Ian Botham bowled to Jeff Thomson who edged the ball to the slip cordon. Chris Tavaré dropped the catch only for Miller to retrieve the ball before it hit the ground, England thus winning by three runs. However, the final test of the series ended in a draw, meaning Australia won the series 2-1 and anyway regained the Ashes.

Miller played his last Test match in 1984 against the West Indies at Lord's. Like most England players of his era he found the West Indies his toughest opponents, finishing on the losing team in each of his four Test matches against them.

== National Selector ==
Miller was elected as National Selector by the England and Wales Cricket Board in January 2008. He led a panel, which then contained Ashley Giles, Peter Moores and James Whitaker. He previously served on the panel of his predecessor David Graveney since 2000.

Miller also ran Moss & Miller, a sporting goods emporium in Chesterfield, with Chesterfield F.C. footballer Ernie Moss, for a number of years. He also became a popular after-dinner speaker.

He was appointed Officer of the Order of the British Empire (OBE) in the 2014 New Year Honours for services to cricket, following his retirement as an England selector at the end of 2013.

Sporting positions
Preceded by David Steele	Derbyshire cricket captain 1979–1981	Succeeded by Barry Wood
