= Roger Finney =

English cricketer (born 1960)

Roger John Finney (born 2 August 1960) is a former English cricketer. He was a right-handed batsman and a left-arm medium-pace swing bowler.

Finney first played for the Derbyshire Second XI in 1978, when he represented them for the first time in the Second XI Championship. He played Second XI and Under-25 cricket for the next four years before breaking into Derbyshire's senior team. He made his first appearance as a lower-middle-order batsman in 1982, and played in the County Championship consistently until 1988, when through injury he suffered a decline in his bowling form and found himself out of the first XI. He continued for a season in the second team, until in 1989 the injury forced his retirement from the first-class game.

In 1989 he started playing for Norfolk, in the Minor Counties Championship and, in the final game of his career, as an opening batsman in the NatWest Trophy.

Throughout his career with Derbyshire, he played as a middle-order batsman, and a consistent bowler, with a first-class average with the ball peaking at 27 in 1985. In all he played 212 matches for Derbyshire scoring over 3700 runs and taking over 270 wickets.
