= Bernie Maher =

English cricketer and fly-fishing international

Personal information
- Full name: Bernard Joseph Michael Maher
- Born: 11 February 1961 (age 65); Hillingdon, Middlesex, England
- Batting: Right-handed
- Role: Wicketkeeper/ Batsman

Domestic team information
- Years: Team
- 1981–93: Derbyshire
- First-class debut: 29 July 1981 Derbyshire v Gloucestershire
- Last First-class: 28 June 1993 Derbyshire v Lancashire
- List A debut: 2 August 1981 Derbyshire v Essex
- Last List A: 27 June 1993 Derbyshire v Lancashire

Career statistics
Competition	First-class	List A
Matches	133	111
Runs scored	3689	1177
Batting average	21.82	16.12
100s/50s	4/17	–/2
Top score	126	78
Balls bowled	270	–
Wickets	4	–
Bowling average	58.50	–
5 wickets in innings	–	–
10 wickets in match	–	–
Best bowling	2/69	–
Catches/stumpings	289/14	105/12
- Source: CricketArchive, 1 November 2010

Bernard Joseph Michael Maher (born 11 February 1961) was an English professional cricketer and a fly-fishing international. He was born in Hillingdon in West London.

As a cricketer, he was a right-handed batsman and a wicket-keeper who played first-class cricket for Derbyshire from 1981 and 1995.

He played age-group cricket for Middlesex County Cricket Club. In 1977, when he played for Middlesex's Second XI, before pursuing his academic studies.

He began reading Economics and Accountancy at Loughborough University in 1978 graduating with a BSc in 1981. Captaining Loughborough University, against Derbyshire in 1981, he was asked to play a series of 2nd team games. And his 1st class debut was against Gloucestershire County Cricket Club in July 1981, and Derbyshire signed him on a two-year contract.

Against the New Zealand's tourists in 1986, Maher scored 126, and there were other hundreds against Leicestershire County Cricket Club, Surrey County Cricket Club, and Cambridge University.

After his retirement from cricket in 1995, he continued commentating for BBC Radio and, after his cricketing days came to a close, worked as a financial consultant, and a fly-fishing instructor.

He is the owner of a day ticket fishing business in Ashover and works as a fly fishing guide.
