= Paul Newman (cricketer) =

English cricketer (born 1959)

Personal information
- Full name: Paul Geoffrey Newman
- Born: 10 January 1959 (age 67); Evington, Leicester, England
- Batting: Right-handed
- Bowling: Right-arm fast-medium

Domestic team information
- Years: Team
- 1980–1989: Derbyshire
- 1990: Durham
- 1991-1995: Staffordshire
- FC debut: 20 August 1980 Derbyshire v Middlesex
- Last FC: 10 August 1994 Minor Counties v South Africans
- LA debut: 31 August 1980 Derbyshire v Sussex
- Last LA: 28 August 2003 Norfolk v Lincolnshire

Career statistics
Competition	FC	LA
Matches	135	177
Runs scored	2,956	1,172
Batting average	15.65	14.83
100s/50s	1/5	0/2
Top score	115	56*
Balls bowled	18,165	8,513
Wickets	315	187
Bowling average	31.25	29.94
5 wickets in innings	6	0
10 wickets in match	0	0
Best bowling	8/29	4/21
Catches/stumpings	37/0	34
- Source: CricketArchive, 27 January 2014

Paul Geoffrey Newman (born 10 January 1959) is an English former cricketer who played for Derbyshire County Cricket Club between 1980 and 1989.

Newman was born in Evington, Leicester, and his cricketing career started in the 1976 Second XI season, playing with the Leicestershire second XI, where he played until the end of the 1979 season. He was spotted by Derbyshire, who picked him up and handed him a first-class debut towards the end of the 1980 season. Newman continued playing for Derbyshire throughout nine years and was in the victorious National Westminster Bank Trophy team in the 1981 season. His highest first-class score was an innings of 115, the only century of his career, against Leicestershire in 1985. Newman's best bowling figures were 8–29 against Yorkshire in the 1988 season. He played his penultimate match in 1989 against Gloucestershire.

From 1990 Newman played for Norfolk in the Minor Counties Championship and made 12 appearances for them in the NatWest Trophy/C&G Trophy. During this time he also represented a combined Minor Counties cricket team in the Benson & Hedges Cup and also played for this team against the touring South Africans in 1994.

Newman was a right-handed batsman and played 171 innings in 135 first-class matches with an average of 15.65 and a top score of 115. He was a right-arm medium-fast bowler and took 315 first-class wickets with an average of 31.25 and a best performance of 8 for 29.
