= Alan Hill (cricketer) =

English cricketer and umpire (born 1950)

Personal information
- Born: 29 June 1950 (age 76); Buxworth, Derbyshire, England
- Batting: Right-handed
- Bowling: Right arm off spin
- Role: Batsman, umpire

Domestic team information
- Years: Team
- 1972–1986: Derbyshire
- 1976/77: Orange Free State
- First-class debut: 30 August 1972 Derbyshire v Somerset
- Last First-class: 16 September 1986 Derbyshire v Somerset
- List A debut: 10 September 1972 Derbyshire v Somerset
- Last List A: 14 September 1986 Derbyshire v Somerset

Career statistics
Competition	First-class	List A
Matches	258	155
Runs scored	12356	3518
Batting average	30.89	26.45
100s/50s	18/65	4/15
Top score	172*	153
Balls bowled	554	84
Wickets	9	3
Bowling average	40.55	20.66
5 wickets in innings	0	0
10 wickets in match	0	n/a
Best bowling	3/5	3/32
Catches/stumpings	97/–	28/–
- Source: CricketArchive, 30 September 2008

Alan Hill (born 29 June 1950) is a former English cricketer and umpire who played for Derbyshire from 1972 to 1986 and for Orange Free State in South Africa in 1976/77.

Hill was born in Buxworth, Derbyshire and began playing for Derbyshire Juniors in 1965. He progressed to the Second XI by 1970 and in 1972 made his first-class debut against Somerset. He was a right-handed batsman, who usually opened for Derbyshire, and an occasional off-break bowler. In first-class cricket, he hit 65 fifties and 18 hundreds, giving him a career average of 30.89. His occasional off-break bowling took only a modest 9 wickets.

Hill is one of only two cricketers to make a century without hitting a boundary, a record that he shares with Paul Hibbert, making 103 in the match for Orange Free State v Griqualand West in 1976–77.

After he retired Hill became an umpire at first-class and List A level, but stopped after only two seasons. He began coaching cricket, working in many schools, and until the end of the 2009 season, was head coach for Newcastle-under-Lyme School.

His brother, Bernard Hill, made several appearances for the Derbyshire Second XI, but never made it to first-class level.
