= Bruce Roberts (cricketer) =

Zambian cricketer (born 1962)

Bruce Roberts (born 30 May 1962) is a former Zambian cricketer who played for Transvaal from 1982/83 to 1988/89 and for Derbyshire from 1984 to 1991. He made over 9000 runs in the first-class game and over 3,700 in the one day game.

Roberts was born in Lusaka and educated in Zimbabwe. He began his first-class career in South Africa in 1982 with Transvaal and Transvaal B. In 1984 he began his career in the game in England when he joined Derbyshire. Roberts evolved from a lower-order batsman into a stroke-maker and occasional bowler. When Roberts played his second English season, this change in the order repaid handsomely, as he scored his maiden century.

He was a major force in the Sunday league Derbyshire team which won the championship in the 1987 season, and in 1988, his Transvaal team were victorious in the Currie Cup, earning him the award of South African Cricketer of the Year. Roberts played extensively through the 1989 and 1990 season, and played one match in 1991 before hanging up his bat.

Roberts was a right-handed batsman and a right-arm medium-pace bowler. Throughout his career, he was a middle-lower order batsman and a consistent bowler, with decent batting and bowling averages moderately better than thirty in both cases.
