= Alan Warner (cricketer) =

English cricketer

Personal information
- Full name: Alan Esmond Warner
- Born: 12 May 1957 (age 69); Winson Green, Warwickshire, England
- Batting: Right-handed
- Bowling: Right-arm fast-medium

Domestic team information
- Years: Team
- 1982–1984: Worcestershire
- 1985–1996: Derbyshire
- 2000: Worcestershire Cricket Board

Career statistics
Competition	First-class	List A
Matches	200	227
Runs scored	3,763	1,356
Batting average	17.10	12.44
100s/50s	–/15	–/2
Top score	95*	68
Balls bowled	26,942	10,154
Wickets	426	275
Bowling average	31.45	27.81
5 wickets in innings	8	1
10 wickets in match	1	–
Best bowling	6/21	5/39
Catches/stumpings	46/–	30/–
- Source: Cricinfo, 15 June 2022

Alan Esmond Warner (born Birmingham, Warwickshire, England 12 May 1957) is an English former cricketer who played for Worcestershire from 1982 to 1984 and for Derbyshire from 1985 to 1996.

As a right-handed batsman he played 272 innings in 200 first-class matches at an average of 17.10. As a right-arm medium-fast bowler he captured 426 wickets at an average of 31.45.
