= John Morris (cricketer, born 1964) =

English cricketer

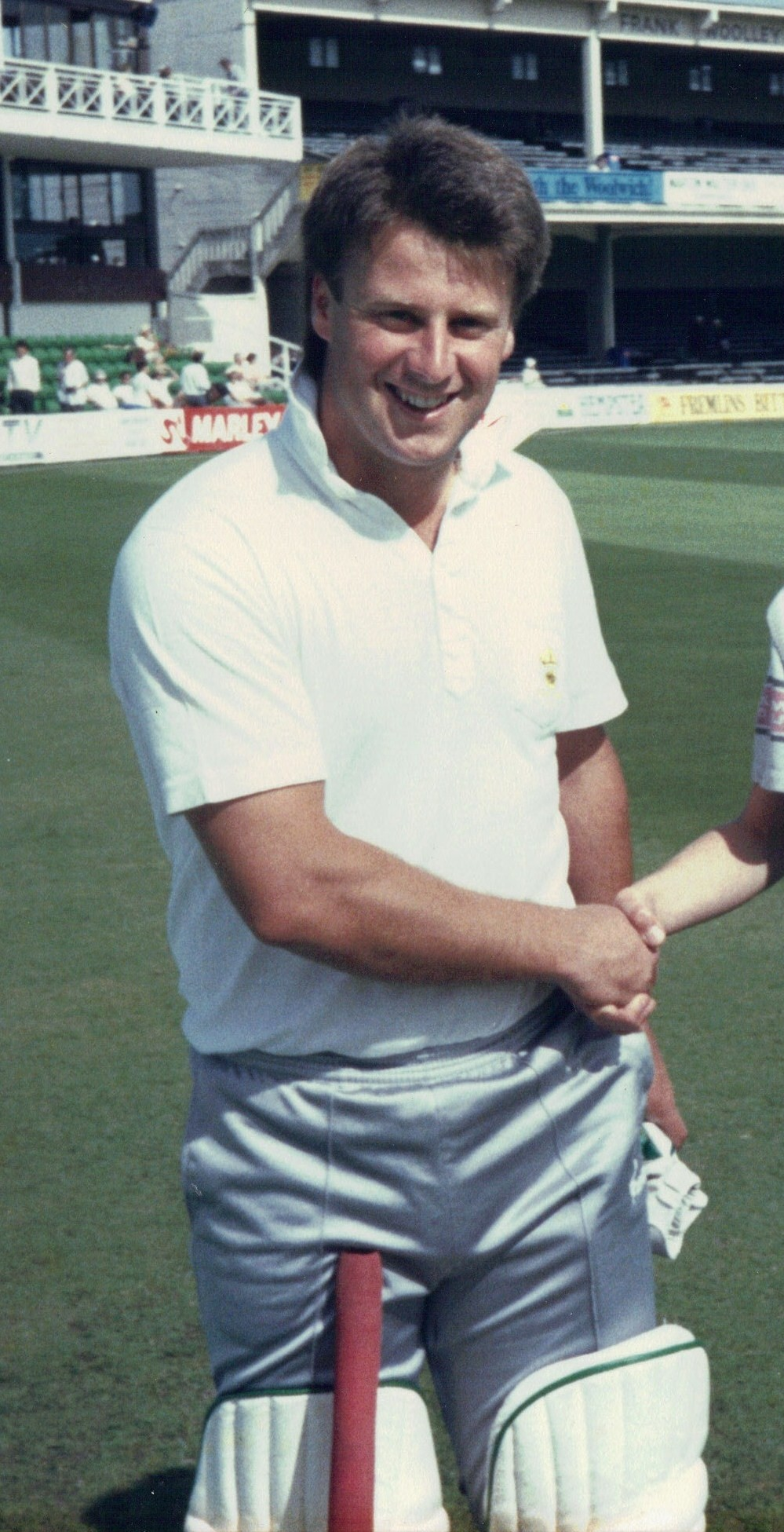

Personal information
- Full name: John Edward Morris
- Born: 1 April 1964 (age 62); Crewe, Cheshire, England
- Batting: Right-handed
- Bowling: Right-arm medium

International information
- National side: England
- Test debut (cap 545): 26 July 1990 v India
- Last Test: 23 August 1990 v India
- ODI debut (cap 109): 1 December 1990 v New Zealand
- Last ODI: 10 January 1991 v Australia

Domestic team information
- Years: Team
- 1982–1993: Derbyshire
- 1994–1999: Durham
- 2000–2001: Nottinghamshire

Career statistics
Competition	Test	ODI	FC	LA
Matches	3	8	362	350
Runs scored	71	167	21,539	8,362
Batting average	23.66	23.85	37.32	27.06
100s/50s	0/0	0/1	52/104	10/50
Top score	32	63*	229	145
Balls bowled	–	–	1,034	81
Wickets	–	–	8	1
Bowling average	–	–	119.75	66.00
5 wickets in innings	–	–	0	0
10 wickets in match	–	–	0	0
Best bowling	–	–	1/6	1/44
Catches/stumpings	3/–	2/–	156/–	83/–
- Source: CricketArchive, 8 May 2014

John Edward Morris (born 1 April 1964) is an English former cricketer, who played for England in three Test matches and eight One Day Internationals in 1990 and 1991. He played first-class cricket for Derbyshire from 1982 to 1993, for Durham from 1994 to 1999 and for Nottinghamshire in 2000 and 2001.

The cricket writer, Colin Bateman, commented that Morris was, "a talented and potentially destructive middle-order batsman".

== Career ==
Morris joined Derbyshire in 1980. He made his first-class debut in the 1982 season against the touring Pakistanis and remained a consistent first-team player for twenty-one years, helping Derbyshire to win the Refuge Assurance League in 1990 and the Benson and Hedges Cup three years later.

Morris was picked for the three-match Test series at home against India in 1990. He took three catches in the first match and his highest score was 32 in the second innings of the third Test at the Oval, following on.

Morris was selected for the tour to Australia in 1990–1991, and performed adequately enough in the tour matches, scoring 132 against Queensland just before the fourth Test. However, during the same up-country tour game at Carrara, Morris chose to join former Test captain David Gower in a practical joke that backfired, each man hiring a Tiger Moth Biplane to fly over the ground as play continued below. According to some reports, Gower "buzzed" the ground. England management responded by not selecting Morris for any of the Test matches, or indeed any Test match ever again. Both players were fined £1,000, the maximum under the terms of their contract, with Peter Lush and touring captain, Graham Gooch, considered sending the pair home from the tour.

Morris was selected for eight matches during the One Day International series on this tour, his best performance being a top score of 63 not out in a match at Adelaide, which was not enough to see England to victory. In his seven other ODIs, he only scored 20 or more runs on one occasion. Following the tour, Morris never played representative cricket for England again.

After a long career at Derbyshire, Morris moved to Durham in 1994; in June of the same year, while playing against Warwickshire, Brian Lara knocked a boundary from a delivery off Morris' occasional bowling as he reached the highest score in first-class cricket history, 501 not out. Morris moved to Nottinghamshire in 2000 and retired in 2001.

Morris was a stocky, right-handed middle-order batsman and made 21,539 runs in 362 first-class matches, including 52 centuries at an average of 37.72. He made 8,362 runs in 350 List A matches, with 10 centuries and an average of 27.06.

Morris was later employed as Head of Cricket at Derbyshire but was sacked in May 2011, during the club's County Championship match against Essex.

In 2018, Morris along with his son, opened a wine bar called Bradmans in Duffield, Derbyshire.
