= Kim Barnett =

English cricketer

Personal information
- Full name: Kim John Barnett
- Born: 17 July 1960 (age 66); Leek, Staffordshire, England
- Height: 6 ft 1.5 in (1.87 m)
- Batting: Right-handed
- Bowling: Right-arm leg-break

International information
- National side: England
- Test debut: 25 August 1988 v Sri Lanka
- Last Test: 6 July 1989 v Australia

Domestic team information
- Years: Team
- 1979–1998: Derbyshire
- 1982/83–1987/88: Boland
- 1984/85–1987/88: Impalas
- 1999–2002: Gloucestershire
- 2003–2010: Staffordshire

Career statistics
Competition	Test	ODI	FC	LA
Matches	4	1	479	527
Runs scored	207	84	28,593	15,564
Batting average	29.57	84.00	40.38	34.89
100s/50s	0/2	0/1	61/153	17/92
Top score	80	84	239*	136
Balls bowled	6	–	14,221	3,782
Wickets	0	–	188	113
Bowling average	–	–	37.80	26.37
5 wickets in innings	–	–	3	2
10 wickets in match	–	–	0	0
Best bowling	–	–	6/28	6/24
Catches/stumpings	1/–	0/–	284/–	174/–
- Source: CricketArchive, 14 July 2010

Kim John Barnett (born 17 July 1960) is an English former cricketer. Barnett was a batsman who played internationally for England between 1988 and 1989.

He was primarily a batsman, but could also deploy effective leg spin, and topped the English first-class bowling averages in 1994 with 13.30, albeit with only thirteen wickets to his name. Barnett was named one of the five Wisden Cricketers of the Year in 1989.

== Domestic career ==
He mainly played for Derbyshire, from 1979 to 1998 and Gloucestershire from 1999 to 2002. He also played for South African teams Boland and Impalas.

Barnett played the bulk of his county cricket career for Derbyshire, and was captain between 1983 and 1995. He remained at the club for several more years, until clashes with players and the county's committee resulted in his leaving for Gloucestershire in 1999. He was disappointed not to be offered a renewal of his contract after the 2002 season, and retired from first-class cricket, although he continued to play in regional league competitions.

Barnett scored 28,593 first-class runs in 479 matches at an average of 40.38, with 61 centuries and a top score of 239 not out, made against Leicestershire. He passed 1000 runs in a single season 16 times, including eleven consecutive seasons between 1983 and 1993.

== International career ==
Barnett played only four Test matches for England, partly as a result of bad fortune and partly of his own choice. He was selected for the 1988/89 tour to India, which was cancelled, and then accepted a place on the Mike Gatting led rebel tour of South Africa in 1989/90, and was immediately banned from Test cricket for three years.

In one-day cricket, according to former Gloucestershire coach John Bracewell, Barnett played a key role in a very successful side:

winning a "double double" in 1999 and 2000 (both the Benson and Hedges Cup and the C&G Trophy, in both seasons), while also pocketing the Sunday League in 2000 ... Key to all this was veteran opener Kim Barnett, who Bracewell described as "like Duckworth-Lewis before it was invented". It was Barnett who would first calculate the par score, then systematically plot the road map to that total.

== Coaching career ==
He was coach of the Minor Counties side, Staffordshire, and played for them on occasion.

== Outside cricket ==
Barnett used to play for Rocester F.C. and Leek Town before football took a back seat for cricket.

Sporting positions
Preceded by Barry Wood	Derbyshire cricket captains 1984–1995	Succeeded by Dean Jones
Preceded by New Appointment	Derbyshire Director of Cricket; 2016 to date	Succeeded by Incumbent
