= Sussex County Cricket Club in 2005 =

Sussex Sharks
2005 season
- Captain: Chris Adams
- Ground(s): Hove; Horsham; Arundel

Sussex County Cricket Club played in Division One of the County Championship and Division Two of the Totesport League in 2005. The 2003 County Champions started the season at 6–1 to retake the title.

After a draw against the Loughborough students, Sussex started their season at the Oval. It was a fixture seriously curtailed by the rain, which made a draw a certainty, though they were able to pick up 9 points. The next Championship game saw a close draw against Hampshire: a game which might have been won, but for negative play by their opponents at the crunch. They then beat Derbyshire in a thriller in the Sunday League, before a four-day loss to Nottinghamshire. The next day they went down to Yorkshire, and then on the May Day Bank Holiday their game with Durham was abandoned halfway through. On 4 May they easily beat Bedfordshire to progress to Round Two of the C&G Trophy.

They then beat Warwickshire in the totesport League, before securing a convincing innings victory against the same team in the County Championship, and then going on to beat the Bangladeshi tourists by an innings and 226 runs. On 18 May they beat Nottinghamshire to reach the Quarter-Finals of the C&G Trophy. There was then a draw against Middlesex which left them sixth in Division One of the Championship at the end of May. They then drew with Division One whipping boys Glamorgan in a game reduced to 3 days because of rain.

10 June saw an easy win against the Scottish Saltires, before drawing another rain-ravaged match with Nottinghamshire. In the National League on the following Sunday, they won a top-of-the-table clash with Durham, sending them within two points of the Northern lads. In the Twenty20 Cup, there were two meetings with Essex, each team winning one – in between, there was a rained-off match with Hampshire, in which both teams scored a point. Sussex then lost two successive matches, which was thought to permanently damage their quarter-final chances, but they recovered with wins over Hampshire and Kent which sent them into third place of the South Division. However, because they had fewer wins than Derbyshire in the North Division, they were knocked out as the worst third-place finisher.

Following on from their disappointing Twenty20 Cup exit, they lost by 35 runs to Hampshire at the Rose Bowl in the Championship, but recovered to beat Surrey Lions by 48 runs to go top of the National League. A low-scoring draw with Gloucestershire followed, which left both sides struggling in the relegation zone.

August began with an 11-run win over Somerset Sabres in the National League, which gave them a four-point lead in that competition. Following that, Sussex enjoyed a five-wicket win over Surrey in the County Championship which saw them jump past Surrey in the table. A loss to Leicestershire Foxes in the National League followed, however, but they carried their good Championship form into the return match with Gloucestershire to win by 226 runs. However, they lost yet again in the National League, as the Division Two title battle with Durham tightened.

The third week of August saw Sussex thump Middlesex inside two days, beating them by an innings and 232 runs – the highest margin of victory in the entire season – to temporarily go top of Division One, only 18 days after they had been precariously positioned in the relegation zone. However, the week ended with another loss to Leicestershire in the National League, which meant that Leicestershire also involved themselves in the title battle in Division Two. Three days later, Sussex beat Warwickshire in the same competition, mainly thanks to figures of 6–27 from Michael Yardy. In the County Championship, however, they lost to Warwickshire, before finishing August with two National League victories over Scotland and Surrey.

September began with a two-day victory over Glamorgan, which kept their slim Championship title hopes alive, but those were well and truly killed by Nottinghamshire's victory over Kent. However, other teams lost in the National League to give them promotion in that competition, and their fourth National League win in a row – over Kent Spitfires at St Lawrence Ground – left them in control of the race for the Division Two title. Sussex finished the Championship season with an eight-wicket victory over Kent, leaving them third in the Championship, and a win over Yorkshire Phoenix gave them the National League Division Two title.

== Players ==
- Mushtaq Ahmed
- Rana Naved-ul-Hasan
- Tim Ambrose
- Mark Davis
- Murray Goodwin
- Sean Heather
- Carl Hopkinson
- James Kirtley
- Jason Lewry
- Robin Martin-Jenkins
- Richard Montgomerie
- Chris Nash
- Matt Prior
- Neil Turk
- Ian Ward
- Luke Wright
- Michael Yardy

== Tables ==
=== Championship ===
2005 County Championship – Division One
Pos	Team	Pld	W	D	L	Pen	BP	Pts
1	Nottinghamshire	16	9	4	3	0	94	236
2	Hampshire	16	9	4	3	0.5	92	233.5
3	Sussex	16	7	6	3	0	102	224
4	Warwickshire	16	8	3	5	0.5	86	209.5
5	Kent	16	6	7	3	8.5	99	202.5
6	Middlesex	16	4	7	5	0.5	98	181.5
7	Surrey	16	4	9	3	8.5	97	180.5
8	Gloucestershire	16	1	5	10	2	72	104
9	Glamorgan	16	1	1	14	0	71	88.5

=== totesport League ===
2005 totesport League – Division Two
Pos	Team	Pld	W	L	NR	T	Pts
1	Sussex Sharks	18	13	4	1	0	54
2	Durham Dynamos	18	12	4	2	0	52
3	Warwickshire Bears	18	10	6	2	0	44
4	Leicestershire Foxes	18	10	7	1	0	42
5	Derbyshire Phantoms	18	9	7	1	1	40
6	Somerset Sabres	18	9	8	1	0	38
7	Surrey Lions	18	7	10	1	0	30
8	Kent Spitfires	18	6	10	2	0	28
9	Yorkshire Phoenix	18	5	13	0	0	20
10	Scottish Saltires	18	2	14	1	1	12

== Match details ==
=== Sussex v Loughborough UCCE (9–11 April) ===
Match drawn

The first day of this match, which was played at Hove, saw Loughborough dismissed for 237. Sussex then reached 15 for no loss at close. Sussex batted through the second day, adding 352 in the 105 overs available, after both Ian Ward and Richard Montgomerie both got centuries. Sussex were finally dismissed for 490 on the third and last day. This did not leave them enough time to dismiss Loughborough UCCE a second time, and they were 103 for 5 at the end of the match. (Cricinfo scorecard)

=== Surrey v Sussex (13–16 April) ===
Surrey (12pts) drew with Sussex (9pts)

Sussex won the toss at the Oval and elected to bat. Mark Ramprakash captained Surrey as Mark Butcher has still not recovered from the injury that saw him miss England's winter tour. Only 49 overs could be bowled on the first day, as rain delayed the start till after lunch, and bad light brought an early conclusion. Cloud cover helped the bowlers, but Sussex, thanks to Michael Yardy's 44 not out, finished the day on 171 for 4. The second day saw 61 overs. Yardy, again under cloud-covered skies, progressed to 111, which will have gone a long way to helping him cement a regular first team place. Rikki Clarke, who took 4 for 91, appears a yard quicker than last season, and to have improved after his poor season last year. Sussex finished the second day on 370, and Surrey on 6 for 1.

Only 13.3 overs were possible on a rain-affected third day, as Surrey moved to 33 for 1, with a draw a virtual certainty. The day was enlivened by the sight of a fox on top of one of the famous gasholders. It presumably went onto the top when the gasholder was low, and was trapped as the level rose. On the fourth day, Surrey's stand-in captain Ramprakash made an impressive 152, as Surrey elected to prolong their first innings until they reached 402 for 5 declared, to claim maximum batting points. The game ended there as a draw. (Cricinfo scorecard)

=== Sussex v Hampshire (20–23 April) ===
Sussex (9pts) drew with Hampshire (9pts)

Hampshire finished the first day on top at Hove. Sussex, despite a century from Michael Yardy, were all out for 252, with Chris Tremlett taking 6 for 44. In reply, the visitors reached 67 for 1. Only for the position to be reversed on the second day, as they were dismissed for 280, with James Kirtley claiming 4 and Robin Martin-Jenkins 3 wickets. Sussex finished on 101 for 2.

The game remained evenly poised on the third day, but with Sussex slightly in the lead, with rain predicted for the fourth. Sussex took their score on to 312, thereby setting a target of 285. Hampshire were on 89 for 3 at the end of day three. With rain predicted on the fourth day, the game could have gone any one of four ways. Kevin Pietersen (61), assisted by Sean Ervine (57), took the challenge to Sussex – and the game was always in the balance. When the eighth wicket fell, the score was on 256 for 8. And with 29 required off 34 balls, the game looked set for one of those exciting finishes that only the longer form of the game can provide. Disappointingly for the crowd, Hampshire captain Shane Warne ordered his batsmen to shut up shop. Sussex were unable to take the final two wickets, and on 267 for 8, the game was drawn. Hampshire finished the day second behind Warwickshire, but the ten points given up here had crucial repercussions later on in the season. (Cricinfo scorecard)

=== Sussex v Derbyshire (24 April) ===
Sussex (4pts) beat Derbyshire (0pts) by 2 runs (D/L method)

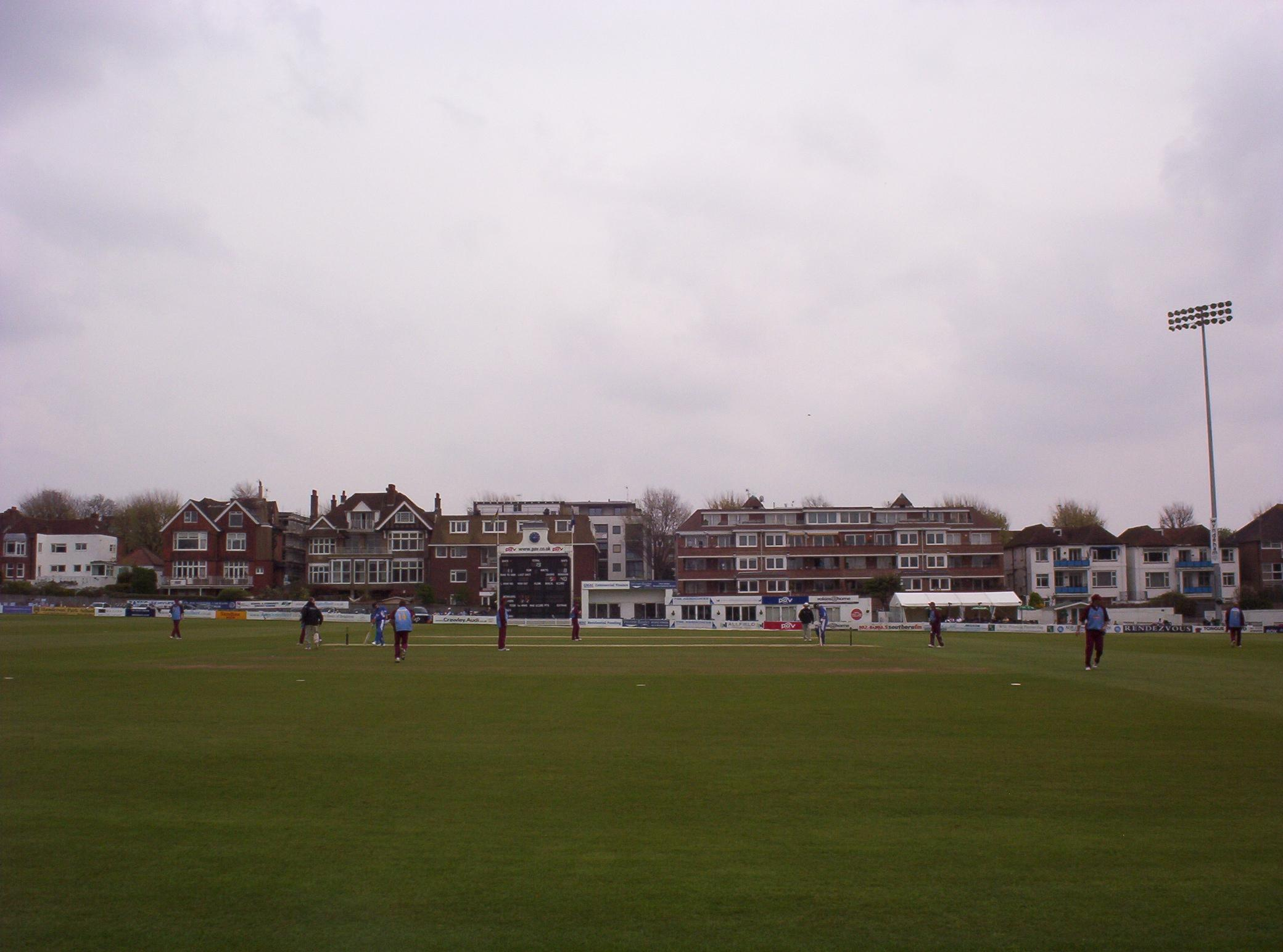
Derbyshire batting at Hove

A close game at Hove saw the Sharks defeat the Phantoms by 2 runs, after Tom Lungley went for, and failed to get, a six of the last ball to win the game. It was a high scoring affair, and halfway through their overs Sussex looked on target for a big total approaching 300. However, Derbyshire did well to peg them back to 254 to 8.

Rain delayed the restart, and left the Phantoms with 205 to win off 32 overs. They were always behind par, but never quite gave up. Indeed, Graeme Welch nearly won it for them with 42 off 24 balls, which included three huge sixes. However, wickets tumbled, leaving Tom Lungley with the last ball to score six. To his credit, he went for it and could have won, but fell short and was run out. (Cricinfo scorecard)

=== Nottinghamshire v Sussex (27–30 April) ===
Nottinghamshire (22pts) beat Sussex (6pts) by ten wickets

Only 36.3 overs were possible on the first day at Trent Bridge. Sussex batted first and, despite losing 2 early wickets, were 116 for 2 at close, with Michael Yardy (38) and Murray Goodwin (33) the not out batsmen. Yardy went on to make a half-century, as did wicket-keeper Matt Prior and Robin Martin-Jenkins, but no-one went further than 66 on the second day, as Sussex were dismissed for 379. Nottinghamshire progressed slowly, and were 32 for no loss off 15 overs at close.

The third day was all Nottinghamshire's. Jason Gallian made his highest score for the county, 199, while Stephen Fleming, who took over as captain from Gallian this season, made 111. Both were run out by precise throws from Ian Ward and Mushtaq Ahmed respectively. David Hussey (89) and Chris Read (45 not out) gave good support as Notts reached 488 for 6 at close.

On the fourth day, Nottinghamshire declared after 5.5 overs on 509 for 8, a lead of 130. If they were to win, they'd have to dismiss Sussex quickly. This they did. Ryan Sidebottom took 4 for 15 as Sussex were dismissed for 159, despite a two-hour 49 from Martin-Jenkins. Darren Bicknell and Jason Gallian only needed 5.5 overs to knock off the 30 runs needed to win. (Cricinfo scorecard)

=== Yorkshire v Sussex (1 May) ===
Yorkshire (4pts) beat Sussex (0pts) by 3 wickets

Richard Dawson and Craig White took 3 wickets apiece to help dismiss the Sharks for 157, as Sussex lost the last 7 wickets for 55 runs. Despite tight bowling from Mushtaq Ahmed on a damp pitch, the Phoenix eased to a win with 3 wickets and 27 balls remaining. Anthony McGrath (37) and Ian Harvey (30) shared a fifth-wicket stand of 63. (BBC scorecard)

=== National League: Durham v Sussex (2 May) ===
No result – Durham (2pts), Sussex (2pts)

At Chester-le-Street Durham Dynamos won the toss and put Sussex Sharks in to bat. Steve Harmison bowled well for his 1 for 24 off 9 overs, though it was Mick Lewis who took the wickets, ending with 5 for 48. For the Sharks, Johannes van der Wath top scored with 80 and shared a 110-run partnership with Robin Martin-Jenkins to pull Sussex out from 60 for 5 to a final total of 182 for 7 in 45 overs. In reply the Dynamos slumped to 9 for 2 off 7.3 overs, losing both openers for ducks before rain came and finished the match 15 balls before Duckworth-Lewis could be applied. (Cricinfo scorecard)

=== Bedfordshire v Sussex (4 May) ===
Sussex beat Bedfordshire by 8 wickets to progress to Round Two of the C&G Trophy

Bedfordshire batted first at Luton. They progressed slowly, making their first 50 in the 23rd over. Whilst they improved to 143 for 9 in their 50 overs, it was never going to be enough. By way of comparison, it took Sussex six overs to reach their first 50, with Ian Ward (65 off 44) scoring most of the early runs, although admittedly batting was easier on the drying pitch. Sussex overhauled their modest target with 31.3 overs to go – almost two thirds of their allotted quota. (Cricinfo scorecard)

=== Sussex v Warwickshire (8 May) ===
Sussex (4pts) beat Warwickshire (0pts) by 44 runs (D/L method)

Sussex Sharks had England wicket-keeper Matt Prior and former Zimbabwe batsman Murray Goodwin to thank for their imposing win over the Bears. Prior scored 144 – a career best score – and Goodwin 79 to lift Sussex to a massive 283 for 7, Zimbabwe all-rounder Heath Streak the only bowler with reasonably respectable figures of three for 39 off 9 overs. The reply was shortened by rain, setting Warwickshire 198 to win off 30 overs, but after 48 from Neil Carter there was little left in the Warwickshire reply as they finished on 153 for 7. (Cricinfo scorecard)

=== Sussex v Warwickshire (10–12 May) ===
Sussex (21pts) beat Warwickshire (2pts) by an innings and 87 runs

Michael Yardy (88) and Murray Goodwin (108) as Sussex made 282 for 6 on the first day at Hove. Batting was not easy, with Heath Streak, Dewald Pretorius and Neil Carter all swinging the ball. On the second day, Sussex moved to 412 all out, and in reply, defending champions Warwickshire made 141 for 5. There was worse news for England cricket fans as Ashley Giles was unable to field because of a strained hip flexor muscle. Giles said, "It's a shame because it's been going really well. It's the best start to a season I've had but the hip was a bit stiff last week and it got worse yesterday. I haven't had this kind of injury before so, even without the England situation, it would be stupid to make it any worse."

On the third day, Sussex completed the match. Warwickshire were all out for 179, and then, following-on they were dismissed again for 146. Fifteen wickets fell in 64 overs as the Sussex bowlers made the most of an erratically bouncing pitch. It was Warwickshire's first Championship loss since the last day of the 2003 season. (Cricinfo scorecard)

=== Sussex v Bangladeshis (15–17 May) ===
Sussex beat the Bangladeshis by an innings and 226 runs

Sussex recorded a big victory at Hove, smacking the Bangladeshi bowlers at will before bowling them out twice for a pittance, which did not exactly give the Bangladeshis confidence a week before the first Test at Lord's. Michael Yardy was the star of the match, notching up 35 fours and two sixes in a towering 257 – the highest score of the English first class season so far – which led Sussex to 549 for 7 declared. In reply, Habibul Bashar got hit by a bouncer from Jason Lewry when on 22 not out, and thus had to retire, and things only went downhill from there. The Bangladeshis could only manage a total of 323 runs from two innings (127 and 196), with 16-year-old wicketkeeper Mushfiqur Rahim the only one who passed forty runs with a two-hour 63 in the second innings, before being stumped off a delivery by the Man of the Match, Yardy – who recorded his first career five-wicket haul, taking five for 83. (Cricinfo scorecard)

=== Sussex v Nottinghamshire (18 May) ===
Sussex beat Nottinghamshire by 4 wickets to progress to the Quarter-Finals of the C&G Trophy

Nottinghamshire got off to a bad start at Hove by losing their first 3 wickets for only 12 runs. They continued to lose wickets at regular intervals until the score moved on to 111 for 8, when Samit Patel (61) and Gareth Clough (22) came together and lifted the total to 195 for 9 off the 50 overs. Three Nottinghamshire batsmen were run out. Sussex immediately lost Ian Ward and Mike Yardy, moving to 1 run for 2 wickets. However, the ship was steadied with half-centuries from Murray Goodwin and Carl Hopkinson and they eventually eased through with 3 wickets and 18 balls to go. The win, however, came at a price for Sussex, who now had to play Lancashire away in the next round, rather than host the touring Australians in a 3-day game. The cost of the win was estimated at £50,000. (Cricinfo scorecard)

=== Sussex v Middlesex (25–28 May) ===
Middlesex (12pts) drew with Sussex (10pts)

James Kirtley took his first five-wicket-haul of the season at Hove to peg back Middlesex in a match where Middlesex were otherwise well in control. Nine of their batsmen went into double figures, Irishman Ed Joyce making another fine score with 82, but Kirtley's six for 80 saved some of their blushes. In reply, Irfan Pathan dug out two Sussex wickets early to give Middlesex a good chance, but Chris Adams, the captain, fought back with a fine 72 while 33-year-old Zimbabwe exile Murray Goodwin made 67, and a good fight-back from the lower-order lifted Sussex to 332. Mushtaq Ahmed plugged away to make 57, while Kirtley helped out with a 95-ball 14, to defy Pathan, who nevertheless got fine figures of four for 81 in his debut in England.

Jason Lewry then took six Middlesex wickets for 65 runs, reducing them to 244, although if it had not been Jamie Dalrymple's (65) and Paul Weekes' (71) partnership of 140 for the sixth wicket, things would have looked even nastier for Middlesex. In reply, Sussex were cautious in their chase of 314, but a big partnership between Richard Montgomerie and Murray Goodwin nearly won it for them. However, New Zealand all-rounder Scott Styris took four Sussex wickets for 79, and Alan Richardson took four for 38 – including Goodwin and skipper Adams. Sussex lost four wickets for 17 runs to crash to 280 for 6, but Kirtley and Lewry held out as Sussex finished 28 runs short of a victory and Middlesex finished one wicket short of victory in this bottom-fight. (BBC scorecard)

=== Somerset v Sussex (30 May) ===
Sussex (4pts) beat Somerset (0pts) by 2 wickets

Sussex edged past Somerset with 2 balls and 2 wickets remaining. Somerset won the toss, batted, and fell to 88 for 5 against Sussex's tight bowling before Ian Blackwell smashed 10 sixes and 10 fours as he made 134 not out off only 71 balls. 4 of his sixes came in the 40th over, bowled by Mushtaq Ahmed: the first three balls went for six, then there were two singles, before Blackwell smashed the last ball out of the ground into the car park. His quickfire innings helped Somerset to 297 for 6 off their 45 overs. In reply Matt Prior made 77, but Sussex looked like a defeated side after 4 wickets from Keith Parsons sent them to 201 for 7, but Johannes van der Wath smashed 73 off 43 balls to sneak the victory, sharing an 82-run ninth-wicket stand with Jason Lewry. (Cricinfo scorecard)

=== Glamorgan v Sussex (1–4 June) ===
Sussex (12pts) drew with Glamorgan (8pts)

Glamorgan avoided defeat again despite following on at Swansea, mainly thanks to the first day being rained off. On the second day, which was also shortened, Sussex scored 225 for 2 after Glamorgan won the toss and put them in. Two Sussex batsmen reached their highest scores of 2005 on the third morning, as Richard Montgomerie ended with 184 not out – 12 off his career best – and Murray Goodwin reached 158. Sussex finally declared on 497 for 5, and in reply Matthew Elliott made 85 and David Hemp 128 and Glamorgan reached 301, which was not enough to avoid the follow-on. The experienced fast bowler Jason Lewry took six for 77 for Sussex, while the Welsh team's new import, Indian captain Sourav Ganguly, scored a duck in his first innings. However, Glamorgan comfortably achieved a draw with Matthew Elliott striking 162 in the second innings. When time was called, Glamorgan were on 354 for 3. (Cricinfo scorecard)

=== Scotland v Sussex (10 June) ===
Sussex (4pts) beat Scotland (0pts) by 8 wickets

Scotland had a bad week. First, Asim Butt, the leading Scottish seam bowler was banned for a year after testing positive for ecstasy. They then went down heavily to Sussex Sharks at The Grange in their last home game before the 2005 ICC Trophy in three weeks' time. The Saltires batted first and lost wickets regularly. Only Colin Smith, with 61, made any sort of score as they were dismissed for 172. The Sharks chased down the target easily, as openers Matt Prior and Ian Ward put on 108, and whilst Scotland were able to take two wickets, Sussex sped home with 16.3 overs to spare. (Cricinfo scorecard)

=== Sussex v Nottinghamshire (15–18 June) ===
Sussex (11pts) drew with Nottinghamshire (11pts)

A rain-ravaged match at Arundel, where only seven overs were possible on the second day, ended in a drab draw. Batting first, Sussex needed seven sessions of play to make 355, despite only facing 87 overs, and Nottinghamshire were not overly excited in getting a result, either. Matt Prior, Murray Goodwin (in the second innings) and Chris Adams (also in the second innings) made tons for Sussex in the match, Stephen Fleming made one for the visitors, and Sussex' Jason Lewry was the pick of the bowlers with six for 74. (Cricinfo scorecard)

=== Sussex v Durham (19 June) ===
Sussex (4pts) beat Durham (0pts) by seven wickets

Durham Dynamos sorely missed their two international stars, Steve Harmison and Paul Collingwood, as they whimpered to a seven-wicket defeat in the top-of-the-table clash at Arundel against Sussex Sharks. Dale Benkenstein won the toss and chose to have his Durham side bat first, as he made 57 not out from number five, but there was woefully little support as Durham collapsed from 129 for 3 to 195 all out. James Kirtley was the main culprit with four for 29 but every Sussex bowler except Robin Martin-Jenkins got among the wickets. In reply, Ian Ward blitzed 93 off 75 balls, Chris Adams was just as punishing with 58 off 49, and Liam Plunkett was plundered for 46 off only four overs – including nine wides. In only 29.3 overs, the match was over, Sussex getting a bit of Twenty20 practice in as they closed the gap at the top of the table to two points. (Cricinfo scorecard)

=== Sussex v Essex (22 June) ===
Sussex (2pts) beat Essex (0pts) by nine wickets

Essex Eagles collapsed to lose their first match of the 2005 Twenty20 Cup to Sussex Sharks. Winning the toss and batting, Essex quickly made their way to 55 for 1, with Ronnie Irani hitting 34 off 18 balls. But two quick wickets set them back, Andy Flower was then run out, and Mushtaq Ahmed ended their innings with five for 11 from 21 deliveries – as Essex ended all out for 109. In a stately reply, Sussex did not hurry too much, as Matt Prior scored 66 off 50 balls, and 14 extras helped the Sharks past the target after 14.4 overs. (Cricinfo scorecard)

=== Hampshire v Sussex (24 June) ===
No result; Hampshire (1pt), Sussex (1pt)

Rain caused the match between Hampshire Hawks and Sussex Sharks to be abandoned. Despite the fact that a ball was not bowled, the match was declared a no-result since a toss was made. (Cricinfo scorecard)

=== Essex v Sussex (26 June) ===
Essex (2pts) beat Sussex (0pts) by 43 runs

After Johannes van der Wath had given Sussex Sharks the edge with two early wickets against Essex Eagles, Andy Flower and Ryan ten Doeschate rebuilt to send the hosts to 151 for 5 after their 20 overs. Sussex, however, imploded following the departure of Chris Adams for 44, as Grant Flower took three quick wickets, and James Middlebrook and Andre Adams mopped up the tail for just 108. (Cricinfo scorecard)

=== Sussex v Surrey (29 June) ===
Surrey (2pts) beat Sussex (0pts) by 5 wickets (D/L method)

A close, rain-damaged match at The County Ground, Hove eventually ended in Surrey Lions snaring a last-ball victory over Sussex Sharks. Batting first, the hosts made 139 for 6 in 17 overs, spinner Nayan Doshi taking three wickets despite being the most expensive of the bowlers, while Matt Prior top-scored with 51. A 28-ball fifty from Ali Brown then lifted Surrey to 74 for 1, but two run outs saw them lose their next four wickets for eight runs. Azhar Mahmood and Ian Salisbury, however, shared a 36-run partnership and saw them pass the revised target of 114 by two runs on the very last ball of the game. (Cricinfo scorecard)

=== Sussex v Hampshire (1 July) ===
Sussex (2pts) beat Hampshire (0pts) by 10 runs

A twelve-over game at Hove was won by Sussex Sharks, though the rain threatened to destroy it all. Ian Ward and Matt Prior opened the batting for Sussex, who had been sent in to bat by Hampshire Hawks' captain Shaun Udal, and they made good use of it, sending Sussex to 53 for 0. Two quick wickets from Sean Ervine slowed the Sharks' progression, as they slumped to 88 for 5, but Michael Yardy hit 10 in four balls in an unbeaten 11-run sixth-wicket stand with Carl Hopkinson. Chasing, Hampshire never quite kept up with the required run rate, as Mushtaq Ahmed took three for 19 in his three overs to be the main cause of the Hawks' demise, and Hampshire finished on 89 for 6. (Cricinfo scorecard)

=== Sussex v Middlesex (4 July) ===
No result; Sussex (1pt), Middlesex (1pt)

Seven overs of play was possible at The County Ground, Hove, before rain intervened. Owais Shah made 30 not out off 20 balls to see Middlesex Crusaders to a healthy 56 for 1, but Sussex Sharks never got the chance to chase as the game was abandoned. (Cricinfo scorecard)

=== Kent v Sussex (5 July) ===
No result; Kent (1pt), Sussex (1pt)

In eleven overs of play, Kent Spitfires moved to 91 for 1, Andrew Hall making 43 not out as Sussex Sharks' new man, Pakistani Naved-ul-Hasan made his debut with nought for 10 in two overs. Then, rain made play impossible. (Cricinfo scorecard)

=== Surrey v Sussex (6 July) ===
Sussex (2pts) beat Surrey (0pts) by three wickets

Surrey Lions were consistently pegged back by the Sussex Sharks' bowling at The Oval, having been put in to bat by Sussex captain Chris Adams. Azhar Mahmood stood firm and knocked off 40 unbeaten runs, but Naved-ul-Hasan, James Kirtley and Mushtaq Ahmed all got two wickets for less than six runs an over as Surrey eventually had to settle for 144 for 8. In reply, Ian Ward made a quickfire 50, off 28 balls, before being bowled by Surrey off-spinner Nayan Doshi to send Sussex to 82 for 3. Adams and Murray Goodwin both made 28, while Azhar Mahmood took two for 21 from four overs. Eventually, a six from Naved-ul-Hasan won Sussex the game with three balls to spare to put them third in the table, but as they were the poorest third-placed side in the competition with only three wins, they were still knocked out. (Cricinfo scorecard)

=== Sussex v Kent (8 July) ===
Sussex (4pts) beat Kent (0pts) by four wickets

Sussex Sharks regained the lead in Division Two of the National League with a win over Kent Spitfires in a low-scoring match at The County Ground, Hove. Sussex' Pakistani cricketers Rana Naved-ul-Hasan and Mushtaq Ahmed took three and two wickets respectively, reducing Kent to 106 for 7, before James Kirtley mopped up the tail with three balls remaining of Kent's innings, for 155. Then, a fiery opening spell from Simon Cook, who had hit an unbeaten 28 with the bat, resulted in three quick wickets (he ended with excellent figures of three for 15 off nine overs) and sent Sussex down to 22 for 4. However, Michael Yardy and Carl Hopkinson paired up for 103 for the fifth wicket, and Yardy's 65 anchored a nervy chase as Sussex reached the target with 3.3 overs remaining. (Cricinfo scorecard)

=== Kent v Sussex (10–13 July) ===
Sussex (21pts) beat Kent (6pts) by 66 runs

Sussex took hand of a see-sawing match at Canterbury, mainly thanks to their Pakistani overseas players Rana Naved-ul-Hasan and Mushtaq Ahmed, who took fourteen wickets between them. The hosts Kent won the toss and put Sussex in to bat, and after an initial opening partnership of 65, two wickets fell quickly. However, an opener Ian Ward completed his century, and 63 from Murray Goodwin swung it Sussex's way to 210 for 2 before South African all-rounder Andrew Hall took two quick wickets. Sussex quickly slumped to 298 for 8, but captain Chris Adams stood firm, making 83 as Sussex batted into the second day – making 378 in the end. Curiously, Simon Cook of Kent bowled eleven maidens in 24 overs, but conceded 57 runs in the other 13.

Kent looked to be well on the way to posting a challenging total, as they were on 323 for 6 at stumps on day 2, with four of their batsmen making fifties. However, day three saw a total of twenty wickets tumble. First, Kent lost four wickets to be all out for 348, trailing by 30. Then, after Michael Yardy and Goodwin had rescued to Sussex to 89 for 2 after both openers had been removed for sub-20 scores, Sussex fell apart. Min Patel ran through the middle-order, Dane Amjad Khan took care of the tail, and Sussex were all out for 155, setting a target of 186. However, accurate bowling was enough to undo Kent, as no Kent batsmen passed 35 and Naved-ul-Hasan and Mushtaq Ahmed shared eight wickets – Kent were all out for 119, but retained the County Championship lead, as their closest competitors failed to win. (Cricinfo scorecard)

=== Lancashire v Sussex (15 July) ===
Lancashire beat Sussex by 35 runs to progress to the Semi-Finals of the C&G Trophy

Andrew Symonds scored 101 and took two wickets for 46 to be the difference between the sides at Old Trafford. Having been sent in to bat, Lancashire owed much of their success to a partnership of 118 between Symonds and Marcus North, and good lower-order hitting took the total to 249 for 8, despite three wickets each from Sussex' Pakistanis, Rana Naved-ul-Hasan and Mushtaq Ahmed. The Sussex chase looked on when they were 112 for 1 with Matt Prior and Chris Adams at the crease, as they were just waiting for opportunities to up the run-rate, but instead Symonds and England all-rounder Andrew Flintoff ran through them with the ball, and Robin Martin-Jenkins and Ahmed eventually had to consolidate to 214 for 8, losing by 35 runs. (Cricinfo scorecard)

=== Hampshire v Sussex (20–23 July) ===
Hampshire (19.5pts) beat Sussex (6pts) by 35 runs

Hampshire's veteran wicketkeeper Nic Pothas made his way to a four-hour 135, his twelfth first-class century, after Jason Lewry, James Kirtley and Rana Naved-ul-Hasan had reduced Hampshire to 102 for 6 in the middle of the afternoon session on the first day. Pothas was well supported by Zimbabwean Sean Ervine, who made 69, and the pair added 191 in three hours before Naved-ul-Hasan broke through with the last ball of the day, having Ervine caught by Ian Ward. Hampshire slumped to 309 on the morning of day two, and solid contributions from the entire batting order – bar number three Michael Yardy who made a duck – lifted Sussex to a slender seven-run lead amid Ervine's swing bowling, which yielded five wickets for 73. However, Mushtaq Ahmed got the early breakthrough for Sussex, and James Kirtley ripped out two quick wickets as Hampshire folded to 22 for 3 overnight.

Kirtley and Naved-ul-Hasan continued to pile on the pressure on the third morning, as they eked out two catches and reduced Hampshire to 28 for 5, a lead of 21. However, once again, the all-rounders fought back. Australian Shane Watson made 82, while Pothas added 74, and number 11 Chris Tremlett made an unbeaten 44 to ensure that Hampshire set a competitive target of 271, despite Kirtley's five for 67. Ian Ward made 60 and Murray Goodwin an unbeaten 51 as Sussex cruised to 167 for 3 after only 38 overs on day three, needing 104 more to win on the fourth day.

Goodwin added 20 more on the final morning before Dimitri Mascarenhas snared him out, but he had stood tall in Mascarenhas' early spell on the morning of day 4, which had yielded three wickets for two runs. Goodwin was eventually caught by Greg Lamb, but Sussex still needed only 55 for the last three wickets – however, Sean Ervine added the wickets of Pakistanis Rana and Ahmed to his tally to help bowl Sussex out for 235. Thus, Hampshire took the victory in a closely contested game, although they were later deducted half a point for a slow over rate. (Cricinfo scorecard)

=== Surrey v Sussex (24 July) ===
Sussex (4pts) beat Surrey (0pts) by 48 runs

An interesting match at Guildford was shortened to 22 overs a side due to rain. However, the scores were similar to what could have been in a 45-over game, as Sussex Sharks amassed 219 for 9 – Murray Goodwin top-scoring with 44, while Luke Wright plundered three sixes in a 14-ball 35. The Surrey bowlers all got wickets – except for Ian Salisbury – but also conceded more than seven runs an over. A Surrey Lions side including three debutants – Stewart Walters, Rory Hamilton-Brown and Jake Dernbach – crumbled despite the efforts of Mark Ramprakash who made 63, as they were all out for 171. (Cricinfo scorecard)

=== Sussex v Gloucestershire (26–29 July) ===
Sussex (7pts) drew with Gloucestershire (7pts)

Rain damaged both the first and the second day at The County Ground, Hove, and only 93 overs were possible in two days. Yet, 18 wickets fell on those two days, 14 of which on the second day. Sussex resumed play on the second day with an overnight score of 97 for 4, and immediately lost two wickets to swing bowler Jon Lewis, who ended with four for 62. However, a quick blast of four fours, one six and one single from Jason Lewry lifted Sussex to 191 all out. The Gloucestershire reply never got off the mark, as seven batsmen were out in single figures and the highest partnership was 33. Rana Naved-ul-Hasan got good output with the ball, however, taking four for 26 as Gloucestershire ended on 142.

Despite early breakthroughs from Lewis and Steve Kirby Sussex fought back, as Michael Yardy, Murray Goodwin and Chris Adams all passed 40 to see Sussex to 200 for 4 at stumps on day three. Lewis took four wickets on the fourth morning to bowl Sussex out for 267, Yardy completing his century before he was caught off Ian Fisher, setting up a potentially exciting finish with 317 required off 74 overs. Gloucestershire never attempted the chase, however, and Sussex failed to get them out, despite 19 overs of spin from Mushtaq Ahmed which yielded three wickets for 25. (Cricinfo scorecard)

=== Sussex v Somerset (1 August) ===
Sussex (4pts) beat Somerset (0pts) by 11 runs

Richard Montgomerie and Matt Prior opened the batting with a partnership of 13, and Murray Goodwin added a further 97 with Montgomerie for the third wicket, as Sussex Sharks made 266 for 3 in their 45 overs. Montgomerie's 132 not out was his highest List A score Somerset Sabres lost wickets regularly, and despite dispatching Mushtaq Ahmed for 70 in 9 overs, they finished on 255 for 9 – Michael Yardy taking four for 26, while Ian Blackwell top-scored for Somerset with 57. (Cricinfo scorecard)

=== Sussex v Surrey (3–5 August) ===
Sussex (21pts) beat Surrey (4pts) by five wickets

Surrey won the toss at Hove against Sussex, and chose to bat – and lost the wickets of both their openers in the first 20 minutes to fall to seven for two. Mark Ramprakash, Rikki Clarke and Jonathan Batty steadied the ship, and Surrey made their way to 157 for 3, only for all-rounder Robin Martin-Jenkins to snare a couple of wickets and incite a collapse to 187 for 8. Azhar Mahmood's quickfire 57 not out lifted them to 248, but Sussex posted 67 for the first wicket, and despite by four wickets from Azhar which sent the hosts to 180 for 6, Martin-Jenkins made 88 from number eight to help Sussex to 378 and a lead of 130.

Openers Scott Newman and Richard Clinton made up for their first-innings failure and batted 22 overs until stumps on day two without giving away their wickets, but on the third morning James Kirtley got the vital breakthrough, having Clinton caught for 12 off 79 balls. Rikki Clarke's 75 led Surrey to set a target, at least, as the Pakistanis dominated – Naved-ul-Hasan got four for 70 and Mushtaq Ahmed three for 96. Surrey had some Pakistanis of their own, as Azhar Mahmood and Mohammad Akram took two and one wicket respectively, and Sussex scrambled to 33 for 4 at tea on day 3, chasing a meagre 125 to win. After tea, however, Michael Yardy and Matt Prior attacked Nayan Doshi with fury – Prior finishing with 66 not out off just 48 balls – as Sussex eased to the target with five wickets to spare, losing Yardy for 35 but still holding out for the win. (Cricinfo scorecard)

=== Sussex v Leicestershire (7 August) ===
Leicestershire (4pts) beat Sussex (0pts) by six wickets

Leicestershire Foxes eked out a last-ball victory over Sussex Sharks to tighten up the title battle in Division Two of the National League. Batting first, Sussex were tied down by Ottis Gibson, as the Barbadian seamer took four for 37 with three maidens in his nine overs. Chris Adams top-scored with 78, while Rana Naved-ul-Hasan blasted 45 off just 31 balls to propel Sussex to a competitive 223 for 8. Sussex fast bowler James Kirtley then bowled a maiden to begin Leicestershire's innings, and had Tom New caught for an eight-ball duck later. However, Darren Maddy and HD Ackerman added 185 for the second wicket, and despite wickets tumbling around him, Ackerman finished on an unbeaten 114, hitting the winning four off the last ball. (Cricinfo scorecard)

=== Gloucestershire v Sussex (10–13 August) ===
Sussex (21pts) beat Gloucestershire (4pts) by 226 runs

Sussex recorded a comfortable win at Bristol against Gloucestershire, to escape further from the relegation zone – in a match completely dominated by Sussex' overseas bowlers. Murray Goodwin, Chris Adams and Matt Prior all made quick half-centuries, to propel Sussex to 365, while the Gloucestershire spinners shared seven wickets – Malinga Bandara taking four for 64 and Ian Fisher three for 93. Indeed, spinners were to take the brunt of the bowling, as Gloucestershire had only gone in with two specialist seamers – and one of them, Steve Kirby, broke down with an injury in his fifth over of the day.

Gloucestershire resumed the second day on 28 for 1, and players from the Indian subcontinent were to dominate the day's proceedings, as they took all of the thirteen wickets. Sussex' Pakistani spinner Mushtaq Ahmed took six for 65, while Rana Naved-ul-Hasan added three to his overnight tally of one to end with four for 53. No Gloucestershire batsman passed 50, as they trailed by 141 on first innings. Sussex took on seven overs from the seamers, before Michael Ball and Bandara started another marathon spell. The openers survived to pair up for 67, but then Bandara took a burst of wickets, finishing the day with four for 58 as Sussex closed the second day's play on 128 for 4.

On the third day, Prior and Michael Yardy made a fifth wicket-partnership worth 141 runs, and Sussex could declare with a lead of 405 runs, after Bandara was taken for runs to end with the expensive innings bowling analysis of 26–3–112–4. Again, Gloucestershire subsided to the Pakistani bowlers, but for once an English-born bowler got his name up on Gloucestershire's scorecard – Alex Gidman was lbw to James Kirtley for 7. Rana took five and Mushtaq three as Gloucestershire collapsed to 179, Ramnaresh Sarwan making 117 of those. (Cricinfo scorecard)

=== Derbyshire v Sussex (14 August) ===
Derbyshire (4pts) beat Sussex (0pts) by three runs

Michael di Venuto made 129 not out, his third one-day century this season, to lift Derbyshire Phantoms to a final score of 232 for 3, which would turn out to be just enough to win the game. Sussex Sharks were looking to win and open a gap at the top of the league, and with ten runs needed with three wickets in hand and at least two overs remaining, it looked like they would coast to victory. However, Rana Naved-ul-Hasan holed out a catch to Jon Moss, Mushtaq Ahmed could add no run from three balls, and in the end, James Kirtley was bowled by Moss on the last ball, with Kirtley needing to hit a boundary to win the game. (Cricinfo scorecard)

=== Middlesex v Sussex (16–17 August) ===
Sussex (22pts) beat Middlesex (3pts) by an innings and 232 runs

Sussex enjoyed their highest victory all season by defeating Middlesex at Lord's, after Rana Naved-ul-Hasan came in at eight to slash a first class best 139. His seventh-wicket partnership with Michael Yardy was worth 228 runs in just two and a half hours, after the first six wickets had been lost for 199 runs. With Mark Davis scoring a quickfire 50 as well, Sussex went to stumps on day one with the score 522 for 9 – with the run rate at just over five an over. Middlesex' Stuart Clark got Davis out with the fourth ball of the morning, but from then on everything went downhill. Once again, just like against Gloucestershire the previous week, Rana and Mushtaq Ahmed went berserk on the opposing batting line-ups, as Rana removed the top three batsmen and Mushtaq the next three as Middlesex crashed to 87 for 6. Then, after a brief period of calm where Ben Scott and Chris Peploe added 23 runs, Robin Martin-Jenkins broke through and Middlesex lost three wickets for three runs. Middlesex finished their first innings on 128 – Martin-Jenkins taking the last wicket to end with four for 31 – and were forced to follow on, trailing by 394 runs on first innings.

Ed Smith and Ben Hutton forged Middlesex' biggest partnership of the match so far, with 45 runs, before the wheels fell off once again. Mushtaq took three wickets in an over, and Rana Naved-ul-Hasan removed four batsmen for ducks in another frantic over, as Middlesex imploded from 45 for 0 to 48 for 7. Smith tried to force Sussex to bat again at least, batting for three hours to make 69, but Mushtaq got another three wickets to end with six for 44, and Middlesex collapsed to a total of 162. Pakistani bowlers took a total of 16 wickets for Sussex – in the last Championship game they had taken 18. (Cricinfo scorecard)

=== Leicestershire v Sussex (21 August) ===
Leicestershire (4pts) beat Sussex (0pts) by five wickets

Leicestershire Foxes recorded their second win over Sussex Sharks in two weeks to close the gap at the top of Division Two of the National League to two points. Having been put in the field by the Sussex captain Chris Adams, Leicestershire grabbed the first four wickets for 44 runs, and despite a 72-run fifth-wicket partnership between Michael Yardy and Carl Hopkinson, Sussex could only muster 186 all out – Dinesh Mongia taking the last two wickets, while conceding 17 from two overs. Mongia also contributed with the bat – after the Sussex bowlers had made things tricky for Leicestershire's top order, reducing them to 27 for 2 and then 103 for 5, Mongia remained at the crease to make 92 at just under a run a ball to see Leicestershire past the target with seven balls to spare. (Cricinfo scorecard)

=== Warwickshire v Sussex (23 August) ===
Sussex (4pts) beat Warwickshire (0pts) by five wickets

Sussex Sharks opened up a four-point gap after a spell of left-arm spin bowling from Michael Yardy yielded the last six wickets of Warwickshire Bears' innings for 27 runs, the best bowling figures in Division Two of the National League all season. Earlier, Sussex pacer Rana Naved-ul-Hasan had made inroads with three wickets for 25, and it was only the 73-run partnership between Alex Loudon and Michael Powell that got Warwickshire past 100. Yardy's six-for left Warwickshire all out for 169, however, and in the chase Sussex were troubled by Makhaya Ntini's fast bowling as both opening batsmen were removed and Sussex crumbled to 16 for 2. However, Zimbabwean Murray Goodwin scored a solid, two-hour 86 not out, and guided the team to the target, putting on 82 with Robin Martin-Jenkins after spinner Alex Loudon had taken two wickets to set Sussex back to 91 for 5. (Cricinfo scorecard)

=== Warwickshire v Sussex (25–28 August) ===
Warwickshire (22pts) beat Sussex (8pts) by 101 runs

For once, Rana Naved-ul-Hasan went wicketless on the first day, and thus Sussex lost the match and the Championship lead at Edgbaston. Warwickshire's Jonathan Trott, who had made a career best 152 two weeks previously, now notched up his third first class century of the season as he carried his team to 329 for 7 on the first day. Trott continued on the second, and was eventually last out, having shattered his previous highest score and gone on to make 210 before he was bowled by Rana. Warwickshire were thus all out for 475, Mushtaq Ahmed and James Kirtley taking three wickets each, and Warwickshire got a good start with the ball as Makhaya Ntini and Dougie Brown removed an opener each. However, Michael Yardy, Murray Goodwin and Chris Adams all made solid contributions as Sussex moved to 244 for 3 at stumps on day two.

The third day saw a total of sixteen wickets fall, as Sussex came back to dismiss Warwickshire for a low score after giving up a 47-run lead on first innings. Goodwin made 150, his fourth century of the season, as Sussex scored 428, while most of the Warwickshire bowlers got wickets but conceded plenty of runs in the process. Then, Rana set out to repair his poor first innings effort, taking four wickets in 15 overs as Warwickshire could only muster 180 – and that was mostly thanks to a 50-run partnership between Trevor Frost and Brown. Sussex needed 228 to win, but collapsed. Wickets were shared out among the entire Warwickshire team, James Anyon getting the most with four for 33, and Makhaya Ntini, Neil Carter and Alex Loudon also got two each, to see Sussex all out for 126. (Cricinfo scorecard)

=== Sussex v Scotland (30 August) ===
Sussex (4pts) beat Scotland (0pts) by seven wickets

Rana Naved-ul-Hasan's pace bowling was too much to handle for the Scottish Saltires, as they whimpered to 132 all out despite Jonathan Beukes making 51. None of the other batsmen passed 20, as Rana took five for 30 from his nine overs, while James Kirtley bowled tightly to end with a bowling analysis of 8.5–3–8–2. Sussex Sharks strolled to the target in just over half the allotted time, Matt Prior smashing thirteen fours and one six in a fifty-ball 69, while Sean Weeraratna took two for 20 for the Scots. (Cricinfo scorecard)

=== Sussex v Surrey (31 August) ===
Sussex (4pts) beat Surrey (0pts) by two wickets

Mushtaq Ahmed sealed a last-ball victory for Sussex Sharks in a closely fought match at The County Ground, Hove, against mid-table languishers Surrey Lions. The visitors had opted to bat first, and lost three early wickets for 40 runs, but a calm rearguard from Mark Ramprakash set the stage for some fours from Azhar Mahmood near the end. Surrey finished on 230 for 6, and got a good start when Azhar dismissed Robin Montgomerie for 0. A quick 42 from Matt Prior, however, gave Sussex hope of chasing the target, and despite wickets falling regularly Sussex kept the required rate below seven an over, with captain Chris Adams keeping the innings together with his unbeaten 110. Mushtaq eventually faced the final ball of the match, and he hit it to the boundary, which gave Sussex the win and extended their Division Two lead to ten points. (Cricinfo scorecard)

=== Sussex v Glamorgan (7–8 September) ===
Sussex (20pts) beat Glamorgan (5pts) by nine wickets

David Hemp made 71 as Glamorgan made their way to a relatively competitive total of 255 in 77.3 overs on the first day, while Mushtaq Ahmed took five for 89 and James Kirtley four for 42 in response. When Glamorgan bowled, Alex Wharf and Dean Cosker took a wicket each, as Sussex worked their way to 70 for 2, with the match finely poised at the end of the first day. However, nineteen wickets tumbled on the second day, as Sussex took the victory one would expect from the relative table positions of the two sides. They lost Ian Ward for 48 early on in the day, but fifties from Murray Goodwin and Chris Adams propelled them to a total of 317, a lead of 62. Rana Naved-ul-Hasan then made up for his wicketless first innings effort by having two men caught behind and one bowled, as Glamorgan crashed to 22 for 3, only to see a small rebuilding effort. But a good bowling effort from Mushtaq and Rana saw Glamorgan crash from 73 for 4 to 78 for 9 as four batsmen were out for ducks. Opener David Cherry was last out, for 39, as Glamorgan were bowled out for 96 in just 28 overs – Rana taking five for 41 and Mushtaq five for 29. Sussex chased 35 to win with ease, losing only Ward in a nine-wicket victory. (Cricinfo scorecard)

=== Kent v Sussex (18 September) ===
Sussex (4pts) beat Kent (0pts) by 61 runs

Sussex Sharks were put in to bat at St Lawrence Ground, and although they lost nine wickets, they still managed 230 runs in their 45 overs. Chris Adams and Robin Montgomerie put on 111 for the second wicket after Matt Prior was caught behind for 4, and although five wickets fell for 42 in a period which saw them to 209 for 8, Carl Hopkinson and Mushtaq Ahmed added 21 for the ninth wicket. Kent Spitfires' innings started with losing Neil Dexter for a five-ball duck, bowled by James Kirtley, and Robin Martin-Jenkins had three men caught as Kent lost their first five wickets for 48. Despite 51 from Michael Carberry Kent never got anywhere near the target, Kirtley taking the final wickets as Kent finished on 169. (Cricinfo scorecard)

=== Sussex v Kent (21–23 September) ===
Sussex (20pts) beat Kent (5pts) by eight wickets

Sussex' three main bowlers won them the game at Hove against Kent – James Kirtley took seven for 103, Rana Naved-ul-Hasan six for 124, and Mushtaq Ahmed five for 173 in the match, as Sussex took an eight-wicket victory. Sussex took three wickets in the first 45 minutes, courtesy of Kirtley and Rana, and for only 28 runs in reply. Matthew Walker and Darren Stevens added 52 together for the fourth wicket, but it was the half-centuries from Min Patel and Niall O'Brien – his second in successive matches – that carried Kent past 200. They finished on 257, with Kirtley and Naved-ul-Hasan taking four wickets each, while Mushtaq had to be content with two for 81 from nearly 28 overs. Sussex, however, ground out 47 for 2 wickets in the 23 remaining overs, the Kent spinners Patel and Jamie Tredwell keeping them from scoring.

On the second day, Sussex accelerated, but after five wickets from Patel they were 192 for 8, still trailing by 65. However, Mushtaq forged partnerships of 86 and 74 with Luke Wright and James Kirtley respectively, hitting an unbeaten 90 himself as Sussex ended on 348. Kent trailed by 89, and in the second innings Rob Key hit eleven fours in a two-hour 84, but he was dismissed by Robin Martin-Jenkins just before the close of the second day's play to leave Kent with a lead of 53 with seven wickets in hand. Kirtley, Rana and Mushtaq removed the last seven wickets for 94 runs on day three, leaving Sussex 148 to chase, which they did inside two hours thanks to half-centuries from Carl Hopkinson and Michael Yardy. (Cricinfo scorecard)

=== Sussex v Yorkshire (25 September) ===
Sussex (4pts) beat Yorkshire (0pts) by eight wickets

Sussex Sharks sealed the National League Division Two title by fielding first and bowling Yorkshire Phoenix out for 99. Only wicket-keeper Simon Guy passed 20, as Yorkshire fell in two periods – first to 37 for 5 thanks to three wickets from Luke Wright, and then, after Guy, Anthony McGrath and Mark Cleary had taken them to 90 for 6, they lost their last four men for nine runs. Sussex captain Chris Adams took his time in the reply, using 83 balls to hit 49 as Sussex' batsmen rode home to an eight-wicket victory.
