= Dick Richards (cricketer) =

English cricketer

Personal information
- Full name: Dick Stanley Richards
- Born: 10 September 1908; Bognor, Sussex, England
- Died: 13 November 1995 (aged 87); Worthing, Sussex, England
- Batting: Right-handed
- Bowling: Slow left-arm orthodox
- Relatives: Jim Parks Sr. (brother-in-law); Henry Parks (brother-in-law); Jim Parks Jr. (nephew); Bobby Parks (great-nephew)

Domestic team information
- Years: Team
- 1927–1935: Sussex

Umpiring information
- FC umpired: 4 (1932–1934)

Career statistics
Competition	First-class
Matches	18
Runs scored	220
Batting average	10.00
100s/50s	0/0
Top score	23
Balls bowled	378
Wickets	1
Bowling average	205.00
5 wickets in innings	0
10 wickets in match	0
Best bowling	1/8
Catches/stumpings	7/–
- Source: Cricinfo, 28 July 2012

Dick Stanley Richards (10 September 1908 – 13 November 1995) was an English cricketer. He was a right-handed batsman who bowled slow left-arm orthodox. He was born at Bognor, Sussex.

Richards made his first-class debut for Sussex against Worcestershire in the 1927 County Championship at the County Ground, Hove. He made seventeen further first-class appearances for the county, the last of which came against Surrey in the 1935 County Championship at The Saffrons, Eastbourne. In his eighteen first-class appearances for the county, he scored 220 runs at an average of 10.00, with a high score of 23. With the ball, he bowled a total of 63 overs, but took just a single wicket, that of Surrey's Stan Squires, in what was Richards' final first-class appearance.

Richards stood as an umpire in four first-class matches from 1932 to 1934. He also stood in 55 Minor Counties Championship matches from 1953 to 1964.

He died at Worthing, Sussex, on 13 November 1995. His brother-in-law, Jim Parks, played Test cricket for England, while Henry Parks, also his brother-in-law, played first-class cricket, as did his great-nephew, Bobby Parks. His nephew, Jim Parks Jr., also played Test cricket for England.
