= Bobby Parks (cricketer) =

English cricketer

Personal information
- Full name: Robert James Parks
- Born: 15 June 1959 (age 67); Cuckfield, Sussex, England
- Batting: Right-handed
- Role: Wicket-keeper
- Relatives: Jim Parks junior (father); Jim Parks senior (grandfather); Dick Richards (great-uncle)

Domestic team information
- Years: Team
- 1980–1992: Hampshire
- 1990: Marylebone Cricket Club
- 1993: Kent

Career statistics
Competition	First-class	List A
Matches	256	251
Runs scored	3,957	972
Batting average	19.58	16.20
100s/50s	0/14	0/0
Top score	89	38*
Catches/stumpings	642/72	266/47
- Source: Cricinfo, 30 September 2018

Robert James Parks (born 15 June 1959) is a former English first-class cricketer who played predominantly for as a wicket-keeper for Hampshire. In a playing career for Hampshire which spanned from 1980 to 1992, Parks took exactly 700 dismissals in first-class cricket, which as of 2024 makes him the most successful wicket-keeper in Hampshire's history. He later briefly played for Kent in 1993, before holding numerous coaching roles at Hampshire.

== Playing career ==
The son of the England Test cricketer Jim Parks junior, he was born in June 1959 at Cuckfield, Sussex. His grandfather, Jim Parks senior, was also a Test cricketer. When his father was playing for Sussex, Parks was educated at Eastbourne Grammar School, but was later educated at Taunton School when his father played for Somerset later in his career. He then proceeded to study at the Southampton Institute of Technology. After briefly playing for the Somerset Second XI, he joined Hampshire in 1976, where he would spend the next four years as an understudy to regular wicket-keeper Bob Stephenson. Parks made his debut for the Hampshire first team against Sussex at Southampton in the 1980 County Championship. He featured regularly for Hampshire in the closing weeks of the 1980 season as Stephenson stepped down from his wicket-keeping duties, making six further appearances in the County Championship, in addition to playing five List A one-day matches in the 1980 John Player League. Following Stephenson's retirement at the end of the 1980 season, Parks became Hampshire's first choice wicket-keeper.

Parks ended his first full season as Hampshire first choice keeper with 52 dismissals in first-class matches, Against Derbyshire that season, he took ten catches in a match, which at the time was a Hampshire record. He kept with success for Hampshire throughout the early to mid-1980s, taking 265 dismissals between the 1981 and 1984 seasons. He toured Zimbabwe with an English Counties XI in the spring of 1985, making two first-class and five one-day appearances against the Zimbabwean national team. During the 1985 English season, in which Hampshire finished second in the County Championship, Parks took 62 dismissals in first-class cricket. He followed that up in 1986 with 81, with this becoming his most successful season, with him also helping Hampshire to win the 1986 John Player Special League. In the same season, Parks was one of three substitute wicket-keepers used by England's in the 1st Test match of their series against New Zealand; following an injury to Bruce French, he was replaced for two overs by Bill Athey, before the retired Bob Taylor, who was at the ground on behalf of match sponsors Cornhill Insurance, deputised. The following day, Parks was summoned from Southampton to replace Taylor, before French resumed his wicket-keeping duties on the fourth day of the match. Parks had further success with Hampshire, winning the 1988 Benson & Hedges Cup, and claimed his 600th first-class dismissal in the 1989 County Championship when he caught Northamptonshire's Geoff Cook off the bowling of Paul-Jan Bakker.

He was displaced in the Hampshire team in 1990 by fellow wicket-keeper Adrian Aymes, who was considered to have greater batting ability than Parks. Having played only three one-day matches in 1991, Parks returned to Hampshire's first-class team in 1992 when he played against Oxford University in May, before a knee injury to Aymes in June enabled him to return to the team and play a further five County Championship matches. Prior to these, Parks had the second-highest number of first-class dismissals for a Hampshire wicket-keeper, behind Neil McCorkell's 688; following these matches, he surpassed McCorkell's record with 700 dismissals (630 catches and 70 stumpings). As of 2026, he remains Hampshire's most successful wicket-keeper. In addition to playing six first-class matches in 1992, Parks also made six one-day appearances, the last of which came in the final of the 1992 Benson & Hedges Cup against Kent at Lord's, which Hampshire won by 41 runs. In September of that season, Hampshire announced their intention to release Parks at the end of the season. In 253 first-class matches for Hampshire, Parks scored 3,936 runs at an average of 19.68, although never scored a century. In one-day cricket, he made 244 appearances, taking 260 catches and making 43 stumpings; with the bat, he scored 959 runs at an average of 16.53, but never passed fifty.

In July 1993, he played briefly for Kent as cover for the injured Steve Marsh, making two appearances at Maidstone against Essex, consisting of a first-class appearance in the County Championship and playing in a one-day match in the Axa Equity & Law League. Following the end of his playing career, Parks trained to become an accountant in the air freight industry.

== Coaching career ==
Parks coached the France national cricket team in 1998. Parks returned to Hampshire in 2002 on a freelance basis to coach wicket-keepers between the ages of 10 and 19, before expanding this role to work with Hampshire's then-incumbent wicket-keeper Nic Pothas. He then spent four years in charge of Hampshire's emerging players' programme, before spending another four years as Hampshire's academy director. He stepped down from as academy director in 2015 and was succeeded by Second XI coach Charlie Freeston. Parks was the general manager of the Southern Vipers women's team until April 2018, when he retired and handed the role to Charlotte Edwards.
