= Ted Bowley =

English cricketer

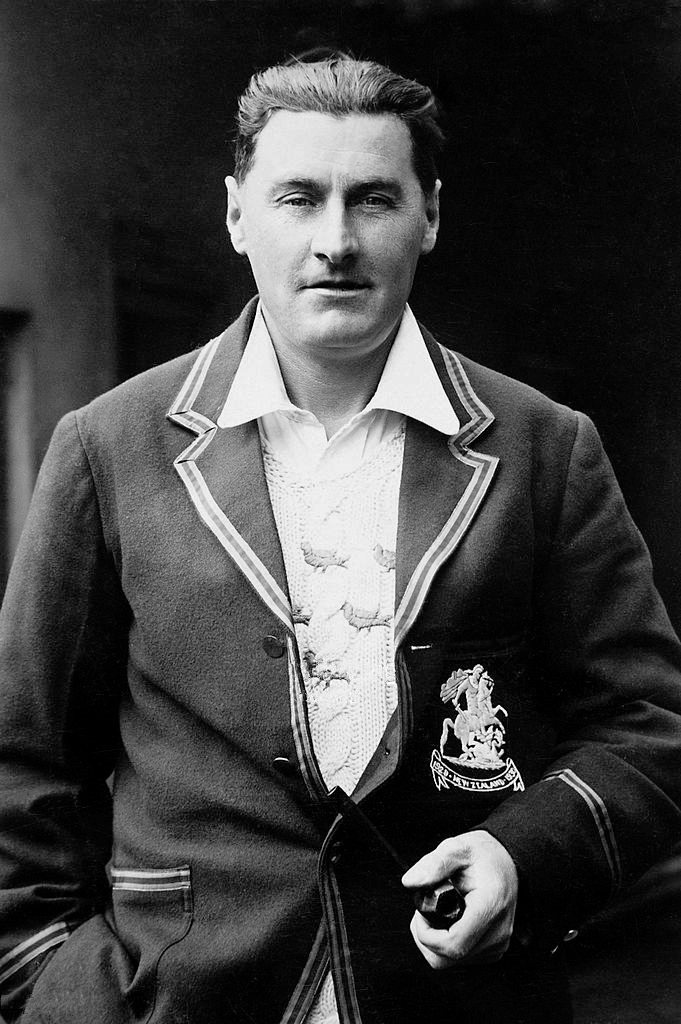
- Bowley wearing his blazer from the 1930 tour of New Zealand

Personal information
- Born: 6 June 1890; Leatherhead, Surrey, England
- Died: 9 July 1974 (aged 84); Winchester, Hampshire, England
- Batting: Right-handed
- Bowling: Legbreak

International information
- National side: England
- Test debut: 13 July 1929 v South Africa
- Last Test: 21 February 1930 v New Zealand

Career statistics
Competition	Test	First-class
Matches	5	510
Runs scored	252	28,378
Batting average	36.00	34.94
100s/50s	1/0	52/147
Top score	109	283
Balls bowled	252	40,817
Wickets	0	741
Bowling average	–	25.98
5 wickets in innings	–	28
10 wickets in match	–	2
Best bowling	–	9/114
Catches/stumpings	2/–	373/–
- Source: CricInfo, 24 October 2021

Edward Henry Bowley (6 June 1890 – 9 July 1974) was an English first-class cricketer who played for Sussex County Cricket Club and the England cricket team.

A forceful opening batsman, Bowley played just one season of regular first-class cricket before the First World War and was 30 when he resumed his cricket career in 1920. For the next 14 seasons he was a reliable run-getter, and for three seasons from 1927 to 1929, he was among the heaviest scorers in England. At 39, he was called up for two Test matches against South Africa in 1929, and the following winter he toured New Zealand and Australia with Harold Gilligan's Marylebone Cricket Club (MCC) team, playing in three of the four Test matches against New Zealand. He scored 109 at Auckland.

Bowley shared in several big partnerships for Sussex, two of them still county records. In 1921, he put on 385 for the second wicket with Maurice Tate against Northamptonshire at Northampton. Against Gloucestershire at Hove in 1929, he hit an undefeated 280 in a day and shared a first-wicket partnership of 368 with Jim Parks senior. He beat that Sussex record himself four years later when, with John Langridge, he put on 490 runs. This is the third-highest first-wicket partnership in England, the fourth-highest of all time and the eighth-highest partnership for any wicket in first-class cricket. In this partnership, against Middlesex at Hove, Bowley made his highest score, 283.

Bowley was also a useful leg-spin bowler, regularly taking around 50 wickets a season. In 1928, he took 90 wickets as well as scoring 2,359 runs. He was a Wisden Cricketer of the Year in 1930.
