= Double (cricket) =

A cricketer is said to achieve the double if he scores a thousand or more runs and also takes a hundred or more wickets in first-class matches during the course of a single season.

The feat is extremely rare outside England because of the smaller number of first-class matches played in most other countries; it has also become very uncommon in England in recent decades because of the reduction in the first-class programme in favour of more List A matches, last being achieved by Franklyn Stephenson in 1988.

Wilfred Rhodes performed the double more often than anyone else, 16 times. George Hirst achieved the feat on 14 occasions, including a unique "double double" in 1906 of 2,385 runs and 208 wickets, and Jim Parks senior managed the unique double of 3,000 runs and 100 wickets in 1937. Maurice Tate, who scored 1,193 runs and took 116 wickets during the MCC's tour of India and Ceylon in 1926–27, is the only cricketer to have achieved the feat outside England.

The "wicketkeeper's double", of one thousand runs and one hundred dismissals in a season, has only ever been achieved by two players; Les Ames (on three occasions), and John Murray.

== See also ==
- All-rounder

== Sources ==
- Wisden Cricketers' Almanack, 2007 edition, ISBN 978-1-905625-02-4, p327.
