= Mark Davis (South African cricketer) =

South African cricketer

Personal information
- Full name: Mark Jeffrey Gronow Davis
- Born: 10 October 1971 (age 55); Port Elizabeth, South Africa
- Batting: Right-handed
- Role: Bowler

Domestic team information
- Years: Team
- 1990/91–1996/97: Northern Transvaal
- 1997/98–1999/00: Northerns
- 2001–2005: Sussex

Career statistics
Competition	FC	LA	T20
Matches	127	160	17
Runs scored	2,941	946	78
Batting average	18.73	17.20	19.60
100s/50s	2/8	0/0	0/0
Top score	168	37	20*
Balls bowled	18,475	7,294	276
Wickets	232	142	13
Bowling average	36.06	37.43	26.38
5 wickets in innings	5	0	0
10 wickets in match	1	0	0
Best bowling	8/37	4/14	3/13
Catches/stumpings	68/–	34/–	5/–
- Source: CricketArchive, 2 July 2015

Mark Jeffrey Gronow Davis (born 10 October 1971) is a South African former cricketer active from 1990 to 2005. He was club coach of Sussex until he left by mutual agreement in October 2017. During his playing career, he played domestic cricket for Northern Transvaal (later known as Northerns), MCC, and Sussex, as well as making appearances for South Africa A and South Africa U-24s.

== Playing career ==
Davis appeared in 127 first-class matches as a righthanded batsman who bowled off breaks. He scored 2,941 runs with a highest score of 168 and took 232 wickets with a best performance of eight for 37. He was the captain of Northerns cricket team, before moving to England for the 2001 season, as Davis held a British passport. During a match against Nottinghamshire, he almost became the first person in English first-class cricket history to concede a five run penalty under Law 42 of the Laws of cricket (fair and unfair play); his second warning for repeatedly running on the wicket caused the single he scored to be deducted from the score. In 2002, Davis and Robin Martin-Jenkins scored a record eighth-wicket partnership for Sussex of 291; as of 2015, this is still the highest eighth-wicket partnership for Sussex. Davis' innings of 111 in the partnership was his maiden first-class century. He was part of the Sussex team that won the 2003 County Championship, Sussex's first County Championship win, and scored his highest first-class score of 168 in a 2003 match against Middlesex.

== Coaching career ==
Davis announced his retirement from cricket in 2005, and was then announced as a Sussex club coach, replacing Peter Moores. He took control of the Second Team, and Mark Robinson, Sussex Professional Cricket Manager, said that "His experience both within the professional game as a player and most recently by running his own coaching academy in South Africa will make him a vital member of the coaching team." In 2009, he gained his Level 4 Coaching Certificate, making him only one of three Sussex coaches with the qualification. In 2011, he had a Testimonial Year, to celebrate 10 years of service to Sussex CCC. In 2012, Davis swapped roles with Carl Hopkinson, making him an assistant to manager Mark Robinson. In 2013, Davis was a contender to become Sri Lankan head coach, although Marvan Atapattu was eventually awarded the job. He has held the role of Director of Cricket at Brighton College since 2020 and was formerly Master in Charge of Cricket at Harrow School.
