= Jim Parks (cricketer, born 1931) =

English cricketer (1931–2022)

Personal information
- Full name: James Michael Parks
- Born: 21 October 1931; Haywards Heath, Sussex, England
- Died: 31 May 2022 (aged 90); Worthing, West Sussex, England
- Batting: Right-handed
- Bowling: Right arm leg break
- Role: Wicket-keeper
- Relatives: Jim Parks Sr. (father); Bobby Parks (son)

International information
- National side: England
- Test debut (cap 375): 22 July 1954 v Pakistan
- Last Test: 5 March 1968 v West Indies

Domestic team information
- Years: Team
- 1949–1972: Sussex
- 1973–1976: Somerset

Career statistics
Competition	Test	FC	LA
Matches	46	739	132
Runs scored	1,962	36,673	2,832
Batting average	32.16	34.76	26.22
100s/50s	2/9	51/213	1/13
Top score	108*	205*	102*
Balls bowled	54	3,837	–
Wickets	1	51	–
Bowling average	51.00	43.82	–
5 wickets in innings	0	0	–
10 wickets in match	0	0	–
Best bowling	1/43	3/23	–
Catches/stumpings	103/11	1,087/94	113/7
- Source: CricInfo, 1 October 2009

James Michael Parks (21 October 1931 – 31 May 2022) was an English cricketer. He played in forty-six Tests for England, between 1954 and 1968. In those Tests, Parks scored 1,962 runs with a personal best of 108 not out, and took 103 catches and made 11 stumpings.

== Early life ==
Parks was born in Haywards Heath on 21 October 1931. His father, Jim Sr., was a prolific all-rounder for Sussex and played once for England in 1937, while his uncle, Harry, played over 400 games for Sussex. Parks attended Hove County Grammar School for Boys.

== Career ==
Parks was an attacking batsman, athletic fieldsman and a spin bowler who made his first-class debut for Sussex in 1949. By 1958, and with Sussex struggling for a reliable stopper, Parks made a successful switch to wicketkeeping.

Parks describes the unusual circumstances in which he first began keeping wicket:

It came about by accident. I didn't keep wicket at the start of my career. I was a specialist batsman. A couple of years after that, Sussex were playing against Essex in a Championship game at Chelmsford, when our wicketkeeper, Rupert Webb got injured. There we were in the Chelmsford dressing room before the start of play and we suddenly realised we've got no wicketkeeper. Robin Marlar, the Sussex captain, looked at me and said "You're doing it". I didn't have any kit and so had to borrow Essex keeper Brian Taylor's gloves.

Prior to that, in 1954, Parks had been picked, purely as a batsman, for one Test against Pakistan at the age of 22. He made little impact and had to wait until early in 1960 to score an unbeaten century, batting at number seven, to help England gain a draw and clinch the series whilst touring the West Indies. He then remained England's first choice wicket-keeper through to the mid-1960s. In the 1965–66 Ashes series he made 290 runs (48.33) and hit his fair share of boundaries, but a missed stumping off Peter Burge in the Second Test cost England a chance of regaining the urn.

The cricket writer Colin Bateman commented, "Parks was a gifted batsman and a most effective wicketkeeper". Bateman added "although he never suggested he was in the same class as Godfrey Evans before him or Alan Knott after, Parks had safe hands and was a good stopper".

Parks captained Sussex from 1967 to 1968, before he was succeeded by Mike Griffith. He left Sussex following the 1972 season, and joined Somerset on a three-year contract. He retired from first-class cricket in 1976. In 739 first-class matches, he scored 36,673 runs at an average of 34.76, with 51 hundreds and 213 fifties. He took 1,087 catches and made 92 stumpings. He also took 51 wickets, with a personal best of 3 for 23.

== Later life ==
After retiring from cricket, Parks was employed by Whitbread. He subsequently went back to Sussex to be its marketing manager and went on to serve two terms as club president starting in 2013. He also acted as manager of the Old England cricket team for several years. From August 2021 until his death, Parks was the oldest surviving male England Test cricketer.

== Personal life and death ==
Parks was married to Jenny (née Rogers) from 1973 until his death. His previous marriages, to Irene Young and then Ann Wembridge, both ended in divorce. He had three children with Irene, Andrew (d. 2004), Bobby, who played county cricket for both Hampshire and Kent, and Louise.

Parks died on the morning of 31 May 2022 at Worthing Hospital. He was 90, and suffered a fall at his home in the week prior to his death.

== General and cited references ==
- Watts, Derek (2005). Young Jim: The Jim Parks Story. Stroud, Gloucestershire, UK: Tempus Press. ISBN 9780752435503. OCLC 132290796.

Sporting positions
Preceded by The 9th Nawab of Pataudi	Sussex county cricket captain 1967–1968	Succeeded by Mike Griffith
