= 1993 Axa Equity & Law League =

- Administrator(s): Test and County Cricket Board
- Cricket format: Limited overs cricket (50 overs per innings)
- Tournament format(s): League
- Champions: Glamorgan (1st title)
- Participants: 18
- Matches: 153
- Most runs: 854 Carl Hooper (Kent)
- Most wickets: 31 Franklyn Stephenson (Sussex)

The 1993 AXA Equity & Law League was the twenty-fifth edition of English cricket's Sunday League. The competition was won for the first time by Glamorgan County Cricket Club.

== The season ==
The season's competition had a number of changes. This was the first season to be sponsored by AXA (Equity and Law). The overs went up from 40 per side to 50, the teams would play with a white ball and dark sightscreens and each team would be wearing their own coloured clothing.

The season came down to a nail-biting finish with Kent and Glamorgan tied on points going into the final round of matches. These teams were scheduled to play one another on the last day of the season at the St Lawrence Ground, Canterbury in a televised match. Glamorgan beat Kent by six wickets to win the league. This match was Glamorgan and West Indies batsman Viv Richards's final one day match and fittingly he was at the crease when the winning runs were scored.

== Standings ==
Team	Pld	W	T	L	N/R	A	Pts	Rp100
Glamorgan (C)	17	13	0	2	1	1	56	75.416
Kent	17	12	0	3	2	0	52	81.657
Surrey	17	11	0	4	2	0	48	73.058
Sussex	17	10	1	5	1	0	44	78.326
Northamptonshire	17	9	1	5	2	0	42	71.153
Lancashire	17	8	1	5	3	0	40	68.413
Durham	17	8	0	7	2	0	36	70.644
Middlesex	17	7	2	6	2	0	36	70.342
Yorkshire	17	8	0	8	1	0	34	71.632
Warwickshire	17	7	0	8	2	0	32	70.51
Derbyshire	17	7	0	8	1	1	32	68.339
Essex	17	7	1	8	1	0	32	66.497
Gloucestershire	17	5	1	9	2	0	26	64.286
Leicestershire	17	5	0	10	1	1	24	69.933
Hampshire	17	4	0	9	2	2	24	68.859
Worcestershire	17	4	1	10	2	0	22	65.071
Nottinghamshire	17	4	0	12	1	0	18	74.645
Somerset	17	2	0	12	2	1	14	62.021
Team marked (C) finished as champions. Source: CricketArchive

== See also ==
Sunday League
