= Robin Martin-Jenkins =

English cricketer

Personal information
- Full name: Robin Simon Christopher Martin-Jenkins
- Born: 28 October 1975 (age 51); Guildford, Surrey, England
- Height: 6 ft 5 in (1.96 m)
- Batting: Right-handed
- Bowling: Right-arm medium pace

Domestic team information
- Years: Team
- 1994–2010: Sussex
- 1996: British Universities

Career statistics
Competition	FC	LA	T20
Matches	162	208	31
Runs scored	6520	1865	205
Batting average	31.04	15.04	14.64
100s/50s	3/35	–/3	–/1
Top score	205*	68*	56*
Balls bowled	21886	9104	625
Wickets	384	219	24
Bowling average	32.83	29.49	32.54
5 wickets in innings	6	–	–
10 wickets in match	–	–	–
Best bowling	7/51	4/22	4/20
Catches/stumpings	46/–	43/–	10/–
- Source: , 22 January 2009

Robin Simon Christopher Martin-Jenkins (born 28 October 1975) is an English former cricketer who played for Sussex County Cricket Club and British Universities. He is 6 feet 5 inches (1.96 m) tall. He is the son of cricket writer and journalist Christopher Martin-Jenkins, and as such has been nicknamed RMJ (a reference to his father CMJ).

== Early life ==
Martin-Jenkins was educated at Radley College and was in the same college house at the same time as cricketers Andrew Strauss and Ben Hutton. These three were among other successes in the first batch of 1997 at Durham University's Centre of Excellence for Cricket, which was led by former test batsman Graeme Fowler. Strauss said that he was helped by Hutton and Martin-Jenkins, as he "gained confidence from the fact that I was not the only person who was prepared to take the risk of jumping off the City-bound conveyer belt."

== Cricket career ==
Martin-Jenkins played his entire first-class career for Sussex, except for one first-class match for British Universities in 1996. He scored his maiden first-class century in 2001, and in 2002, he and Mark Davis scored a record eighth-wicket partnership for Sussex of 291, and Martin-Jenkins also hit his career best score of 205*. As of 2015, this is still the highest eighth-wicket partnership for Sussex. He was a prominent member of both the 2003, 2006 and 2007 County Championship winning teams; in 2011, Steve James writing in the Wisden Cricketers' Almanack described Martin-Jenkins and James Kirtley (who also retired in 2010) as "consistent and reliable performers who are role models and guardians of a team ethos that can endure." He described Martin-Jenkins as "the most solid of all-rounders".

== Retirement and post-retirement ==
In July 2010, Martin-Jenkins announced his retirement at Hove on 19 July 2010, in order to become a teacher. In his final season, he averaged 62.90 with the bat, and took 30 wickets at an average of under 20 runs per wicket. He taught at Hurstpierpoint College, and in 2014 he moved to Harrow School, where he taught Geography and was the house master of Moretons. He moved on to become Head of Geography at Bede's Senior School in 2023, of which its junior school, Bede's Prep School was where his father, Christopher Martin-Jenkins, was an alumnus.

In 2015, Bede's Senior School opened a new pavilion in memory of Christopher Martin-Jenkins, and Robin Martin-Jenkins rang the bell to signal the start of play.
