= Michael Yardy =

English cricketer

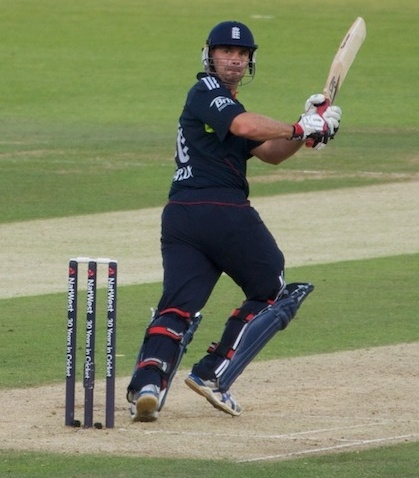
- Yardy in 2010

Personal information
- Full name: Michael Howard Yardy
- Born: 27 November 1980 (age 45); Pembury, Kent, England
- Height: 6 ft 0 in (1.83 m)
- Batting: Left-handed
- Bowling: Slow left-arm orthodox Left-arm medium
- Role: All-rounder

International information
- National side: England (2006–2011)
- ODI debut (cap 198): 8 September 2006 v Pakistan
- Last ODI: 6 March 2011 v South Africa
- ODI shirt no.: 40
- T20I debut (cap 20): 28 August 2006 v Pakistan
- Last T20I: 14 January 2011 v Australia
- T20I shirt no.: 40

Domestic team information
- Years: Team
- 1999–2015: Sussex (squad no. 20)
- 2010/11: Central Districts

Career statistics
Competition	ODI	T20I	FC	LA
Matches	28	14	193	209
Runs scored	326	96	10,693	3,677
Batting average	20.37	32.00	36.49	25.01
100s/50s	0/2	0/0	23/50	0/23
Top score	60*	35*	257	98*
Balls bowled	1,332	276	3,675	6,408
Wickets	21	11	29	141
Bowling average	51.19	27.18	75.58	38.82
5 wickets in innings	0	0	1	1
10 wickets in match	0	0	0	0
Best bowling	3/24	2/19	5/83	6/27
Catches/stumpings	10/–	8/–	184/–	75/–
- Source: ESPNcricinfo, 31 December 2019

Michael Howard Yardy (born 27 November 1980) is an English cricket coach and former professional cricketer who played limited over internationals for the England cricket team between 2006 and 2011. He played as a left-handed batsman and captained Sussex County Cricket Club. He had an unusual batting technique which involved him taking guard outside leg stump before a pronounced shuffle across the crease immediately prior to the bowler releasing the ball (the way that Shivnarine Chanderpaul batted) . Yardy also bowled slow left arm with a characteristic round armed action, and was used as a bowling all-rounder in England's One Day International and Twenty20 International teams. Yardy retired from professional cricket at the end of the 2015 season. Yardy was a member of the England team that won the 2010 ICC World Twenty20.

== Early life ==
Yardy was born at Pembury in Kent in 1980. He was educated at William Parker School in Hastings, playing cricket for the school. He first played for the Sussex Second XI in 1996 whilst still at school.

== Domestic career ==
Yardy made his Sussex debut in an early-season NatWest Trophy game against Hertfordshire in May 1999. He played against Sri Lanka A the same year but did not play regularly in the Sussex team until the 2001 season. He played ten games in 2002, but only seven in total over the next two seasons, before cementing a place in the team in 2005. He enjoyed an excellent domestic summer that season, making 1,520 first-class runs at a batting average of 56.29 run an innings, with five centuries, including a career-best 257 against the touring Bangladeshis in May. His 257 was the highest for Sussex since 1945 at the time. In the one-day game, Yardy was less successful with the bat, averaging well under 20, but he achieved a career-best bowling performance of 6/27 against Warwickshire in the Totesport League.

He was appointed as Sussex's County Captain for the 2009 season, succeeding Chris Adams. In his first Season as captain he led Sussex to the Twenty20 Cup and the Pro 40 titles. He stood down as captain for the County Championship and CB40 in July 2012 and in the Twenty20 Cup at the end of the season.

== International career ==
Yardy was picked for the England A tour of West Indies in 2005–06, and the following summer he forced his way into the full England team. In August 2006, he was provisionally selected for England's ICC Champions Trophy initial squad of 30, retaining his place in the final 14-man squad. On 23 August, he was also named in the 16-man squad for the NatWest Series of One Day Internationals against Pakistan.

Making his full international debut in a Twenty20 international at Bristol on 28 August, Yardy made an unbeaten 24 from 14 balls and took a wicket in debut. He went on to make his ODI debut against Pakistan at Trent Bridge in September, taking 3/24, the best figures by an England male spinner on ODI debut. (Note: Several England women players have taken better figures on ODI debut, the best as of December 2019 being the 5/12 taken by Laura Harper in 1999.)

In December, Yardy was not included in the England squad for the one-day series in Australia following a disappointing 2006 ICC Champions Trophy performance in India. He captained of the England A squad to tour Bangladesh in 2007 and in June was selected in the 14-man one-day squad for matches against the West Indies.

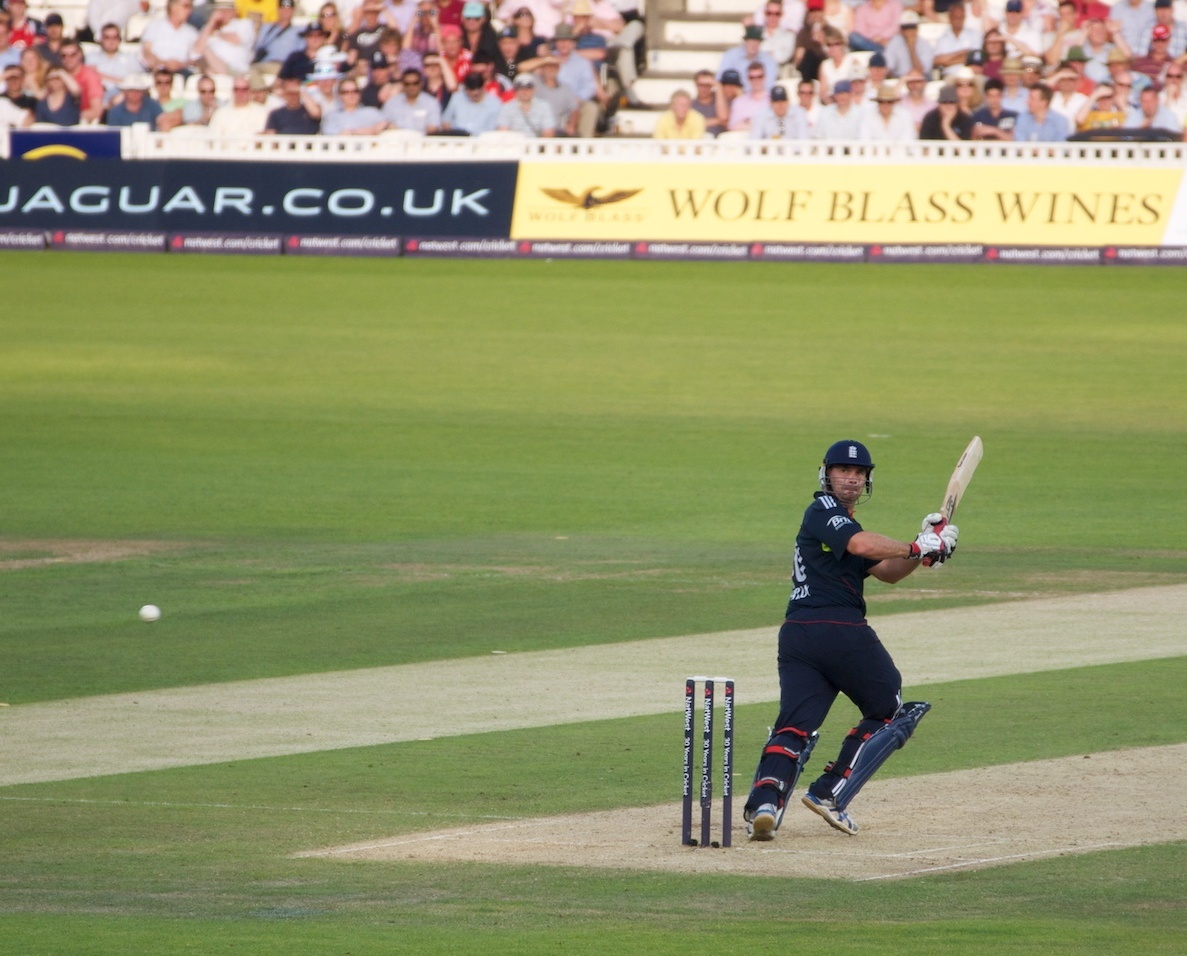
Michael Yardy on his way to a score of 57 for England, in a One Day International against Australia at the Oval in 2010.

After three years, he was recalled for the 2010 World Twenty20 in the West Indies. He was ever-present in the tournament, taking four wickets as England won the tournament, beating Australia in the final. Yardy was then recalled to the ODI team and was again ever-present in the early-summer series against Australia and Bangladesh. Although he only took four wickets in eight games, he proved to be economical at only 4.36 runs an over and scored his first international half-century, making 57 at The Oval against Australia.

Yardy was selected in England's 15-man squad for the 2011 World Cup. He opened the bowling in a match against South Africa, just the second time a spinner had opened the bowling for England in ODIs but on 24 March it was announced that he had flown home from the competition suffering with depression. The competition were the last in his international career. In all he made 42 one-day appearances for England.

== Coaching career ==
After his playing career ended, Yardy completed a sports psychology degree at Chichester University. He coached cricket at Hurstpierpoint College and in 2016 worked with Sussex's under-17 team. After working part-time with First XI players at the end of the 2016 season, Yardy was appointed batting coach at the club in February 2017. The club were clear that they considered he had made a "significant difference" to players. He became the club's Second XI coach ahead of the 2018 season.

After two and a half seasons working at Sussex, during which time he had also coached the England under-19 team, Yardy left the club at the end of July 2019 and took up a position as batting coach at New South Wales ahead of the 2019/20 Australian season. In February 2020 Kent County Cricket Club announced that Yardy would join the coaching team at the club as batting coach in April 2020.

In February 2026, he joined Pakistan Super League franchise Peshawar Zalmi as spin bowling and fielding coach for PSL 2026.
