= Murray Goodwin =

Zimbabwean cricketer

Personal information
- Full name: Murray William Goodwin
- Born: 11 December 1972 (age 53); Salisbury, Rhodesia
- Height: 1.77 m (5 ft 10 in)
- Batting: Right-handed
- Bowling: Legbreak
- Role: Batsman
- Relatives: Jayden Goodwin (son)

International information
- National side: Zimbabwe (1998–2000)
- Test debut (cap 37): 7 January 1998 v Sri Lanka
- Last Test: 1 June 2000 v England
- ODI debut (cap 52): 22 January 1998 v Sri Lanka
- Last ODI: 22 July 2000 v England

Domestic team information
- Years: Team
- 1994/95–2005/06: Western Australia
- 1998/99: Mashonaland
- 2001–2012: Sussex (squad no. 3)
- 2006/07: Warriors
- 2013–2014: Glamorgan (squad no. 40)

Career statistics
Competition	Test	ODI	FC	LA
Matches	19	71	320	383
Runs scored	1,414	1,818	23,723	11,477
Batting average	42.84	27.13	46.69	35.64
100s/50s	3/8	2/8	71/98	14/71
Top score	166*	112*	344*	167
Balls bowled	119	248	713	351
Wickets	0	4	7	7
Bowling average	–	52.50	53.71	43.71
5 wickets in innings	–	0	0	0
10 wickets in match	–	0	0	0
Best bowling	–	1/12	2/23	1/9
Catches/stumpings	10/–	20/–	168/–	115/–
- Source: CricketArchive, 4 November 2023

Murray William Goodwin (born 11 December 1972) is a Zimbabwean former cricketer who played 19 Tests and 71 One Day Internationals. He was a right-handed top-order batsman, strong on the back foot, and a good cutter and puller of the ball.

== International career ==
Born in Rhodesia, Goodwin attended St. John's College (Harare) before his family moved to Perth when he was 13. He moved back to Zimbabwe in the 1990s, and represented the country between 1998 and 2000. His wife had trouble settling in Zimbabwe, and so, after the Zimbabwe tour of England in 2000, they moved back to Australia. He now resides in southwest Western Australia with his family.

Goodwin and Grant Flower set the record for the highest 5th wicket partnership for Zimbabwe in ODI cricket (186*).

== Domestic career ==
After his retirement from international cricket, Goodwin became a regular player for Western Australia and for Sussex in England. He made 1,183 runs for Western Australia in 2003–04, which was then the highest by a Western Australia player in a Sheffield Shield season. He highlighted his consistency with 840 runs the following season. He also played for the Netherlands as an overseas player.

Goodwin holds the Sussex record for the highest individual innings, with 344* against Somerset in 2009, beating his own record of 335* set in 2003. Goodwin's 2003 innings helped Sussex to win their first Championship title, after 164 years. He is also the only Sussex batsman to have twice made a double century and a century in the same match.

Goodwin led Sussex to the league title in the final match of the 2008 NatWest Pro40 competition. After the collapse of Sussex's top and middle order against Nottinghamshire CCC, his 87 not out from 64 balls steered Sussex to victory. Needing three runs from Charlie Shreck's final delivery to tie the match and ensure victory for Sussex in the league table, Goodwin hit a six over long-on to clinch the game.

Goodwin was released by Sussex County Cricket Club in August 2012, but was soon snapped up by Glamorgan, with whom he signed an initial 1-year contract on 17 October 2012. In his first season with Glamorgan, Goodwin averaged over 56 with the bat in the County Championship, leading to a one-year extension to his contract.

== Career best performances ==
Updated 18 October 2013

	Batting				Bowling (innings)			
	Score	Fixture	Venue	Season	Figures	Fixture	Venue	Season
Test	166 not out	Zimbabwe v Pakistan	Bulawayo	1998	–			
ODI	112 not out	Zimbabwe v West Indies	Chester-le-Street	2000	1/12	Zimbabwe v Sri Lanka	Sharjah	1998
FC	344 not out	Sussex v Somerset	Taunton	2009	2/23	Zimbabweans v Lahore City	Lahore	1998
LA	167	Western Australia v New South Wales	Perth	2001	1/9	Mashonaland v England A	Harare	1999
T20	102 not out	Sussex Sharks v Essex Eagles	Chelmsford	2007	–			
