= Harry Parks (cricketer) =

English cricketer (1906–1984)

Personal information
- Born: 18 July 1906; Haywards Heath, Sussex
- Died: 7 May 1984 (aged 77); Taunton, Somerset
- Batting: Right-handed
- Bowling: Right-arm medium

Career statistics
| Competition | First-class |
|---|---|
| Matches | 483 |
| Runs scored | 21,725 |
| Batting average | 33.57 |
| 100s/50s | 42/106 |
| Top score | 200* |
| Balls bowled | 1,208 |
| Wickets | 13 |
| Bowling average | 54.23 |
| 5 wickets in innings | 0 |
| 10 wickets in match | 0 |
| Best bowling | 2/37 |
| Catches/stumpings | 195/– |
- Source: CricketArchive, 11 September 2025

Henry William Parks (18 July 1906 – 7 May 1984) was an English cricketer. He was a right-handed batsman whose first-class career with Sussex lasted from 1926 to 1948. In 483 matches he scored 21,725 runs at an average of 33.57, with 42 centuries and a highest score of 200 not out. He scored 1000 runs in a season 14 times, with a best of 2,122 in 1947. Before World War Two he was a middle-order batsman, but after it he became John Langridge's opening partner.

He was a member of a notable cricketing family, being the brother of Jim Parks senior and the uncle of Jim Parks junior. He stood as a first-class umpire in 1949 and 1950, and played one match for the Commonwealth XI in India in 1949–50, his last first-class match.

In late 1950, Parks was appointed coach of Somerset, serving in the role until 1953. In 1953, he was appointed as a coach at Taunton School.
