= Carl Hopkinson =

English cricketer and coach

Personal information
- Full name: Carl Daniel Hopkinson
- Born: 14 September 1981 (age 45); Brighton, East Sussex, England
- Height: 5 ft 11 in (1.80 m)
- Batting: Right-handed
- Bowling: Right-arm medium

Domestic team information
- Years: Team
- 2000–2009: Sussex

Career statistics
Competition	FC	LA	T20
Matches	64	92	28
Runs scored	2,705	1,400	165
Batting average	27.60	22.95	12.69
100s/50s	3/15	1/6	0/0
Top score	139	123*	26*
Balls bowled	340	566	–
Wickets	2	15	–
Bowling average	131.00	27.33	–
5 wickets in innings	0	0	–
10 wickets in match	0	0	–
Best bowling	1/20	3/19	–
Catches/stumpings	39/–	39/–	0/–
- Source: Cricinfo, 31 October 2009

Carl Hopkinson (born 14 September 1981) is an English former professional cricketer. He played as a right-handed batsman and a right-arm medium pace bowler who was considered a talented fielder.

Born in Sussex, he attended Brighton College and played for Lewes Priory Cricket Club. Playing for Sussex since the beginning of his career, he was given their young player of the year award in 2000, and the following year he made his one-day debut.

He played in his first National League match against Scotland in 2003, bowling a spell of 3/19 and scoring 67 with the bat.

In 2005 he factored more often into the Sussex team, and top scored with 64. In 2006 he helped Sussex win the double, and then in 2007 he played a part in Sussex's County Championship win.

Hopkinson joined the coaching staff at Sussex in 2010 and filled roles as assistant coach, second XI and fielding coach. In 2018 he joined the ECB as Lead Fielding Coach. He took on an additional role as fielding coach for the Northern Superchargers in August 2023. He departed the England Test setup after the 2023 Ashes series, and their white-ball set-up in November 2024, moving to join the Mumbai Indians' global franchise, as England head coach Brendon McCullum elected not to maintain a specialist fielding coach. He temporarily rejoined England to prepare them for the 2026 Men's T20 World Cup.
