= James Kirtley =

English cricketer

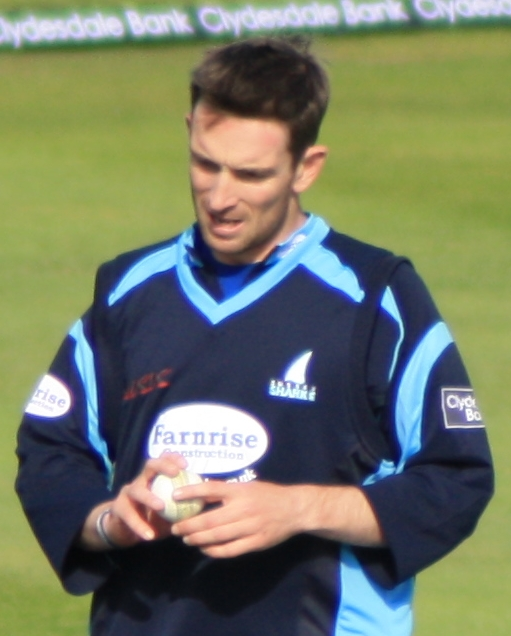

Personal information
- Full name: Robert James Kirtley
- Born: 10 January 1975 (age 51); Eastbourne, Sussex, England
- Nickname: Ambi
- Height: 6 ft 0 in (1.83 m)
- Batting: Right-handed
- Bowling: Right arm fast-medium
- Role: Bowler

International information
- National side: England
- Test debut (cap 616): 14 August 2003 v South Africa
- Last Test: 21 December 2003 v Sri Lanka
- ODI debut (cap 166): 3 October 2001 v Zimbabwe
- Last ODI: 18 April 2004 v West Indies
- ODI shirt no.: 16

Domestic team information
- Years: Team
- 1995–2010: Sussex
- 1996/1997: Mashonaland

Career statistics
Competition	Test	ODI	FC	LA
Matches	4	11	170	253
Runs scored	32	2	2,040	445
Batting average	5.33	1.00	13.16	10.11
100s/50s	0/0	0/0	0/4	0/0
Top score	12	1	59	30*
Balls bowled	1,079	549	31,916	11,098
Wickets	19	9	614	381
Bowling average	29.52	53.44	27.04	23.14
5 wickets in innings	1	0	29	9
10 wickets in match	0	0	4	0
Best bowling	6/34	2/33	7/21	6/50
Catches/stumpings	3/–	5/–	60/–	69/–
- Source: CricketArchive, 18 May 2010

Robert James Kirtley (born 10 January 1975) is a former English Test cricketer. He is a right arm fast medium bowler and a right hand batsman. After prep school at St. Andrews School, Eastbourne, he was educated at Clifton College.

Kirtley is perhaps best known for taking a spectacular catch in a One Day International against India at Lord's. Simon Hughes rated it as the fifth greatest catch of all time.

== ODI career ==
=== First ODI ===
His first One Day International was in 2001, as England beat Zimbabwe by 5 wickets. Whilst not batting, he did take 2-33 off 9.1 overs with the ball. This was his first 'international' encounter, although he bowled Mashonaland to victory against England on their tour of Zimbabwe in 1996/1997. Later in 2001, he received the NBC Denis Compton Award.

=== 2001–2004 ===
Kirtley has played eleven One Day Internationals. He has needed to bat on just two occasions, each time scoring 1. He has taken nine wickets, notably nabbing Virender Sehwag of India and Matthew Hayden of Australia. His best bowling figures in this form of cricket are 2-33, against Bangladesh, and he has a one-day bowling average of 53.44.

== Test career ==
=== First Test ===
He made his Test debut in 2003 against South Africa, as England won by 70 runs. He contributed 4 with the bat over the two innings, facing 54 deliveries. He had more success bowling and took 2–80 in the first innings, off 31 overs - an economy of 2.58 and 6-34 in the second innings, off 16.2 overs. He first trapped Graeme Smith lbw for 5, then Jacques Rudolph lbw for a duck, leaving the Proteas 28–2. Next, he clean bowled Neil McKenzie for 11, snaffled Andrew Hall (caught by Marcus Trescothick) for 0 and caught and bowled Paul Adams for 15. Finally, he dismissed Mark Boucher (caught by Alec Stewart) for 52, as the South Africans crumbled for 131. Finishing with match bowling figures of 8–114, Kirtley was awarded the player of the match award.

=== 2003–2004 ===
Kirtley represented England on three more occasions. After an excellent debut, he was included in the team that again faced South Africa in August 2003. He chipped in with twelve over two innings with the bat, and took 5–145 with the ball, although The Proteas ran out winners by 191 runs.

The third and fourth matches of Kirtley's four match Test career were against Sri Lanka in December 2003. The first game was drawn, with Kirtley taking 2-109 and 2-62, and hitting 3 not out in the first innings. The second encounter was won comprehensively by Sri Lanka, by an innings and 215 runs. England batted first and scored 265, with Kirtley scoring 1. In their reply, the Sri Lankans amassed 628, with all bowlers struggling. Ashley Giles took two wickets at the cost of 190 runs and Gareth Batty conceded 137 with no reward, making Kirtley's return of 2-131 look distinctly presentable. In their reply, England were dismissed for 148. Despite this batting failure by the team, Kirtley hit 12, his best ever score in a Test, off 25 deliveries, including a six, before being bowled by Muttiah Muralitharan.

== Twenty20 career ==
He bowled the first ever t20 ball, against Hampshire at the Rose Bowl. Kirtley was a surprising selection in the England squad for the 2007 World Twenty20 in South Africa, he was named alongside other specialists Darren Maddy, leg spinner Chris Schofield and veteran off spinner and former spin coach Jeremy Snape. Kirtley played one (wicketless) match against Australia.

== Bowling ==
At his best, he was a skiddy bowler with good accuracy, and an excellent cricketing brain. At his worst, he was banned from bowling because of doubts about his action.

== County career ==
In the 2006 C&G Trophy final, Kirtley bowled Sussex to a seemingly improbable victory with match figures of 5-27. (These 5 wickets were notable for all being LBWs). On taking the final, winning wicket, Kirtley was mobbed in celebration on the pitch by his teammates.

His last match for Sussex before retiring from professional cricket after a sixteen-year career, was a Pro 40 one day match against Surrey on Saturday 4 September 2010 at Hove. His final victim was England batsman Kevin Pietersen as the match ended in a tie. Kirtley's figures were 3-61.
