= Jim Parks (cricketer, born 1903) =

English cricketer (1903–1980)

Personal information
- Full name: James Horace Parks
- Born: 12 May 1903; Haywards Heath, Sussex
- Died: 21 November 1980 (aged 77); Cuckfield, West Sussex
- Batting: Right-handed
- Bowling: Right arm slow-medium
- Relatives: Harry Parks (brother); Jim Parks Jr. (son); Bobby Parks (grandson)

International information
- National side: England
- Only Test (cap 295): 26 June 1937 v New Zealand

Domestic team information
- Years: Team
- 1924–1939: Sussex
- 1946/47: Canterbury

Career statistics
Competition	Test	First-class
Matches	1	468
Runs scored	29	21,369
Batting average	14.50	30.74
100s/50s	0/0	41/94
Top score	22	197
Balls bowled	126	60,806
Wickets	3	852
Bowling average	12.00	26.74
5 wickets in innings	0	24
10 wickets in match	0	1
Best bowling	2/26	7/17
Catches/stumpings	0/–	326/–
- Source: Cricinfo, 1 October 2009

James Horace Parks (12 May 1903 – 21 November 1980) was a cricketer who played for Sussex County Cricket Club and England.

Parks was a right-handed opening batsman and a medium-pace bowler of inswingers. He was a regular member of the Sussex county team from 1927 and scored 1,000 runs in every season except one up to 1939, when his first-class career ended with the Second World War in 1935, he did the all - rounder's "double" of 1,000 runs and 100 wickets, but nothing in Parks' career suggested he was an out-of-the-ordinary county cricketer — until 1937.

In that year, by scoring 3,003 runs and taking 101 wickets in the season, he set a record that is all but certainly never to be equalled. Only 13 cricketers have scored more than 2,000 runs and taken 100 wickets in an English season; no other cricketer has ever taken 100 wickets while scoring 3,000 runs. His run total included 11 centuries and he also took 21 catches. Having been termed "solid" earlier in his career, Parks revealed in 1937 a full range of previously unsuspected strokes and was praised by Wisden for his "enterprise".

He was called up for the 1937 Test match against New Zealand at Lord's alongside another debutant, Leonard Hutton. He scored 22 and 7 and took three wickets, but was never chosen again. Unsurprisingly, he was a Wisden Cricketer of the Year in 1938.

After the Second World War, Parks played Lancashire League cricket and was coach at Sussex for a period in the 1960s.

== See also ==
- Double (cricket)
