= All-rounder =

Cricket role

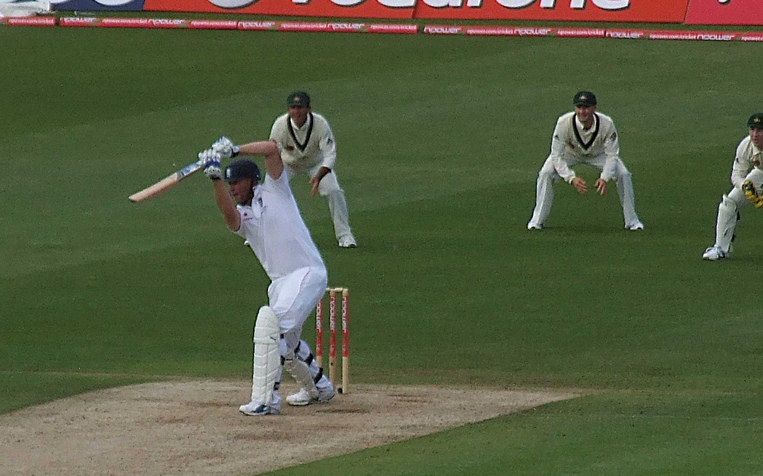
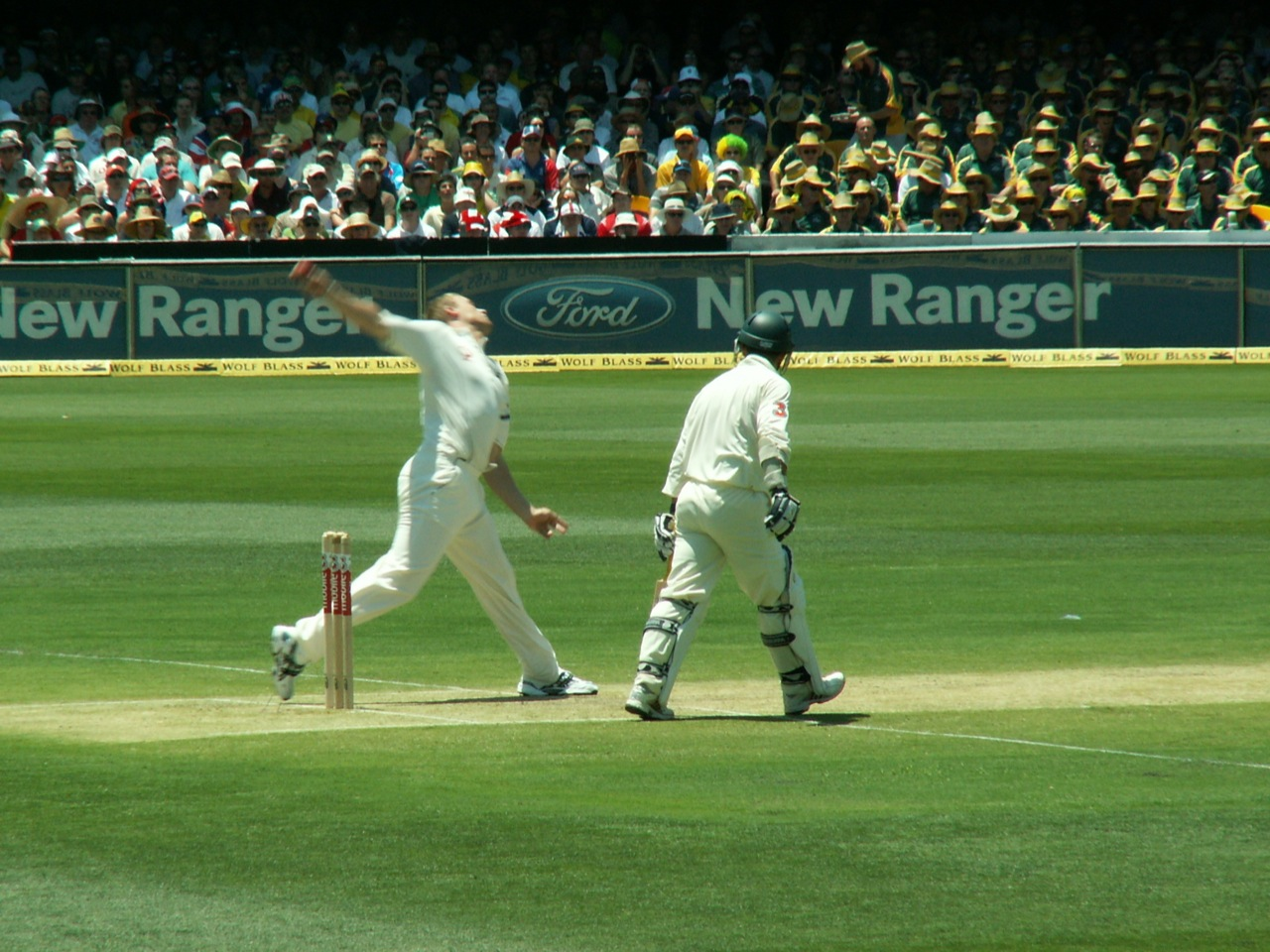
An all-rounder such as Andrew Flintoff is skilled at both batting (top) and bowling (bottom).

An all-rounder is a cricketer who regularly performs well at both batting and bowling. Although all bowlers must bat and quite a handful of batters do bowl occasionally, most players are skilled in only one of the two disciplines and are considered specialists. Some wicket-keepers have the skills of a specialist batter and have been referred to as all-rounders, but the term wicket-keeper-batter is more commonly applied to them, even if they are substitute wicket keepers who also bowl.

== Definition ==
There is no precise qualification for a player to be considered an all-rounder and use of the term tends to be subjective. The generally accepted criterion is that a "genuine allrounder" is someone whose batting or bowling skills, considered alone, would be good enough to win them a place in the team. Another definition of a "genuine all-rounder" is a player who can, through both batting and bowling (though not necessarily both in the same match), consistently "win matches for the team" (i.e., propel their team to victory by an outstanding individual performance). By either definition, a genuine all-rounder is quite rare and extremely valuable to a team, effectively operating as two players.

Confusion sometimes arises when a specialist bowler performs well with the bat. For example, West Indies pace bowler Malcolm Marshall achieved ten scores of 50 or above in 107 Test innings between 1978 and 1991, but had a batting average of less than 19. He would be termed a "useful lower-order batter", or indeed "a bowler who bats a bit". Equally, a specialist batter may be termed a "useful change bowler" and a good example of this is Australian Allan Border, who in a Test match against the West Indies in Sydney in January 1989 took 11 wickets for 96 runs (7/46 in the first innings and 4/50 in the second) as the conditions suited his occasionally used left-arm spin.

One of the main constraints to becoming a recognised all-rounder is that batters and bowlers "peak" at different ages. Batters tend to reach their peak in their late twenties after their technique has matured through experience. Conversely, fast bowlers often peak in their early to mid-twenties at the height of their physical prowess. Other bowlers, mostly spinners but also fast bowlers who can "swing" the ball, are still effective in their later careers.

In 2013, Ali Bacher used statistical analysis to argue that there had only been 42 genuine all-rounders in the history of Test cricket. He rated Garry Sobers as the best, followed by Jacques Kallis.

== Categorisation by use of statistics ==
One commonly used statistical rule of thumb is that a player's batting average (the higher the better) should be greater than their bowling average (the lower the better). In Test cricket, only two players i.e., Garfield Sobers and Jacques Kallis, have batting averages that are 20 greater than their bowling averages over their entire careers. However, some other players have achieved such a differential over significant parts of their careers, such as Imran Khan who across 54 Test matches during the 1980s averaged 44 with the bat and 19 with the ball. Wally Hammond and Doug Walters managed differences of 20.7 and 19.2, respectively, between their batting and bowling averages, however, they were generally regarded as occasional bowlers who could break partnerships rather than genuine all-rounders. Based on an analysis of runs scored, balls bowled and wickets taken by batting position, it was suggested in a 2022 article that to be considered a genuine all-rounder, a player should average at least 49.3 runs and take at least two wickets per game – a record achieved by only 13 players in the history of Test cricket.

In overall first-class cricket, there are several players with significantly higher batting averages. Statistically, few can challenge Frank Woolley who had a batting average of 40.77 and a bowling average of 19.87. Woolley took over 2000 wickets in his career, scored more runs than anyone except Jack Hobbs and is the only non-wicketkeeper to have taken more than 1000 catches.

Many all-rounders are better at bowling than batting or vice versa. Very few are equally good at both and hardly any have been outstanding at both. Thus the terms "bowling all-rounder" and "batting all-rounder" have come into use. For example, Richard Hadlee had an excellent bowling average of 22.29 in Tests and a passable (yet unspectacular) batting average of 27.16, leading him to be termed a "bowling all-rounder", while the same can be said about Jason Holder, Kyle Mayers, Justin Greaves and Chris Woakes. Meanwhile, a player like Jacques Kallis (batting average of 55.37 and bowling average of 32.65 in Tests) is known as a "batting all-rounder".

Also, batting all-rounders may not bowl much due to injury concerns (e.g. Corey Anderson, Angelo Mathews), or their batting skills are far better than their bowling to begin with (e.g. Kane Williamson, Steve Smith) to the point they revert to being known as a batter.

== Notable all-round feats ==
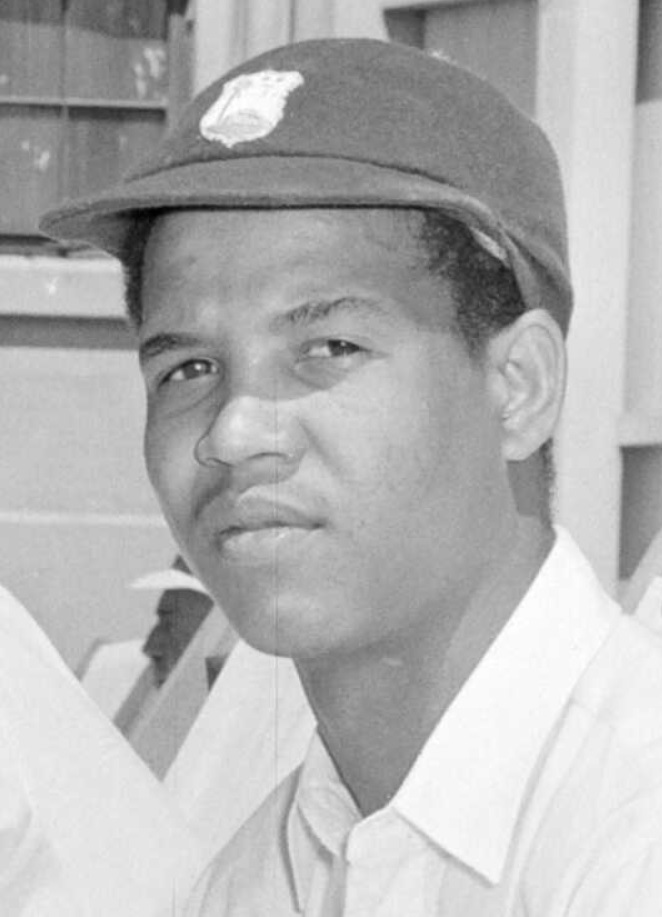
- Sir Garfield Sobers is considered as one of the most decorated all-rounders of all time.
  V. E. Walker of Middlesex, playing for England versus Surrey at The Oval on 21, 22 & 23 July 1859, took all ten wickets in the Surrey first innings and followed this by scoring 108 in the England second innings, having been the not out batter in the first (20*). He took a further four wickets in Surrey's second innings. England won by 392 runs.
- On 15 August 1862, E. M. Grace carried his bat through the entire MCC innings, scoring 192 not out of a total of 344. Then, bowling underarm, he took all 10 wickets in the Kent first innings for 69 runs. However, this is not an official record as it was a 12-a-side game (though one of the Kent batters was injured).
- The first player to perform the double of 1000 runs and 100 wickets in an English season was W. G. Grace in 1873. He scored 2139 runs at 71.30 and took 106 wickets at 12.94. Grace completed eight doubles to 1886 and it was not until 1882 that another player (C. T. Studd) accomplished the feat.
- In the 1906 English cricket season, George Hirst achieved the unique feat of scoring over 2000 runs and taking over 200 wickets. He scored 2385 runs including six centuries at 45.86 with a highest score of 169. He took 208 wickets at 16.50 with a best analysis of 7/18. In the same season, Hirst achieved another unique feat when he scored a century in both innings and took five wickets in both innings of the same match. Playing for Yorkshire versus Somerset at Bath, Hirst scored 111 and 117 not out, and took 6/70 and 5/45.
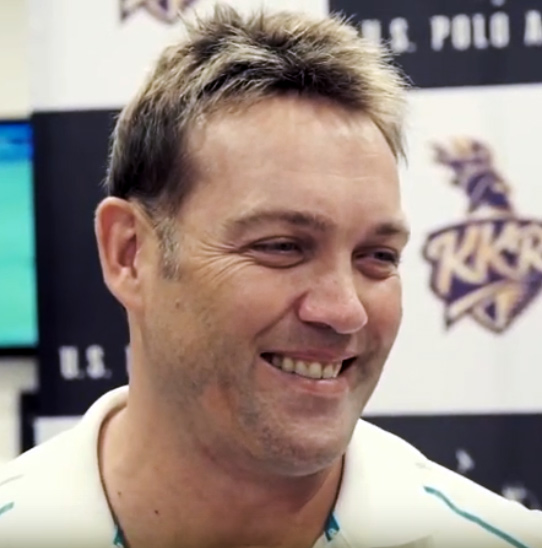
  Jacques Kallis is the only All-rounder in the history of the game to score more than 10,000 runs and take over 250 wickets in both ODI and Test match cricket.
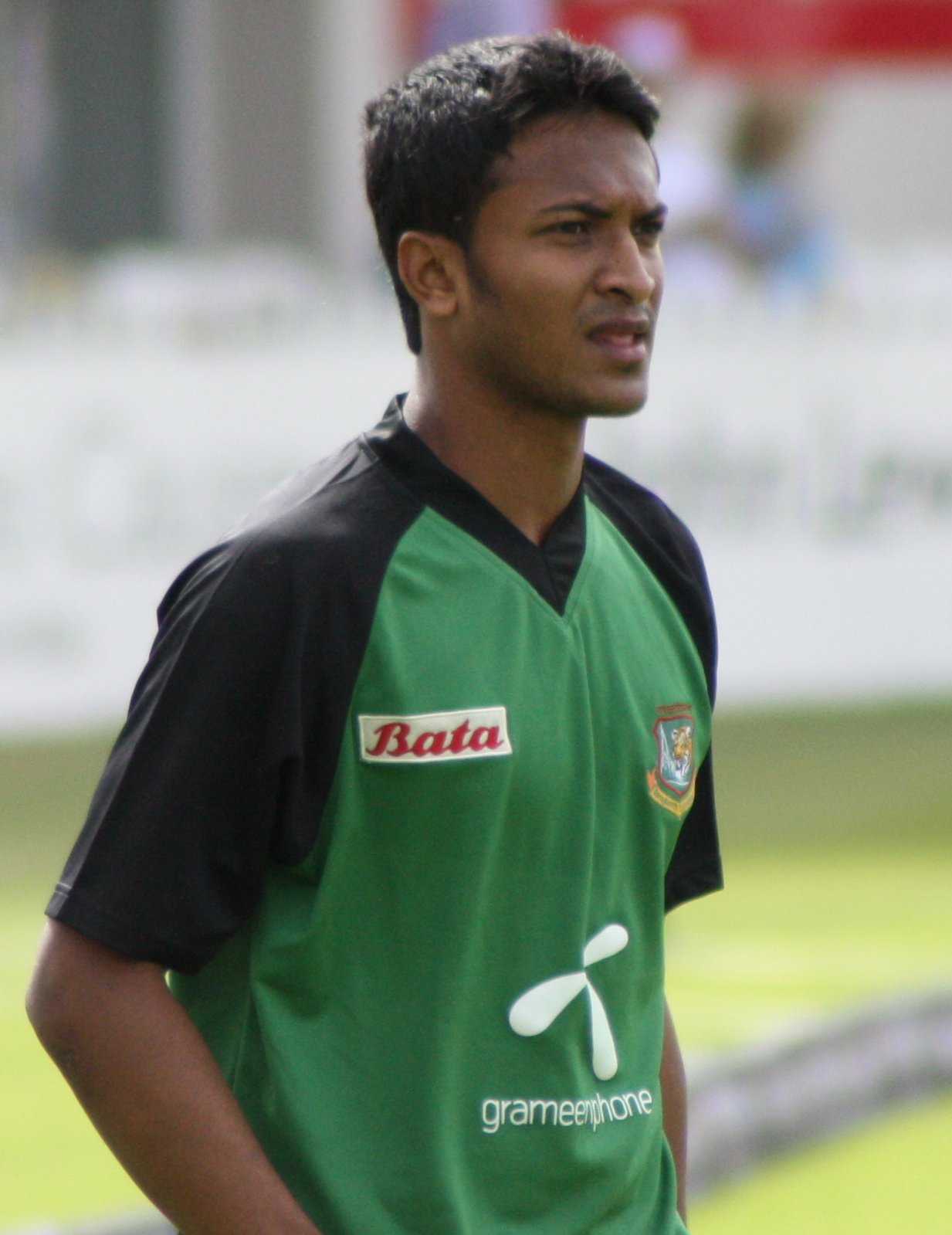
  Shakib Al Hasan is considered one of the best all-rounders of all time. He is the only all-rounder in history of the game to score more than 14000 runs and take over 700 wickets.
  George Giffen (1886, 1893 and 1896) and Warwick Armstrong (1905, 1909 and 1921) achieved the double in an English season three times, the most by members of touring teams.
- Betty Wilson was the first player, male or female, to score a century and take ten wickets in a Test match. She scored 12 and 100 and took 7/7 and 4/9 against England at the Junction Oval in Melbourne in 1958.
- Alan Davidson was the first male player to take ten wickets and score one hundred runs in a Test match, though without scoring a century. Playing for Australia against West Indies at Brisbane in 1960–61, he took 5/135 and 6/87, and scored 44 and 80 in what became the first Tied Test. He was playing throughout with a broken finger.
- Twenty-seven players, on a total of 40 occasions, have taken five wickets in an innings and scored a century in the same Test match. Ian Botham achieved this feat five times, Ravichandran Ashwin four times, Enid Bakewell and Betty Wilson three times, while Jacques Kallis, Garfield Sobers, Mushtaq Mohammed, and Shakib Al Hasan have all done so twice. Imran Khan, Ben Stokes, Mushtaq Mohmmad, Garfield Sobers, and Denis Atkinson are the only captains to have done so.
- Betty Wilson (see above), Enid Bakewell, Ian Botham, Imran Khan and Shakib Al Hasan are the only players who have achieved the feat of scoring a century and taking 10 wickets in a Test match.
- In 2013, Bangladesh's Sohag Gazi became the first, and so far only, player to score a century and take hat-trick in same Test match against New Zealand.
- Kapil Dev is the only player to score 5000 runs and take 400 wickets in Test cricket. He is also the youngest player to score 1000 runs and reach the 100, 200 and 300 wicket mark in men's Test cricket.
- Viv Richards, Paul Collingwood and Rohan Mustafa are the only male players to have taken a 5-wicket haul and scored a hundred in the same One Day International. Fourteen more players have taken a 5-wicket haul and scored a half century in the same game in the format. Shahid Afridi is the only player to achieve this feat thrice in his career and Yuvraj Singh and Shakib Al Hasan are the only cricketers to do so in a World Cup match.
- Amelia Kerr, for New Zealand against Ireland in Dublin in 2018, scored 232* (the highest score in women's ODI history), sharing a second-wicket stand of 295 (the second highest in women's ODI history) with Leigh Kasperek, and took 5/17 in the second innings.
- Jacques Kallis, Shahid Afridi and Shakib Al Hasan are the only three all-rounders in the history of international cricket to reach 10,000 runs and take 500 wickets across all three formats.
- In 2015, Shakib Al Hasan of Bangladesh became the first, and so far only, cricketer in history to be ranked the No. 1 all-rounder by ICC in its Player Rankings in all three formats of the game (Test, ODI and T20I). (Note: at the same time)
- In 2024, Shakib Al Hasan of Bangladesh became the first, and so far only, cricketer in history to achieve both 14000+ runs and 700+ wickets in international cricket.
- Shakib Al Hasan is the only all-rounder to cross 100 wickets and 1000 runs in every format.
- Moeen Ali and Shakib Al Hasan are the only players to have taken at least 25 wickets in T20Is, 100 wickets in both Tests and ODIs, while also scoring over 1000 runs in every format.
- Shane Watson is the only player with a century and four -wicket haul in every format.

== See also ==
- Two-way player, the equivalent term in several other sports
- Cricket terminology
- Double (cricket)
- Bowler (cricket)
- Wicket-keeper
- Fielder
- Batter
