= Sussex County Cricket Club =

English cricket club

- One Day name: Sussex Sharks

Personnel
- Captain: TBA; Ollie Robinson (FC)
- One Day captain: Jack Carson (LA); Tymal Mills (T20)
- Coach: Matt Walker
- Overseas player: Keith Dudgeon

Team information
- Founded: 1839; 187 years ago
- Home ground: County Cricket Ground, Hove
- Capacity: 6,000

History
- First-class debut: MCC in 1839 at Lord's
- Championship wins: 3
- National League/Pro40 wins: 3
- FP Trophy wins: 5
- Twenty20 Cup wins: 1
- NatWest Pro40 wins: 1
- Official website: sussexcricket.co.uk
First-class
One-day
T20

Sussex County Cricket Club is the oldest of eighteen first-class county clubs within the domestic cricket structure of England and Wales. It represents the historic county of Sussex. Its limited overs team is called the Sussex Sharks. The club was founded in 1839 as a successor to the various Sussex county cricket team (pre-1839), including the old Brighton Cricket Club, which had been representative of the county of Sussex as a whole since the 1720s. The club has always held first-class status. Sussex have competed in the County Championship since the official start of the competition in 1890 and have played in every top-level domestic cricket competition in England.

The club colours are traditionally blue and white and the shirt sponsors are Galloways Accounting for the LV County Championship and Dafabet for Royal London One-Day Cup matches and Vitality Blast T20 matches. Its home ground is the County Cricket Ground, Hove. Sussex also play matches around the county at Arundel, Eastbourne and Horsham.

Sussex won its first official County Championship title in 2003 and subsequently became the dominant team of the decade, repeating the success in 2006 and 2007. In 2006 Sussex achieved ‘the double’, beating Lancashire to clinch the C&G Trophy, before winning the County Championship following an emphatic victory against Nottinghamshire at Trent Bridge, in which Sussex defeated their hosts by an innings and 245 runs. Sussex then won the title for the third time in five years in 2007, when in a nail-biting finale on the last day of the season, Sussex defeated Worcestershire early in the day and then had to wait until past five o'clock as title rivals Lancashire narrowly failed to beat Surrey – prompting relieved celebrations at the County Cricket Ground, Hove. Sussex enjoyed further limited overs success with consecutive Pro40 wins in 2008 and 2009 as well as beating Somerset at Edgbaston to lift the 2009 Twenty20 Cup. The south coast county ended the decade having won ten trophies in ten years.

On 1 November 2015, Sussex County Cricket Club (SCCC) merged with the Sussex Cricket Board (SCB) to form a single governing body for cricket in Sussex, called Sussex Cricket Limited (SCL).

== Honours ==
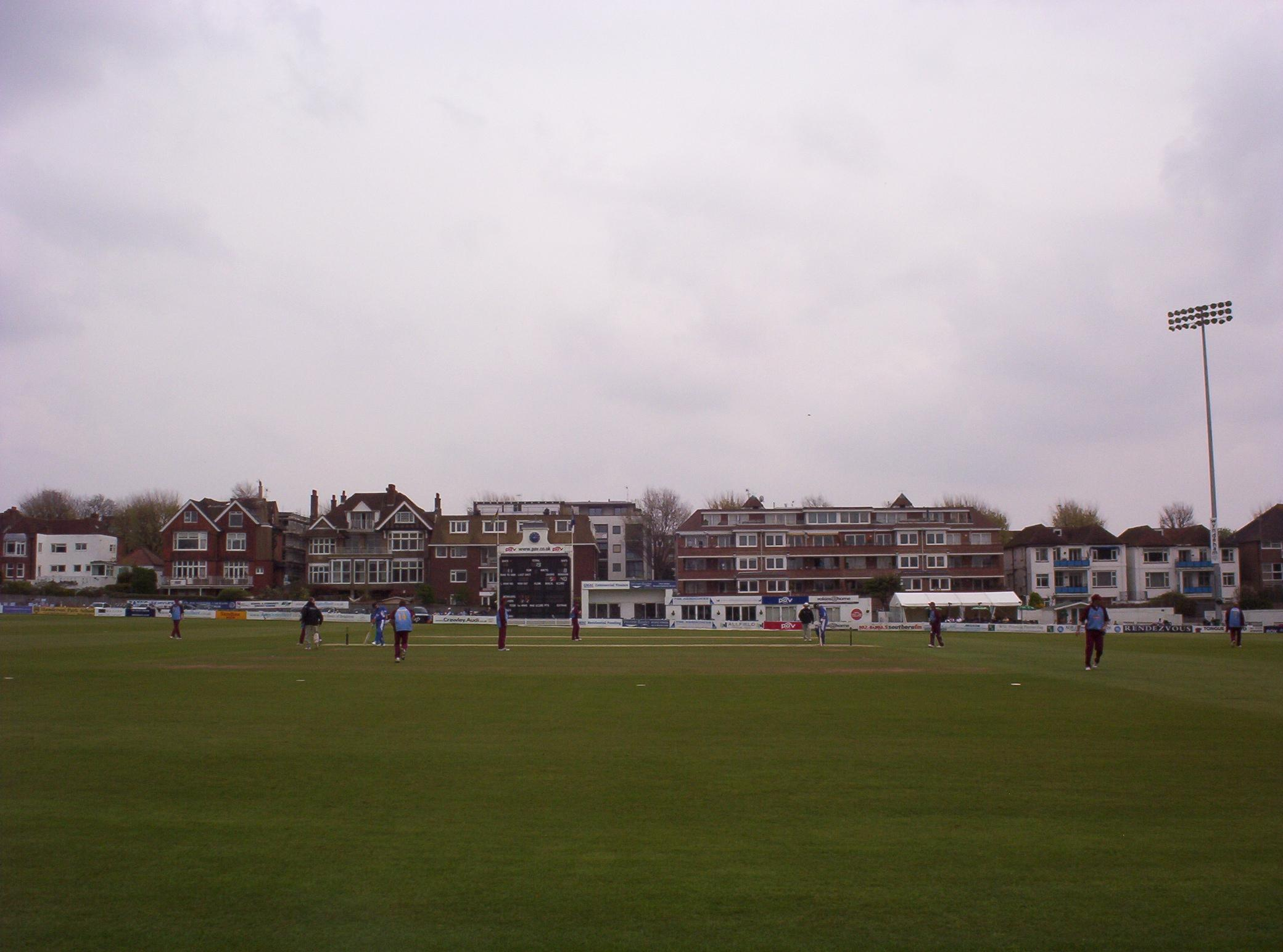
Sussex field against Derbyshire at Hove on 24 April 2005

=== First XI honours ===
- County Championship (3) – 2003, 2006, 2007

Division Two (3) – 2001, 2010, 2024

- Friends Provident Trophy (Note: Formerly known as the Gillette Cup (1963–1980), NatWest Trophy (1981–2000) and C&G Trophy (2001–2006)) (5) – 1963, 1964, 1978, 1986, 2006
- Pro40 National League (Note: Formerly known as the Sunday League (1969–1998)) (3) – 1982, 2008, 2009

Division Two (2) – 1999, 2005

- Twenty20 Cup (1) – 2009

=== Second XI honours ===
- Second XI Championship (3) – 1978, 1990, 2007
- Second XI Trophy (1) – 2005

== Earliest cricket ==
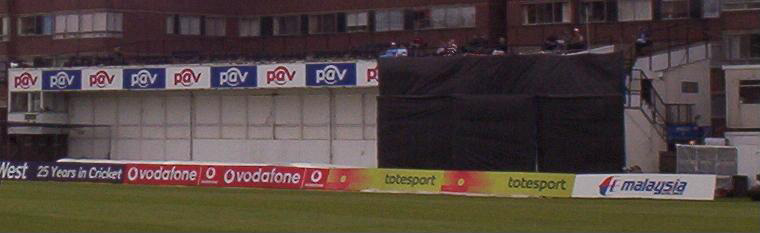
The Arthur Gilligan stand at Hove

Sussex, along with Kent, is believed to be the birthplace of cricket. It is believed that cricket was invented by children living on the Weald in Anglo-Saxon or Norman times.

The first definite mention of cricket in Sussex relates to ecclesiastical court records in 1611 which state that two parishioners of Sidlesham in West Sussex failed to attend church on Easter Sunday because they were playing cricket. They were fined 12d each and made to do penance.

Cricket became established in Sussex during the 17th century and the earliest village matches took place before the English Civil War. It is believed that the earliest county teams were formed in the aftermath of the Restoration in 1660. In 1697, the earliest "great match" recorded was for 50 guineas apiece between two elevens at a venue in Sussex.

Matches involving the two great Sussex patrons Charles Lennox, 2nd Duke of Richmond and Sir William Gage, 7th Baronet were first recorded in 1725. The earliest known use of Sussex in a match title occurred in 1729. From 1741, Richmond patronised the famous Slindon Cricket Club, whose team was representative of the county.

After the death of Richmond in 1751, Sussex cricket declined until the emergence of the Brighton club at its Prince of Wales Ground in 1790. This club sustained cricket in Sussex through the Napoleonic Wars and, as a result, the county team was very strong in the 1820s when it included the great bowlers Jem Broadbridge and William Lillywhite.

== Origin of club ==
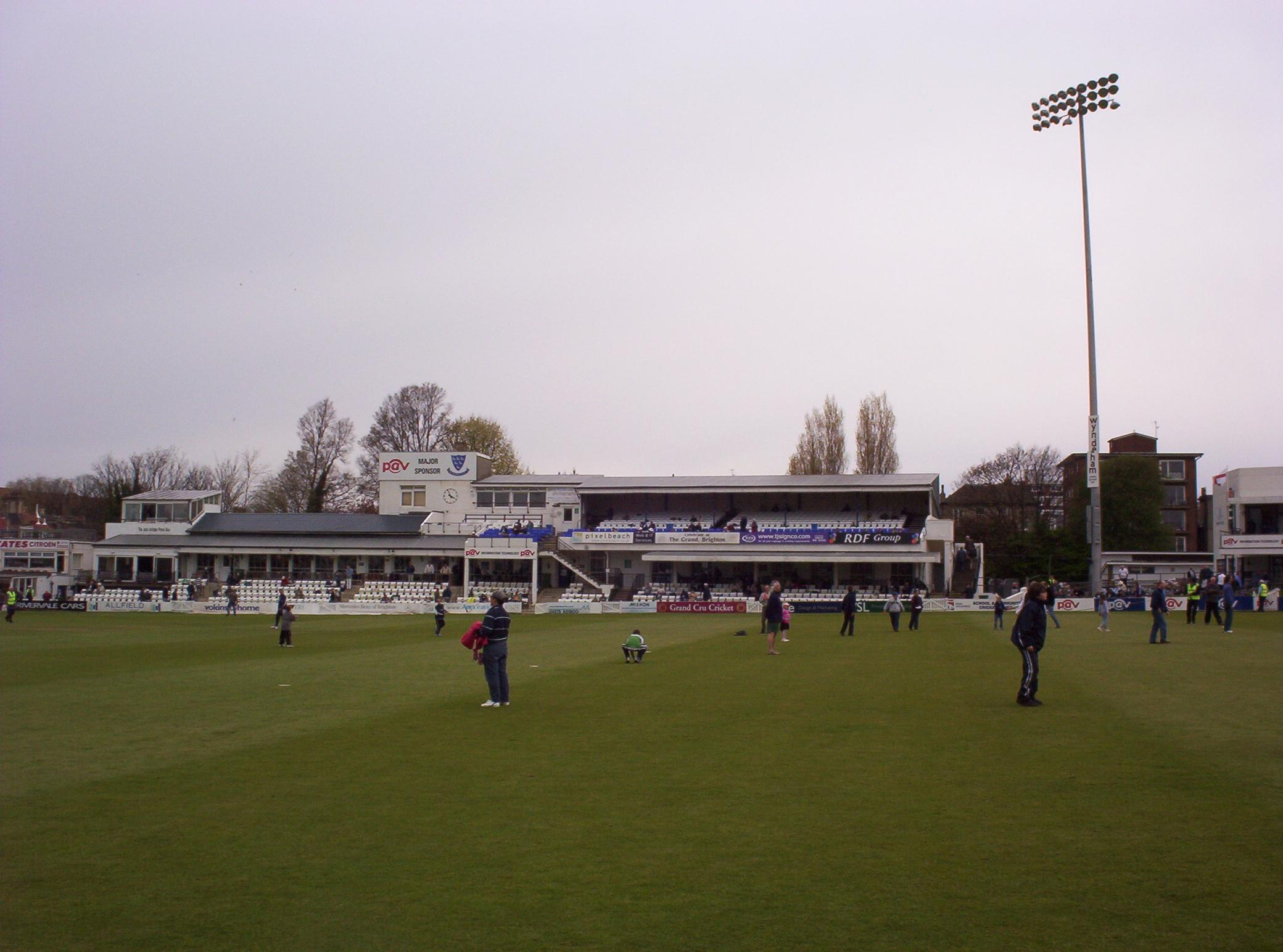
The Pavilion at Hove

On 17 June 1836, the Sussex Cricket Fund was set up to support county matches, after a meeting in Brighton. This led directly to the formation of Sussex County Cricket Club on 1 March 1839, England's oldest county club. The side played its initial first-class match against MCC at Lord's in June 1839.

== Sussex crest ==
The Sussex crest depicts a mythological, footless bird called the martlet, and is similar to the coat of arms of Sussex. Capped players have six martlets on their sweaters, and the crest with gold trimming on their caps; uncapped players instead have only the club crest on their left breast, and white trimming on their caps.

== Sussex grounds ==
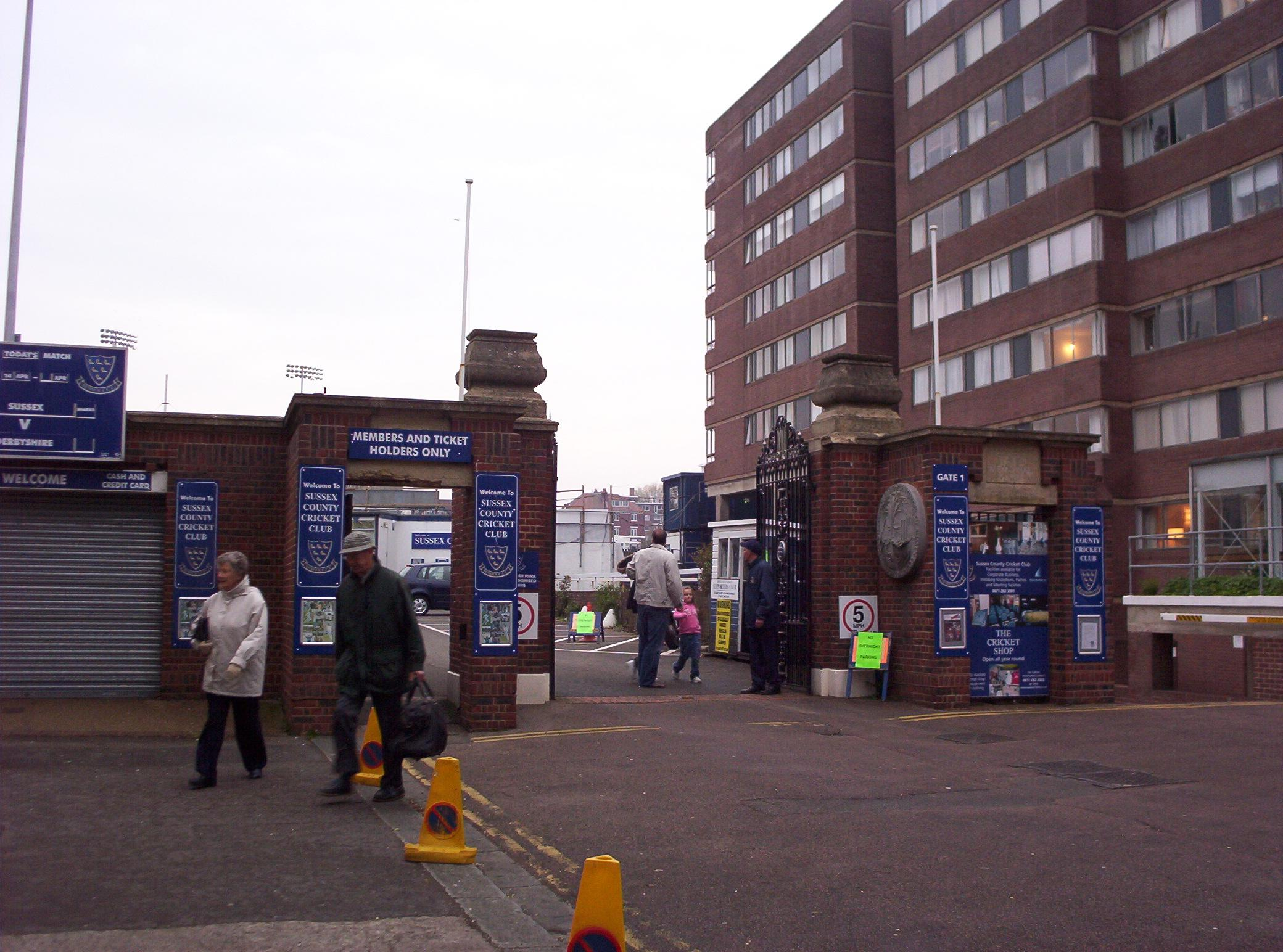
Exit of the County Ground at Hove

In total, Sussex CCC have played at 17 grounds, four of which have been in Brighton and Hove. The first County match was played at Eaton Road on 6 June 1872 against Gloucestershire. Currently, the main venue for the club's First and Second XI is The County Ground in Hove, although matches are also played regularly at the grounds at Arundel and Horsham. Other grounds for first class matches have included Sheffield Park, Chichester, Worthing, Eastbourne and Hastings.

== Current squad ==
- No. denotes the player's squad number, as worn on the back of their shirt.
- ‡ denotes players with international caps.
- * denotes a player who has been awarded a county cap.

No.	Name	Nationality	Birth date	Batting style	Bowling style	Notes
Batters
20	Tom Haines*	England	28 October 1998 (age 28)	Left-handed	Right-arm medium	
27	Tom Clark*	England	27 February 2001 (age 25)	Left-handed	Right-arm medium	
30	James Coles*	England	2 April 2004 (age 22)	Right-handed	Slow left-arm orthodox	England development contract
34	Jack Leaning	England	18 October 1993 (age 33)	Right-handed	Right-arm off break	
All-rounders
40	Danial Ibrahim	England	9 August 2004 (age 22)	Right-handed	Right-arm fast-medium	
50	Joey Evison	England	14 November 2001 (age 24)	Right-handed	Right-arm fast-medium	
53	Tom Price	England	2 January 2000 (age 26)	Right-handed	Right-arm fast-medium	
Wicket-keepers
11	Oli Carter	England	2 November 2001 (age 24)	Right-handed	—	
28	Charlie Tear ‡	Scotland	12 June 2004 (age 22)	Right-handed	—	
Bowlers
4	Danny Briggs ‡	England	30 April 1991 (age 35)	Right-handed	Slow left-arm orthodox	White ball contract
7	Tymal Mills* ‡	England	12 August 1992 (age 34)	Right-handed	Left-arm fast	T20 captain White ball contract
16	Jack Carson*	Ireland	3 December 2000 (age 25)	Right-handed	Right-arm off break	LA captain
21	Sean Hunt	England	7 December 2001 (age 24)	Right-handed	Left-arm fast-medium	
22	Jofra Archer* ‡	England	1 April 1995 (age 31)	Right-handed	Right-arm fast	England central contract
25	Ollie Robinson* ‡	England	1 December 1993 (age 32)	Right-handed	Right-arm fast-medium	FC captain; England central contract
83	Dom Goodman	England	23 October 2000 (age 26)	Right-handed	Right-arm fast-medium	
—	Keith Dudgeon	South Africa	7 November 1995 (age 30)	Right-handed	Right-arm fast-medium	Overseas player
—	Alfie Smethurst	England	10 December 2006 (age 19)	Left-handed	Slow left-arm orthodox	
36	Ari Karvelas	Greece	20 March 1994 (age 32)	Right-handed	Right-arm fast-medium	
Source: Updated: 1 October 2026

== Coaching staff ==
- Head coach/Director of Cricket: Paul Farbrace
- Batting coach: Grant Flower
- Bowling coach: James Kirtley

== Notable Sussex players ==
This list includes those Sussex players who have played in Test cricket since 1877, One Day International cricket since 1971, or have made an outstanding contribution (e.g.: scoring most runs or taking most wickets in a season).

Afghanistan

- Rashid Khan

Australia

- Jason Behrendorff
- Michael Bevan
- Alex Carey
- Michael Di Venuto
- Tony Dodemaide
- Ryan Harris
- Travis Head
- Steve Magoffin
- Josh Philippe
- Steve Smith
- Jason Voros

Bangladesh

- Mustafizur Rahman

Bermuda

- Delray Rawlins

England

- Chris Adams
- Tim Ambrose
- Jofra Archer
- Ravi Bopara
- Ted Bowley
- Danny Briggs
- Jem Broadbridge
- Harry Butt
- Henry Charlwood
- George Cox senior
- Mason Crane
- Jemmy Dean
- Ted Dexter
- Kumar Shri Duleepsinhji
- Steven Finn
- C. B. Fry
- George Garton
- Ed Giddins
- Tony Greig
- Chris Jordan
- James Kirtley
- James Langridge
- John Langridge
- Jason Lewry
- William Lillywhite
- Robin Martin-Jenkins
- Stuart Meaker
- Tymal Mills
- Richard Montgomerie
- Peter Moores
- Alan Oakman
- Monty Panesar
- Paul Parker
- Jim Parks, Jr.
- Jim Parks, Sr.
- Tony Pigott
- Matt Prior
- K S Ranjitsinhji
- Rajesh Rao
- Dermot Reeve
- Albert Relf
- Ollie Robinson
- Ian Salisbury
- Phil Salt
- Ajmal Shahzad
- David Sheppard
- John Simpson
- John Snow
- Martin Speight
- Ken Suttle
- Maurice Tate
- Ian Thomson
- Joe Vine
- Alan Wells
- Colin Wells
- John Wisden
- Luke Wright
- Michael Yardy

England / Sri Lanka

- Gehan Mendis (Note: Mendis was eligible to play for either England or Sri Lanka, but did not represent either of them in international cricket.)

Greece

- Aristides Karvelas

India

- Mansoor Ali Khan Pataudi
- Piyush Chawla
- Cheteshwar Pujara
- Ishant Sharma
- Jaydev Unadkat

Ireland

- George Dockrell
- Ed Joyce (Note: Joyce has previously played International Cricket for England.)

Italy

- Grant Stewart

Namibia

- David Wiese (Note: Wiese has previously played International Cricket for South Africa.)

Netherlands

- Zach Lion-Cachet
- Michael Rippon
- Bas Zuiderent

New Zealand

- Tom Bruce
- Brendon McCullum
- Tim Seifert
- Henry Shipley
- Scott Styris
- Ross Taylor
- Lou Vincent

Pakistan

- Mushtaq Ahmed
- Mohammad Akram
- Yasir Arafat
- Naved Arif
- Faheem Ashraf
- Umar Gul
- Mir Hamza
- Imran Khan
- Javed Miandad
- Saqlain Mushtaq
- Rana Naved-ul-Hasan
- Mohammad Rizwan
- Mohammed Sami
- Ashar Zaidi

Scotland

- Brad Currie
- Matt Machan
- Calum MacLeod
- Charlie Tear
- Stuart Whittingham

South Africa

- Peter Kirsten
- Garth Le Roux
- Wayne Parnell
- Vernon Philander
- Johannes van der Wath
- Kirk Wernars
- Kepler Wessels
- Stiaan van Zyl

Sri Lanka

- Mahela Jayawardene
- Nuwan Kulasekara

West Indies (Cricket West Indies)

- Corey Collymore
- Vasbert Drakes
- Obed McCoy
- Dwayne Smith
- Franklyn Stephenson
- Jerome Taylor

Zimbabwe

- Murray Goodwin

== Records ==
Most first-class runs for Sussex
Qualification – 20,000 runs

Player	Runs
John Langridge	34,150
Ken Suttle	29,375
Jim Parks junior	29,138
James Langridge	28,894
Ted Bowley	25,439
Joseph Vine	24,120
George Cox junior	22,687
Henry Parks	21,692
Charles Fry	20,626
Thomas Cook	20,176
Alan Oakman	20,117

Most first-class wickets for Sussex
Qualification – 1,000 wickets

Player	Wickets
Maurice Tate	2,211
George Cox senior	1,810
Albert Relf	1,594
Ian Thomson	1,527
James Langridge	1,416
Fred Tate	1,306
Albert Wensley	1,067
Jim Cornford	1,019

=== Team ===
- Highest total for – 742/5d v. Somerset, Taunton, 2009
- Highest total against – 737 by Glamorgan, Hove 2023
- Lowest total for – 19 v. Surrey, Godalming, 1830, v. Nottinghamshire, Hove, 1873
- Lowest total against – 18 by Kent, Gravesend, 1867

=== Batting ===
- Highest score – 344* Murray Goodwin v. Somerset, Taunton, 2009
- Most runs in season – 2,850 J. G. Langridge, 1949

=== Highest partnership for each wicket ===
- 1st – 490 Ted Bowley and John Langridge v. Middlesex, Hove, 1933
- 2nd – 385 Ted Bowley and Maurice Tate v. Northamptonshire, Hove, 1921
- 3rd – 385* Michael Yardy and Murray Goodwin v. Warwickshire, Hove, 2006
- 4th – 363 Murray Goodwin and Carl Hopkinson v. Somerset, Taunton, 2009
- 5th – 297 Jim Parks and Harry Parks v. Hampshire, Portsmouth, 1937
- 6th – 335 Luke Wright and Ben Brown v. Durham, Hove, 2014
- 7th – 344 Ranjitsinhji and Billy Newham v. Essex, Leyton, 1902
- 8th – 291 Robin Martin-Jenkins and Mark Davis v. Somerset, Taunton, 2002
- 9th – 178 Harry Parks and Albert Wensley v. Derbyshire, Horsham, 1930
- 10th – 164 Ollie Robinson and Matt Hobden v. Durham, Chester-le-Street, 2015

=== Bowling ===
- Best bowling – 10–48 C. H. G Bland v. Kent, Tonbridge, 1899
- Best match bowling – 17–106 G. R. Cox v. Warwickshire, Horsham, 1926
- Wickets in season – 198 M. W. Tate, 1925

== Mascots ==
The main mascot of Sussex County Cricket Club is "Sid the Shark", an anthropomorphised animal that makes reference to the "Sussex Sharks" name. A female version, Sandy the Shark, has also appeared as a mascot.

== See also ==
- Cricket in Sussex
- Sport in Sussex
