= 2006 Under-19 Cricket World Cup squads =

Sixteen members of the International Cricket Council (ICC) fielded teams at the 2006 Under-19 Cricket World Cup in Sri Lanka. One team, the United States, was making its tournament debut.

== Australia ==
Coach: (Australia) Brian McFadyen

- Moises Henriques (c)
- Jackson Bird
- Tom Cooper
- Ben Cutting
- Aaron Finch
- Jon Holland
- Simon Keen
- Usman Khawaja
- Jack McNamara
- Adam Ritchard
- Will Sheridan
- Tom Stray
- Matthew Wade
- David Warner
- Rashmi Ranjan Das

Source: Sri Lanka Sports

== Bangladesh ==
Coach: (Australia) Allister de Winter

- Mushfiqur Rahim (c)
- Dolar Mahmud
- Ishraq Sonet
- Kazi Kamrul Islam
- Mehdi Hasan Maruf
- Mehrab Hossain
- Nabil Samad
- Raqibul Hasan
- Rezaul Islam
- Shakib Al Hasan
- Shamsur Rahman
- Sirajullah Khadim
- Suhrawadi Shuvo
- Tamim Iqbal

Source: Sri Lanka Sports

== England ==
Coach: (England) Andy Pick

- Moeen Ali
- Varun Chopra
- Rory Hamilton-Brown
- Nicholas James
- Andrew Miller
- Steven Mullaney
- Mark Nelson
- John Simpson
- Mark Stoneman
- Huw Waters
- Graeme White
- Greg Wood
- Robert Woodman
- Ben Wright

Source: Sri Lanka Sports

== India ==
Coach: (India) Venkatesh Prasad

- Ravikant Shukla (c)
- Piyush Chawla
- Cheteshwar Pujara
- Rohit Sharma
- Mayank Tehlan
- Debabrata Das
- Pinal Shah
- Abu Nechim
- Ravindra Jadeja
- Shahbaz Nadeem
- Monish Parmar
- Saurabh Bandekar
- Gaurav Dhiman
- Vijaykumar Yo Mahesh

Source: Sri Lanka Sports

== Ireland ==
Coach: (South Africa) Adrian Birrell

- Eoin Morgan (c)
- Neil Gill
- James Hall
- Richard Keaveney
- Gary Kidd
- Fintan McAllister
- Niall McDarby
- Gareth McKee
- Gavin McKenna
- Andrew Poynter
- David Rankin
- Richard Stirling
- Greg Thompson
- Gary Wilson

Source: Sri Lanka Sports

== Namibia ==
Coach: (Zimbabwe) Andy Waller

- Stephanus Ackermann (c)
- Jason Bandlow
- Dawid Botha
- Morne Engelbrecht
- Pieter Grove
- Andrew Louw
- Floris Marx
- Hendrik Marx
- Marc Olivier
- Henno Prinsloo
- Nicolaas Scholtz
- Ewaid Steenkamp
- Keady Strauss
- Louis van der Westhuizen

Source: Sri Lanka Sports

== Nepal ==
Coach: (Sri Lanka) Roy Dias

- Bantu Bataju
- Amrit Bhattarai
- Prem Chaudhary
- Kanishka Chaugai
- Mahesh Chhetri
- Sashi Kesari
- Paras Khadka
- Gyanendra Malla
- Abhaya Rana
- Ratan Rauniyar
- Basanta Regmi
- Raj Shrestha
- Yashwant Subedi
- Sharad Vesawker

Source: Sri Lanka Sports

== New Zealand ==
Coach: (New Zealand) Dipak Patel

- Marc Ellison (c)
- Todd Astle
- Dean Bartlett
- Hamish Bennett
- Andrew de Boorder
- Jason Donnelly
- Nicolas Fitzgerald
- Shaun Fitzgibbon
- Martin Guptill
- Roneel Hira
- Ronald Karaitiana
- Colin Munro
- Kieran Noema-Barnett
- Tim Southee

Source: Sri Lanka Sports

== Pakistan ==
Coach: (Pakistan) Mansoor Rana

- Sarfraz Ahmed (c)
- Akhtar Ayub
- Fahad Mengal
- Ali Khan
- Anwar Ali
- Imad Wasim
- Jamshed Ahmed
- Mohammad Faheem
- Mohammad Ibrahim
- Mohammad Laeeq
- Nasir Jamshed
- Rameez Raja
- Riaz Kail

Source: Sri Lanka Sports

== Scotland ==
Coach: (Australia) Peter Drinnen

- Kasiam Farid (c)
- Richie Berrington
- David Bill
- Tyler Buchan
- Robert Cannon
- Gordon Goudie
- Andrew Hislop
- Moneeb Iqbal
- Scott MacLennan
- Calum MacLeod
- Aamir Mehmond
- Umair Mohammed
- Rajeev Routray
- Sean Weeraratna

Source: Sri Lanka Sports

== South Africa ==
Coach: (South Africa) Russell Domingo

- Dean Elgar (c)
- Craig Alexander
- Pieter Daneel
- Richard das Neves
- Craig Kieswetter
- Richard Levi
- Grant Mokoena
- Wayne Parnell
- Romano Ramoo
- Mafinki Serame
- Mthokozisi Shezi
- Malusi Siboto
- Jean Symes
- Brett Thompson

Source: Sri Lanka Sports

== Sri Lanka ==
Coach: (Sri Lanka) Sumithra Warnakulasuriya

- Dilhan Cooray
- Sameera de Zoysa
- Hans Fernando
- Chathupama Gunasinghe
- Dimuth Karunaratne
- Shalika Karunanayake
- Angelo Mathews
- Sachith Pathirana
- Prabuddha Perera
- Thisara Perera
- Ashan Priyanjan
- Malinda Pushpakumara
- Sachithra Serasinghe
- Rajeewa Weerasinghe

Source: Sri Lanka Sports

== Uganda ==
- Hamza Almuzahim
- Davis Arinaitwe
- Emmanuel Isaneez
- Arthur Kyobe
- Roger Mukasa
- Dennis Musali
- Emmanuel Nakaana
- Patrick Ochan
- Jimmy Okello
- Raymond Otim
- Danniel Ruyange
- Mauneek Solanki
- Ronald Ssemanda
- Charles Waiswa

Source: Sri Lanka Sports

== United States ==
Coach: (Trinidad and Tobago) Larry Gomes

- Hemant Punoo (c)
- Dominic Audain
- Sumon Bari
- Romeno Deane
- Anil Deopersaud
- Akeem Dodson
- Alexandrino Kirton
- Dunae Nathaniel
- Mrunal Patel
- Nisarg Patel
- Abhimanyu Rajp
- Kumar Ramsabad
- Mohammad Rehman
- Ravi Timbawala

Source: Sri Lanka Sports

== West Indies ==
Coach: (Barbados) Roddy Estwick

- Leon Johnson (c)
- Rishi Bachan
- Shamarh Brooks
- Andre Fletcher
- Jason Mohammed
- Andre McCarthy
- Sunil Narine
- Nelon Pascal
- William Perkins
- Kieron Pollard
- Richard Ramdeen
- Kemar Roach
- Javon Searles
- Gajanand Singh

Source: Sri Lanka Sports

== Zimbabwe ==
Coach: (Zimbabwe) Walter Chawaguta

- Sean Williams
- Gary Ballance
- Ronald Benade
- Chamu Chibhabha
- Graeme Cremer
- Ryan Higgins
- Friday Kasteni
- Tarisai Mahlunge
- Prince Masvaure
- Keagan Meth
- Taurai Muzarabani
- Ian Nicolson
- Glen Querl
- Donald Samunderu

Source: Sri Lanka Sports

== Sources ==
- Team averages, ICC Under-19 World Cup 2005/06 – CricketArchive
- Statistics, ICC Under-19 World Cup 2005/06 – ESPNcricinfo
