= 2009 Friends Provident Trophy =

- Administrator: England and Wales Cricket Board
- Cricket format: Limited overs cricket (50 overs)
- Tournament format(s): Group stage and knockout
- Champions: Hampshire Hawks (3rd title)
- Participants: 20
- Matches: 71 (+16 no results)
- Most runs: 546 Ed Joyce (Sussex Sharks)
- Most wickets: 20 Chris Schofield (Surrey Brown Caps); 20 Dominic Cork (Hampshire Hawks); 20 Alfonso Thomas (Somerset Sabres)
- Official website: Friends Provident cricket

The 2009 Friends Provident Trophy was an English county cricket tournament held between 19 April and 25 July 2009. The competition was won by Hampshire Hawks who beat the Sussex Sharks by 6 wickets at Lord's.

== Format ==
The eighteen first-class counties, joined by the Scottish and Irish national teams were divided into four groups. Each team plays each other twice, with the top two teams from each group progressing to the quarter-final stage. Group winners gain a home draw for the quarter-final. During the group stage, teams are awarded two points for a win, one point for a tie, abandonment or a no result, with no points awarded for a defeat. Teams level on points at the end of the group stage were separated by most wins, followed by results between the two teams, net run rate, followed by most wickets taken per balls bowled in matches achieving a result. Teams that were victorious in the quarter-finals then proceeded to the semi-finals and winners from the semi-finals progressed to the final which was held on 25 July, at Lord's.

== Fixtures ==
=== Group A ===
Team	Pld	W	T	L	NR	Pts	NRR
Hampshire Hawks	8	5	0	2	1	11	+0.339
Nottinghamshire Outlaws	8	5	0	3	0	10	+0.420
Worcestershire Royals	8	4	0	3	1	9	+0.289
Leicestershire Foxes	8	2	0	4	2	6	−0.640
Ireland	8	1	0	5	2	4	−0.746

19 April 2009
(scorecard)

Worcestershire Royals; 320/8 (50 overs)	v	Hampshire Hawks; 267 (48.1 overs)
Moeen Ali 125 (109); Chris Tremlett 3/76 (10 overs)		John Crawley 100 (117); Gareth Batty 5/35 (10 overs)

Worcestershire won by 53 runs
Rose Bowl, Southampton
Umpires: Nigel Llong & David Millns
Player of the match: Moeen Ali (Worcestershire)

19 April 2009
(scorecard)

Leicestershire Foxes; 155 (45.4 overs)	v	Nottinghamshire Outlaws; 159/2 (30 overs)
James Taylor 44* (97); Graeme Swann 3/24 (8.4 overs)		Mark Wagh 68* (83); Andrew Harris 1/25 (5 overs)

Nottinghamshire won by 8 wickets
Trent Bridge, Nottingham
Umpires: John Steele & Peter Willey
Player of the match: Mark Wagh (Nottinghamshire)

26 April 2009
(scorecard)

Worcestershire Royals; 180/8 (33 overs)	v	Ireland; 128/9 (33 overs)
Steven Davies 47 (72); Kyle McCallan 3/26 (7 overs)		Paul Stirling 51 (73); Daryl Mitchell 2/7 (2 overs)

Worcestershire won by 52 runs
Civil Service Cricket Club, Stormont, Belfast
Umpires: Martin Bodenham & Jeremy Lloyds
Player of the match: Kyle McCallan (Ireland)

- Match was reduced before play started to 33 overs per side.

26 April 2009
(scorecard)

Leicestershire Foxes; 238/6 (50 overs)	v	Hampshire Hawks; 242/6 (48.1 overs)
Matthew Boyce 80 (104); Liam Dawson 4/48 (10 overs)		Chris Benham 79 (100); Iain O'Brien 2/32 (9.1 overs)

Hampshire won by 4 wickets
Grace Road, Leicester
Umpires: Rob Bailey & Nigel Cowley
Player of the match: Chris Benham (Hampshire)

3 May 2009
(scorecard)

Hampshire Hawks; 300/5 (50 overs)	v	Leicestershire Foxes; 254 all out (49.2 overs)
Chris Benham 108* (103); Carl Crowe 2/36 (10 overs)		Paul Nixon 50 (74); Billy Taylor 3/46 (10 overs)

Hampshire won by 46 runs
Rose Bowl, Southampton
Umpires: Barry Dudleston & George Sharp
Player of the match: Chris Benham (Hampshire)

3 May 2009
(scorecard)

Nottinghamshire Outlaws; 346/9 (50 overs)	v	Ireland; 212/9 (50 overs)
Alex Hales 106 (92); Peter Connell 4/71 (10 overs)		Andrew White 50 (57); Mark Ealham 4/40 (9 overs)

Nottinghamshire won by 134 runs
Trent Bridge, Nottingham
Umpires: Michael Gough & Nigel Llong
Player of the match: Alex Hales (Nottinghamshire)

4 May 2009
(scorecard)

Ireland; 197/5 (50 overs)	v	Leicestershire Foxes; 201/3 (29 overs)
Paul Stirling 80 (82); Iain O'Brien 2/36 (7 overs)		Hylton Ackerman 118* (87); Kyle McCallan 2/29 (5 overs)

Leicestershire won by 7 wickets
Grace Road, Leicester
Umpires: Jeff Evans & Trevor Jesty
Player of the match: Hylton Ackerman (Leicestershire)

4 May 2009
(scorecard)

Nottinghamshire Outlaws; 188/8 (40 overs)	v	Worcestershire Royals; 138/0 (23.1 overs)
Mark Wagh 85 (110); Ashley Noffke 3/37 (8 overs)		Steven Davies 82* (59)

Worcestershire won by 10 wickets (D/L)
County Ground, New Road, Worcester
Umpires: Rob Bailey & John Steele
Player of the match: Steven Davies (Worcestershire)

- Match was reduced before play started to 43 overs per side. Nottinghamshire innings was reduced to 40 overs. Worcestershire target was 138 runs in 26 overs.

10 May 2009
(scorecard)

Ireland	v	Hampshire Hawks

Match abandoned without a ball bowled
Woodvale Road, Eglinton
Umpires: Michael Gough & Vanburn Holder

10 May 2009
(scorecard)

Worcestershire Royals; 209/8 (50 overs)	v	Nottinghamshire Outlaws; 211/6 (44.3 overs)
Daryl Mitchell 59 (55); Andre Adams 2/33 (9 overs)		Mark Wagh 52 (69); Chris Whelan 2/37 (5 overs)

Nottinghamshire won by 4 wickets
Trent Bridge, Nottingham
Umpires: Martin Bodenham & Trevor Jesty
Player of the match: Samit Patel (Nottinghamshire)

12 May 2009
(scorecard)

Nottinghamshire Outlaws; 202 all out (49.1 overs)	v	Hampshire Hawks; 203/4 (43.2 overs)
Will Jefferson 93 (113); Dimitri Mascarenhas 4/39 (10 overs)		Michael Lumb 57 (63); Ryan Sidebottom 2/39 (10 overs)

Hampshire won by 6 wickets
Rose Bowl, Southampton
Umpires: Steve Garratt & Tim Robinson
Player of the match: Will Jefferson (Nottinghamshire)

12 May 2009
(scorecard)

Leicestershire Foxes; 282/3 (50 overs)	v	Worcestershire Royals; 264 all out (48.2 overs)
James Taylor 101 (109); Matthew Mason 1/41 (10 overs)		Steven Davies 62 (46); Claude Henderson 3/44 (10 overs)

Leicestershire won by 18 runs
County Ground, New Road, Worcester
Umpires: Nick Cook & Peter Willey
Player of the match: James Taylor (Leicestershire)

14 May 2009
(scorecard)

Ireland	v	Leicestershire Foxes

Match abandoned without a ball bowled
Castle Avenue, Dublin
Umpires: Richard Illingworth & George Sharp

14 May 2009
(scorecard)

Worcestershire Royals; 246/8 (50 overs)	v	Hampshire Hawks; 138 all out (38.5 overs)
Steven Davies 34 (22); Billy Taylor 3/37 (10 overs)		Chris Benham 42 (74); Chris Whelan 4/27 (6.5 overs)

Worcestershire won by 108 runs
County Ground, New Road, Worcester
Umpires: Nigel Llong & Peter Willey
Player of the match: Matthew Mason (Worcestershire)

16 May 2009
(scorecard)

Ireland; 140/8 (34 overs)	v	Nottinghamshire Outlaws; 141/8 (33.5 overs)
Reinhardt Strydom 27 (46); Samit Patel 6/13 (7 overs)		Ali Brown 32 (47); Kyle McCallan 2/20 (7 overs)

Nottinghamshire won by 2 wickets
Castle Avenue, Dublin
Umpires: Nigel Cowley & Steve Garratt
Player of the match: Samit Patel (Nottinghamshire

- The match was reduced before play started to 34 overs per side.

18 May 2009
(scorecard)

Hampshire Hawks; 316/2 (50 overs)	v	Ireland; 239/9 (50 overs)
Sean Ervine 167* (140); Peter Connell 1/60 (9 overs)		Kevin O'Brien 94 (75); Dominic Cork 4/20 (10 overs)

Hampshire won by 77 runs
Rose Bowl, Southampton
Umpires: Rob Bailey
Player of the match: Sean Ervine (Hampshire)

19 May 2009
(scorecard)

Nottinghamshire Outlaws; 149/3 (35.3 overs)	v	Leicestershire Foxes; 67/5 (10 overs)
Samit Patel 48 (69); Iain O'Brien 2/38 (6.3 overs)		James Taylor 18 (12); Darren Pattinson 2/19 (2 overs)

Nottinghamshire won by 9 runs (D/L)
Grace Road, Leicester
Umpires: Martin Bodenham & John Steele
Player of the match: Samit Patel (Nottinghamshire)

- Nottinghamshire innings was reduced to 35.3 overs, Leicestershire target was 77 runs in 10 overs.

20 May 2009
(scorecard)

Nottinghamshire Outlaws; 145 all out (46.1 overs)	v	Hampshire Hawks; 149/0 (29.1 overs)
Mark Ealham 33 (37); Dominic Cork 4/18 (7.1 overs)		James Adams 73 (90)

Hampshire won by 10 wickets
Trent Bridge, Nottingham
Umpires: Vanburn Holder & Richard Illingworth
Player of the match: Dominic Cork (Hampshire)

20 May 2009
(scorecard)

Ireland; 152 all out (48.5 overs)	v	Worcestershire Royals; 58 all out (20.3 overs)
Kyle McCallan 40 (60); Chris Whelan 3/22		Daryl Mitchell 15 (36); Peter Connell 5/19

Ireland won by 94 runs
County Ground, New Road, Worcester
Umpires: Michael Gough & Neil Mallender
Player of the match: Peter Connell (Ireland)

=== Group B ===
Team	Pld	W	T	L	NR	Pts	NRR
Somerset Sabres	8	7	0	0	1	15	+2.001
Middlesex Panthers	8	4	0	4	0	8	+0.137
Warwickshire Bears	8	3	1	3	1	8	+0.468
Kent Spitfires	8	3	1	4	0	7	−0.409
Scottish Saltires	8	1	0	7	0	2	−1.783

19 April 2009
(scorecard)

Warwickshire Bears; 271/9 (50 overs)	v	Somerset Sabres; 272/2 (46 overs)
Ian Bell 108 (123); Zander de Bruyn 3/30 (10 overs)		Craig Kieswetter 138* (131); Chris Woakes 1/39 (7 overs)

Somerset won by 8 wickets
Edgbaston, Birmingham
Umpires: Rob Bailey & Ian Gould
Player of the match: Zander de Bruyn (Somerset)

26 April 2009
(scorecard)

Middlesex Panthers; 302/7 (50 overs)	v	Scottish Saltires; 140 all out (37.1 overs)
Billy Godleman 82 (85); Dewald Nel 3/62 (9 overs)		Kyle Coetzer 45 (59); Steven Finn 2/21 (6 overs)

Middlesex won by 162 runs
Lord's, London
Umpires: Steve Garratt & Ian Gould
Player of the match: Billy Godleman (Middlesex)

26 April 2009
(scorecard)

Somerset Sabres; 291/3 (50 overs)	v	Kent Spitfires; 181 all out (33.1 overs)
Peter Trego 73* (36); Robert Ferley 2/46 (8 overs)		Geraint Jones 43* (46); Alfonso Thomas 3/38 (7 overs)

Somerset won by 110 runs
County Ground, Taunton
Umpires: Neil Bainton & John Holder
Player of the match: Peter Trego (Somerset)

3 May 2009
(scorecard)

Middlesex Panthers; 133 all out (36.4 overs)	v	Kent Spitfires; 137/4 (37.2 overs)
Ben Scott 29* (50); James Tredwell 6/27 (10 overs)		Darren Stevens 37* (62); Dawid Malan 2/37 (6 overs)

Kent won by 6 wickets
John Walker's Ground, Southgate
Umpires: Peter Hartley & Richard Kettleborough
Player of the match: James Tredwell (Kent)

3 May 2009
(scorecard)

Scottish Saltires; 182 all out (48.3 overs)	v	Warwickshire Bears; 183/3 (30.4 overs)
Cameron Borgas 59 (83); Boyd Rankin 2/20 (8 overs)		Neil Carter 65 (38); Sean Weeraratna 2/32 (5 overs)

Warwickshire won by 7 wickets
Edgbaston, Birmingham
Umpires: Rob Bailey & Jeff Evans
Player of the match: Neil Carter (Warwickshire)

4 May 2009
(scorecard)

Scottish Saltires; 227/7 (50 overs)	v	Kent Spitfires; 206/6 (42.4 overs)
Cameron Borgas 65 (74); Robbie Joseph 3/55 (10 overs)		Joe Denly 97 (129); Ryan Watson 2/29 (6.2 overs)

Kent won by 4 wickets
St Lawrence Ground, Canterbury
Umpires: Keith Coburn & Richard Illingworth
Player of the match: Joe Denly (Kent)

- Kent target was 206 runs in 44 overs.

4 May 2009
(scorecard)

Middlesex Panthers; 65 all out (24.1 overs)	v	Somerset Sabres; 66/2 (8.3 overs)
Gareth Berg 30 (42); Peter Trego 4/17 (10 overs)		Craig Kieswetter 36* (21); Steven Finn 1/11 (1.3 overs)

Somerset won by 8 wickets
Recreation Ground, Bath
Umpires: Barry Dudleston & Nick Cook
Player of the match: Peter Trego (Somerset)

10 May 2009
(scorecard)

Warwickshire Bears; 218 all out (49.2 overs)	v	Kent Spitfires; 219/6 (41.5 overs)
Jim Troughton 62 (59); Wayne Parnell 3/27 (9 overs)		Joe Denly 49 (62); Ant Botha 2/47 (7.5 overs)

Kent won by 4 wickets
St Lawrence Ground, Canterbury
Umpires: Jeremy Lloyds & Peter Willey
Player of the match: Wayne Parnell (Kent)

11 May 2009
(scorecard)

Middlesex Panthers; 322/5 (50 overs)	v	Kent Spitfires; 242 all out (45.4 overs)
Eoin Morgan 161 (136); Azhar Mahmood 2/51 (10 overs)		Justin Kemp 69 (71); Chris Silverwood 3/26 (8 overs)

Middlesex won by 80 runs
St Lawrence Ground, Canterbury
Umpires: Tim Robinson & John Steele
Player of the match: Eoin Morgan (Middlesex)

11 May 2009
(scorecard)

Somerset Sabres; 403/3 (50 overs)	v	Scottish Saltires; 252/9 (50 overs)
James Hildreth 151 (141); Matthew Parker 1/57 (6 overs)		Ryan Watson 67 (80); Peter Trego 3/43 (10 overs)

Somerset won by 151 runs
County Ground, Taunton
Umpires: Barry Dudleston & Nigel Llong
Player of the match: Marcus Trescothick & James Hildreth (both Somerset)

12 May 2009
(scorecard)

Middlesex Panthers; 165 all out (47.3 overs)	v	Warwickshire Panthers; 166/4 (35.4 overs)
Eoin Morgan 62 (110); Neil Carter 3/40 (9 overs)		Ian Bell 60* (82); Steven Finn 1/21 (6 overs)

Warwickshire won by 6 wickets
Edgbaston, Birmingham
Umpires: Nigel Cowley & Peter Hartley
Player of the match: Neil Carter (Warwickshire)

14 May 2009
(scorecard)

Middlesex Panthers; 280/4 (50 overs)	v	Scottish Saltires; 142 all out (34.3 overs)
Shaun Udal 79* (46); Glenn Rogers 2/55 (10 overs)		Ryan Watson 47 (61); Shaun Udal 3/32 (7 overs)

Middlesex won by 138 runs
The Grange, Edinburgh
Umpires: Vanburn Holder & Richard Kettleborough
Player of the match: Shaun Udal (Middlesex)

14 May 2009
(scorecard)

Somerset Sabres; 135/2 (22 overs)	v	Warwickshire Bears
Marcus Trescothick 84* (69); Ant Botha 1/2 (1 overs)

No result
County Ground, Taunton
Umpires: Martin Bodenham & Barry Dudleston

16 May 2009
(scorecard)

Warwickshire Bears; 242/6 (50 overs)	v	Scottish Saltires; 187 all out (43.4 overs)
Jim Troughton 77 (125); Craig Wright 2/28 (10 overs)		Cameron Borgas 35 (84); Keith Barker 2/21 (6.4 overs)

Warwickshire won by 50 runs (D/L)
The Grange, Edinburgh
Umpires: Nick Cook & Richard Kettleborough
Player of the match: Jim Troughton (Warwickshire)

- Scotland target was 238 runs in 48 overs.

16 May 2009
(scorecard)

Somerset Sabres; 296 all out (50 overs)	v	Kent Spitfires; 251/9 (50 overs)
Justin Langer 77 (60); Simon Cook 3/29 (10 overs)		Martin van Jaarsveld 132* (125); Peter Trego 4/56 (10 overs)

Somerset won by 45 runs
St Lawrence Ground, Canterbury
Umpires: Neil Mallender & David Millns
Player of the match: Martin van Jaarsveld (Kent)

17 May 2009
(scorecard)

Middlesex Panthers; 341/7 (50 overs)	v	Somerset Sabres; 293/5 (39.1 overs)
Phillip Hughes 119 (125); Peter Trego 4/65 (10 overs)		Justin Langer 78* (69); Steven Finn 3/67 (7.1 overs)

Somerset won by 5 wickets (D/L)
Lord's, London
Umpires: Michael Gough & Peter Willey
Player of the match: Justin Langer (Somerset)

18 May 2009
(scorecard)

Kent Spitfires; 65/4 (19.5 overs)	v	Scottish Saltires; 80/1 (14.5 overs)
Geraint Jones 18 (33); Sean Weeraratna 2/14 (5 overs)		Fraser Watts 45 (38); Simon Cook 1/29 (4 overs)

Scotland won by 9 wickets (D/L)
The Grange, Edinburgh
Umpires: John Holder & Tim Robinson
Player of the match: Fraser Watts (Scotland)

- Match was reduced before play started to 37 overs per side. Kent innings was reduced to 19.5 overs. Scotland target was 77 runs in 18 overs.

18 May 2009
(scorecard)

Warwickshire Bears; 276/7 (50 overs)	v	Middlesex Panthers; 278/6 (50 overs)
Jonathan Trott 120 (142); Gareth Berg 2/49 (10 overs)		Neil Dexter 69* (90); Ant Botha 3/47 (9 overs)

Middlesex won by 4 wickets
Lord's, London
Umpires: Neil Mallender & John Steele
Player of the match: Neil Dexter (Middlesex)

20 May 2009
(scorecard)

Somerset Sabres; 220/8 (50 overs)	v	Scottish Saltires; 183 all out (46.2 overs)
Arul Suppiah 48 (80); Jan Stander 3/45 (10 overs)		Cameron Borgas 78* (106); Alfonso Thomas 4/22 (8 overs)

Somerset won by 37 runs
The Grange, Edinburgh
Umpires: John Holder & Tim Robinson
Player of the match: Alfonso Thomas (Somerset)

20 May 2009
(scorecard)

Kent Spitfires; 265 all out (49.2 overs)	v	Warwickshire Bears; 241/6 (46.5 overs)
Joe Denly 115 (128); Steffan Piolet 3/53 (10 overs)		Jim Troughton 67 (88); Simon Cook 4/37 (10 overs)

Match tied (D/L)
Edgbaston, Birmingham
Umpires: Nigel Cowley & Jeff Evans
Player of the match: Joe Denly (Kent)

- When play was halted Warwickshire needed to have scored 242 runs to win.

=== Group C ===
Team	Pld	W	T	L	NR	Pts	NRR
Gloucestershire Gladiators	8	5	0	2	1	11	+0.449
Sussex Sharks	8	4	0	3	1	9	+0.120
Yorkshire Carnegie	8	4	0	4	0	8	+0.150
Surrey Brown Caps	8	3	0	5	0	6	+0.302
Durham Dynamos	8	3	0	5	0	6	−0.633

19 April 2009
(scorecard)

Yorkshire Carnegie; 268/7 (50 overs)	v	Durham Dynamos; 188 all out (41 overs)
Jacques Rudolph 73 (101); Callum Thorp 2/47 (10 overs)		Dale Benkenstein 68 (83); Deon Kruis 3/28 (10 overs)

Yorkshire won by 80 runs
Riverside Ground, Chester-le-Street
Umpires: Neil Bainton & Jeremy Lloyds
Player of the match: Gerard Brophy (Yorkshire)

19 April 2009
(scorecard)

Sussex Sharks; 227 all out (49.5 overs)	v	Gloucestershire Gladiators; 228/3 (46.2 overs)
Michael Yardy 58 (68); Vikram Banerjee 3/47 (10 overs)		Craig Spearman 69* (100); Robin Martin-Jenkins 1/35 (8 overs)

Gloucestershire won by 7 wickets
County Ground, Bristol
Umpires: Richard Kettleborough & Tim Robinson
Player of the match: Chris Taylor (Gloucestershire)

26 April 2009
(scorecard)

Gloucestershire Gladiators; 268/9 (50 overs)	v	Surrey Brown Caps; 140 all out (38.2 overs)
William Porterfield 74 (84); André Nel 3/39 (10 overs)		Usman Afzaal 36 (59); Ian Saxelby 4/31 (7.2 overs)

Gloucestershire won by 128 runs
County Ground, Bristol
Umpires: Peter Hartley & Neil Mallender
Player of the match: Chris Taylor (Gloucestershire)

26 April 2009
(scorecard)

Yorkshire Carnegie; 227/5 (50 overs)	v	Sussex Sharks; 213 all out (48.4 overs)
Michael Vaughan 82 (116); Robin Martin-Jenkins 3/49 (9 overs)		Luke Wright 46 (75); Tim Bresnan 4/35 (10 overs)

Yorkshire won by 14 runs
Headingley, Leeds
Umpires: Vanburn Holder & Richard Kettleborough
Player of the match: Gerard Brophy (Yorkshire)

3 May 2009
(scorecard)

Durham Dynamos; 266/7 (50 overs)	v	Surrey Brown Caps; 265/6 (50 overs)
Dale Benkenstein 77* (80); Chris Schofield 2/28 (10 overs)		Mark Ramprakash 109* (105); Ian Blackwell 3/43 (10 overs)

Durham won by 1 run
Riverside Ground, Chester-le-Street
Umpires: Steve Garratt & Vanburn Holder
Player of the match: Mark Ramprakash (Surrey)

3 May 2009
(scorecard)

Gloucestershire Gladiators; 269 all out (49 overs)	v	Yorkshire Carnegie; 241/8 (50 overs)
Craig Spearman 92 (71); Rich Pyrah 4/54 (9 overs)		Jacques Rudolph 118 (139); Jon Lewis 3/46 (10 overs)

Gloucestershire won by 28 runs
Headingley, Leeds
Umpires: John Holder & David Millns
Player of the match: Craig Spearman (Gloucestershire)

4 May 2009
(scorecard)

Durham Dynamos; 192 all out (48.2 overs)	v	Sussex Sharks; 193/2 (43.2 overs)
Will Smith 65 (105); Rory Hamilton-Brown 3/37 (8.2 overs)		Ed Joyce 103* (124); Mitchell Claydon 1/26 (6 overs)

Sussex won by 8 wickets
Riverside Ground, Chester-le-Street
Umpires: Steve Garratt & Vanburn Holder
Player of the match: Ed Joyce (Sussex)

4 May 2009
(scorecard)

Surrey Brown Caps; 184/7 (47 overs)	v	Yorkshire Carnegie; 104 all out (30.2 overs)
Matthew Spriegel 56* (90); Ajmal Shahzad 2/29 (9 overs)		Rana Naved-ul-Hasan 49 (56); Grant Elliott 4/14 (5 overs)

Surrey won by 63 runs
Headingley, Leeds
Umpires: Ian Gould & Tim Robinson
Player of the match: Chris Schofield (Surrey)

10 May 2009
(scorecard)

Gloucestershire Gladiators; 301/8 (50 overs)	v	Durham Dynamos; 153 all out (40.3 overs)
Chris Taylor 71 (71); Mitchell Claydon 2/61 (10 overs)		Gareth Breese 47 (85); Anthony Ireland 3/12 (5 overs)

Gloucestershire won by 148 runs
County Ground, Bristol
Umpires: Barry Dudleston & Richard Kettleborough
Player of the match: Chris Taylor (Gloucestershire)

10 May 2009
(scorecard)

Sussex Sharks; 313/7 (50 overs)	v	Surrey Brown Caps; 311/6 (50 overs)
Murray Goodwin 144 (119); Pedro Collins 3/56 (9 overs)		Scott Newman 130 (126); Yasir Arafat 2/52 (10 overs)

Sussex won by 2 runs
County Ground, Hove
Umpires: Nigel Cowley & John Holder
Player of the match: Murray Goodwin (Sussex)

11 May 2009
(scorecard)

Yorkshire Carnegie; 217/9 (50 overs)	v	Gloucestershire Gladiators; 221/7 (49.2 overs)
Anthony McGrath 67 (98); Jon Lewis 4/43 (9 overs)		Stephen Adshead 56 (57); David Wainwright 3/33 (8 overs)

Gloucestershire won by 3 wickets
County Ground, Bristol
Umpires: Neil Bainton & Peter Hartley
Player of the match: James Franklin (Gloucestershire)

11 May 2009
(scorecard)

Sussex Sharks; 313/6 (50 overs)	v	Durham Dynamos; 257 all out (46.5 overs)
Ed Joyce 127 (125); Ian Blackwell 2/60 (10 overs)		Philip Mustard 92 (92); James Kirtley 6/50 (8.5 overs)

Suussex won by 56 runs
County Ground, Hove
Umpires: Rob Bailey & David Millns
Player of the match: James Kirtley (Sussex)

13 May 2009
(scorecard)

Surrey Brown Caps; 306/6 (50 overs)	v	Gloucestershire Gladiators; 142 all out (33.3 overs)
Mark Ramprakash 121 (124); James Franklin 2/56 (10 overs)		William Porterfield 42 (43); Usman Afzaal 2/2 (1.3 overs)

Surrey won by 164 runs
The Oval, London
Umpires: Jeff Evans & John Steele
Player of the match: Mark Ramprakash (Surrey)

13 May 2009
(scorecard)

Durham Dynamos; 166 all out (49.3 overs)	v	Yorkshire Carnegie; 167/8 (49.2 overs)
Gordon Muchall 31 (45); Rich Pyrah 3/23 (7 overs)		Joe Sayers 51 (109); Ian Blackwell 3/26 (10 overs)

Yorkshire won by 2 wickets
Headingley, Leeds
Umpires: Keith Coburn & Nigel Llong
Player of the match: Rich Pyrah (Yorkshire)

15 May 2009
(scorecard)

Durham Dynamos; 287/4 (50 overs)	v	Surrey Brown Caps; 227 all out (47.2 overs)
Will Smith 77 (99); Chris Schofield 2/57 (10 overs)		Usman Afzaal 58 (66); Gareth Breese 3/42 (10 overs)

Durham won by 60 runs
The Oval, London
Umpires: Trevor Jesty & David Millns
Player of the match: Will Smith (Durham)

15 May 2009
(scorecard)

Gloucestershire Gladiators; 306/9 (50 overs)	v	Sussex Sharks
Craig Spearman 67 (52); William Beer 2/40 (8 overs)

No result
County Ground, Hove
Umpires: Jeff Evans & Michael Gough

18 May 2009
(scorecard)

Sussex Sharks; 269/7 (50 overs)	v	Yorkshire Carnegie; 209 all out (47.3 overs)
Michael Yardy 68 (82); Rich Pyrah 3/65 (10 overs)		Michael Vaughan 66 (85); Christopher Nash 4/40 (9.3 overs)

Sussex won by 60 runs
County Ground, Hove
Umpires: Barry Dudleston & Trevor Jesty
Player of the match: Michael Yardy (Sussex)

19 May 2009
(scorecard)

Surrey Brown Caps; 241/7 (39 overs)	v	Sussex Sharks; 162 all out (30 overs)
Mark Ramprakash 102 (94); Yasir Arafat 2/45 (8 overs)		Chad Keegan 38 (38); Chris Schofield 5/32 (8 overs)

Surrey won by 79 runs (D/L)
The Oval, London
Umpires: Barry Dudleston & Steve Garratt
Player of the match: Mark Ramprakash (Surrey)

- Match was reduced to 39 overs per side. Sussex target was 242 runs.

20 May 2009
(scorecard)

Gloucestershire Gladiators; 254/8 (50 overs)	v	Durham Dynamos; 255/6 (48.1 overs)
Stephen Adshead 87 (92); Neil Killeen 5/48 (10 overs)		Ian Blackwell 64 (67); Vikram Banerjee 3/60 (10 overs)

Durham won by 4 wickets
Riverside Ground, Chester-le-Street
Umpires: Neil Bainton & Nick Cook
Player of the match: Neil Killeen (Durham)

20 May 2009
(scorecard)

Surrey Brown Caps; 329/8 (50 overs)	v	Yorkshire Carnegie; 330/6 (49.4 overs)
Scott Newman 177 (156); Deon Kruis 3/24 (8 overs)		Adam Lyth 83 (72); Usman Afzaal 2/34 (7 overs)

Yorkshire won by 4 wickets
The Oval, London
Umpires: Barry Dudleston & Jeremy Lloyds
Player of the match: Scott Newman (Surrey)

=== Group D ===
Team	Pld	W	T	L	NR	Pts	NRR
Lancashire Lightning	8	6	0	2	0	12	+0.635
Essex Eagles	8	5	0	2	1	11	+0.413
Derbyshire Phantoms	8	3	0	4	1	7	−0.298
Glamorgan Dragons	8	2	0	5	1	5	−0.779
Northamptonshire Steelbacks	8	1	0	4	3	5	−0.160

19 April 2009
(scorecard)

Northamptonshire Steelbacks; 281 (50 overs)	v	Essex Eagles; 282/3 (48.2 overs)
Steven Crook 72 (53); Grant Flower 2/31 (8 overs)		Varun Chopra 76 (98); David Lucas 1/33 (5 overs)

Essex won by 7 wickets
County Ground, Chelmsford
Umpires: Peter Hartley & George Sharp
Player of the match: Varun Chopra (Essex)

19 April 2009
(scorecard)

Lancashire Lightning; 241/6 (50 overs)	v	Glamorgan Dragons; 161 all out (40.2 overs)
Francois du Plessis 66 (72); David Harrison 3/44 (9 overs)		Mark Wallace 60 (61); Sajid Mahmood 3/17 (7.2 overs)

Lancashire won by 80 runs
Old Trafford, Manchester
Umpires: Nick Cook & Jeff Evans
Player of the match: Tom Smith (Lancashire)

26 April 2009
(scorecard)

Glamorgan Dragons; 205/9 (50 overs)	v	Derbyshire Phantoms; 206/6 (46 overs)
Jamie Dalrymple 75* (102); Tim Groenewald 3/33 (8 overs)		Dan Redfern 53 (59); Jamie Dalrymple 2/27 (10 overs)

Derbyshire won by 4 wickets
County Ground, Derby
Umpires: Trevor Jesty & John Steele
Player of the match: Garry Park (Derbyshire)

26 April 2009
(scorecard)

Northamptonshire Steelbacks; 240 all out (47.3 overs)	v	Lancashire Lightning; 241/4 (44.5 overs)
Andrew Hall 81 (93); Sajid Mahmood 3/38 (9 overs)		Paul Horton 100 (108); David Lucas 2/39 (8 overs)

Lancashire won by 6 wickets
County Ground, Derby
Umpires: Barry Dudleston & Richard Illingworth
Player of the match: Paul Horton (Lancashire)

3 May 2009
(scorecard)

Essex Eagles; 297/6 (50 overs)	v	Glamorgan Dragons; 299/2 (46.1 overs)
Varun Chopra 99 (125); Mark Cosgrove 2/50 (10 overs)		Gareth Rees 123* (138); Graham Napier 1/55 (8 overs)

Glamorgan won by 8 wickets
County Ground, Chelmsford
Umpires: Neil Bainton & Martin Bodenham
Player of the match: Gareth Rees (Glamorgan)

3 May 2009
(scorecard)

Derbyshire Phantoms; 240/6 (50 overs)	v	Lancashire Lightning; 241/2 (46.3 overs)
Wavell Hinds 95 (96); Sajid Mahmood 2/47 (10 overs)		Paul Horton 11* (144); Garry Park 1/23 (6 overs)

Lancashire won by 8 wickets
Old Trafford, Manchester
Umpires: Ian Gould & Jeremy Lloyds
Player of the match: Paul Horton (Lancashire)

4 May 2009
(scorecard)

Derbyshire Phantoms; 192/7 (43 overs)	v	Essex Eagles; 194/4 (40.1 overs)
Wavell Hinds 81 (112); Graham Napier 3/25 (9 overs)		Varun Chopra 69 (93); Greg Smith 1/31 (5 overs)

Essex won by 6 wickets
County Ground, Derby
Umpires: Neil Mallender & Peter Willey
Player of the match: Varun Chopra (Essex)

- Match was reduced before play started to 43 overs per side.

4 May 2009
(scorecard)

Northamptonshire Steelbacks; 200/9 (39 overs)	v	Glamorgan Dragons; 165/8 (39 overs)
Steven Crook 42 (52); Dean Cosker 3/26 (8 overs)		Dean Cosker 50* (36); Andrew Hall 4/14 (6 overs)

Northamptonshire won by 35 runs
County Ground, Derby
Umpires: Neil Bainton & Peter Hartley
Player of the match: Andrew Hall (Northamptonshire)

- Match was reduced before play started to 39 overs per side.

10 May 2009
(scorecard)

Lancashire Lightning; 157 all out (44.4 overs)	v	Essex Eagles; 160/4 (44.1 overs)
Ashwell Prince 44 (58); David Masters 3/19 (9 overs)		Varun Chopra 72 (99); Glen Chapple 2/16 (7 overs)

Essex won by 6 wickets
County Ground, Chelmsford
Umpires: Rob Bailey & Steve Garratt
Player of the match: David Masters (Essex)

10 May 2009
(scorecard)

Derbyshire Phantoms; 286/9 (50 overs)	v	Northamptonshire Steelbacks; 265 all out (49.2 overs)
Stuart Law 95 (113); Lee Daggett 4/51 (10 overs)		Mark Nelson 74 (67); Tim Groenewald 2/29 (8 overs)

Derbyshire won by 21 runs
County Ground, Northampton
Umpires: Nick Cook & George Sharp
Player of the match: Stuart Law (Derbyshire)

12 May 2009
(scorecard)

Glamorgan Dragons; 124 all out (46.2 overs)	v	Essex Eagles; 127/3 (25.5 overs)
Ben Wright 40* (73); Danish Kaneria 4/16 (10 overs)		Graham Napier 41 (36); Dean Cosker 2/48 (6.5 overs)

Essex won by 7 wickets
SWALEC Stadium, Cardiff
Umpires: Richard Illingworth & Neil Mallender
Player of the match: Danish Kaneria (Essex)

12 May 2009
(scorecard)

Northamptonshire Steelbacks; 211/9 (50 overs)	v	Lancashire Lightning; 213/4 (47.3 overs)
Nicky Boje 50 (57); Glen Chapple 2/32 (10 overs)		Ashwell Prince 78 (97); Andrew Hall 1/38 (10 overs)

Lancashire won by 6 wickets
Old Trafford, Manchester
Umpires: Trevor Jesty & Richard Kettleborough
Player of the match: Ashwell Prince (Lancashire)

13 May 2009
(scorecard)

Lancashire Lightning; 296/8 (50 overs)	v	Derbyshire Phantoms; 175 all out (38.4 overs)
Francois du Plessis 112 (86); Greg Smith 4/53 (10 overs)		Chris Rogers 68 (72); Gary Keedy 4/43 (9 overs)

Lancashire won by 114 runs (D/L)
County Ground, Derby
Umpires: Nigel Cowley & David Millns
Player of the match: Francois du Plessis (Lancashire)

- Derbyshire target was 290 runs in 48 overs.

15 May 2009
(scorecard)

Derbyshire Phantoms	v	Northamptonshire Steelbacks

Match abandoned without a ball bowled
County Ground, Derby
Umpires: Nigel Llong & John Steele

15 May 2009
(scorecard)

Glamorgan Dragons; 172/8 (31 overs)	v	Lancashire Lightning; 208/2 (28 overs)
Mark Cosgrove 68 (65); Oliver Newby 4/41 (6 overs)		Tom Smith 87* (88); James Harris 2/47 (7 overs)

Lancashire won by 8 wickets (D/L)
SWALEC Stadium, Cardiff
Umpires: Tim Robinson & Barry Dudleston
Player of the match: Tom Smith (Lancashire)

- Match was reduced to 31 overs per side. Lancashire target was 208 runs.

17 May 2009
(scorecard)

Northamptonshire Steelbacks; 121/4 (18 overs)	v	Essex Eagles
Rob White 51 (57); Chris Wright 3/22 (3 overs)

No result
County Ground, Northampton
Umpires: Rob Bailey & Jeff Evans

- Match was reduced before play started to 31 overs per side. Match was reduced to 18 overs per side. Essex target was 140 runs.

18 May 2009
(scorecard)

Essex Eagles; 192 all out (44.3 overs)	v	Derbyshire Phantoms; 195/7 (46.2 overs)
James Foster 71 (85); Greg Smith 3/50 (10 overs)		Stuart Law 62* (75); Danish Kaneria 5/32 (10 overs)

Derbyshire won by 3 wickets
County Ground, Chelmsford
Umpires: Vanburn Holder & Jeremy Lloyds

19 May 2009
(scorecard)

Glamorgan Dragons	v	Northamptonshire Steelbacks

Match abandoned without a ball bowled
St. Helen's, Swansea
Umpires: Michael Gough & Richard Kettleborough

20 May 2009
(scorecard)

Derbyshire Phantoms; 211 all out (49.1 overs)	v	Glamorgan Dragons; 212/5 (47.2 overs)
Chris Rogers 59 (86); David Harrison 3/39 (10 overs)		Jamie Dalrymple 78* (111); Greg Smith 2/39 (9 overs)

Glamorgan won by 5 wickets
SWALEC Stadium, Cardiff
Umpires: George Sharp & Peter Willey
Player of the match: Jamie Dalrymple (Glamorgan)

20 May 2009
(scorecard)

Lancashire Lightning; 214/7 (50 overs)	v	Essex Eagles; 207/5 (45.3 overs)
Francois du Plessis 51 (59); Chris Wright 2/38 (10 overs)		Alastair Cook 65 (94); Tom Smith 2/30 (9 overs)

Essex won by 5 wickets (D/L)
Old Trafford, Manchester
Umpires: Trevor Jesty & Nigel Llong
Player of the match: Francois du Plessis (Lancashire)

- Essex target was 207 runs in 46 overs.

== Knockout stage ==
=== Quarter finals ===
23 May 2009
(scorecard)

Hampshire Hawks; 310/4 (50 overs)	v	Middlesex Panthers; 266 all out (49.2 overs)
Michael Lumb 100 (98); Shaun Udal 2/45 (10 overs)		Neil Dexter 79 (100); Billy Taylor 3/44 (9.2 overs)

Hampshire won by 44 runs
The Rose Bowl, Southampton
Umpires: Trevor Jesty & George Sharp
Player of the match: Michael Lumb (Hampshire)

23 May 2009
(scorecard)

Lancashire Lightning; 262/6 (50 overs)	v	Essex Eagles; 195 all out (44 overs)
Francois du Plessis 113* (75); Grant Flower 2/9 (3 overs)		Grant Flower 44 (57); Gary Keedy 4/45 (10 overs)

Lancashire won by 67 runs
Old Trafford, Manchester
Umpires: Tim Robinson & Peter Willey
Player of the match: Francois du Plessis (Lancashire)

23 May 2009
(scorecard)

Somerset Sabres; 285/8 (50 overs)	v	Sussex Sharks; 288/4 (49.1 overs)
Craig Kieswetter 106 (112); Yasir Arafat 3/52 (10 overs)		Murray Goodwin 93 (92); Omari Banks 1/39 (8 overs)

Sussex won by 6 wickets
County Ground, Taunton
Umpires: Jeremy Lloyds & Rob Bailey
Player of the match: Murray Goodwin (Sussex)

16 June 2009
(scorecard)

Nottinghamshire Outlaws; 189 all out (44.2 overs)	v	Gloucestershire Gladiators; 190/4 (37.3 overs)
Chris Read 57 (78); Jon Lewis 4/34 (9 overs)		Craig Spearman 50 (66); Samit Patel 2/41 (8 overs)

Gloucestershire won by 4 wickets
Nevil Road, Bristol
Umpires: Ray Illingworth & Neil Mallender
Player of the match: Steve Kirby (Gloucestershire)

=== Semi finals ===
5 July 2009
(scorecard)

Sussex Sharks; 326/7 (50 overs)	v	Gloucestershire Gladiators; 292 (47.4 overs)
Ed Joyce 146 (139); Richard Dawson 2/50 (10 overs)		Alex Gidman 116 (117); Michael Yardy 4/54 (8.4 overs)

Sussex won by 34 runs
County Ground, Hove
Umpires: Rob Bailey & Ray Illingworth
Player of the match: Ed Joyce (Sussex)

5 July 2009
(scorecard)

Lancashire Lightning; 207 (45.4 overs)	v	Hampshire Hawks; 271 (48.4 overs)
VVS Laxman 54 (77); Imran Tahir 3/38 (10 overs)		James Adams 78 (71); Glen Chapple 3/46 (9.4 overs)

Hampshire won by 64 runs
Old Trafford, Manchester
Umpires: Peter Hartley & Richard Kettleborough
Player of the match: James Adams (Hampshire)

== Final ==
25 July 2009
(scorecard)

Sussex Sharks; 219/9 (50 overs)	v	Hampshire Hawks; 221/4 (40.3 overs)
Michael Yardy 92* (127); Dominic Cork 4/41 (10 overs)		James Adams 55 (65); Luke Wright 3/50 (9 overs)

Hampshire won by 6 wickets
Lord's Cricket Ground, London
Umpires: Nigel Llong & Neil Mallender
Player of the match: Dominic Cork (Hampshire)
