= Weeraratna =

Weeraratna is a Sri Lankan surname. Notable people with the surname include:

- Ashani Weeraratna (born 1970/1971), American-South African cancer researcher
- Asoka Weeraratna (1918–1999), Sri Lankan Buddhist missionary
- Sean Weeraratna (born 1985), Scottish cricketer
