= Danneels =

Danneels is a Belgian surname. Notable people with the surname include:

- Godfried Danneels (1933–2019), Belgian cardinal
- Gustave Danneels (1913–1976), Belgian cyclist

== See also ==
- Daneels
