= Graeme White =

English cricketer (born 1987)

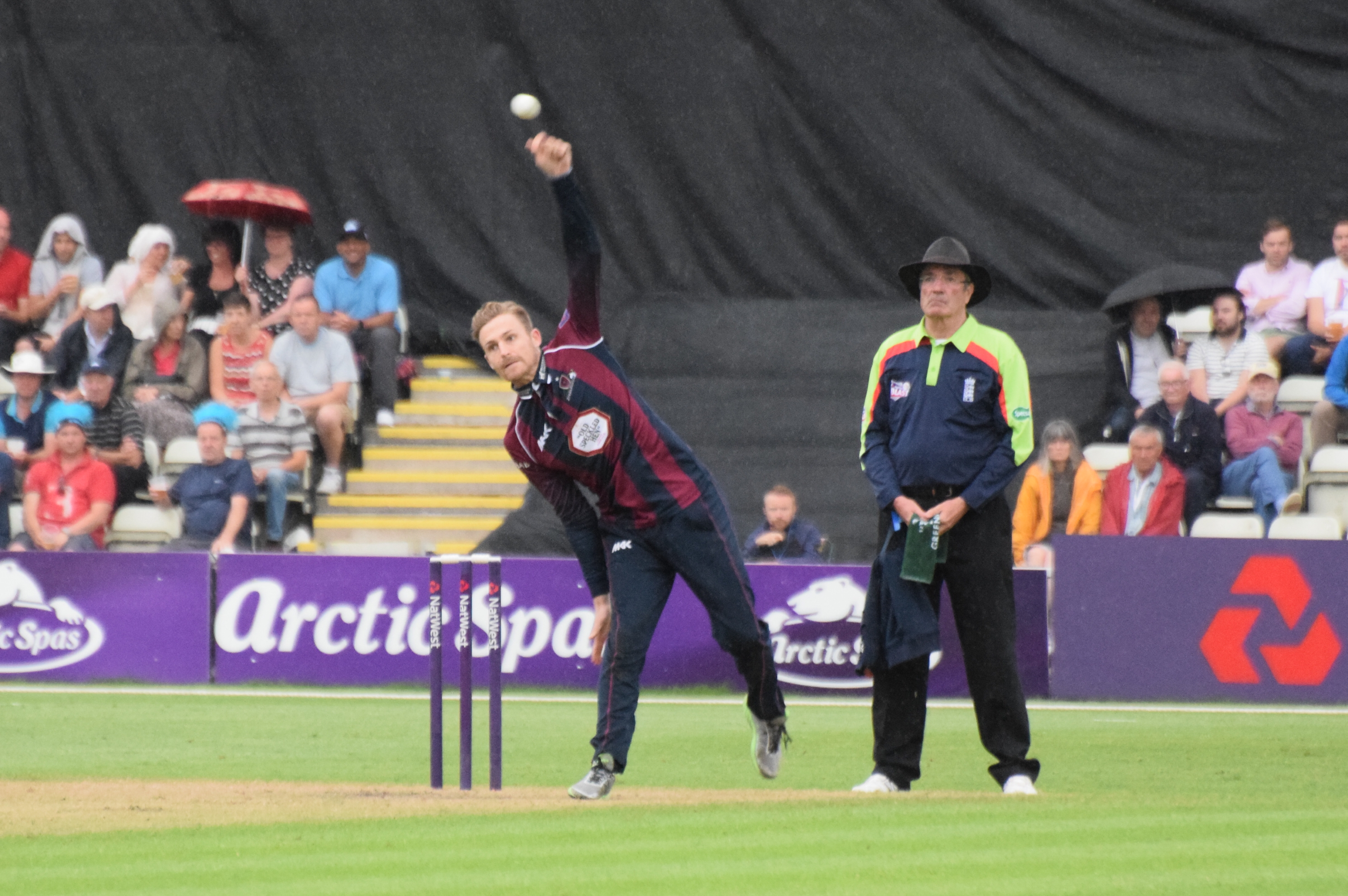

Personal information
- Full name: Graeme Geoffrey White
- Born: 18 April 1987 (age 39); Milton Keynes, Buckinghamshire, England
- Nickname: Chalky, MOCCC King, Justin Timberlake
- Batting: Right-handed
- Bowling: Slow left-arm orthodox

Domestic team information
- Years: Team
- 2006–2009: Northamptonshire
- 2010–2013: Nottinghamshire
- 2013: → Northamptonshire (on loan)
- 2014–2023: Northamptonshire
- 2021: Welsh Fire
- FC debut: 24 May 2006 Northamptonshire v Derbyshire
- LA debut: 20 May 2007 Northamptonshire v Durham

Career statistics
Competition	FC	LA	T20
Matches	39	89	148
Runs scored	659	558	486
Batting average	13.18	15.08	14.29
100s/50s	0/2	0/0	0/0
Top score	65	41*	37*
Balls bowled	4,776	3,360	2,423
Wickets	65	94	121
Bowling average	42.00	29.82	27.12
5 wickets in innings	1	2	1
10 wickets in match	0	0	0
Best bowling	6/44	6/37	5/22
Catches/stumpings	12/–	29/–	58/–
- Source: CricketArchive, 28 September 2023

Graeme Geoffrey White (born 18 April 1987) is a professional cricketer currently playing for Northamptonshire.

== Career ==
Graeme was educated at Stowe School in Buckinghamshire, which is also where former Northamptonshire teammates Rob White, Ben Howgego and Mark Nelson studied. Earlier on in his career, he scored 109 and took 7 for 21 for Staffordshire U17s during 2003. Graeme then progressed on to playing second XI cricket for Northamptonshire at the end of the 2004 season and throughout the 2005 season. He played for England in the 2006 U-19 Cricket World Cup in Sri Lanka.

In 2009 Graeme moved to Nottinghamshire citing the need for regular first team cricket as the main motivation. He made little impact at Notts and briefly returned to Northants on loan in June 2013, and later that year signed a longer term contract with the club.

Graeme's highest first-class innings came on 10 August 2007, when he scored 65, sharing in a 145-run partnership with David Sales. His best first-class bowling figures are 6/44, playing for Northants against Glamorgan at Northampton in September 2016.
