= Brett Thompson =

Brett Thompson may refer to:

- Brett Thompson (cricketer) (born 1987), South African cricketer
- Brett Thompson (racing driver) (born 1977), American racing driver
- Brett Thompson (rugby union) (born 1990), American rugby union player
