= Daneel =

Daneel is a surname. Notable people with the surname include:

- George Daneel (1904–2004), South African rugby player
- Pieter Daneel (born 1987), South African cricketer and businessman

== See also ==
- Daneels
- Daniel
- R. Daneel Olivaw, fictional character
