= Tarisai Mahlunge =

Zimbabwean cricketer (born 1988)

Tarisai Mahlunge, born 21 April 1988 in Harare, is a Zimbabwean cricketer who played in the 2006 U-19 Cricket World Cup in Sri Lanka. He is a wicket-keeper and left-handed batsman and has played first-class and List A cricket for the Centrals cricket team in Zimbabwe.
