= 2021 Portugal Tri-Nation Series =

International cricket tournament

- Date: 19–22 August 2021
- Location: Portugal
- Result: Portugal won the tournament
Teams
Gibraltar	Malta	Portugal
Captains
Edmund Packard	Bikram Arora	Najjam Shahzad
Most runs
Chris Delany (151)	Varun Thamotharam (162)	Azhar Andani (276)
Most wickets
Edmund Packard (4) Adam Orfila (4)	Bilal Muhammad (5); Waseem Abbas (5)	Sirajullah Khadim (9)

The 2021 Portugal Tri-Nation Series was a Twenty20 International (T20I) cricket tournament that took place in Portugal from 19 to 22 August 2021. The participating teams were the hosts Portugal, along with Gibraltar and Malta. The matches were played at the Gucherre Cricket Ground, in Albergaria, near the city of Santarém. These were the first official T20I matches to be played in Portugal since the International Cricket Council (ICC) granted full T20I status to all competitive matches between its members from 1 January 2019.

Portugal won the tournament with a perfect record. In the fourth match of the tournament, Maltese pair Bikram Arora and Varun Thamotharam set a new record fourth-wicket partnership in T20Is, when they added an unbeaten 166 runs against Gibraltar.

== Squads ==
Gibraltar	Malta	Portugal
Edmund Packard (c); Samarth Bodha; Louis Bruce; Richard Cunningham; Chris Delany; James Fitzgerald; Mark Garratt; Charles Harrison; Patrick Hatchman; Richard Hatchman; Joseph Marples (wk); Kenroy Nestor; Adam Orfila; Avinash Pai; Dave Robeson	Bikram Arora (c); Waseem Abbas; Samuel Aquilina; Ashok Bishnoi; Gopal Chaturvedi; Heinrich Gericke (wk); Michael Goonetilleke; Zeeshan Khan; Niraj Khanna; Haroon Mughal; Bilal Muhammad; Indika Perera; Justin Shaju; Amar Sharma; Ravinder Singh; Samuel Stanislaus; Varun Thamotharam	Najjam Shahzad (c); Azhar Andani; Rahul Bhardwaj; Paolo Buccimazza (wk); Anthony Chambers; Sirajullah Khadim; Imran Khan; Junaid Khan; Mien Mehmood; Arslan Naseem; Zulfiqar Ali Shah; Amandeep Singh; Miguel Stoman; Amir Zaib

== Round-robin ==
=== Points table ===
Team	P	W	L	T	NR	Pts	NRR
Portugal	4	4	0	0	0	8	+3.110
Malta	4	2	2	0	0	4	–0.159
Gibraltar	4	0	4	0	0	0	–2.952

=== Fixtures ===
19 August 2021
11:00
Scorecard

Malta; 146/8 (20 overs)	v	Portugal; 147/4 (18.1 overs)
Zeeshan Khan 39 (21); Sirajullah Khadim 2/28 (4 overs)		Azhar Andani 46 (42); Bilal Muhammad 1/14 (4 overs)

Portugal won by 6 wickets
Gucherre Cricket Ground, Albergaria
Umpires: Naeem Akhtar (Por) and Parth Jounjat (Por)
Player of the match: Amir Zaib (Por)

- Portugal won the toss and elected to field.
- Azhar Andani, Anthony Chambers, Sirajullah Khadim, Junaid Khan, Amandeep Singh, Miguel Stoman, Amir Zaib (Por) and Justin Shaju (Mlt) all made their T20I debuts.

20 August 2021
11:00
Scorecard

Gibraltar; 148/5 (20 overs)	v	Malta; 149/2 (17.3 overs)
Louis Bruce 60 (53); Waseem Abbas 3/29 (4 overs)		Bikram Arora 59* (49); Adam Orfila 1/20 (3 overs)

Malta won by 8 wickets
Gucherre Cricket Ground, Albergaria
Umpires: Naeem Akhtar (Por) and Sunil Chandiramani (Gib)
Player of the match: Waseem Abbas (Mlt)

- Malta won the toss and elected to field.
- Louis Bruce, Charles Harrison, Patrick Hatchman and Joseph Marples (Gib) all made their T20I debuts.

21 August 2021
09:00
Scorecard

Portugal; 217/8 (20 overs)	v	Gibraltar; 121/8 (20 overs)
Azhar Andani 100 (51); Edmund Packard 3/34 (4 overs)		James Fitzgerald 27 (25); Junaid Khan 3/24 (4 overs)

Portugal won by 96 runs
Gucherre Cricket Ground, Albergaria
Umpires: Naeem Akhtar (Por) and Sunil Chandiramani (Gib)
Player of the match: Azhar Andani (Por)

- Gibraltar won the toss and elected to field.
- Azhar Andani became the first player for Portugal to score a century in T20Is.

21 August 2021
15:00
Scorecard

Malta; 197/3 (20 overs)	v	Gibraltar; 193/2 (20 overs)
Varun Thamotharam 104* (52); Kenroy Nestor 2/32 (4 overs)		Chris Delany 69* (37); Bilal Muhammad 1/29 (4 overs)

Malta won by 4 runs
Gucherre Cricket Ground, Albergaria
Umpires: Sunil Chandiramani (Gib) and Parth Jounjat (Por)
Player of the match: Varun Thamotharam (Mlt)

- Gibraltar won the toss and elected to field.
- Richard Cunningham (Gib) made his T20I debut.
- Varun Thamotharam became the first player for Malta to score a century in T20Is.
- Bikram Arora and Varun Thamotharam (Mlt) set a new record for the highest fourth-wicket partnership (166*) in T20Is.

22 August 2021
09:00
Scorecard

Portugal; 218/6 (20 overs)	v	Gibraltar; 108 (18.3 overs)
Azhar Andani 81 (45); James Fitzgerald 2/47 (4 overs)		Patrick Hatchman 22 (25); Sirajullah Khadim 3/16 (4 overs)

Portugal won by 110 runs
Gucherre Cricket Ground, Albergaria
Umpires: Naeem Akhtar (Por) and Parth Jounjat (Por)
Player of the match: Azhar Andani (Por)

- Gibraltar won the toss and elected to field.

22 August 2021
15:00
Scorecard

Malta; 132/8 (20 overs)	v	Portugal; 136/7 (17.5 overs)
Varun Thamotharam 36 (27); Sirajullah Khadim 3/24 (4 overs)		Azhar Andani 49 (41); Waseem Abbas 2/30 (3.5 overs)

Portugal won by 3 wickets
Gucherre Cricket Ground, Albergaria
Umpires: Naeem Akhtar (Por) and Parth Jounjat (Por)
Player of the match: Amir Zaib (Por)

- Malta won the toss and elected to bat.
- Rahul Bhardwaj, Arslan Naseem and Zulfiqar Ali Shah (Por) all made their T20I debuts.
