= Scott MacLennan =

Scottish cricketer (born 1987)

Scott Keith MacLennan (born 30 November 1987 in Glasgow) is a Scotland cricketer who played in the 2006 U-19 Cricket World Cup in Sri Lanka. He was educated at Fettes College, Edinburgh, and St John's College, Cambridge. He later played first-class cricket for Cambridge University.
