= Tyler Buchan =

Scottish cricketer (born 1985)

Personal information
- Full name: Tyler John Buchan
- Born: 12 September 1985 (age 41); Aberdeen, Aberdeenshire, Scotland
- Batting: Right-handed
- Bowling: Right-arm medium-fast

Domestic team information
- Years: Team
- 2011/12: Scotland

Career statistics
Competition	Twenty20
Matches	5
Runs scored	5
Batting average	2.50
100s/50s	–/–
Top score	3
Balls bowled	60
Wickets	2
Bowling average	49.50
5 wickets in innings	–
10 wickets in match	–
Best bowling	1/17
Catches/stumpings	1/–
- Source: Cricinfo, 15 June 2022

Tyler John Buchan (born 12 September 1985) is a Scottish former cricketer.

Buchan was born at Aberdeen in September 1985. He was selected in the Scotland Under-19 squad for the 2006 ICC Under-19 Cricket World Cup, making three appearances during the tournament. He later played for the senior Scotland side during their tour of Namibia in October 2011, making five Twenty20 appearances against the Namibian cricket team. He took two wickets during the series. In club cricket, Buchan played for Aberdeenshire Cricket Club.
