= Jamshed Ahmed =

Pakistani cricketer (born 1988)

Mohammad Jamshed Ahmed
Personal information
- Full name: Mohammad Jamshed Ahmed
- Born: 10 December 1988 (age 37); Lahore, Punjab, Pakistan
- Batting: Left-handed
- Bowling: Left-arm fast-medium
- Role: Bowler

Domestic team information
- Years: Team
- 2006–2014: PIA
- 2006–2007: Lahore Shalimar
- 2005–2011: Lahore Eagles
- Source: Cricinfo, 27 September 2023

Jamshed Ahmed (born 10 December 1988) is a Pakistani left-arm swing bowler. As well as playing first-class cricket, he was part of the pace attack that led Pakistan to the 2006 U-19 Cricket World Cup in Sri Lanka.
