= Greg Cork =

English cricketer (born 1994)

Personal information
- Full name: Greg Teodor Gerald Cork
- Born: 29 August 1994 (age 32); Derby, Derbyshire, England
- Batting: Right-handed
- Bowling: Left-arm medium-fast
- Role: All-rounder
- Relatives: Dominic Cork (father)

Domestic team information
- Years: Team
- 2014–2017: Derbyshire (squad no. 14)
- FC debut: 20 September 2016 Derbyshire v Worcestershire
- LA debut: 26 July 2015 Derbyshire v Somerset

Career statistics
Competition	FC	LA	T20
Matches	2	3	10
Runs scored	53	8	43
Batting average	17.66	8.00	14.33
100s/50s	0/0	0/0	0/0
Top score	49	8	13*
Balls bowled	282	80	165
Wickets	0	5	8
Bowling average	–	19.60	34.62
5 wickets in innings	–	0	0
10 wickets in match	–	0	0
Best bowling	–	2/17	2/36
Catches/stumpings	1/–	0/–	4/–
- Source: ESPNcricinfo, 29 September 2017

Gregory Teodor Gerald Cork (born 29 September 1994) is an English cricketer who played for Derbyshire County Cricket Club. The son of former Derbyshire and England all-rounder Dominic Cork, Cork is a right-handed batsman who bowls left-arm medium-fast. He left Derbyshire upon the expiry of his contract at the end of the 2017 season. He has played in Australia as the overseas player at Surrey Hills Cricket Club in Melbourne.
