= Dominic Cork =

English cricketer

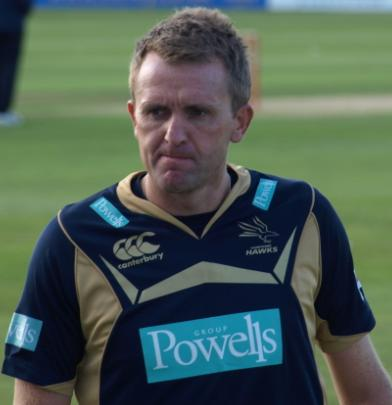
- Cork in September 2009

Personal information
- Full name: Dominic Gerald Cork
- Born: 7 August 1971 (age 55); Newcastle-under-Lyme, Staffordshire, England
- Nickname: Corky, Half-Pint
- Height: 188 cm (6 ft 2 in)
- Batting: Right-handed
- Bowling: Right-arm fast-medium
- Role: All-rounder
- Relatives: Greg Cork (son)

International information
- National side: England
- Test debut (cap 572): 22 June 1995 v West Indies
- Last Test: 9 September 2002 v India
- ODI debut (cap 118): 24 August 1992 v Pakistan
- Last ODI: 22 September 2002 v India
- ODI shirt no.: 7

Domestic team information
- Years: Team
- 1989–1990: Staffordshire
- 1990–2003: Derbyshire
- 2004–2008: Lancashire
- 2009–2011: Hampshire

Career statistics
Competition	Test	ODI	FC	LA
Matches	37	32	321	314
Runs scored	864	180	10,114	4,184
Batting average	18.00	10.00	25.03	20.92
100s/50s	0/3	0/0	8/54	0/19
Top score	59	31*	200*	93
Balls bowled	7,678	1,772	54,314	14,675
Wickets	131	41	989	382
Bowling average	29.81	27.43	26.73	27.75
5 wickets in innings	5	0	36	4
10 wickets in match	0	0	5	0
Best bowling	7/43	3/27	9/43	6/21
Catches/stumpings	18/–	6/–	237/–	113/–
- Source: Cricinfo, 12 September 2011

Dominic Gerald Cork (born 7 August 1971) is a former English county and international cricketer. Cork was an all-rounder who batted at lower-order batsman and bowled right-arm fast-medium, and was renowned for his swing and seam control. Cork had a lethal out-swinger that got him success throughout the 1990s. In 1995, he took the best figures for an England bowler on Test debut, with 7 for 43 in the second innings against the West Indies.

Making his début in first-class cricket for Derbyshire in 1990, he was selected to play for England in 1992, aged 21. He made 69 appearances for England from 1992 to 2002. Cork played for Derbyshire for 13 years, before leaving under controversial circumstances to join Lancashire in 2004. Leaving Lancashire after the 2008 season, Cork joined Hampshire, who he played for from 2009 to 2011, acting as captain for much of the 2010 and 2011 seasons. While at Hampshire he won the 2009 Friends Provident Trophy, and captained the county to victory in the 2010 Friends Provident t20. He was released by Hampshire at the end of the 2011 season, shortly thereafter he announced his retirement on Sky Sports News on 22 September 2011. His popular nickname is "Corky".

== Early life ==
Cork was born the youngest of three boys in Newcastle-under-Lyme to Mary and Gerald Cork, both Catholics of West Country origin. His grandfather, Archibald Cork, played non-league football for Port Vale F.C. in the 1910s. His father worked as a financial consultant. He was educated at St. Joseph's College, Stoke-on-Trent, before continuing his education at Newcastle-under-Lyme College.

== International career ==
While playing for Staffordshire, Cork made his Youth ODI début for England Under-19's against New Zealand Under-19s in August 1989. Later in August he made his Youth Test début against the same opposition. He played six further Youth Tests to 1990 and five further Youth ODIs to 1990. Following strong performances for Derbyshire in the 1991 season, he earned himself a call up to the England A team for their 1992 tour of the West Indies, where he played in two first-class matches against the Windward Islands and West Indies A.

Later in the year, following further strong performances for Derbyshire, he made his full international début in a One Day International against Pakistan at Old Trafford. He took one wicket in the match, that of Inzamam-ul-Haq. Cork played infrequently for England over the coming seasons, playing just two ODIs each in 1993 and 1994, against Australia and South Africa respectively. However, in May 1995 he played in three ODIs against the West Indies, taking 6 wickets at a bowling average of 21.81, with best figures 3/27.

Later in the season he made his Test debut against the same opposition. In his maiden Test match he hit the first ball he received for 4 runs before going on to score 30 runs in England's first-innings, eventually being bowled by Courtney Walsh. In the second innings he scored 23 runs before being dismissed by Ian Bishop. His first Test wicket came in the West Indies' first innings when he dismissed Ian Bishop. More was to come in their second innings when from 124/3, Cork unleashed a bowling spell in which he took 7/43 – the best figures by an Englishman on Test debut – to help dismiss them for 223. This performance highlighted that at the time, Cork was the best all-rounder in England and also got his name on the Lord's Honours Boards. It also earned him the tag of "the new Botham" from the media. Two Tests later he took a Test cricket hat-trick (only the 22nd in Test history), when he dismissed Richie Richardson, Junior Murray and Carl Hooper in successive balls in the West Indies second-innings; he was the first Englishman since Peter Loader in 1957 to achieve the feat. Cork finished the series with 26 wickets at an average of 25.42. He also struck his maiden Test half century, making an unbeaten 56 in the 4th Test.

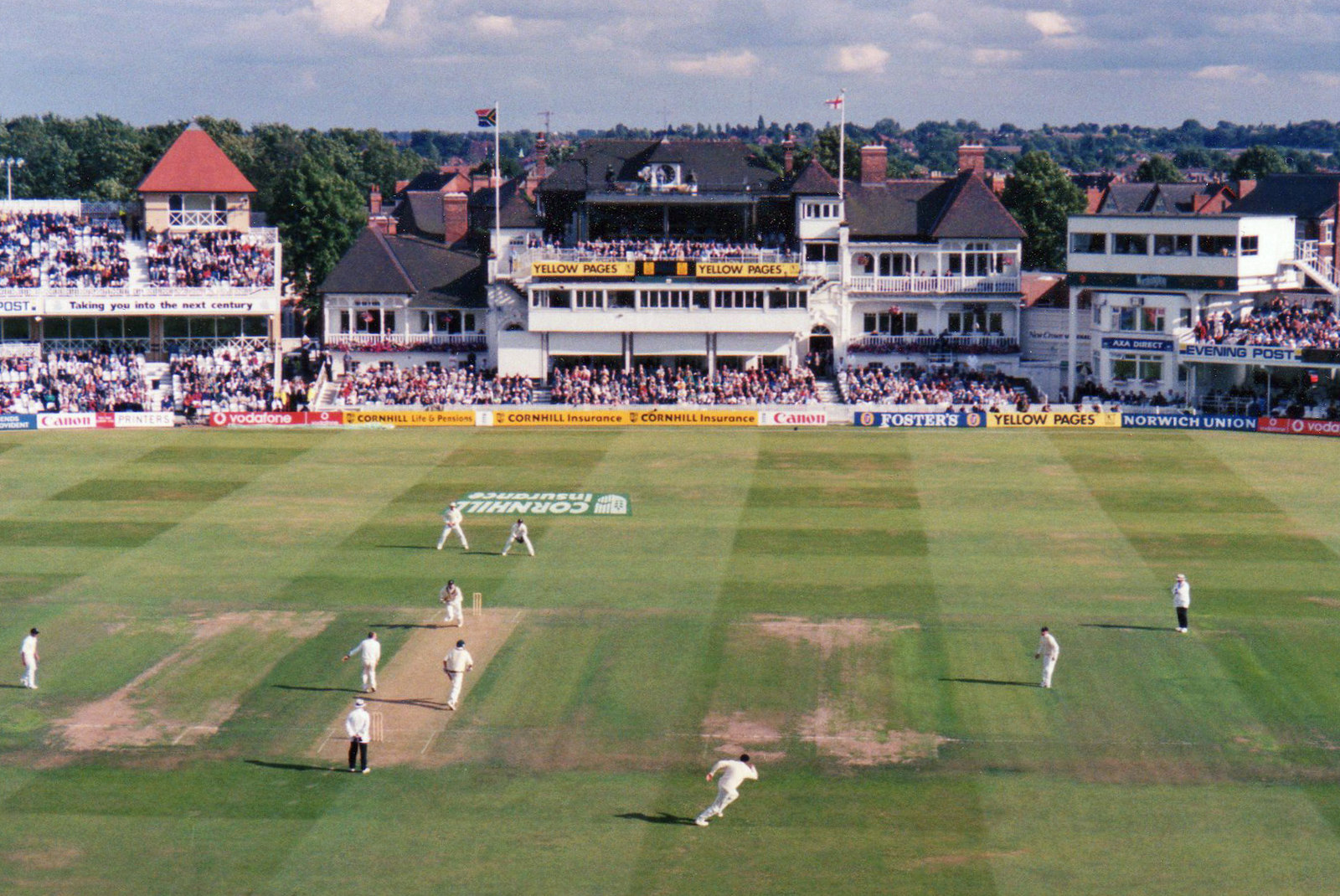
Shaun Pollock has just clipped Cork through mid-wicket during the 1st Test between England and South Africa in 1998 at Trent Bridge

Cork had a productive time in South Africa during their winter tour, playing five Tests and six ODIs during the tour. Cork was once more England's leading wicket-taker, with 19 Test wickets at an average of 25.52 and best innings figures of 5/84. He was similarly successful in the ODI series with the ball, England's second highest wicket-taker behind Derbyshire teammate Phil DeFreitas, with 10 wickets at 26.40 a piece. Cork was selected at part of England's squad for the 1996 World Cup in India, Pakistan and Sri Lanka. In a tournament in which none of the England bowlers shone, Cork was the leading English wicket-taker, with 8 at 27.00. Despite this, Cork and rest of the England team were heavily criticised in the media for what had been an unsuccessful tournament which saw them defeated by eventual winners Sri Lanka in the quarter-finals.

Later in 1996, Cork had a less successful period in Test cricket, taking 10 wickets during India's three match Test tour at an average of 36.90. Later followed a quiet Test series against Pakistan, in which he had 12 wickets at a little over 36 a piece. His form with the bat was little better in either series, with his all-round ability seemingly having deserted him. Despite this, he was made a Wisden Cricketer of the Year in 1996. Prior to the tour of New Zealand, Cork suffered personal issues off the pitch with the breakdown of his marriage to his first wife Jane. His personal issues impacted his performances on the field, this was illustrated by his bowling performances. At the end of the Test series he had taken just 7 wickets at an average of 42.85. His batting did fare better, scoring 59 in the first Test and he led England to a series winning victory in the 3rd Test, putting on 76 runs with John Crawley to remind people of the batting side of his game. He fared even worse in the ODI series though, taking just a single wicket throughout at the cost of 145 runs. He would not play another ODI until 2001. Cork described how he was not in the right frame of mind to play international cricket at the time and how his performances were affected by this, further commenting he had no idea when running in to bowl what delivery he would send down to the batsman. There was, however, a feeling in some quarters that Cork was "more style than substance", and during the tour he was the target of a comment from Geoffrey Boycott who alleged that Cork was a "show pony" with "an attitude problem". Cork was prevented from answering Boycott back when injury prevented him from playing during most of the 1997 English season.

Over a year after his previous Test appearance for England, he featured in the Test series during South Africa's 1998 tour of England. Cork's return was fairly successful; he took 18 wickets at an average of 31.83, with best innings figures of 6/119. His best figures came in the 2nd Test at Lord's, thus placing his name on the Lord's honours board for a second time. He later played in England's only Test against Sri Lanka at The Oval where he claimed the wickets of Marvan Atapattu and Romesh Kaluwitharana in the Sri Lankan first-innings, in a match the tourists won by 10 wickets. Cork later went on that winter's Ashes tour. He played in the opening two Tests at the Gabba and The WACA, claiming only 4 wickets in all at an average of 41.25. This was to be the final time Cork would play a Test outside England.

In 2000, Cork was recalled to the England Test squad for the West Indies tour of England, where he featured in four Test matches. Cork was in fantastic form with the ball during the series, having arguably his best returns in Test cricket. He took 20 wickets at an impressive average of 12.25, in partnership with Darren Gough and Andy Caddick, against a West Indian team which was in decline, but that still had talented players like Brian Lara, Courtney Walsh, Curtly Ambrose and Shivnarine Chanderpaul. One of Cork's defining moments in Test cricket came during the series, when in the 2nd Test England were 149/7, needing to reach 188 to win, Cork entered the fray. Cork scampered singles and struck boundaries when needed, including a pulled six off the bowling of Franklyn Rose and in conjunction with Darren Gough, led England to a two wicket win in the dusk at Lord's shortly before 7 pm. He was later ruled out of the winter tour of Pakistan due to a back injury.

Cork featured in the Pakistani tour of England in 2001 and after four years he was recalled to play in the ODI series involving Pakistan and Australia. Cork had limited success upon his recall, taking six wickets at an average of 35.83. He later played in the 2nd Test of the 2001 Ashes at Lord's, scoring 24 runs in England first-innings before being dismissed by Jason Gillespie. In England's second-innings he scored just 2 runs before being dismissed by Glenn McGrath. He was ineffective with the ball, taking just a single wicket in the match, that of Steve Waugh in the Australians first-innings. Cork later played a single Test against Sri Lanka in 2002 and played his final Tests in two matches against India. Cork's final ODI appearances for England came in the 2002 ICC Champions Trophy against India and Zimbabwe. He had little success and had seemed to lose his ability to outswing the ball, resorting to bowling the bouncer more often and increased sledging toward opponents.

With the end of his international career in following the tournament, Cork had played a total of 37 Test matches. In these he scored a total of 867 runs at an average of 18.00, with three half centuries and a high score of 59. In the field he took 18 catches. With the ball he took 131 wickets at an average of 29.81, with best figures of 7/43, claimed on debut. In ODIs he played 32 matches, scoring 180 runs at an average of 10.00, with a high score of 31*. With the ball he took 41 wickets at an average of 33.36, with best figures of 3/27. His benefit as an all-rounder was best observed in the Test format.

== Domestic career ==
=== Early career and Derbyshire ===
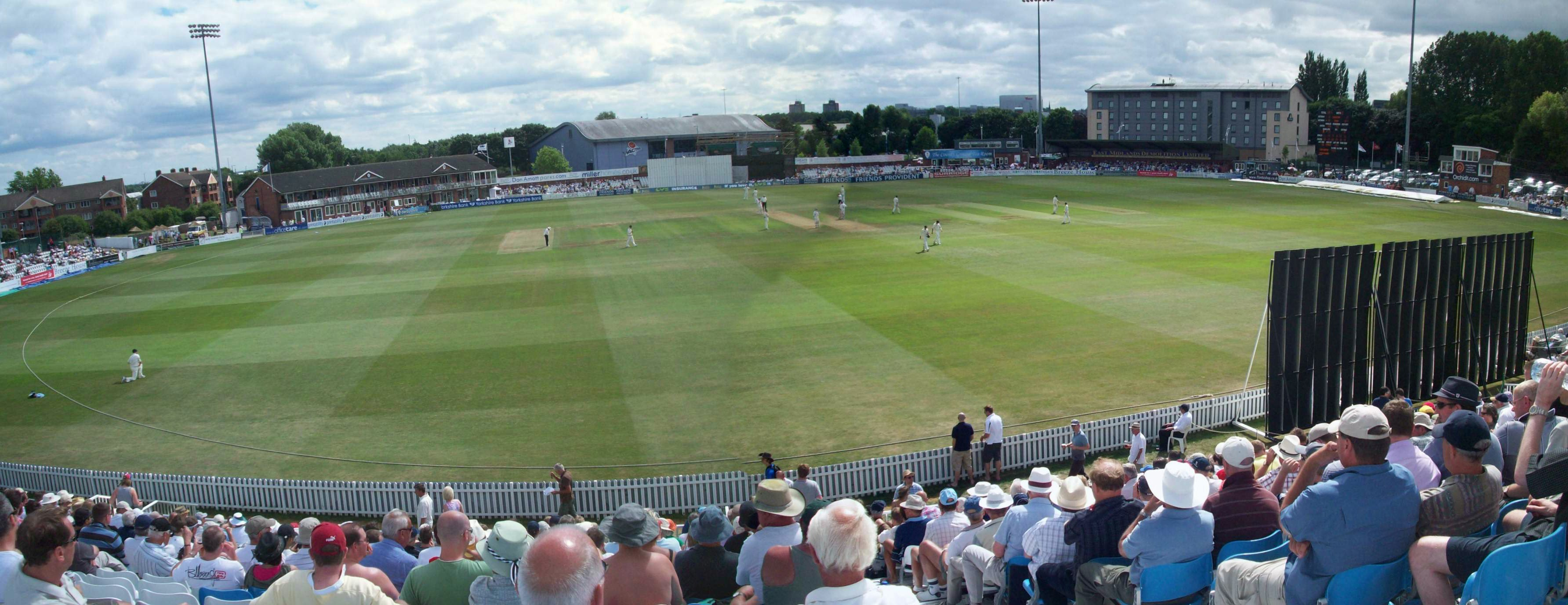
The County Ground, Derby, where Cork played for Derbyshire from 1990 to 2003

Cork first played county cricket for Staffordshire in the Minor Counties Championship against Bedfordshire, aged just 17. Cork played three further fixtures for Staffordshire in 1989, and the following season he played his only MCCA Knockout Trophy match for Staffordshire, which came against Shropshire. After playing for the Derbyshire Second XI in 1989, he made his full Derbyshire debut in a first-class match against the touring New Zealanders. His maiden first-class wicket came during this match, that of opening batsman Trevor Franklin in his first over which ended as a wicket maiden, and in the New Zealanders' second-innings he took the wicket of Mark Priest. He made his County Championship debut against Leicestershire in Derbyshire's final County Championship match in the same season. The following season he became a regular member of the Derbyshire team and made his List A debut against Yorkshire in the 1991 Refuge Assurance League. The 1991 season highlighted Cork's early potential as a potent all-rounder: he scored first-class 423 runs at a batting average of 21.15, with a high score of 44 and took 57 first-class wickets at a bowling average of 25.62. A performance of note came against a strong Essex team, with Cork taking figures of 8/53 in the Essex first-innings. His victims included future Test player Nick Knight and Pakistani international Saleem Malik.

His performances in the 1991 season earnt him a call up to the England A team during their tour of the West Indies. The following season Cork cemented his place in the Derbyshire team with increasingly impressive performances in both first-class and List A cricket. In first-class cricket he struck his maiden first-class half century and scored 578 runs at an average of 30.42, making a high score of 72 not out. With the ball he was less successful than the previous season, but still nonetheless took 48 wickets. In the same season he stood out with the ball in the one-day game, taking 27 wickets an average of 28.85, including his first five wicket haul in List A cricket. It was his consistent performances with the ball which led to his One Day International call-up in 1992. In 1993, Cork scored his maiden first-class century against Gloucestershire, making 104 runs. Cork was man-of-the-match in the final of the 1993 Benson & Hedges Cup against Lancashire, scoring an unbeaten 92 and taking the wicket of Mike Watkinson, as Derbyshire won the match by 6 runs. Despite playing a handful more ODIs, in general the 1993 and 1994 seasons were less productive seasons for Cork with the ball, taking 37 first-class wickets in both seasons. 1995 was to prove to be Cork's major breakthrough season, in which he rediscovered his form, taking 90 first-class wickets at an average of exactly 20, including a career-best 9/43 against Northamptonshire, which remains his best figures to this day, and with Cork making his Test debut.

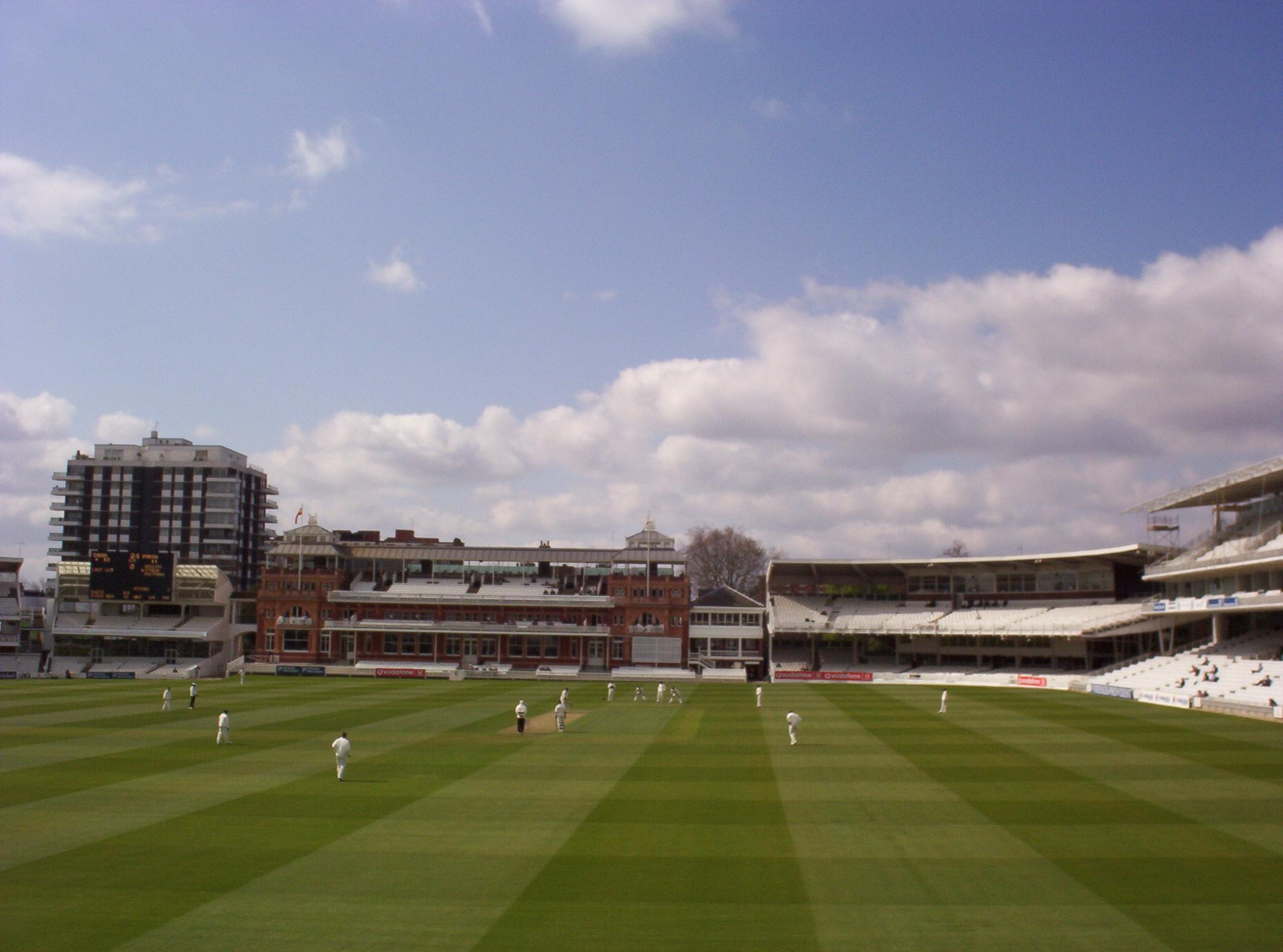
Lord's, where Cork was man-of-the-match in the 1993 Benson & Hedges Cup final

The coming seasons saw Cork become a regular feature in the England team, limiting his appearances for Derbyshire. 1996 saw him make limited appearances in both first-class and List A cricket, however a groin injury in the first County Championship match of 1997 led to him not playing any international cricket that season and limited his appearances for Derbyshire. In the 1998 season, Cork was appointed Derbyshire captain on a full-time basis, replacing Phil DeFreitas who had stood in following the resignation of Dean Jones. A return to the England Test fold in 1998 again limited his County Championship appearances, but he featured more for the county in that season's List A competitions. He scored 280 runs in one-day cricket and took 23 wickets at just under an average of 30. He captained Derbyshire in their 1998 NatWest Trophy final defeat against Lancashire at Lord's. Cork's recent struggles in international cricket, where he had lost his ability to bowl his much famed out-swinger resulted in him playing for Derbyshire for the majority of the 1999 season, where he took 55 wickets at an average of 22.34. The following season saw Cork return to the England Test team. A personal note of success that season came with Derbyshire in a County Championship match against Durham, where he made a double century, scoring an unbeaten 200.

However, Derbyshire at this point in the club's history was beset with internal divisions, stemming from the resignation two years earlier of Dean Jones from the captaincy. Such was the internal strife during that 1998 season that England's chairman of selectors David Graveney left Cork out of the 1999 World Cup squad, citing that the issues at Derbyshire were playing too heavily on Cork's mind to allow him to play international cricket. Before the start of the 1999 season, Cork demanded the Derbyshire committee return a number of powers to the captaincy, and when his demands went unfulfilled he threatened to resign from the county altogether. Allied with Cork in the dispute were teammates Kim Barnett and Karl Krikken. Cork carried out his threat and asked to be released from the remainder of the four seasons left on his contract. However Derbyshire refused to terminate the contract. Six months after the dispute began, the Derbyshire committee gave into Cork's demands allowing him more say over playing matters, coupled with the departure of Andy Hayhurst and Harold Rhodes from administration positions at the county, both of whom Cork cited as making his captaincy untenable. The internal divisions between Cork and the county management soon became public knowledge, with former players like Ian Blackwell vocal of Cork's captaincy methods and his "negative" impact on the dressing room. During the dispute his form began to suffer, and another injury in 2001 did not help his case. He was awarded a benefit year in 2001, with some of his benefit events being boycotted by the Derbyshire committee; this was a season in which Cork's appearances were limited to just a handful by his England duties and return to the England one-day side.

In 2002, Cork played more regularly for Derbyshire, but pressure began to build on his captaincy with Derbyshire performing poorly in List A cricket and ending the season 6th in the County Championship, although he did take 64 wickets at 18.90. Cork's international career came to an end in 2002, allowing him to dedicate himself to playing season long for Derbyshire. With the internal problems at the county, Cork's form with both bat and ball was erratic: his first-class bowling average in 2001 was 51.50, 18.90 in 2002, and 27.26 in 2003. His performances in one-day cricket remained more consistent. The 2003 season was also one of Cork's most controversial. Following a Twenty20 fixture against Leicestershire in the Twenty20 Cup, Cork branded Australian Brad Hodge a cheat after he appeared to catch Steven Selwood after crossing the boundary rope. He also branded the response of the England and Wales Cricket Board's chief executive, Tim Lamb, as "pathetic". Following the remarks, Hodge considered legal action. The England and Wales Cricket Board took action, summoning Cork to a hearing where they fined him £1,000 and banned him for three matches. The three match ban was suspended for a year. With Derbyshire rooted to the bottom of the County Championship Division Two table at the end of the season and coupled with the internal issues at Derbyshire, including incoming Director of Cricket David Houghton's refusal to confirm him as captain for 2004, Cork requested to be released from the remainder of his three-year contract extension agreed only at the beginning of the 2003 season. His release was granted by the county.

In the period from 1990 to 2003, Cork played 158 first-class matches for the county, scoring 5,870 runs at a batting average of 28.08, with five centuries and thirty-five half centuries. In the field he claimed 125 catches. With the ball he took 505 wickets at a bowling average of 25.76, with 22 five wicket hauls, 5 ten wicket hauls, and with career best innings figures of 9/53. His record in List A cricket for the county was equally as impressive, playing 184 matches and scoring 2,947 runs at an average of 22.49, with sixteen half centuries and a high score of 93. In the field he took 83 catches. With the ball he claimed 234 wickets at an average of 26.05, with four five wicket hauls and best figures of 6/21, which remain his best figures. He formed key bowling partnerships with teammates Phil DeFreitas, Devon Malcolm and Ole Mortensen. He has cited Kim Barnett, the first captain he played under at Derbyshire, as the best captain he has played for, regarding him as his "guide and mentor". Indeed, it was Cork's wish to see Barnett return to the county in an administration capacity which played a part in Cork's downfall at the county.

=== Lancashire ===
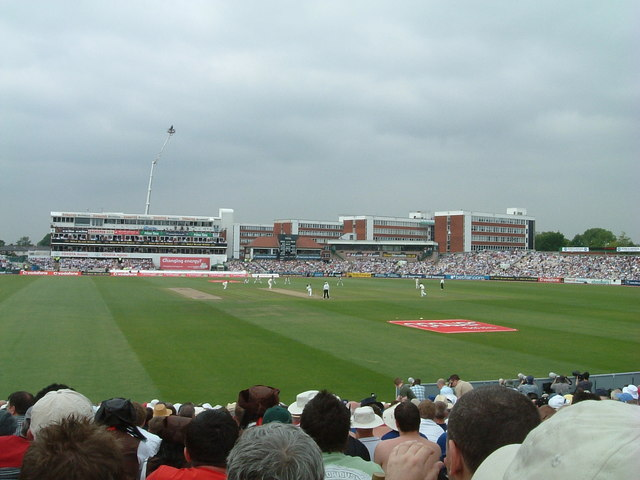
Old Trafford, where Cork played for Lancashire from 2004 to 2008

Following his release from his Derbyshire contract, Cork joined Lancashire for the 2004 season. After surgery on a troublesome ankle injury, Cork joined the county in their pre-season tour of South Africa before making his debut for the county in a County Championship match against Northamptonshire. Cork's early days at his new county brought mixed fortunes, suffering a loss of form in 2004, coupled with relegation from Division One of the County Championship. Cork's maiden season with Lancashire did see him play a role in taking them to finals day in the Twenty20 Cup at Edgbaston, where he played in their semi-final defeat by Surrey. He was awarded his county cap in 2004. The county were promoted back to Division One the following season, a season in which Cork took 46 first-class wickets at 26, and 17 List A wickets at an average 27.47. This season was a marked improvement on Cork's debut season for Lancashire. In 2006, Lancashire mounted a challenge for the County Championship, with Cork taking 42 wickets at an average of 25.50. Lancashire were eventually beaten to the title by Sussex. Cork also played a key role in Lancashire's run to the final of the 2006 Cheltenham & Gloucester Trophy, where they played Sussex. Opening the bowling with Kyle Hogg, Cork did not take any Sussex wickets, but did run-out Richard Montgomerie and Carl Hopkinson. His not out 35 in Lancashire's innings was in vain as Sussex ran out winners by 15 runs in a low scoring match.

Cork was banned for the first 50-over game of 2007 after an incident at the previous season's final against Sussex, and was fined £2,500. This was later reduced to £500 on appeal. The 2007 season panned out in a similar fashion to the previous season's County Championship, with the fight for the title, again with Sussex, going down to the final day of the season. Playing Surrey at The Oval, Lancashire required nothing less than a victory to claim the title. Chasing 489 runs to win, Cork struck a dogged 47 in Lancashire's second-innings, as they ultimately fell short of their target by 25 runs. Seemingly falling down the pecking order at Lancashire, Cork did not feature in any one-day matches in the 2008 and only played a handful of County Championship matches. On 12 August 2008 it was announced that Lancashire would not be renewing Cork's contract for the 2009 season. While Cork said that "it hurts, decisions like this", he also said that he intended to continue playing cricket at the highest level that he could. Lancashire captain Stuart Law stated that he had not been consulted about the decision and wanted Cork to stay at the club. The club released a statement saying Cork was released "with the longer-term development of the playing staff in mind and to allow the side to evolve". The decision to release Cork was criticised by Lancashire and England all-rounder Andrew Flintoff.

In his five seasons with Lancashire, Cork played 64 first-class matches, scoring 1,822 runs at an average of 24.95, with three centuries, eight half centuries and a high score 154. Meanwhile, in the field he took 49 catches. On Old Trafford pitches typically suited to pace and bounce, he took 173 wickets at a bowling average of 28.29, with four five wickets hauls and best innings figures of 7/120. In List A cricket he played 57 matches, scoring 749 runs at an average of 22.69, with two half centuries and a high score 57. In the field he took 15 catches. With the ball he took 58 wickets at an average of 28.98, with best figures of 4/14. Cork had left Derbyshire after the first season of Twenty20 cricket, so with Lancashire he had more exposure to the format. He scored 259 runs for Lancashire at an average of 13.63, with a high score of 28. With the ball he took 26 wickets at an average of 22.72, with best figures of 4/16.

=== Hampshire ===
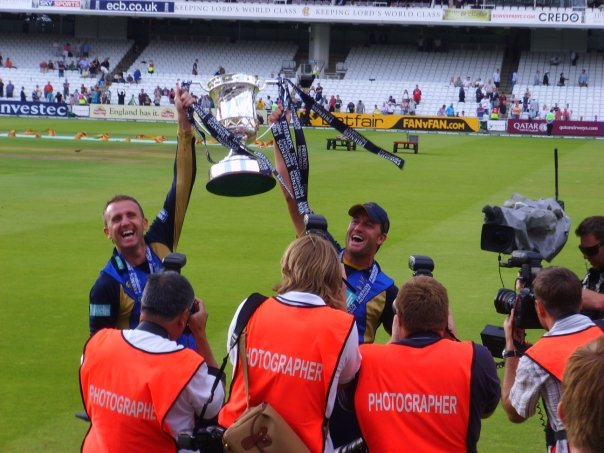
Cork (left) and Sean Ervine hold aloft the 2009 Friends Provident Trophy at Lord's

On 2 October 2008 he joined Hampshire after signing a two-year deal, making his debut against Worcestershire in the 2009 County Championship at the Rose Bowl. Having been a key part of the Hampshire squad throughout the 2009 Friends Provident Trophy, where he played a part in guiding them to the final. In the final Cork helped Hampshire to a 6 wicket win. Cork was man-of-the-match, 16 years after his man-of-the-match performance for Derbyshire in the 1993 Benson & Hedges Cup final. Cork took figures of 4/41, including the wickets of England wicket-keeper Matt Prior for a second ball duck and Pakistan international Yasir Arafat. Cork's first season was a qualified success, with him taking 62 wickets in all formats. His first season form played a part in helping Hampshire to a late season rally after being within the Division One relegation zone for most of the season.

With Dimitri Mascarenhas injured for the large part of the 2010 season, Cork took over the captaincy when Nic Pothas stood down following a run of poor results. During the 2010 season, Cork led the side to victory in the 2010 Friends Provident t20 finals day at the home of Hampshire cricket, the Rose Bowl. During the final itself he took the wickets of Jos Buttler and Arul Suppiah, as well as hitting West Indian all-rounder Kieron Pollard in the eye with a bouncer, which led to Pollard needing hospital treatment. Cork was praised for his sportsmanship during the incident. Following the match, Cork was offered a new one-year deal by Hampshire, a deal he stated he was likely to sign but a decision he would still nonetheless consider over the coming weeks. In October it was confirmed that Cork had signed a one-year contract extension taking him into the 2011 season, which would be his 21st in first-class cricket. Cork was also given the captaincy for the 2011 season on a permanent basis.

Provided Cork had a successful 2011 season, then he would be set to reach the all-rounders' double of 1,000 wickets and 10,000 runs in first-class cricket. Cork hit his 10,000th run in Hampshires' County Championship match against Yorkshire at Headingley, off the bowling of Ajmal Shahzad. Under Cork's captaincy, Hampshire started poorly in the County Championship, where they sat second bottom without any wins, while in one-day cricket they have fared little better. However Hampshire saw a turn around in fortunes, be it in the Friends Life t20, with Cork captaining them to five wins out of five, guiding them to their second successive finals day. On finals day, they lost in the semi-final against Somerset. Cork's form though continued to dip as the season progressed, towards the end of the 2011 season he took a break to look after his father who had been diagnosed with cancer and given a matter of weeks to live. Following Twenty20 finals days, he paid an emotional tribute to his father who died days before. On 10 September, it was announced that Hampshire would be releasing Cork at the end of the 2011 season. A fortnight later he announced his retirement from the game after 21 seasons in first-class cricket, with Cork falling just short of 1,000 first-class wickets; he ended his first-class career instead with 989.

== Achievements ==
=== Wisden Cricketer of the Year ===
He was chosen as one of the five Wisden Cricketer of the Year in 1996, alongside England teammates Angus Fraser and Dermot Reeve. In their rationale, Wisden described his arrival in Test cricket as "without question, the most explosive entrance in living memory".

== Personal life ==
Cork married his first wife Jane when he was 22, but the pressures of being away on international duty led to his marriage ending in divorce. Cork has one son from that marriage, Greg, who made his debut for Derbyshire in 2014, playing four Twenty20 matches after joining the county's Academy. His son is also an all-rounder.

Cork lives in Derby and is married to his second wife, Donna, five years his senior. He is a lifelong supporter of Stoke City F.C.

Cork regularly commentates on the game for Sky Sports. He was one of the people caught up in the 2009 attack on the Sri Lanka national cricket team, when he was commentating on Sri Lanka's tour of Pakistan for the Pakistan Television Corporation. He criticised Pakistan Cricket Board chief Ijaz Butt following his remarks that match referee Chris Broad had fabricated elements of the attack. Cork also commentates on the Indian Premier League. In February 2010 Cork made his debut as a summariser on Test Match Special when England toured Bangladesh. In December 2010, Cork was named as one of the contestants for series 6 of Dancing on Ice with Finnish figure skater Alexandra Schauman. He was eliminated in week four after being voted off by his six of his fellow contestants, following a skate-off with presenter Jeff Brazier.

Politically, Cork is a Conservative.

Cork's father was taken to hospital after suffering a heart attack in July 2011, while receiving treatment in hospital he was diagnosed with cancer and given just three weeks to live. Cork took a break from playing for Hampshire to be with his father in his final days, with Gerald dying on 13 August.

Sporting positions
Preceded by Dean Jones & Phil DeFreitas	Derbyshire cricket captains 1998–2003	Succeeded by Luke Sutton
Preceded by Dimitri Mascarenhas Nic Pothas	Hampshire cricket captains 2009–2010 deputising for Dimitri Mascarenhas	Succeeded by James Adams
Preceded by James Adams	Hampshire cricket captains 2011	Succeeded by James Adams
