= Mayank Tehlan =

Indian cricketer (born 1986)

Personal information
- Born: 11 October 1986 (age 40); Delhi, India
- Batting: Right-handed
- Bowling: Right-arm off break

Domestic team information
- Years: Team
- 2003/04–2010/11: Delhi
- FC debut: 9 December 2005 Delhi v Maharashtra
- Last FC: 15 December 2010 Delhi v Mumbai
- LA debut: 9 February 2004 Delhi v Tamil Nadu
- Last LA: 3 March 2008 Delhi v Haryana

Career statistics
Competition	FC	LA	T20
Matches	27	10	6
Runs scored	1,178	114	53
Batting average	30.20	16.28	17.66
100s/50s	3/3	0/0	0/0
Top score	200	45	25*
Balls bowled	216	5	–
Wickets	1	–	–
Bowling average	93.00	–	–
5 wickets in innings	0	–	–
10 wickets in match	0	–	–
Best bowling	1/56	–	–
Catches/stumpings	15/–	1/–	0/–
- Source: ESPNcricinfo, 20 July 2013

Mayank Tehlan (born 11 October 1986) is an Indian former cricketer who played for Delhi. He was born in Delhi. He was bought by Delhi Daredevils for the 2008 Indian Premier League. He played for India Under-19 cricket team, and was a part of the squad for the 2006 ICC Under-19 Cricket World Cup.
