= Greg Wood (cricketer) =

English cricketer (born 1988)

Personal information
- Full name: Gregory Luke Wood
- Born: 2 December 1988 (age 37); Dewsbury, West Yorkshire, England
- Height: 5 ft 11 in (1.80 m)
- Batting: Left-handed
- Role: Wicket-keeper

Domestic team information
- Years: Team
- 2007: Yorkshire (squad no. 6)
- Only List A: 31 July 2007 Yorkshire v Sri Lanka A

Career statistics
Competition	List A
Matches	1
Runs scored	26
Batting average	26.00
100s/50s	0/0
Top score	26
Catches/stumpings	0/–
- Source: CricketArchive, 1 August 2016

Gregory Luke Wood (born 2 December 1988 in Dewsbury, West Yorkshire, England) is an English cricketer, who played for England in the 2006 U-19 Cricket World Cup in Sri Lanka. He played one List A match for Yorkshire County Cricket Club in 2007, before leaving the club prior to start of the 2009 season.

He is a left-handed batsman and wicket-keeper who impressed for England U-19s and Yorkshire Second XI. He won the Denis Compton award in 2005. Progressing through league cricket and the Yorkshire Academy, he was an integral part of the Yorkshire U-17 side, that beat Surrey in the final of the 2005 ECB U-17 version of the County Championship.
