= Ravikant Shukla =

Indian cricketer (born 1987)

Personal information
- Born: 7 July 1987 (age 39); Raebareli, Uttar Pradesh, India
- Nickname: Ravi
- Batting: Left-handed
- Bowling: Right-arm medium-fast
- Role: Batsman

Domestic team information
- Years: Team
- 2005-2012: Uttar Pradesh
- 2012-2014: Goa

Career statistics
Competition	FC	LA	T20
Matches	40	37	15
Runs scored	1,962	916	245
Batting average	35.03	32.71	17.50
100s/50s	2/12	0/7	0/0
Top score	135	94*	39
Balls bowled	180	6	6
Wickets	1	0	0
Bowling average	83.00	–	–
5 wickets in innings	0	–	–
10 wickets in match	0	–	–
Best bowling	1/31	–	–
Catches/stumpings	37/0	19/0	8/0

Ravikant Udaybhan Shukla (born 9 July 1987) is a former Indian first-class cricketer.

== Career ==
Shukla played at the U-16 and U-19 cricket for Uttar Pradesh cricket team. He captained the India U19 national cricket team at the 2006 U-19 Cricket World Cup where India emerged as runners-up to Pakistan in the final. During the tournament, he scored 53 runs in 6 matches.

Shukla made his first-class debut at the age of 18 for Uttar Pradesh.
