= Hamza Almuzahim =

Ugandan cricketer

Personal information
- Full name: Hamza Saleh Almuzahim
- Born: 20 April 1986 (age 40); Jinja, Uganda
- Batting: Right-handed
- Bowling: Right-arm off break

Career statistics
Competition	FC	LA	T20
Matches	1	20	8
Runs scored	38	230	94
Batting average	19.00	12.77	11.75
100s/50s	–/–	–/–	–/–
Top score	20	45*	45
Balls bowled	0	6	24
Wickets	–	0	0
Bowling average	–	–	–
5 wickets in innings	–	–	–
10 wickets in match	–	–	–
Best bowling	–	–	–
Catches/stumpings	–/–	4/–	–/–
- Source: Cricinfo, 1 February 2022

Hamza Saleh Almuzahim (born 12 April 1986) is a Ugandan former cricketer.

Almuzahim was born at Jinja in April 1986. Almuzahim captained the Uganda Under-19 cricket team in the 2004 Under-19 Cricket World Cup. The following year he was included in the senior Uganda squad for the ICC Trophy in Ireland, during which he made his List A one-day debut against the United States, making an unbeaten 45 runs to guide Uganda to a 6-wicket victory. He made a total of five appearances during the tournament. The following year he once again captained the Uganda Under-19 team in the 2006 Under-19 Cricket World Cup, with Uganda finishing in 14th place.

After a gap of five years, Almuzahim was recalled to the Ugandan squad for their Intercontinental Shield match against Namibia, in which he made his first-class debut. He also played in a one-day match on the tour, in addition to making his Twenty20 debut. He played in four more one-day matches in 2010, against Kenya. The following year he was selected in the Ugandan squad for the World Cricket League Division Two, playing in five matches during the tournament. In November 2013, he was named in the Ugandan squad for the ICC World Twenty20 Qualifier, with him playing in seven matches during the qualifier. The following year he played for Uganda in the 2014 Cricket World Cup Qualifier in New Zealand, playing in six one-day matches during the qualifier. In total, Almuzahim played in twenty List A one-day matches for Uganda, scoring 230 runs at an average of 12.77 and with a highest score of 45 not out. In eight Twenty20 matches, he scored 94 runs at an average of 11.75, and a highest score of 45.
