= Romano Ramoo =

South African cricketer (born 1987)

Personal information
- Born: 25 April 1987 (age 39); East London, South Africa
- Batting: Right-handed
- Bowling: Right arm medium
- Source: Cricinfo, 12 December 2020

Romano Ramoo (born 25 April 1987) is a South African cricketer. He played in 34 first-class, 36 List A, and 10 Twenty20 matches from 2008 to 2014.
