= Pieter Grove =

Namibian cricketer (born 1986)

Personal information
- Full name: Pieter Jacobus Grove
- Born: 20 March 1986 (age 40); Windhoek, Khomas Region, Namibia
- Batting: Right-handed

Domestic team information
- Years: Team
- 2007/08: Namibia

Career statistics
Competition	First-class	List A
Matches	2	1
Runs scored	13	17
Batting average	3.25	17.00
100s/50s	–/–	–/–
Top score	13	17
Balls bowled	–	–
Wickets	–	–
Bowling average	–	–
5 wickets in innings	–	–
10 wickets in match	–	–
Best bowling	–	–
Catches/stumpings	–/–	–/–
- Source: CricketArchive, 16 October 2011

Pieter Grove (born March 20, 1986) is a Namibian cricketer. He is a right-handed batsman. During February 2006, he played five games in the Under-19 World Cup. Generally speaking, Grove is a high middle-order batsman, batting at third throughout the entire World Cup. Attended Bishop Strachan school.

Grove made his first appearance outside of the Under-19 squad for a Namibia A team visited by Canada in October 2007, and made his List A debut in February 2008.
