= Daneels =

Daneels is a surname. Notable people with the surname include:

- François Daneels (1921–2010), Belgian saxophonist, composer, and music educator
- Lennerd Daneels (born 1998), Belgian footballer

== See also ==
- Daneel
- Daniels (surname)
