= Brett Thompson (cricketer) =

South African cricketer (born 1987)

Brett Thompson (born 23 October 1987 in East London, South Africa) is a South African cricketer who played in the 2006 Under-19 Cricket World Cup for the South Africa in Sri Lanka.
