= Pieter Daneel =

South African cricketer (born 1987)

Pieter Daneel (born 19 March 1987 in Stellenbosch) is a South African cricketer and businessman.

Daneel was educated at Paul Roos Gymnasium in Stellenbosch and Stellenbosch University. He played in the 2006 U-19 Cricket World Cup in Sri Lanka. In 2006–07, he played first-class and List A cricket for Boland.

Daneel worked in banking as a chartered accountant in Johannesburg and London before taking charge of his family's jewellery manufacturing business in Cape Town. He gained a Professor Jochen Runde Scholarship to study for an MBA at Jesus College, Cambridge in 2019–20. He played for Cambridge University in the 2020 University match, scoring a century in the second innings. His was the only century in the 175th and final first-class University match.
