= Ewald Steenkamp =

Namibian cricketer (born 1988)

Personal information
- Born: 18 April 1988 (age 38); Windhoek, Namibia
- Batting: Right-handed
- Role: Wicket-keeper

Domestic team information
- Years: Team
- 2007/08–2011/12: Namibia

Career statistics
Competition	FC	LA	T20
Matches	14	27	13
Runs scored	755	458	77
Batting average	32.82	16.96	12.83
100s/50s	1/4	0/2	0/0
Top score	206	80	36
Catches/stumpings	19/0	30/1	8/6
- Source: CricketArchive, 27 January 2025

Ewald Steenkamp (born 18 April 1988) is a Namibian former cricketer. Steenkamp is a right-handed batsman who played as a wicket-keeper. He played five matches in the Under-19 World Cup of February 2006, during which he top-scored with 17.

In August 2007, Steenkamp was a part of the Namibia Under-19 squad which won the Africa Under-19 Championship, during which he scored a then career-best 82 not out against Kenya.

Steenkamp's debut first-class appearance came in the South African Airways Provincial Challenge against Griqualand West in November 2007. Despite not making any first-class appearances in 2008–09, Steenkamp made his debut first-class half-century in 2009–10.
