= Morné Engelbrecht =

South African-born Namibian cricketer

Personal information
- Full name: Morne Engelbrecht
- Born: 13 August 1988 (age 38); Empangeni, Natal Province, South Africa
- Batting: Right-handed
- Bowling: Right-arm fast-medium

International information
- National side: Namibia

Career statistics
Competition	Twenty20
Matches	1
Runs scored	1
Batting average	1.00
100s/50s	–/–
Top score	1
Balls bowled	6
Wickets	–
Bowling average	–
5 wickets in innings	–
10 wickets in match	–
Best bowling	–
Catches/stumpings	–/–
- Source: CricketArchive, 16 October 2011

Morné Engelbrecht (born 13 August 1988) is a South African-born Namibian cricketer. He is a right-handed batsman and a right-arm medium-fast bowler. He has played for the Namibian Under-19s cricket team since January 2006, when he played in the Under-19s World Cup, generally as a substitute for Jason Bandlow.

Engelbrecht was part of the Namibian Under-19 team which won the Under-19 African Championship in 2007.
