= Sumithra Warnakulasuriya =

Sri Lankan cricketer

Personal information
- Born: 25 March 1962 (age 64); Maharagama, Colombo, Sri Lanka
- Batting: Right-handed
- Bowling: Right-arm medium-pace

Career statistics
Competition	FC	List A
Matches	16	5
Runs scored	789	127
Batting average	37.57	31.75
100s/50s	1/5	0/1
Top score	174*	82*
Balls bowled	24	42
Wickets	0	1
Bowling average	–	40.00
5 wickets in innings	0	0
10 wickets in match	0	n/a
Best bowling	–	1/25
Catches/stumpings	7/–	1/–
- Source: Cricinfo, 13 March 2018

Sumithra Warnakulasuriya (born 25 March 1962) is a former Sri Lankan cricketer.

Warnakulasuriya attended Royal College, Colombo from 1968 to 1982. In 1982 he was the school's head prefect and captain of the cricket team. In the 1980 Royal–Thomian match he scored 197, a record for the contest.

An opening batsman, Warnakulasuriya played 16 matches of first-class cricket for various Sri Lankan national teams between 1982 and 1986 but was unable to break into the Test team. He toured Pakistan with the Sri Lanka under-23s team in January-February 1984, playing in all three matches against Pakistan under-23s and scoring 182 runs at an average of 36.40. Overall, his highest first-class score was 174 not out off 419 balls for a Sri Lanka Colts XI against the touring Indian side in August 1985.

Warnakulasuriya later coached in Bangladesh before returning to Sri Lanka to coach the national under-19 team.
