= Jason Donnelly (cricketer) =

New Zealand cricketer (born 1987)

Personal information
- Born: 24 April 1987 (age 39); Auckland, New Zealand
- Source: Cricinfo, 15 October 2020

Jason Donnelly (born 24 April 1987) is a New Zealand cricketer. He played in eleven first-class matches for Canterbury and Northern Districts from 2009 to 2012.
