= Hendrik Marx =

Namibian cricketer (1989–2010)

Personal information
- Full name: Hendrik Jacobus Marx
- Born: 14 November 1989; Windhoek, Namibia
- Died: 15 July 2010 (aged 20); Windhoek, Namibia
- Batting: Right-handed
- Bowling: Right-arm medium-fast

International information
- National side: Namibia

Domestic team information
- Years: Team
- 2008/09: Namibia

Career statistics
Competition	First-class	List A
Matches	1	1
Runs scored	20	16
Batting average	10.00	–
100s/50s	0/0	0/0
Top score	20	16
Balls bowled	120	18
Wickets	–	0
Bowling average	–	–
5 wickets in innings	–	–
10 wickets in match	–	–
Best bowling	–	–
Catches/stumpings	0/–	0/–
- Source: ESPNCricinfo, 16 October 2011

Hendrik Jacobus Marx (14 November 1989 – 15 July 2010) was a Namibian cricketer. He was a right-handed batsman and a right-arm medium-fast bowler who played for the Namibian Under-19s cricket team since 2006, when he played in the Under-19s World Cup. He played cricket for WHS, Windhoek high school. He played rugby for WHS and converted the kick that won them the national title in his matric year, 2008.

Marx went to the university of Stellenbosch and continue to play cricket for maties and residence, huis Visser. He was studying a bachelor of commerce in financial accounting at Stellenbosch university.

Marx was part of the Namibian Under-19 team which won the Under-19 African Championship in 2007.

Marx made his first-class debut in February 2009 against Border. He played in Namibia's final world cup qualifier on 19 April in 2009 against the U.A.E in the 7th place play-off. U.A.E won by 4 wickets. Marx bowled and batted, 16 runs and not out.

On 15 July 2010, Marx died in a car accident in Windhoek, Namibia. He drove too fast over a speedbump and rolled his ford fiesta. He was not wearing a seatbelt and he was thrown from the car; this broke his neck and he died instantly. He had spent the night before drinking at local restaurant, Luigi and the fish. He was on his way to friend's house to continue the party. He was such a well like man that there were two packed funerals, one in Windhoek at N.G. Kerk Windhoek-Oos and one in Stellenbosch at Kruiskerk. He left behind parents, siblings, and a beautiful fiancé.
