= Chris Whelan =

English cricketer

Personal information
- Full name: Christopher David Whelan
- Born: 8 May 1986 (age 40); Liverpool, England
- Batting: Right-handed
- Bowling: Right arm medium

Domestic team information
- Years: Team
- 2004–2007: Middlesex
- 2008–2011: Worcestershire

Career statistics
Competition	FC	LA
Matches	19	20
Runs scored	252	40
Batting average	14.00	5.00
100s/50s	0/1	0/0
Top score	58	11
Balls bowled	1930	588
Wickets	41	21
Bowling average	36.80	28.47
5 wickets in innings	1	0
10 wickets in match	0	n/a
Best bowling	5–95	4–27
Catches/stumpings	3/0	4/0
- Source: CricketArchive, 26 July 2009

Christopher David Whelan (born 8 May 1986) is an English first-class cricketer. He is a right-handed batsman and a right-arm medium bowler, who has represented Middlesex and Worcestershire. He came through the ranks at Sefton Park CC, taking a 1st XI hat-trick at Lytham aged 16, and scored a record 177 not out for his school, St Margaret's, in an under-15 final.

Whelan played for Middlesex's second team in 2003, but made his List A debut on 2 September 2004, when he appeared against Sussex in a totesport League game at Hove. In a crushing 135-run defeat, Whelan's success was very limited: he returned an analysis of 7–0–40–0 and scored 6 at the bottom of the order (by which time Middlesex's cause had long since been lost).

Early in 2005, Whelan was named by the Liverpool Echo as Merseyside Young Sports Personality of the Year. He was quoted by the newspaper as saying that he had been encouraged by John Emburey. In early May, he made his first-class debut in a County Championship match against Hampshire at Southampton, and took three wickets. His first victim was Zimbabwe international Sean Ervine, whose wicket he claimed in both innings. He also turned out against Cambridge UCCE at the start of June, but made no other first-team appearances that season.

In 2006 Whelan made a solitary List A appearance, this coming against Nottinghamshire. The following summer he managed three List A games and one first-class outing against Oxford UCCE, though he never managed more than two wickets in an innings. After the 2007 season, he left Middlesex and moved to Worcestershire. He told the Liverpool Echo in 2008 that he had become "stale" at Middlesex, and that he had thought the county "a very political place with a lot of favourites around the dressing room."

Whelan enjoyed an immediate run in the Worcestershire first team in first-class and one-day cricket. Although he again could not claim more than two wickets in any innings, on his return to the second team for the local derby with Warwickshire seconds, he produced an outstanding performance. Whelan took 6–79 in the first innings, then followed that up with 6–22 (for match figures of 12–101) to help dismiss Warwickshire for a mere 77 and set up a 53-run Worcestershire victory. Whelan then returned to first-team action, and in June returned his best List A figures of 4–78 against the New Zealanders at Worcester.
