= Siraj Ullah Khadem =

Bangladeshi cricketer (born 1988)

Sirajullah Khadim
Personal information
- Full name: Sirajullah Khadim
- Born: 10 June 1988 (age 38); Brahmanbaria, Bangladesh
- Batting: Left-handed
- Bowling: Left-arm fast-medium

International information
- National side: Portugal
- T20I debut (cap 18): 19 August 2021 v Malta
- Last T20I: 4 July 2022 v Denmark

Domestic team information
- Years: Team
- 2005–2009: Sylhet Division

Career statistics
Competition	T20I	FC	LA
Matches	23	6	8
Runs scored	75	89	89
Batting average	10.71	8.90	12.71
100s/50s	0/0	0/0	0/0
Top score	22	29	37
Balls bowled	470	300	84
Wickets	35	1	1
Bowling average	12.05	174.00	57.00
5 wickets in innings	1	0	0
10 wickets in match	0	0	0
Best bowling	5/17	1/77	1/12
Catches/stumpings	2/–	0/–	6/–
- Source: Cricinfo, 14 August 2024

Sirajullah Khadim (born 10 June 1988) is a Bangladeshi cricketer who plays for the Portugal national cricket team. He previously played domestic cricket for Sylhet Division.

== Personal life ==
Khadim was born on 10 June 1988 in Brahmanbaria. He immigrated to Lisbon in 2014.

== Bangladesh career ==
Khadim was admitted to the Bangladesh Krira Shikkha Protishtan in 2001 and represented Bangladesh at the under-15, under-17 and under-19 levels. He played for the Bangladesh under-19 cricket team at the 2006 Under-19 Cricket World Cup in Sri Lanka.

Khadim made his debut for Sylhet Division in 2005. He played for Mohammedan SC at the age of 18. In 2009, while practising for the Dhaka Premier League, he received a serious eye injury which led to the end of his career in Bangladesh.

== Portugal career ==
In August 2021, he was named in Portugal's Twenty20 International (T20I) squad for the 2021 Portugal Tri-Nation Series tournament. He made his Twenty20 International (T20I) debut for Portugal, against Malta, on 19 August 2021, helping his team to victory with 2 wickets for 28 runs.
