= Shaun Fitzgibbon =

New Zealand cricketer (born 1986)

Personal information
- Full name: Shaun Matthew Fitzgibbon
- Born: 24 September 1986 (age 39); Invercargill, Southland, New Zealand

Domestic team information
- Years: Team
- 2004/05–2022/23: Southland
- 2014/15: Otago
- Source: CricInfo, 9 May 2016

Shaun Matthew Fitzgibbon (born 24 September 1986) is a New Zealand cricketer. He played Hawke Cup cricket for Southland between the 2004–05 and 2022–23 seasons, captaining the side towards the end of his representative career. He made a single Twenty20 cricket appearance for Otago during the 2014–15 season.
