= Andrew Miller (cricketer, born 1987) =

English cricketer

Personal information
- Full name: Andrew Stephen Miller
- Born: 27 September 1987 (age 39); Preston, Lancashire, England
- Height: 6 ft 4 in (1.93 m)
- Batting: Right-handed
- Bowling: Right-arm fast-medium

Domestic team information
- Years: Team
- 2006–2012: Warwickshire
- 2013: Sussex (squad no. 21)

Career statistics
Competition	FC	LA	T20
Matches	19	8	4
Runs scored	85	4	0
Batting average	6.07	4.00	–
100s/50s	0/0	0/0	0/0
Top score	35	2*	0*
Balls bowled	2,554	305	66
Wickets	35	9	4
Bowling average	38.97	28.44	22.50
5 wickets in innings	2	0	0
10 wickets in match	0	0	0
Best bowling	5/58	2/24	2/16
Catches/stumpings	5/–	1/–	2/–
- Source: ESPNcricinfo, 25 April 2017

Andrew Stephen Miller (born 27 September 1987) is an English cricketer. He is a right-handed batsman who bowls right-arm fast-medium. He was born at Preston, Lancashire.He has a brother called Peter and a cousin called Peter Millermetre.

== Professional career ==
Miller made his first-class debut for Warwickshire against Bangladesh A in 2008. His County Championship debut came the following year, against Hampshire. He represented Warwickshire in 18 first-class matches, scoring 85 runs at a batting average of 6.07, with a high score of 35. With the ball he took 35 wickets at a bowling average of 36.05, with best figures of 5/58.

He is also a commentator for cricket-news website ESPNcricinfo.
