= Kanishka Chaugai =

Nepalese-American cricketer

Personal information
- Born: 24 January 1986 (age 40); Nepal
- Batting: Right-handed
- Bowling: Right-arm medium
- Role: Batsman

Career statistics
Competition	First-class
Matches	2
Runs scored	101
Batting average	33.66
100s/50s	0/0
Top score	48
Catches/stumpings	3/0
- Source: CricketArchive, 8 March 2008

Kanishka Chaugai (born 24 January 1986) is a Nepalese-born American cricketer, who currently plays for Minor League Cricket team Hollywood Master Blasters in American domestic tournaments. A right-handed batsman and right-arm medium pace bowler, he previously represented for the Nepal national cricket team in 2004.

== Biography ==
Born in Nepal in 1986, Kanishka Chaugai first played for Nepal at Under-17 level when he played in the ICC Under-17 Asia Cup in Pakistan in 2000. He played in the ACC Under-17 Asia Cup in Bangladesh the following year before playing at Under-19 level for the first time in the 2002 Under-19 World Cup in New Zealand.

In 2003, he played three matches for Nepal Under-19s against India Under-19s before playing in the Youth Asia Cup in Pakistan. He played in a second Under-19 World Cup in Bangladesh in 2004 and made his début for the Nepal senior team that year when he played in an ACC Fast Track Countries Tournament match against Hong Kong.

Remaining in the senior team, in early 2005 he played in the repêchage tournament of the 2005 ICC Trophy, in which Nepal finished third after beating Qatar in a play-off. He also played ACC Fast Track Countries Tournament matches against Singapore, Malaysia, the UAE and Hong Kong. The games against the UAE and Hong Kong also counted towards the 2005 ICC Intercontinental Cup and are his only first-class matches to date.

Returning to the Under-19 team, he captained Nepal Under-19s in the 2006 Under-19 World Cup in Sri Lanka, leading them to the Plate Championship final where they beat New Zealand. Chaugai had won the man of the match award in the plate semi-final where Nepal beat South Africa by 2 runs. He most recently played for the senior team in a play-off match against Namibia to decide the final spot in the 2006 ICC Intercontinental Cup. Needing an outright win to qualify, Nepal could only secure a draw after there was no play on the first day.

Late in 2006, Kaniska Chaugai left Nepal and Nepali cricket team to seek future in the United States. In June 2021, he was selected to take part in the Minor League Cricket tournament in the United States following the players' draft.
