= Mark Nelson (cricketer) =

English cricketer (born 1986)

Personal information
- Full name: Mark Anthony George Nelson
- Born: 24 September 1986 (age 40); Milton Keynes, Buckinghamshire, England
- Batting: Left-handed
- Bowling: Right-arm medium
- Role: All-rounder

Domestic team information
- Years: Team
- 2006–2009: Northamptonshire (squad no. 21)
- 2010: Bedfordshire

Career statistics
Competition	FC	LA	T20
Matches	7	13	6
Runs scored	195	213	23
Batting average	17.72	23.66	7.66
100s/50s	0/0	0/1	0/0
Top score	42	74	13
Balls bowled	96	94	–
Wickets	2	2	–
Bowling average	62.00	50.00	–
5 wickets in innings	0	0	–
10 wickets in match	0	0	–
Best bowling	2/62	1/26	–
Catches/stumpings	2/–	0/–	2/–
- Source: ESPNcricinfo, 25 April 2017

Mark Anthony George Nelson (born 24 September 1986) is an English cricket player who has represented Northamptonshire. He is a left-handed batsman who bowls right-arm medium pace.

He previously played for England in the 2006 U-19 Cricket World Cup in Sri Lanka, having previously playing at under 16's and 17's cricket for the side.

Nelson was released by the county at the end of the 2009 season.
