= Stephanus Ackermann =

Namibian cricketer (born 1985)

Personal information
- Full name: Stephanus Theodorus Ackermann
- Born: 26 December 1985 (age 40); Windhoek, Khomas Region, Namibia
- Batting: Right-handed
- Bowling: Right-arm medium

International information
- National side: Namibia

Domestic team information
- Years: Team
- 2004/05–2008/09: Namibia

Career statistics
Competition	First-class	List A
Matches	3	4
Runs scored	139	66
Batting average	23.16	22.00
100s/50s	–/1	–/–
Top score	57	26
Balls bowled	–	–
Wickets	–	–
Bowling average	–	–
5 wickets in innings	–	–
10 wickets in match	–	–
Best bowling	–	–
Catches/stumpings	1/–	1/–
- Source: CricketArchive (subscription required), 16 October 2011

Stephanus Ackermann (born December 26, 1985) is a Namibian cricketer, who has played for Namibia's national cricket team. He is a right-handed batsman and a right-arm medium-pace bowler. He was born in Windhoek and has played one-day cricket for the Namibian youth team since 2005. He played in the Under-19 World Cup for Namibia in 2006.

Ackermann is generally used as a lower-middle order batsman, but has not been much used by his team in their bowling attack. Ackermann made an appearance for the Namibia A team in October 2007, his first appearance for the Namibians since the Youth World Cup.

Ackermann made his first-class debut in October 2008, against North West.
