= Sean Weeraratna =

Scottish cricketer (born 1985)

Sean Dinesh Weeraratna (born 21 November 1985) is a Scottish cricketer of Sri Lankan origin who was born in Lesotho.

He was born in Lesotho, to parents from Sri Lanka.

Weeraratna is an allrounder who bowls right-arm medium-fast and has represented Scotland in every age level, including the 2004 and 2006 Under-19 World Cups.

He made his first-class debut against Ireland during the 2005 ICC Intercontinental Cup but didn't play again until the 2007 tournament when he lined up against the UAE.
