= 2006 Under-19 Cricket World Cup =

Cricket tournament

2006 ICC Under-19 Cricket World Cup
- Dates: 5 – 19 February 2006
- Administrator: International Cricket Council
- Cricket format: Limited-overs (50 overs)
- Tournament format(s): Round-robin and knockout
- Host: Sri Lanka
- Champions: Pakistan (2nd title)
- Runners-up: India
- Participants: 16
- Matches: 48
- Player of the series: (India) Cheteshwar Pujara
- Most runs: (India) Cheteshwar Pujara (349)
- Most wickets: (Australia) Moises Henriques (16)

The 2006 ICC Under-19 Cricket World Cup was played in Sri Lanka from 2 to 15 February 2006. It was the sixth edition of the Under-19 Cricket World Cup.

The final was played between the defending champion Pakistan and India in Colombo, which Pakistan won by 38 runs, enabling them to become the first back-to-back champions of the tournament.

== Teams and qualification ==
The ten full members of the International Cricket Council (ICC) qualified automatically:

- Australia
- Bangladesh
- England
- India
- New Zealand
- Pakistan
- South Africa
- Sri Lanka
- West Indies
- Zimbabwe

Another six teams qualified through regional qualification tournaments:

2005 ACC Under-19 Cup

- Nepal (1st place)

2005 Africa/EAP U19 Championship

- Namibia (1st place)
- Uganda (2nd place)

2005 Americas U19 Championship

- United States (1st place)

2005 European U19 Championship

- Scotland (1st place)
- Ireland (2nd place)

== Grounds ==
The matches were played on five grounds in Colombo:

- Nondescripts Cricket Club Ground
- Colombo Cricket Club Ground
- Sinhalese Sports Club Ground
- Paikiasothy Saravanamuttu Stadium
- Ranasinghe Premadasa Stadium

== Group stage ==
=== Group A ===
Pos	Team	Pld	W	L	T	NR	Pts	NRR
1	Bangladesh	3	3	0	0	0	6	2.048
2	Pakistan	3	2	1	0	0	4	2.108
3	New Zealand	3	1	2	0	0	2	−0.631
4	Uganda	3	0	3	0	0	0	−3.253

Source: CricketArchive

=== Group B ===
Pos	Team	Pld	W	L	T	NR	Pts	NRR
1	Australia	3	3	0	0	0	6	2.253
2	West Indies	3	2	1	0	0	4	0.768
3	South Africa	3	1	2	0	0	2	—
4	United States	3	0	3	0	0	0	−2.676

Source: CricketArchive

=== Group C ===
Pos	Team	Pld	W	L	T	NR	Pts	NRR
1	India	3	3	0	0	0	6	2.037
2	Sri Lanka	3	2	1	0	0	4	1.170
3	Namibia	3	1	2	0	0	2	−1.315
4	Scotland	3	0	3	0	0	0	−1.819

Source: CricketArchive

=== Group D ===
Pos	Team	Pld	W	L	T	NR	Pts	NRR
1	Zimbabwe	3	3	0	0	0	6	0.937
2	England	3	2	1	0	0	4	0.454
3	Nepal	3	1	2	0	0	2	−0.127
4	Ireland	3	0	3	0	0	0	−1.264

Source: CricketArchive

== Scorecard ==
No.	Group	Date	Team 1	Captain	Score	Team 2	Captain	Score	Venue	Result
Group Stages schedule
Match 1	A	5 Feb 2006	NZ	Marc Ellison	175(45.3)	BAN	Mushfiqur Rahim	176/7(37.5)	P. Saravanamuttu Stadium	BAN by three wickets
Match 2	B	5 Feb 2006	SA	Dean Elgar	141(34)	AUS	Moises Henriques	316/9(50)	Sinhalese Sports Club Ground	AUS by 175 runs
Match 3	C	5 Feb 2006	SCO	Kasiam Farid	186(49.4)	SL	Angelo Mathews	187/6(39.5)	R. Premadasa Stadium	SL by four wickets
Match 4	D	5 Feb 2006	ZIM	Sean Williams	215/7(44)	IRL	Eoin Morgan	97(29.1)	Nondescripts Cricket Club Ground	ZIM by 118 runs
Match 5	A	6 Feb 2006	PAK	Sarfraz Ahmed	75/2(12.5)	UGA	Hamza Almuzahim	74(33.3)	P. Saravanamuttu Stadium	PAK by eight wickets
Match 6	B	6 Feb 2006	WI	Leon Johnson	302/7(50)	USA	Hemant Punoo	215(45.4)	Nondescripts Cricket Club Ground	WI by 87 runs
Match 7	C	6 Feb 2006	IND	Ravikant Shukla	173/1(27.1)	NAM	Stephanus Ackermann	170(48.5)	R. Premadasa Stadium	IND by nine wickets
Match 8	D	6 Feb 2006	ENG	Moeen Ali	209/9(50)	NEP	Kanishka Chaugai	132(45.2)	Sinhalese Sports Club Ground	ENG by 77 runs
Match 9	A	7 Feb 2006	NZ	Marc Ellison	259/6(50)	UGA	Hamza Almuzahim	137(48.4)	Nondescripts Cricket Club Ground	NZ by 122 runs
Match 10	B	7 Feb 2006	SA	Dean Elgar	227/8(50)	USA	Hemant Punoo	115(29.1)	P. Saravanamuttu Stadium	SA by 162 runs
Match 11	C	7 Feb 2006	SL	Angelo Mathews	263/8(50)	NAM	Stephanus Ackermann	126(38.3)	R. Premadasa Stadium	SL by 137 runs
Match 12	D	7 Feb 2006	ZIM	Sean Williams	201(49.5)	NEP	Kanishka Chaugai	199/9(50)	Colombo Cricket Club Ground	ZIM by two runs
Match 13	A	8 Feb 2006	PAK	Sarfraz Ahmed	170(43.1)	BAN	Mushfiqur Rahim	171/6(34.5)	Nondescripts Cricket Club Ground	BAN by four wickets
Match 14	B	8 Feb 2006	WI	Leon Johnson	238(48)	AUS	Moises Henriques	251(47.5)	Sinhalese Cricket Club Ground	AUS by 13 runs
Match 15	C	8 Feb 2006	IND	Ravikant Shukla	115/2(19)	SCO	Kasiam Farid	112(40.3)	R. Premadasa Stadium	IND by eight wickets
Match 16	D	8 Feb 2006	ENG	Moeen Ali	214(49.4)	IRL	Eoin Morgan	210(50)	Colombo Cricket Club Ground	ENG by four runs
Match 17	A	9 Feb 2006	BAN	Mushfiqur Rahim	255(49.4)	UGA	Hamza Almuzahim	84(33.4)	Sinhalese Sports Club Ground	BAN by 171 runs
Match 18	B	9 Feb 2006	AUS	Moises Henriques	149/6(24.1)	USA	Hemant Punoo	148(42.5)	P. Saravanamuttu Stadium	AUS by four wickets
Match 19	C	9 Feb 2006	SCO	Kasiam Farid	156(48)	NAM	Stephanus Ackermann	160/3(36.3)	Colombo Cricket Club Ground	NAM by seven wickets
Match 20	D	9 Feb 2006	IRL	Eoin Morgan	174(45.3)	NEP	Kanishka Chaugai	234/8(50)	Nondescripts Cricket Club Ground	NEP by 60 runs
Match 21	A	10 Feb 2006	PAK	Sarfraz Ahmed	78/2(9)	NZ	Marc Ellison	77(24)	Sinhalese Sports Club Ground	PAK by eight wickets
Match 22	B	10 Feb 2006	WI	Leon Johnson	218/3(43.1)	SA	Dean Elgar	213/8(50)	P. Saravanamuttu Stadium	WI by seven wickets
Match 23	C	10 Feb 2006	IND	Ravikant Shukla	209/6(47.4)	SL	Angelo Mathews	207(48.3)	R. Premadasa Stadium	IND by eight wickets
Match 24	D	10 Feb 2006	ENG	Moeen Ali	172(49.5)	ZIM	Sean Williams	175/8(47.1)	Colombo Cricket Club Ground	ZIM by two wickets

== Quarter-finals results ==
=== Super League Quarter-finals ===
No.	Date	Team 1	Captain	Score	Team 2	Captain	Score	Venue	Results
QF 1	11 Feb 2006	BAN	Mushfiqur Rahim	155(48.2)	ENG	Moeen Ali	156/5(43.3)	P. Saravanamuttu Stadium	ENG by five wickets
QF 2	11 Feb 2006	IND	Ravikant Shukla	284/9(50)	WI	Leon Johnson	158(38.5)	R. Premadasa Stadium or Sinhalese Sports Club Ground	IND by 126 runs
QF 3	11 Feb 2006	ZIM	Sean Williams	181(49.3)	PAK	Sarfraz Ahmed	185/5(48)	Nondescripts Cricket Club Ground	PAK by five wickets
QF 4	11 Feb 2006	AUS	Moises Henriques	178/1(26.1)	SL	Sameera Zoysa	177(46.3)	R. Premadasa Stadium or Sinhalese Sports Club Ground	AUS by nine wickets

=== Plate Championship Quarter-finals ===
No.	Date	Team 1	Captain	Score	Team 2	Captain	Score	Venue	Results
QF 1	14 Feb 2006	NZ	Marc Ellison	305/7(49.1)	IRL	Eoin Morgan	304/9(50)	R. Premadasa Stadium	NZ by three wickets
QF 2	14 Feb 2006	NAM	Stephanus Ackermann	219/8(50)	USA	Hemant Punoo	220/8(49)	Sinhalese Sports Club Ground	USA by two wickets
QF 3	14 Feb 2006	NEP	Kanishka Chaugai	192/9(50)	UGA	Hamza Almuzahim	132(44.3)	P. Saravanamuttu Stadium	NEP by 60 runs
QF 4	14 Feb 2006	SA	Dean Elgar	337/8(50)	SCO	Kasiam Farid	152(40.4)	Nondescripts Cricket Club Ground	SA by 185 runs

== Semi-finals results ==
=== Plate Championship Semi-finals ===
No.	Date	Team 1	Captain	Score	Team 2	Captain	Score	Venue	Results
SF 1	15 Feb 2006	NZ	Marc Ellison	275/8(50)	USA	Hemant Punoo	125(29.3)	P. Saravanamuttu Stadium	NZ by 170 runs
SF 2	16 Feb 2006	NEP	Kanishka Chaugai	214/8(50)	SA	Dean Elgar	212/5(50)	Nondescripts Cricket Club Ground	NEP by two runs

=== Super League Play-off Semi-finals ===
No.	Date	Team 1	Captain	Score	Team 2	Captain	Score	Venue	Results
PSF 1	15 Feb 2006	BAN	Mushfiqur Rahim	162/6(33.1)	WI	Leon Johnson	161(37.2)	Sinhalese Sports Club Ground	BAN by four wickets
PSF 2	16 Feb 2006	ZIM	Sean Williams	256/8(50)	SL	Sameera Zoysa	259/2(47.2)	R. Premadasa Stadium	SL by eight wickets

=== Plate Championship Play-off Semi-finals ===
No.	Date	Team 1	Captain	Score	Team 2	Captain	Score	Venue	Results
PSF 1	15 Feb 2006	IRL	Eoin Morgan	116/4(29.2)	NAM	Stephanus Ackermann	115(36.3)	Nondescripts Cricket Club Ground	IRL by six wickets
PSF 2	17 Feb 2006	UGA	Hamza Almuzahim	214/9(50)	SCO	Kasiam Farid	145(40)	P. Saravanamuttu Stadium	UGA by 69 runs

=== Super League Semi-finals ===
No.	Date	Team 1	Captain	Score	Team 2	Captain	Score	Venue	Results
SF 1	15 Feb 2006	ENG	Moeen Ali	58(20.1)	IND	Ravikant Shukla	292/4(50)	R. Premadasa Stadium	IND by 234 runs
SF 2	17 Feb 2006	PAK	Sarfraz Ahmed	287/9(50)	AUS	Moises Henriques	124(32.3)	R. Premadasa Stadium	PAK by 163 runs

== Final results ==
=== Plate Championship Play-off final ===
No.	Date	Team 1	Captain	Score	Team 2	Captain	Score	Venue	Results
Play-off	18 Feb 2006	IRE	Eoin Morgan	166/4(35.5)	UGA	Hamza Almuzahim	165/8(50)	Nondescripts Cricket Club Ground	IRE by six wickets

=== Super League Play-off final ===
No.	Date	Team 1	Captain	Score	Team 2	Captain	Score	Venue	Results
Play-off	18 Feb 2006	BAN	Mushfiqur Rahim	278/8(50)	SL	Sameera Zoysa	180(44.5)	Sinhalese Sports Club Ground	BAN by 98 runs

=== Plate Championship final ===
No.	Date	Team 1	Captain	Score	Team 2	Captain	Score	Venue	Results
Final	18 Feb 2006	NZ	Marc Ellison	204(49.2)	NEP	Kanishka Chaugai	205/9(49.4)	P. Saravanamuttu Stadium	NEP by one wicket

== Final ==
A dramatic final was played between Pakistan and India in Colombo. After Pakistan set a very low target of 110 runs to win for India, a stunning Pakistani bowling performance devastated India's top-order batsmen, taking the first six wickets for nine runs. India was eventually dismissed for 71 within 19 overs, enabling Pakistan to become the first country ever to defend the title successfully and become back-to-back champions of the tournament.

19 February 2006

Pakistan; 109 (41.1 overs)	v	India; 71 (18.5 overs)
Rameez Raja Jr. 25 (67); Piyush Chawla 4/8 (8.1 overs)		Piyush Chawla 25 (37); Anwar Ali 5/35 (9 overs)

Pakistan won by 38 runs
R. Premadasa Stadium, Colombo
Umpires: Billy Doctrove (WI) and Steve Davis (Aus)
Player of the match: Anwar Ali (Pak)

- Pakistan won the toss and elected to bat.

== Final standings ==
Position	Team
1	Pakistan
2	India
3	Australia
4	England
5	Bangladesh
6	Sri Lanka
7	Zimbabwe
8	West Indies
9	Nepal
10	New Zealand
11	South Africa
12	United States
13	Ireland
14	Uganda
15	Namibia
16	Scotland

== Future senior players ==
Future players that featured for their national team in the tournament were:

Team	Future senior cricketers
Australia†	Moises Henriques; Jon Holland; Jackson Bird; Aaron Finch; Usman Khawaja; Matthew Wade; Ben Cutting; David Warner; Tom Cooper
Bangladesh†	Mushfiqur Rahim; Shakib Al Hasan; Raqibul Hasan; Tamim Iqbal; Dolar Mahmud; Suhrawadi Shuvo; Kamrul Islam; Shamsur Rahman; Mehrab Hossain, Jr.; Sirajullah Khadim
England	Moeen Ali; Mark Stoneman
India	Piyush Chawla; Cheteshwar Pujara; Rohit Sharma; Ravindra Jadeja; Ishant Sharma; Shahbaz Nadeem
Ireland†	Gary Wilson; Andrew Poynter; Gary Kidd; Greg Thompson; James Hall; Eoin Morgan
Nepal	Amrit Bhattarai; Basant Regmi; Gyanendra Malla; Kanishka Chaugai; Mahesh Chhetri; Paras Khadka; Sharad Vesawkar
New Zealand	Martin Guptill; Roneel Hira; Tim Southee; Todd Astle; Colin Munro; Hamish Bennett
Pakistan	Sarfraz Ahmed; Imad Wasim; Anwar Ali; Nasir Jamshed; Rameez Raja
Scotland	Richie Berrington; Moneeb Iqbal; Gordon Goudie; Calum MacLeod
South Africa†	Dean Elgar; Mthokozisi Shezi; Richard Levi; Wayne Parnell; Craig Kieswetter
Sri Lanka	Angelo Mathews; Dimuth Karunaratne; Ashan Priyanjan; Isuru Udana; Sachith Pathirana; Thisara Perera
United States	Abhimanyu Rajp; Akeem Dodson; Mrunal Patel; Nisarg Patel; Ravi Timbawala; Mohammad Usman Rehman
West Indies	Andre Fletcher; Sunil Narine; Kieron Pollard; Nelon Pascal; Jason Mohammed; Leon Johnson; William Perkins; Kemar Roach
Zimbabwe†	Sean Williams; Prince Masvaure; Taurai Muzarabani; Chamu Chibhabha; Graeme Cremer; Friday Kasteni; Taurai Muzarabani; Keegan Meth; Gary Ballance
† Tom Cooper represented Australia but also went on to play international cricket for Netherlands.
Sirajullah Khadim who played for Bangladesh U-19 later represented Portugal
Eoin Morgan also represented Ireland but went on to play international cricket for England
Craig Kieswetter also represented South Africa but went on to play international cricket for England
Gary Ballance who played for Zimbabwe U-19 later represented England

== See also ==
- 2004 ICC Under-19 Cricket World Cup
