= Derbyshire County Cricket Club in 1997 =

1997 season of an English cricket team

Derbyshire County Cricket Club seasons
1997 season
- Captain: Dean Jones
- County Championship: 16
- AXA Life League: 14
- National Westminster Bank Trophy: Quarter-final
- Benson & Hedges Cup.: Group
- Most runs: Kim Barnett
- Most wickets: Devon Malcolm
- Most catches: Karl Krikken

Derbyshire County Cricket Club in 1997 was the cricket season when the English club Derbyshire had been playing for one hundred and twenty-six years. In the County Championship, they won two matches to finish sixteenth in their ninety fourth season in the Championship. They came fourteenth in the AXA Life League and did not progress from the group in the National Westminster Bank Trophy. They reached the semi-final of the Benson & Hedges Cup.

== 1997 season ==
Derbyshire played seventeen matches in the County Championship, one against Cambridge University, one against the touring Australians and one against the Pakistan A team. They won five first class matches overall but three wins were in the non-championship games leaving only two wins in the championship. They won four and lost nine matches in the Sunday league.

Dean Jones was in his second season as captain. Kim Barnett was top scorer although Chris Adams scored most runs in the one-day game including five centuries. Devon Malcolm took most wickets.

The team set two partnership records during the season - the second wicket partnership of 417 by Kim Barnett and Tim Tweats against Yorkshire and the third wicket partnership of 316* by Adrian Rollins and Kim Barnett against Leicestershire.

== Matches ==
=== First Class ===
List of matches
No.	Date	V	Result	Margin	Notes
1	15 Apr 1997	Cambridge University; FP Fenner's Ground, Cambridge	Won	Innings and 12 runs	
2	23 Apr 1997	Kent; St Lawrence Ground, Canterbury	Drawn		CJ Adams 108; DE Malcolm 6-74; McCague 5-75; PAJ DeFreitas 7-64
3	7 May 1997	Surrey; County Ground, Derby	Drawn		
4	14 May 1997	Middlesex; Lord's Cricket Ground, St John's Wood	Lost	131 runs	DE Malcolm 5-50 and 6-75; PAJ DeFreitas 5-46
5	21 May 1997	Nottinghamshire; Trent Bridge, Nottingham	Lost	2 wickets	Bowen 7-75
6	31 May 1997	Australians; County Ground, Derby	Won	1 wicket	Blewit 121; Bevan 104; Warne 7-103
7	04 Jun 1997	Hampshire; Queen's Park, Chesterfield	Lost	7 wickets	AS Rollins 210; R Smith 154; KJ Barnett 101; Hayden 136; Renshaw 5-110
8	12 Jun 1997	Warwickshire; Edgbaston, Birmingham	Drawn		VP Clarke 99; DE Malcolm 5-85
9	18 Jun 1997	Sussex; County Ground, Derby	Drawn		Prichard 106; Law 157; Ilott 7-59; Such 5-27
10	26 Jun 1997	Essex; Southchurch Park, Southend-on-Sea	Lost	Innings and 145 runs	
11	05 Jul 1997	Pakistan A team in England in 1997; County Ground, Derby	Won	7 wickets	MR May 107
12	16 Jul 1997	Gloucestershire; College Ground, Cheltenham	Lost	Innings and 35 runs	Young 237; A Smith 6-47
13	23 Jul 1997	Glamorgan; Queen's Park, Chesterfield	Drawn		AS Rollins 148; MR May 116; Dale 142
14	31 Jul 1997	Durham; Riverside Ground, Chester-le-Street	Lost	6 wickets	CJ Adams 107; Lewis 160; PAJ DeFreitas 5-37; Brown 5-58
15	15 Aug 1997	Lancashire; County Ground, Derby	Won	Innings and 37 runs	Crawley 133; DE Malcolm 6-23
16	20 Aug 1997	Leicestershire; Grace Road, Leicester	Lost	163 runs	Wells 190; AS Rollins 171; KJ Barnett 147; PAJ DeFreitas 5-120; Pierson 6-56
17	27 Aug 1997	Somerset; County Ground, Derby	Drawn		
18	02 Sep 1997	Northamptonshire; County Ground, Derby	Lost	9 wickets	Davies 5-46
19	10 Sep 1997	Worcestershire; County Ground, New Road, Worcester	Lost	10 wickets	Weston 188; Moody 101
20	18 Sep 1997	Yorkshire; County Ground, Derby	Won	9 wickets	KJ Barnett 210; TA Tweats 189; PAJ DeFreitas 6-98

=== AXA Life League ===
List of matches
No.	Date	V	Result	Margin	Notes
1	27 Apr 1997	Kent; St Lawrence Ground, Canterbury	Lost	6 wickets	
2	4 May 1997	Lancashire; County Ground, Derby	Lost	35 runs	
3	11 May 1997	Surrey; County Ground, Derby	Abandoned		
4	18 May 1997	Middlesex; Lord's Cricket Ground, St John's Wood	Lost	4 wickets	
5	25 May 1997	Nottinghamshire; Trent Bridge, Nottingham	Lost	32 runs	Johnson 117; Archer 104; CJ Adams 121
6	08 Jun 1997	Hampshire; Queen's Park, Chesterfield	Won	4 wickets	
7	15 Jun 1997	Warwickshire; Edgbaston, Birmingham	Lost	108 runs	
8	22 Jun 1997	Sussex; County Ground, Derby	Abandoned		
9	29 Jun 1997	Essex; Southchurch Park, Southend-on-Sea	Lost	1 run	
10	13 Jul 1997	Yorkshire; County Ground, Derby	Won	114 runs	CJ Adams 109
11	20 Jul 1997	Gloucestershire; College Ground, Cheltenham	Lost	7 wickets	KJ Barnett 99
12	27 Jul 1997	Glamorgan; Queen's Park, Chesterfield	Won	8 wickets	DG Cork 6-21
13	03 Aug 1997	Durham; Riverside Ground, Chester-le-Street	Lost	5 wickets	
14	24 Aug 1997	Leicestershire; Grace Road, Leicester	Abandoned		
15	31 Aug 1997	Somerset; County Ground, Derby	Abandoned		
16	07 Sep 1997	Northamptonshire; County Ground, Derby	Lost	7 wickets	
17	14 Sep 1997	Worcestershire; County Ground, New Road, Worcester	Won	5 wickets	Moody 112

=== National Westminster Bank Trophy ===
List of matches
No.	Date	V	Result	Margin	Notes
1st Round	24 Jun 1997	Lincolnshire; Lindum Sports Club Ground, Lincoln	Won	8 wickets	
2nd Round	09 Jul 1997	Northamptonshire; County Ground, Derby	Won	144 runs	CJ Adams101; KJ Barnett 111; DE Malcolm 7-35
Quarter Final	29 Jul 1997	Sussex; County Ground, Derby	Lost	5 wickets	CJ Adams 129; Rao 158

=== Benson and Hedges Cup ===
List of matches
No.	Date	V	Result	Margin	Notes
Group A 1	28 Apr 1997	Minor Counties cricket team County Ground, Lakenham	Won	6 wickets	CJ Adams 138
Group A 2	30 Apr 1997	Lancashire; Old Trafford, Manchester	Won	6 wickets	KJ Barnett 112
Group A 3	2 May 1997	Yorkshire; County Ground, Derby	Lost	Faster rate	
Group A 4	5 May 1997	Worcestershire; County Ground, Derby	Won	20 runs	
Group A 5	12 May 1997	Warwickshire; County Ground, Derby	Lost	1 wicket	

== Statistics ==
=== Competition batting averages ===
Name	County Championship						AXA Life League						NWB Trophy						B & H Cup					
Name	M	I	Runs	HS	Ave	100	M	I	Runs	HS	Ave	100	M	I	Runs	HS	Ave	100	M	I	Runs	HS	Ave	100
CJ Adams	12	21	611	108	30.55	2	11	11	427	121	42.70	2	3	3	301	129*	301.00	2	5	5	260	138	52.00	1
P Aldred	6	5	111	83	27.75	0	10	6	53	17	10.60	0	3	2	4	4	4.00	0						
KJ Barnett	15	24	1055	210*	50.23	3	8	7	297	99	42.42	0	3	2	129	111	64.50	1	5	5	325	112*	81.25	1
ID Blackwell	3	3	46	42	15.33	0	4	4	54	29	13.50	0							1	0				
ME Cassar	7	8	227	78	32.42	0	4	3	36	33	12.00	0												
VP Clarke	16	25	728	99	36.40	0	13	13	244	77*	24.40	0	3	2	35	24*	35.00	0	5	5	81	52	20.25	0
DG Cork	6	9	192	55*	24.00	0	3	3	67	33	22.33	0	1	1	16	16	16.00	0						
KJ Dean	7	9	41	16	6.83	0	10	3	2	1*	2.00	0	1	0					5	1	6	6	6.00	0
PAJ DeFreitas	16	20	417	96	21.94	0	12	10	140	45	15.55	0	3	2	50	26	25.00	0	5	3	44	32*	22.00	0
SP Griffiths							1	0																
AJ Harris	16	22	140	36	7.36	0	13	7	27	10*	9.00	0	2	1	5	5*	0	0	5	2	6	4*	6.00	0
AN Hayhurst	1	1	6	6	6.00	0	2	2	20	12	10.00	0												
DM Jones	5	9	312	99*	39.00	0	5	5	189	58	37.80	0							5	5	105	35	21.00	0
GA Khan	2	3	77	62*	38.50	0	7	6	124	71*	24.80	0	2	2	19	19	9.50	0	5	5	88	33	22.00	0
KM Krikken	17	24	492	72	23.42	0	12	11	153	39	19.12	0	3	2	39	38	19.50	0	5	4	123	42*	123.00	0
SJ Lacey	5	7	126	50	31.50	0	3	1	9	9	9.00	0												
DE Malcolm	13	18	61	21*	6.10	0	1	1	3	3	3.00	0	3	0					3	3	16	13	5.33	0
MR May	7	13	383	116	31.91	1							1	1	5	5	5.00	0						
JEH Owen	4	6	83	22	13.83	0	2	1	5	5	5.00	0	1	1	10	10	10.00	0						
GM Roberts	1	2	15	13	7.50	0	6	5	19	9	6.33	0							5	3	15	12	7.50	0
AS Rollins	14	24	854	210	40.66	3	8	8	212	36	35.33	0	3	3	67	40	22.33	0	1	1	0	0	0.00	0
TM Smith	1	0																						
BL Spendlove	1	1	15	15*	0	0	1	1	4	4	4.00	0												
SD Stubbings	1	2	27	22	13.50	0																		
TA Tweats	7	13	590	189	53.63	1	4	4	40	19	13.33	0	1	1	5	5*	0							
MJ Vandrau	4	7	168	54	28.00	0	3	2	16	10	8.00	0												

=== Competition bowling averages ===
Name	County Championship					AXA Life League					NWB Trophy					B & H Cup				
Name	Balls	Runs	Wkts	Best	Ave	Balls	Runs	Wkts	Best	Ave	Balls	Runs	Wkts	Best	Ave	Balls	Runs	Wkts	Best	Ave
CJ Adams	17	16	0			60	85	1	1-49	85.00										
P Aldred	738	291	10	3-28	29.10	330	290	7	3-40	41.42	140	99	4	4-30	24.75					
KJ Barnett						12	20	2	2-20	10.00	60	48	0			60	52	3	3-52	17.33
ID Blackwell	168	121	1	1-27	121.00											30	38	0		
ME Cassar	313	224	8	3-31	28.00	66	85	2	1-15	42.50										
VP Clarke	1029	668	7	1-10	95.42	312	292	9	2-28	32.44	162	92	2	1-38	46.00	168	142	7	4-49	20.28
DG Cork	792	457	11	4-48	41.54	102	80	6	6-21	13.33	68	67	1	1-67	67.00					
KJ Dean	952	541	14	3-21	38.64	417	329	10	3-24	32.90	54	24	1	1-24	24.00	180	149	3	1-16	49.66
PAJ DeFreitas	2917	1574	54	7-64	29.14	383	309	10	3-19	30.90	186	102	2	1-20	51.00	294	171	5	2-43	34.20
AJ Harris	2607	1531	33	3-66	46.39	530	479	21	4-22	22.80	108	79	3	2-12	26.33	287	234	8	3-41	29.25
AN Hayhurst						42	37	2	2-37	18.50										
DM Jones	12	0	0			24	45	0												
SJ Lacey	564	291	7	3-97	41.57	66	62	1	1-38	62.00										
DE Malcolm	2241	1262	60	6-23	21.03	48	51	1	1-51	51.00	169	95	10	7-35	9.50	161	116	5	2-38	23.20
MR May	25	50	0																	
GM Roberts	36	8	0			195	195	0								276	228	9	3-45	25.33
AS Rollins	6	9	0			12	15	0												
TM Smith	108	51	1	1-27	51.00															
MJ Vandrau	264	182	4	3-78	45.50	60	63	2	2-32	31.50										

=== Wicket Keeping ===
KM Krikken

County Championship Catches 51, Stumping 2
AXA League Catches 11, Stumping 3
National Westminster Trophy Catches 1, Stumping 0
Benson and Hedges Cup Catches 3, Stumping 0

== See also ==
- Derbyshire County Cricket Club seasons
- 1997 English cricket season
