= Derbyshire County Cricket Club in 1993 =

1993 season of an English cricket team

Derbyshire County Cricket Club seasons
1993 season
- Captain: Kim Barnett
- County Championship: 15
- AXA Equity and Law League: 11
- National Westminster Bank Trophy: Round 2
- Benson & Hedges Cup.: Winners
- Most runs: John Morris
- Most wickets: Devon Malcolm
- Most catches: Karl Krikken

Derbyshire County Cricket Club in 1993 was the cricket season when the English club Derbyshire won the Benson & Hedges Cup. The club had been playing for one hundred and twenty-two years. In the County Championship, they won four matches to finish fifteenth in their ninetieth season in the Championship. They were eliminated in round two of the National Westminster Bank Trophy and came eleventh in the AXA Equity and Law League.

== 1993 season ==
Derbyshire played seventeen matches in the County Championship, one against Cambridge University, and one against the touring Australians. They won four first class matches overall, drawing in the non-championship games. They won seven matches in the Sunday league.

Kim Barnett was in his tenth season as captain. John Morris was top scorer although Chris Adams scored most runs in the one-day game. Devon Malcolm took most wickets, although Simon Base was most successful in the one-day league. The 5th wicket stand of 302 by John Morris and Dominic Cork against Gloucestershire became a Derbyshire record.

The season saw the debuts of Adrian Rollins, Gary Steer and Matthew Vandrau who all played in the following season. Rollins was brought in as an additional wicket-keeper.

== Matches ==
=== First Class ===
List of matches
No.	Date	V	Result	Margin	Notes
1	14 Apr 1993	Cambridge University; FP Fenner's Ground, Cambridge	Drawn		JE Morris 136; TJG O'Gorman 130
2	6 May 1993	Warwickshire; Edgbaston, Birmingham	Won	Innings and 72 runs	JE Morris 95
3	13 May 1993	Glamorgan; County Ground, Derby	Lost	191 runs	H Morris 100; Maynard 145; Watkin 5-71
4	20 May 1993	Essex; County Ground, Chelmsford	Drawn		Malik 132; Hussain 152; KJ Barnett 130
5	27 May 1993	Hampshire; County Ground, Derby	Drawn		R Smith 101
6	3 Jun 1993	Middlesex; Lord's Cricket Ground, St John's Wood	Lost	10 wickets	
7	10 Jun 1993	Yorkshire; Queen's Park, Chesterfield	Drawn		No play on two days
8	17 Jun 1993	Kent; St Lawrence Ground, Canterbury	Lost	9 wickets	McCague 5-34; SJ Base 5-93
9	24 Jun 1993	Lancashire; County Ground, Derby	Lost	111 runs	Atherton 137; Akram 117 and 6-45; KJ Barnett 161; JE Morris 151; DE Malcolm 5-98; DeFreitas 5-109
10	1 Jul 1993	Worcestershire; Chester Road North Ground, Kidderminster	Lost	9 wickets	Weston 109; Hick 173; KJ Barnett 168; SJ Base 5-82
11	13 Jul 1993	Australians; County Ground, Derby	Drawn		KJ Barnett 114; Slater 133; Holdsworth 5-117
12	22 Jul 1993	Sussex; County Ground, Derby	Won	195 runs	JE Morris 104; SJ Base 5-59; DE Malcolm 6-57
13	29 Jul 1993	Gloucestershire; College Ground, Cheltenham	Won	7 wickets	JE Morris 229; DG Cork 104; Broad 120; AE Warner 5-27 and 5-93
14	5 Aug 1993	Durham; The Racecourse, Durham University Grounds, Durham	Drawn		OH Mortensen 5-55
15	12 Aug 1993	Somerset; County Ground, Derby	Lost	Innings and 97 runs	Hayhurst 169; Lathwell 109; Caddick 5-49; Mallender 5-49
16	19 Aug 1993	Surrey; Rutland Recreation Ground, Ilkeston	Won	6 wickets	PD Bowler 143; JE Morris 127; Hollioake 123; AE Warner 5-57
17	26 Aug 1993	Nottinghamshire; Trent Bridge, Nottingham	Drawn		Pollard 180; Dessaur 104; PD Bowler 153; CJ Adams 175
18	9 Sep 1993	Northamptonshire; County Ground, Derby	Lost	Innings and 46 runs	Bailey 103; Ambrose 6-49
19	16 Sep 1993	Leicestershire; Grace Road, Leicester	Drawn		

=== AXA Equity and Law League ===
List of matches
No.	Date	V	Result	Margin	Notes
1	9 May 1993	Warwickshire; Edgbaston, Birmingham	Lost	3 wickets	
2	16 May 1993	Glamorgan; County Ground, Derby	Won	3 runs	PD Bowler 96; SR Barwick 6-28
3	23 May 1993	Essex; County Ground, Chelmsford	Won	2 wickets	
4	30 May 1993	Hampshire; Uttoxeter Road, Checkley	Abandoned		
5	6 Jun 1993	Middlesex; Lord's Cricket Ground, St John's Wood	Lost	2 wickets	PD Bowler 104
6	13 Jun 1993	Yorkshire; Queen's Park, Chesterfield	Lost	9 wickets	Byas 106
7	20 Jun 1993	Kent; St Lawrence Ground, Canterbury	Won	3 runs	
8	27 Jun 1993	Lancashire; County Ground, Derby	Lost	161 runs	Atherton 105
9	4 Jul 1993	Worcestershire; County Ground, New Road, Worcester	Won	5 wickets	
10	25 Jul 1993	Sussex; County Ground, Derby	Won	81 runs	
11	1 Aug 1993	Gloucestershire; College Ground, Cheltenham	Won	8 wickets	
12	8 Aug 1993	Durham; The Racecourse, Durham University Grounds, Durham	Lost	112 runs	Fowler 124
13	15 Aug 1993	Somerset; County Ground, Derby	Won	113 runs	PD Bowler 138
14	22 Aug 1993	Surrey; Rutland Recreation Ground, Ilkeston	Lost	5 wickets	
15	29 Aug 1993	Nottinghamshire; Trent Bridge, Nottingham	Lost	142 runs	
16	12 Sep 1993	Northamptonshire; County Ground, Derby	No Result		
17	19 Sep 1993	Leicestershire; Grace Road, Leicester	Lost	14 runs	

=== National Westminster Bank Trophy ===
List of matches
No.	Date	V	Result	Margin	Notes
1st Round	22 Jun 1993	Devon; The Maer Ground, Exmouth	Won	133 runs	
2nd Round	7 Jul 1993	Worcestershire; County Ground, New Road, Worcester	Lost	4 wickets	

=== Benson and Hedges Cup ===
List of matches
No.	Date	V	Result	Margin	Notes
Prelim round	27 Apr 1993	Gloucestershire; The Royal & Sun Alliance County Ground, Bristol	Won	Lost fewer wickets	
1st Round	11 May 1993	Middlesex; County Ground, Derby	Won	14 runs	
Quarter Final	25 May 1993	Somerset; County Ground, Taunton	No Result	Decided on a bowl-out 6-3	
Semi-final	8 Jun 1993	Northamptonshire; County Ground, Derby	Won	8 wickets	
Final	10 Jul 1993	Lancashire; Lord's Cricket Ground, St John's Wood	Won	6 runs	

== Statistics ==
=== Competition batting averages ===
Name	County Championship						AXA Equity and Law League						NWB Trophy						B & H Cup					
Name	M	I	Runs	HS	Ave	100	M	I	Runs	HS	Ave	100	M	I	Runs	HS	Ave	100	M	I	Runs	HS	Ave	100
CJ Adams	16	27	818	175	30.29	1	15	15	652	93	43.46	0	2	2	106	93	53.00	0	5	4	123	58	41.00	0
KJ Barnett	14	22	1067	168	62.76	4	12	11	270	79	30.00	0	2	2	61	60	30.50	0	5	5	184	61	46.00	0
SJ Base	12	18	132	27	7.33	0	15	9	83	31	16.60	0												
IR Bishop																			1	1	12	12*	0	0
PD Bowler	15	26	1005	153*	41.87	2	16	16	768	138*	59.07	2	2	2	64	58	32.00	0	5	5	196	92	49.00	0
DG Cork	13	20	427	104	23.72	1	10	8	80	26	10.00	0	2	2	37	23	18.50	0	5	2	115	92*	115.00	0
FA Griffith	9	12	191	56	15.91	0	9	8	82	20	11.71	0	2	2	8	8	4.00	0	5	3	21	13*	10.50	0
KM Krikken	11	17	226	40	17.38	0	11	8	64	20*	12.80	0	1	1	9	9*	0	0	5	3	42	37*	42.00	0
BJM Maher	5	5	22	17	5.50	0	5	5	23	14*	5.75	0	1	1	0	0*	0	0						
DE Malcolm	9	11	69	19	9.85	0	8	4	12	7*	6.00	0	2	1	0	0	0.00	0	5	0				0
JE Morris	16	27	1323	229	50.88	4	12	12	158	35*	14.36	0	2	2	92	71	46.00	0	5	4	128	57	42.66	0
OH Mortensen	10	14	70	29	7.77	0	11	5	8	3	2.00	0	2	1	4	4*	0	0	2	0				
TJG O'Gorman	12	19	375	86	22.05	0	16	16	338	60	26.00	0	2	2	69	68*	69.00	0	5	3	91	49	30.33	0
AW Richardson	1	2	9	9	4.50	0																		
AS Rollins	7	13	392	85	43.55	0	8	7	128	57	21.33	0												
RW Sladdin	8	11	131	51*	16.37	0	5	2	21	16	21.00	0												
IGS Steer	4	7	157	67	31.40	0	4	3	26	19	8.66	0												
MJ Vandrau	14	22	404	58	20.20	0	8	6	119	32*	39.66	0	1	1	21	21	21.00	0	2	0				0
AE Warner	11	14	238	95*	18.30	0	11	9	43	15	4.77	0	1	1	2	2	2.00	0	5	1	2	2*	0	0 1

=== Competition bowling averages ===
Name	County Championship					AXA Equity and Law League					NWB Trophy					B & H Cup				
Name	Balls	Runs	Wkts	Best	Ave	Balls	Runs	Wkts	Best	Ave	Balls	Runs	Wkts	Best	Ave	Balls	Runs	Wkts	Best	Ave
CJ Adams	602	469	5	2-88	93.80	124	94	2	2-15	47.00					X	18	18	0		
KJ Barnett	198	78	2	2-40	39.00	42	29	2	1-2	14.50	48	30	0							
SJ Base	1717	972	34	5-59	28.58	750	509	20	4-14	25.45										
IR Bishop																66	37	2	2-37	18.50
PD Bowler	108	37	0																	
DG Cork	1959	931	30	4-90	31.03	431	343	12	2-20	28.58	120	73	5	4-18	14.60	264	191	6	3-46	31.83
FA Griffith	883	546	12	3-32	45.50	505	428	12	4-48	35.66	98	59	2	1-13	29.50	252	206	7	2-48	29.42
DE Malcolm	1673	1007	35	6-57	28.77	451	296	13	4-36	22.76	112	106	4	3-29	26.50	258	180	7	3-23	25.71
OH Mortensen	1530	643	21	5-55	30.61	626	343	14	3-39	24.50	114	61	2	1-30	30.50	132	71	2	1-30	35.50
AW Richardson	132	74	0																	
RW Sladdin	1637	941	18	3-30	52.27	264	217	4	2-26	54.25										
IGS Steer	54	34	3	3-23	11.33	66	54	1	1-33	54.00										
MJ Vandrau	1690	910	16	2-8	56.87	327	286	6	2-39	47.66	42	9	1	1-9	9.00	66	46	1	1-46	46.00
AE Warner	1793	875	41	5-27	21.34	551	386	13	3-11	29.69	72	33	1	1-33	33.00	254	112	4	3-31	28.00

=== Wicket Keeping ===
KM Krikken

County Championship Catches 20, Stumping 4
AXA League Catches 16, Stumping 1

Rollins

County Championship Catches 5, Stumping 1

== See also ==
- Derbyshire County Cricket Club seasons
- 1993 English cricket season
