= Gordon Wilcock =

English cricketer

Personal information
- Full name: Howard Gordon Wilcock
- Born: 26 February 1950 (age 76); New Malden, Surrey, England
- Batting: Right-handed
- Bowling: Right-arm fast-medium
- Role: Wicket-keeper

Domestic team information
- Years: Team
- 1971–1978: Worcestershire

Career statistics
Competition	FC	LA
Matches	99	84
Runs scored	1,697	462
Batting average	16.00	12.83
100s/50s	0/1	0/0
Top score	74	49*
Balls bowled	12	0
Wickets	0	0
Bowling average	–	–
5 wickets in innings	0	0
10 wickets in match	0	N/A
Best bowling	–	–
Catches/stumpings	177/17	54/9
- Source: CricketArchive, 25 November 2008

Howard Gordon Wilcock (born 26 February 1950) is a former English cricketer who played first-class and List A cricket for Worcestershire during the 1970s.

Wilcock was educated at Giggleswick School. He signed by Worcestershire in 1968, having been spotted playing club cricket for Ilkley Cricket Club. He made one Second XI appearance for the county that season, and many more in 1969, but Brian Krikken prevented his standing as keeper until the end of the year. Wilcock also played for Dudley Cricket Club during this period, and continued in the seconds in 1970.

He made his first-class debut against Oxford University at The University Parks in May 1971, though in a game affected by the weather he did not get to bat, and effected only one dismissal, taking the catch to remove John Ward. He retained his place for the County Championship game against Lancashire that followed, in which he achieved his first stumping, accounting for Farokh Engineer off the bowling of Norman Gifford. He was then first-choice keeper for the rest of the season, replacing Rodney Cass.

A final return of 40 first-class dismissals in 1971 was made up of 36 catches and four stumpings. In one-day cricket he managed 12 (including one stumping), and was also occasionally useful with the bat in the shorter form, winning a match against Hampshire with a four off the penultimate ball. Wilcock also did fairly well in 1972, with 42 first-class and 11 List A dismissals, although Cass displaced him at the end of the summer, and in 1973 Wilcock did not get a single first-team game in either first-class or List A cricket.

Wilcock returned for 1974, he and Cass both making a number of appearances as wicket-keeper as Worcestershire won the County Championship. In August 1974 he took six catches in the second innings against Hampshire at Portsmouth, which matched the county record in a Championship match. Sadly for him, his efforts were in vain as Worcestershire were crushed by an innings inside two days.

He played the first half of the 1975 season, but was then relegated to the Second XI for the rest of the summer. However, with Cass having been released by the county, Wilcock was a regular throughout the record-breaking hot summer of 1976. In 1977, he took until mid-season to establish himself in the team, and he managed very few dismissals, though he did score his only first-class half-century when he made 74 in Worcestershire's two-day innings victory over Yorkshire in August.

1978 saw the arrival of David Humphries, who quickly became Worcestershire's number one keeper, and Wilcock played only one first-team game – his last – that year, a first-class match against Oxford University at Worcester. He held four catches, but made a duck in his only innings.
