= Krikken =

Krikken is a surname. Notable people with the surname include:

- Brian Krikken (born 1946), English cricketer
- Karl Krikken (born 1969), English cricketer
