= 2010 Men's Hockey World Cup =

2010 edition of the Men's Hockey World Cup

2010 Hockey World Cup
- Official logo

Tournament details
- Host country: India
- City: New Delhi
- Dates: 28 February – 13 March
- Teams: 12 (from 5 confederations)
- Venue: Dhyan Chand National Stadium

Final positions
- Champions: Australia (2nd title)
- Runner-up: Germany
- Third place: Netherlands

Tournament statistics
- Matches played: 38
- Goals scored: 199 (5.24 per match)
- Top scorer: (Australia) Luke Doerner (9 goals)
- Best player: (Netherlands) Guus Vogels

The 2010 Men's Hockey World Cup was the 12th edition of Men's Hockey World Cup, the quadrennial world championship for men's national field hockey teams organized by the International Hockey Federation. It was held from 28 February to 13 March 2010 in New Delhi, India.

Australia won the tournament after defeating Germany 2–1 in the final, collecting their second World Cup, after the title obtained in 1986. The Netherlands won the third-place match by defeating England 4–3.

== Background ==
India's hosting of the event was put in doubt when the FIH reviewed the progress of the Indian Hockey Federation's "Promoting Indian Hockey" program and India's preparation for the championship, and warned that "satisfactory progress had not been made in either area". India was warned it could lose the right to host the World Cup unless satisfactory progress was made. It was confirmed on 18 July 2008 that the International Hockey Federation formally awarded the hosting rights to India.

== Qualification ==
Each of the continental champions from five confederations and the host nation received an automatic berth. The European confederation received three extra quotas based upon the FIH World Rankings at the completion of the 2008 Summer Olympics. In addition to the three winners of each of the three Qualifiers, the following twelve teams, shown with final pre-tournament rankings, competed in this tournament.

Dates	Event	Location	Quotas	Qualifier(s)
Host nation			1	India (12)
7–15 March 2009	2009 Pan American Cup	Santiago, Chile	1	Canada (11)
9–16 May 2009	2009 Asia Cup	Kuantan, Malaysia	1	South Korea (5)
10–18 July 2009	2009 Africa Cup of Nations	Accra, Ghana	1	South Africa (13)
22–30 August 2009	2009 EuroHockey Championship	Amsterdam, Netherlands	4	England (6); Germany (1); Netherlands (4); Spain (3)
25–29 August 2009	2009 Oceania Cup	Invercargill, New Zealand	1	Australia (2)
31 October – 8 November 2009	Qualifier 1	Lille, France	1	Pakistan (7)
7–15 November 2009	Qualifier 2	Invercargill, New Zealand	1	New Zealand (8)
14–22 November 2009	Qualifier 3	Quilmes, Argentina	1	Argentina (14)
Total			12	

== Competition format ==
Twelve teams competed in the tournament with the competition consisting of two rounds. In the first round, teams were divided into two pools of six teams, and play followed round robin format with each of the teams playing all other teams in the pool once. Teams were awarded three points for a win, one point for a draw and zero points for a loss. At the end of the pool matches, teams were ranked in their pool according to the following criteria in order:

- Total points accumulated
- Number of matches won
- Goal difference
- Goals for
- The result of the match played between the teams in question

Following the completion of the pool games, teams placing first and second in each pool advanced to a single elimination round consisting of two semifinal games, a third place playoff and a final. Remaining teams competed in classification matches to determine their ranking in the tournament. During these matches, extra time of 7½ minutes per half was to be played if teams were tied at the end of regulation time. During extra time, play followed golden goal rules with the first team to score declared the winner. If no goals were scored during extra time, a penalty stroke competition was to take place.

== Umpires ==
16 umpires were appointed by the FIH for this tournament. During each match, a video umpire was used to assist the on-field umpires in determining if a goal had been legally scored. The FIH also mandated that on a trial basis during the tournament, each team received the right to refer one decision made by an on-field umpire to the video umpire for assessment. Referrals were only permitted for decisions made within the 23 meter area relating to the award (or non-award) of goals, penalty strokes, and penalty corners. In the event that the referral was upheld, the referring team retained a right of further referral.

- Christian Blasch (GER)
- Ged Curran (SCO)
- David Gentles (AUS)
- Colin Hutchinson (IRL)
- Hamish Jamson (ENG)
- Kim Hong-lae (KOR)
- Satinder Kumar (IND)
- Andy Mair (SCO)
- Raghu Prasad (IND)
- Tim Pullman (AUS)
- Marcelo Servetto (ESP)
- Gary Simmonds (RSA)
- Amarjit Singh (MAS)
- Simon Taylor (NZL)
- Roel van Eert (NED)
- John Wright (RSA)

== Preliminary round ==
All times are Indian Standard Time (UTC+05:30)

=== Pool A ===
Pos	Team	Pld	W	D	L	GF	GA	GD	Pts	Qualification
1	Germany	5	3	2	0	19	9	+10	11	Semi-finals
2	Netherlands	5	3	1	1	15	5	+10	10	Semi-finals
3	South Korea	5	3	1	1	16	8	+8	10	Fifth place game
4	Argentina	5	2	0	3	9	11	−2	6	Seventh place game
5	New Zealand	5	2	0	3	8	12	−4	6	Ninth place game
6	Canada	5	0	0	5	6	28	−22	0	Eleventh place game

Source: FIH
Rules for classification: 1) Points; 2) Matches won; 3) Goal difference; 4) Goals scored; 5) Head-to-head result.

1 March 2010
16:35

New Zealand	3–2	Canada
Bhana 11'; Haig 47'; Archibald 66'	Report	Pearson 1'; Wright 20'

Umpires:
Satinder Kumar (IND)
Marcelo Servetto (ESP)

1 March 2010
18:35

Germany	2–2	South Korea
Fuchs 50'; Weß 58'	Report	Hyun Hye-sung 4'; Lee Nam-yong 15'

Umpires:
Ged Curran (SCO)
Tim Pullman (AUS)

1 March 2010
20:35

Netherlands	3–0	Argentina
Taekema 13', 35', 61'	Report

Umpires:
Hamish Jamson (ENG)
David Gentles (AUS)

3 March 2010
16:35

Canada	0–6	Germany
	Report	Weß 3'; Montag 21'; Müller 22'; Haener 27'; Fuchs 58', 63'

Umpires:
David Gentles (AUS)
Kim Hong-lae (KOR)

3 March 2010
16:35

Argentina	1–2	South Korea
Callioni 53'	Report	Lee Nam-yong 62'; Nam Hyun-woo 70'

Umpires:
Christian Blasch (GER)
Satinder Kumar (IND)

3 March 2010
20:35

New Zealand	1–3	Netherlands
Burrows 1'	Report	Brouwer 2'; Taekema 7'; Hertzberger 27'

Umpires:
Marcelo Servetto (ESP)
John Wright (RSA)

5 March 2010
16:35

South Korea	1–2	New Zealand
Lee Nam-yong 70'	Report	Hayward 4'; Couzins 22'

Umpires:
Gary Simmonds (RSA)
Satinder Kumar (IND)

5 March 2010
18:35

Netherlands	6–0	Canada
Taekema 41'; Brouwer 43'; Hofman 48', 56'; Reckers 53', 63'	Report

Umpires:
Kim Hong-lae (KOR)
Ged Curran (SCO)

5 March 2010
20:35

Germany	4–3	Argentina
Zwicker 5', 14'; Witthaus 23'; Häner 51'	Report	L. Vila 6'; Paredes 34'; Ibarra 55'

Umpires:
Roel van Eert (NED)
Andy Mair (SCO)

7 March 2010
16:35

South Korea	9–2	Canada
Nam Hyun-woo 23', 67'; Jang Jong-hyun 35+', 42', 61'; Lee Nam-yong 38'; Yoon Sung-hoon 40'; You Hyo-sik 41', 63'	Report	Wright 42', 51'

Umpires:
Colin Hutchinson (SCO)
Simon Taylor (NZL)

7 March 2010
18:35

New Zealand	0–1	Argentina
	Report	Callioni 55'

Umpires:
Christian Blasch (GER)
Gary Simmonds (RSA)

7 March 2010
20:35

Germany	2–2	Netherlands
Korn 44'; Montag 63'	Report	Jolie 23'; De Nooijer 65'

Umpires:
David Gentles (AUS)
Andy Mair (SCO)

9 March 2010
16:35

Germany	5–2	New Zealand
Menke 15'; Fuchs 28'; Witte 47'; Fürste 63'; Witthaus 64'	Report	McAleese 51'; Wilson 54'

Umpires:
Andy Mair (SCO)
John Wright (RSA)

9 March 2010
18:35

Netherlands	1–2	South Korea
Brouwer 1'	Report	Nam Hyun-woo 31'; Seo Jong-ho 45'

Umpires:
David Gentles (AUS)
Ged Curran (SCO)

9 March 2010
20:35

Canada	2–4	Argentina
Tupper 60'; Jameson 65'	Report	L. Vila 29'; Paredes 43'; Almada 56'; Argento 70'

Umpires:
Hamish Jamson (ENG)
Kim Hong-lae (KOR)

=== Pool B ===
Pos	Team	Pld	W	D	L	GF	GA	GD	Pts	Qualification
1	Australia	5	4	0	1	23	6	+17	12	Semi-finals
2	England	5	4	0	1	17	12	+5	12	Semi-finals
3	Spain	5	3	0	2	12	8	+4	9	Fifth place game
4	India (H)	5	1	1	3	13	17	−4	4	Seventh place game
5	South Africa	5	1	1	3	13	28	−15	4	Ninth place game
6	Pakistan	5	1	0	4	9	16	−7	3	Eleventh place game

Source: FIH
Rules for classification: 1) Points; 2) Matches won; 3) Goal difference; 4) Goals scored; 5) Head-to-head result.
(H) Hosts

28 February 2010
16:35

South Africa	2–4	Spain
Hykes 16'; Haley 30'	Report	Oliva 19'; Alegre 20'; Garza 45'; Quemada 61'

Umpires:
Roel van Eert (NED)
Colin Hutchinson (IRL)

28 February 2010
18:35

Australia	2–3	England
Dwyer 23', 64'	Report	Jackson 24'; Tindall 33', 45'

Umpires:
Christian Blasch (GER)
Kim Hong-lae (KOR)

28 February 2010
20:35

India	4–1	Pakistan
Sh. Singh 27'; Sandeep Singh 35+', 56'; P. Singh 37'	Report	Abbas 59'

Umpires:
Andy Mair (SCO)
John Wright (RSA)

2 March 2010
16:35

South Africa	4–6	England
Harper 10', 53'; Norris-Jones 25'; McDade 67'	Report	Mantell 15', 57'; Moore 23'; Jackson 43'; Catlin 50'; Mackay 51'

Umpires:
Tim Pullman (AUS)
Simon Taylor (NZL)

2 March 2010
18:35

Pakistan	2–1	Spain
Khan 29', 67'	Report	Alegre 65'

Umpires:
Gary Simmonds (RSA)
Roel van Eert (NED)

2 March 2010
20:35

India	2–5	Australia
Pillay 35'; R. Singh 53'	Report	De Young 2'; Turner 7', 43'; Abbott 26'; Doerner 42'

Umpires:
Ged Curran (SCO)
Andy Mair (SCO)

4 March 2010
16:35

South Africa	0–12	Australia
	Report	Doerner 16', 34', 49', 66', 68'; Turner 20', 62'; Abbott 26'; Kavanagh 35'; Butturini 44'; Dwyer 52', 54'

Umpires:
Simon Taylor (NZL)
Hamish Jamson (ENG)

4 March 2010
18:35

England	5–2	Pakistan
Clarke 20', 62'; Jackson 32'; Middleton 52', 65'	Report	Abbasi 45'; Butt 49'

Umpires:
Christian Blasch (GER)
Tim Pullman (AUS)

4 March 2010
20:35

India	2–5	Spain
San. Singh 39'; Chandi 43'	Report	Sala 19'; Amat 35'; Quemada 41', 67'; Oliva 42'

Umpires:
John Wright (RSA)
David Gentles (AUS)

6 March 2010
16:35

Australia	2–0	Spain
Doerner 20'; Turner 60'	Report

Umpires:
John Wright (RSA)
Ged Curran (SCO)

6 March 2010
18:35

South Africa	4–3	Pakistan
Carr 38'; Haley 41'; T. Paton 46'; Harper 54'	Report	Butt 6'; Imran 68'; W. Ahmed 70+'

Umpires:
Tim Pullman (AUS)
Hamish Jamson (ENG)

6 March 2010
20:35

India	2–3	England
Chandi 54'; R. Singh 57'	Report	Tindall 16'; Jackson 42', 47'

Umpires:
Christian Blasch (GER)
Marcelo Servetto (ESP)

8 March 2010
16:35

Spain	2–0	England
Quemada 35'; Tubau 64'	Report

Umpires:
Tim Pullman (AUS)
Satinder Kumar (IND)

8 March 2010
18:35

Australia	2–1	Pakistan
Abbott 38', 68'	Report	Abbas 24'

Umpires:
Marcelo Servetto (ESP)
Gary Simmonds (RSA)

8 March 2010
20:35

India	3–3	South Africa
Sar. Singh 17'; Ram 25'; Sh. Singh 66'	Report	Norris-Jones 7'; Reid-Ross 39'; Smith 48'

Umpires:
Ged Curran (SCO)
Roel van Eert (NED)

== Fifth to twelfth place classification ==
=== Eleventh and twelfth place ===
11 March 2010
15:35

Canada	3–2 (a.e.t.)	Pakistan
Grimes 12'; Pearson 58'; Tupper 83'	Report	Butt 4'; Ali 46'

Umpires:
Colin Hutchinson (IRL)
Simon Taylor (NZL)

=== Ninth and tenth place ===
12 March 2010
15:35

New Zealand	4–4 (a.e.t.)	South Africa
Inglis 40'; Hayward 42', 49', 70+'	Report	Reid-Ross 4'; Norris-Jones 45'; T. Paton 50'; Hammond 57'
Penalties
Archibald (penalty shoot-out missed); Couzins (penalty shoot-out scored); Hayward (penalty shoot-out scored); McAleese (penalty shoot-out scored); Wilson (penalty shoot-out scored); Couzins (penalty shoot-out scored)	5–4	(penalty shoot-out scored) Madsen; (penalty shoot-out scored) Reid-Ross; (penalty shoot-out missed) W. Paton; (penalty shoot-out scored) Haley; (penalty shoot-out scored) Carr; (penalty shoot-out missed) Madsen

Umpires:
Hamish Jamson (ENG)
Satinder Kumar (IND)

=== Seventh and eighth place ===
12 March 2010
18:05

Argentina	4–2	India
Argento 28'; L. Vila 43', 45'; Callioni 46'	Report	San. Singh 42'; Sh. Singh 49'

Umpires:
Tim Pullman (AUS)
Kim Hong-lae (KOR)

=== Fifth and sixth place ===
12 March 2010
20:35

South Korea	0–2	Spain
	Report	Amat 1', 32'

Umpires:
Ged Curran (SCO)
Roel van Eert (NED)

== First to fourth place classification ==
=== Bracket ===
Semi-finals
11 March
Germany	4
England	1
11 March
Australia	2
Netherlands	1

Final
13 March
Germany	1
Australia	2
Third place
13 March
England	3
Netherlands	4

=== Semi-finals ===
11 March 2010
18:05

Germany	4–1	England
Montag 6'; Korn 11'; Häner 31'; Butt 60'	Report	Smith 19'

Umpires:
David Gentles (AUS)
John Wright (RSA)

11 March 2010
20:35

Australia	2–1	Netherlands
Doerner 27'; Turner 55'	Report	Taekema 58'

Umpires:
Christian Blasch (GER)
Andy Mair (SCO)

=== Third and fourth place ===
13 March 2010
15:35

England	3–4	Netherlands
Brogdon 23'; Jackson 30', 34'	Report	De Nooijer 22'; Taekema 48'; Vermeulen 55'; Hofman 67'

Umpires:
Marcelo Servetto (ESP)
Gary Simmonds (RSA)

=== Final ===
13 March 2010
18:05

Germany	1–2	Australia
Fürste 48'	Report	Ockenden 6'; Doerner 60'

Umpires:
Andy Mair (SCO)
John Wright (RSA)

== Statistics ==
=== Final standings ===
Pos	Grp	Team	Pld	W	D	L	GF	GA	GD	Pts	Final standing
1st place, gold medalist(s)	B	Australia	7	6	0	1	27	8	+19	18	Gold medal
2nd place, silver medalist(s)	A	Germany	7	4	2	1	24	12	+12	14	Silver medal
3rd place, bronze medalist(s)	A	Netherlands	7	4	1	2	20	10	+10	13	Bronze medal
4	B	England	7	4	0	3	21	20	+1	12	Fourth place
5	B	Spain	6	4	0	2	14	8	+6	12	Eliminated in group stage
6	A	South Korea	6	3	1	2	16	10	+6	10	Eliminated in group stage
7	A	Argentina	6	3	0	3	13	13	0	9	Eliminated in group stage
8	B	India (H)	6	1	1	4	15	21	−6	4	Eliminated in group stage
9	A	New Zealand	6	2	1	3	12	16	−4	7	Eliminated in group stage
10	B	South Africa	6	1	2	3	17	32	−15	5	Eliminated in group stage
11	A	Canada	6	1	0	5	9	30	−21	3	Eliminated in group stage
12	B	Pakistan	6	1	0	5	11	19	−8	3	Eliminated in group stage

Source: FIH
(H) Hosts

=== Awards ===
Player of the Tournament	Top Goalscorer	Goalkeeper of the Tournament	Defender of the Tournament	Fair Play Trophy
(Netherlands) Guus Vogels	(Australia) Luke Doerner	(Netherlands) Guus Vogels	(Germany) Maximilian Müller	New Zealand

=== Goalscorers ===
There were 199 goals scored in 38 matches, for an average of 5.24 goals per match.

9 goals

- (Australia) Luke Doerner

7 goals

- (England) Ashley Jackson
- (Netherlands) Taeke Taekema

6 goals

- (Australia) Glenn Turner

4 goals

- (Argentina) Lucas Vila
- (Australia) Desmond Abbott
- (Australia) Jamie Dwyer
- (Germany) Florian Fuchs
- (India) Sandeep Singh
- (New Zealand) Andrew Hayward
- (South Korea) Nam Hyun-Woo
- (South Korea) Lee Nam-Yong
- (Spain) Pau Quemada

3 goals

- (Argentina) Facundo Callioni
- (Canada) Phillip Wright
- (England) James Tindall
- (Germany) Martin Häner
- (Germany) Jan-Marco Montag
- (India) Shivendra Singh
- (Netherlands) Ronald Brouwer
- (Netherlands) Rogier Hofman
- (Pakistan) Rehan Butt
- (South Africa) Marvin Harper
- (South Africa) Lloyd Norris-Jones
- (South Korea) Jang Jong-Hyun
- (Spain) Pol Amat

2 goals

- (Argentina) Tomás Argento
- (Argentina) Matías Paredes
- (Canada) Mark Pearson
- (Canada) Scott Tupper
- (England) Jonathan Clarke
- (England) Richard Mantell
- (England) Barry Middleton
- (Germany) Moritz Fürste
- (Germany) Oliver Korn
- (Germany) Benjamin Weß
- (Germany) Matthias Witthaus
- (Germany) Martin Zwicker
- (India) Gurwinder Singh Chandi
- (India) Rajpal Singh
- (Netherlands) Teun de Nooijer
- (Netherlands) Rob Reckers
- (Pakistan) Sohail Abbas
- (Pakistan) Abdul Haseem Khan
- (South Africa) Ian Haley
- (South Africa) Taine Paton
- (South Africa) Justin Reid-Ross
- (South Korea) You Hyo-Sik
- (Spain) David Alegre
- (Spain) Roc Oliva

1 goal

- (Argentina) Mario Almada
- (Argentina) Pedro Ibarra
- (Australia) Matthew Butturini
- (Australia) Fergus Kavanagh
- (Australia) Edward Ockenden
- (Australia) Liam de Young
- (Canada) Connor Grimes
- (Canada) David Jameson
- (England) Alastair Brogdon
- (England) Nicholas Catlin
- (England) Iain Mackay
- (England) Robert Moore
- (England) Richard Smith
- (Germany) Linus Butt
- (Germany) Christoph Menke
- (Germany) Maximilian Müller
- (Germany) Philip Witte
- (India) Vikram Pillay
- (India) Diwakar Ram
- (India) Prabhjot Singh
- (India) Sarwanjit Singh
- (Netherlands) Jeroen Hertzberger
- (Netherlands) Wouter Jolie
- (Netherlands) Klaas Vermeulen
- (New Zealand) Ryan Archibald
- (New Zealand) Priyesh Bhana
- (New Zealand) Phil Burrows
- (New Zealand) Dean Couzins
- (New Zealand) Nicholas Haig
- (New Zealand) Hugo Inglis
- (New Zealand) Shea McAleese
- (New Zealand) Nicholas Wilson
- (Pakistan) Shakeel Abbasi
- (Pakistan) Waseem Ahmed
- (Pakistan) Akhtar Ali
- (Pakistan) Muhammad Imran
- (South Africa) Gareth Carr
- (South Africa) Thomas Hammond
- (South Africa) Julian Hykes
- (South Africa) Thornton McDade
- (South Africa) Austin Smith
- (South Korea) Hyun Hye-Sung
- (South Korea) Seo Jong-Ho
- (South Korea) Yoon Sung-Hoon
- (Spain) Rodrigo Garza
- (Spain) Albert Sala
- (Spain) Eduard Tubau

Source: FIH
