= 2010 Hockey World Cup =

2010 Hockey World Cup may refer to:

- 2010 Men's Hockey World Cup, a field hockey tournament in New Delhi, India
- 2010 Women's Hockey World Cup, a field hockey tournament in Rosario, Argentina

== See also ==
- 2010 IIHF World Championship, the men's world championship in ice hockey
