= Vincent Clark =

Vince or Vincent Clark (or Clarke) may refer to:

- Vince Clarke (born 1960), English musician
- Vince Clarke (cricketer) (born 1971), English cricketer
- Vin¢ Clarke (1922–1998), British science fiction fanwriter and editor
- Vinnie Clark (born 1969), American football cornerback
- Vince Clark, the main character in the British sitcom 15 Storeys High

== See also ==
- Vincent
