= List of Derbyshire County Cricket Club captains =

This is a list in alphabetical order of first-class cricketers who have played for Derbyshire County Cricket Club as team captain. Each captain's term of office is given in brackets after his name. Some captains had more than one term and there were seasons in which more than one player held the captaincy. The main sources are Roy Webber's Playfair Book of Cricket Records to 1950 and the relevant edition of Playfair Cricket Annual from 1951 to the present with further verification available on the player's CricketArchive profile.

The club was founded in 1870 and is classified as an important team by substantial sources from 1871 to 1887; classified as an official first-class team from 1895 by Marylebone Cricket Club (MCC) and the County Championship clubs; classified as a List A team since the beginning of limited overs cricket in 1963; and classified as a first-class Twenty20 team since the inauguration of the Twenty20 Cup in 2003.

== A ==
- Maynard Ashcroft (1905)

== B ==
- Richard Baggallay (1912–1914)
- Eddie Barlow (1977–1978)
- Kim Barnett (1983–1995)
- Brian Bolus (1973–1975)
- George Buckston (1921)
- Robin Buckston (1937–1939)
- Ian Buxton (1970–1972)

== C ==
- Donald Carr (1955–1962)
- John Chapman (1910–1911)
- William Chatterton (1887–1889)
- Rikki Clarke (2008)
- Dominic Cork (1998–2003)

== D ==
- Ludford Docker (1884)
- Leus du Plooy (2023)

== E ==
- Sydney Evershed (1891–1898)

== G ==
- Billy Godleman (2016–2022)
- Edward Gothard (1947–1948)

== H ==
- Samuel Hill-Wood (1899–1901)
- Gilbert Hodgkinson (1946)

== J ==
- Guy Jackson (1922–1930)
- Dean Jones (1996–1997)

== K ==
- Simon Katich (2007)

== L ==
- Albert Lawton (1902–1906 and 1908–1909)
- Charles Lee (1963–1964)

== M ==
- Wayne Madsen (2012–2015)
- Edmund Maynard (1885–1887)
- Geoff Miller (1979–1981)
- Derek Morgan (1965–1969)

== O ==
- Leonard Oliver (1919–1920)

== R ==
- Arthur Walker Richardson (1931–1936)
- Samuel Richardson (1871–1875)
- Chris Rogers (2009–2010)

== S ==
- David Skinner (1949)
- Robert Smith (1876–1883)
- Fred Spofforth (1890)
- David Steele (1979)
- Luke Sutton (2004–2005 and 2011)

== T ==
- Bob Taylor (1975–1976)

== V ==
- Pat Vaulkhard (1950)

== W ==
- Graeme Welch (2006)
- Guy Willatt (1951–1954)
- Barry Wood (1981–1983)
- Levi Wright (1906–1908)

== See also ==
- List of Derbyshire County Cricket Club players
