= Matthew Taylor (cricketer, born 1973) =

English cricketer

Matthew Taylor (born 13 November 1973) is a former English cricketer. He was a right-handed batsman and a left-arm slow bowler who played first-class cricket for Derbyshire in 1994.

Taylor represented Derbyshire in four matches during the 1994 season, and though it looked like he would benefit from the release of Richard Sladdin during 1994, Taylor found himself relegated to the second team, where he would find team-mates Andy Cottam and Tom Harrison ahead of him in the batting lineup.

Taylor was released at the end of 1995, and would not play competitive cricket again until 2000, when he represented Lancashire CB in the 2000 Natwest Trophy, and played many games in 2001 for the Lancashire second team, though he was not to receive a first-team contract and did not play any first-class or List A games for Lancashire.

During 1994, when Taylor played in a match against Middlesex, he was made a part of cricketing history as Richard Johnson's tenth victim of ten in a single innings, giving the Middlesex man the best single-innings bowling figures of his career, and the third-best single-innings bowling analysis in Middlesex's history.

Taylor's younger sister Jennifer Taylor represented the GB volleyball team in the 2012 London Olympics'. Taylor moved into teaching and serves as Head teacher at Lever Park Academy in Bolton (2017).
