= Antony Lea =

English cricketer

Personal information
- Full name: Antony Edward Lea
- Born: 29 September 1962 (age 64); Wolverhampton, Staffordshire, England
- Batting: Right-handed
- Bowling: Leg break

Domestic team information
- Years: Team
- 1993: Herefordshire
- 1988–1990: Staffordshire
- 1984–1986: Cambridge University

Career statistics
Competition	First-class
Matches	22
Runs scored	772
Batting average	19.79
100s/50s	1/1
Top score	119
Balls bowled	450
Wickets	8
Bowling average	36.50
5 wickets in innings	–
10 wickets in match	–
Best bowling	3/61
Catches/stumpings	11/–
- Source: Cricinfo, 22 August 2011

Antony Edward Lea (born 29 September 1962) is a former English cricketer. Lea was a right-handed batsman who bowled leg break. He was born in Wolverhampton, Staffordshire.

While studying for his degree at Cambridge University, Lea made his first-class debut for Cambridge University against Leicestershire in 1984. He made 21 further first-class appearances for the university, the last of which came against Oxford University in 1986. In his 22 first-class appearances, he scored 772 runs at an average of 19.79, with a high score of 119. His highest score, which was his only first-class century, came against Essex in 1984. With the ball, he took 8 wickets at a bowling average of 36.50, with best figures of 3/61.

In 1988, he made a single Minor Counties Championship appearance for Staffordshire against Cambridgeshire. He next played for Staffordshire in two MCCA Knockout Trophy matches in 1990, playing Oxfordshire. Later in the 1993 season, Lea played a single MCCA Knockout Trophy match for Herefordshire against Staffordshire.
