= Michael May =

Michael or Mike May may refer to:

- Michael May (racing driver) (born 1934), Swiss racing driver
- Mike May (Iowa politician) (born 1945), Iowa House of Representatives
- Mike May (skier) (born 1954), Paralympic alpine skier
- Michael May (born c.1970), known as Flourgon, Jamaican dancehall artist
- Michael May (cricketer) (born 1971), English cricketer
- Michael M. May (1925–2026), American theoretical physicist
