= Gul Khan =

Gul Khan may refer to:

- Gul Khan (cricketer) (born 1973), former Pakistani cricketer
- Gul Khan (producer), Indian television producer, writer and director
- Gul Hassan Khan (1921–1999), Pakistan Army general
- Gul Mohammad Khan (1876–1979), Bangladeshi musician
