= Michael Deane (cricketer) =

English cricketer

Michael Deane (born 9 March 1977) was an English cricketer. He was a right-handed batsman and a right-arm medium-pace bowler who played for Derbyshire in 1999.

Despite signing a contract in the 1999 season, after a successful run in the 1998 Second XI, and despite being amongst Dominic Cork's preferred non-signings for the Derbyshire team, he failed to appear often within the starting lineup of the first team, though his occasional swing bowling was enough to put even the most experienced of batsmen off, catching players like Anthony McGrath and Richard Blakey off guard.

Deane had been playing in the Second XI since 1994, where he debuted against a Durham team who drew their game after forfeiting their second innings. He appeared regularly in the Second XI Championship in 1998 and 1999, but only made two County Championship appearances, as a tailend batsman.
