= Henry Fotheringham =

South African cricketer

Personal information
- Full name: Henry Richard Fotheringham
- Born: 4 April 1953 (age 73); Empangeni, Natal Province, South Africa
- Batting: Right-handed
- Bowling: Right arm off-break
- Role: Batsman
- Relatives: Wayne Madsen (nephew)

Domestic team information
- Years: Team
- 1971/72–1977/78: Natal
- 1977: Gloucestershire
- 1978/79–1988/89: Transvaal
- 1989/90: Natal

Career statistics
Competition	First-class	List A
Matches	147	133
Runs scored	8,814	4,438
Batting average	40.06	39.98
100s/50s	21/48	7/26
Top score	184	156*
Balls bowled	1,002	28
Wickets	7	1
Bowling average	70.00	26.00
5 wickets in innings	0	0
10 wickets in match	0	0
Best bowling	3/48	1/7
Catches/stumpings	135/–	40/–
- Source: ESPNcricinfo, 10 July 2020

Henry Richard Fotheringham (born 4 April 1953) is a retired South African cricketer.

Fotheringham lived in Swaziland and Rhodesia as a child, and attended Ruzawi School and Michaelhouse. He represented Natal Schools at the 1969–70 Nuffield Week, and South African Schools at the 1970–71 Nuffield Week, and played rugby union, hockey, tennis, and squash at age group level.

Originally a right-handed middle-order batsman, Fotheringham made his first-class debut for Natal B against Transvaal B in section B of the Currie Cup in December 1971, and in section A for Natal a month later in January 1972 against Rhodesia. His List A debut came for Natal in February 1974, in a Gillette Cup match against Rhodesia.

Fotheringham moved to Transvaal ahead of the 1978–79 season, where he moved up the order and formed a prolific opening partnership with Jimmy Cook in a period when Transvaal dominated South African domestic cricket, before returning to play for Natal for the 1989–90 season. His final appearance for Natal came in the Benson & Hedges Series in March 1990. He also played two Second XI Championship matches for Gloucestershire in 1977. During his career Fotheringham scored 7,981 runs in the Currie Cup, the fifth-highest career runs total in the history of the tournament.

Due to the sporting boycott of South Africa during apartheid, Fotheringham never played an official Test match or One Day International for South Africa. However, he played in seven unofficial Test matches and fifteen unofficial One Day Internationals during the South African rebel tours, making his debut against the West Indies XI during their 1983–84 tour. His final first-class appearance came in the unofficial Test against the England XI during the 1989–90 rebel tour.
