= Wayne Madsen (sportsperson) =

Italian cricketer (born 1984)

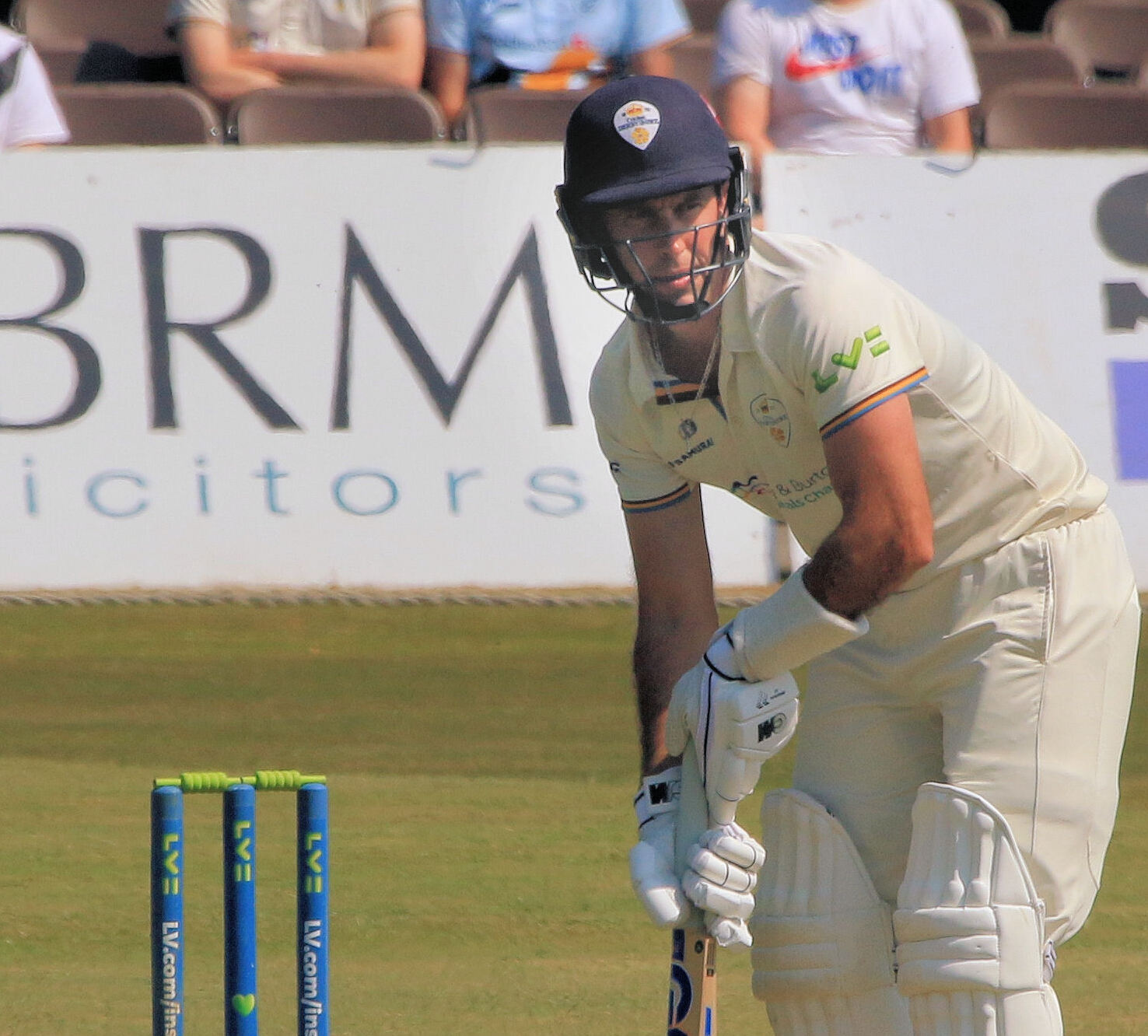
- Madsen batting for Derbyshire in 2023

Personal information
- Full name: Wayne Lee Madsen
- Born: 2 January 1984 (age 42); Durban, Natal Province, South Africa
- Batting: Right-handed
- Bowling: Right arm off break
- Relatives: Lloyd Madsen (brother); Henry Fotheringham (uncle); Michael Madsen (uncle); Trevor Madsen (uncle); Greg Fotheringham (cousin)

International information
- National side: Italy
- T20I debut (cap 42): 23 July 2023 v Jersey
- Last T20I: 9 February 2026 v Scotland

Domestic team information
- Years: Team
- 2003/04–2007/08: KwaZulu-Natal
- 2006/07–2007/08: Dolphins
- 2009–present: Derbyshire (squad no. 77)
- 2019: Peshawar Zalmi (squad no. 77)
- 2020: Multan Sultans
- 2021–2024: Manchester Originals
- 2024: Joburg Super Kings
- 2024: Rangpur Riders
- 2025: London Spirit

Career statistics
Competition	T20I	FC	LA	T20
Matches	8	265	123	232
Runs scored	205	17,790	4,024	5,770
Batting average	34.16	41.27	42.35	30.69
100s/50s	0/2	45/95	9/21	2/36
Top score	61*	231*	138	109*
Balls bowled	–	3,666	740	593
Wickets	–	39	18	22
Bowling average	–	50.82	33.66	36.81
5 wickets in innings	–	0	0	0
10 wickets in match	–	0	0	0
Best bowling	–	3/45	3/27	2/20
Catches/stumpings	5/–	316/–	82/–	92/–
- Source: ESPNcricinfo, 27 September 2026

Wayne Lee Madsen (born 2 January 1984) is a South African-born Italian sportsman who plays professional cricket and previously played field hockey for the South Africa men's national field hockey team. He has represented Derbyshire County Cricket Club in English county cricket since 2009, after earlier playing domestic cricket in South Africa, and has also played franchise cricket. He is a right-handed batsman and occasional right-arm off spin bowler. He made his debut for the Italy national cricket team in 2023, qualifying as a citizen by descent.

== Cricket career ==
Hailing from a strong cricketing family, with uncles Henry Fotheringham, Michael Madsen, Trevor Madsen and cousin Greg Fotheringham all playing first-class cricket in South Africa, Madsen made his debut in 2003 for KwaZulu-Natal cricket team. In August 2009 he signed his contract with Derbyshire, following a strong run of form with two centuries in four games. He captained Derbyshire for four seasons; in the 2012 season, Derbyshire were promoted from County Championship Division Two to Division One. Although they were relegated the following season, Madsen accumulated 1,221 runs and was named the Cricket Writers' Club Championship's Player of the Season. After gaining UK citizenship in February 2015, Madsen announced that he hoped to represent England in the future. Ahead of the 2016 season, he signed a contract extension until 2019. He also stepped down as Derbyshire's County Championship captain, and was replaced by Billy Godleman. In the 2017 t20 Blast, Madsen scored 526 runs, a record for a Derbyshire player in the competition. Madsen later signed a contract extension with Derbyshire until 2022.

Madsen has also played in the Pakistan Super League. He has signed for Manchester Originals for The Hundred. In April 2022, he was bought by the Manchester Originals for the 2022 season of The Hundred. On 31 May 2022, in the T20 Blast against the Yorkshire Vikings, Madsen played in his 400th match for Derbyshire. On 3 July 2022, also in the T20 Blast, Madsen scored his first century in Twenty20 cricket, with 100 not out against Durham. Madsen was included in the Italy squad for the 2023 T20 World Cup Europe Regional Final.

Madsen was reappointed as Derbyshire captain in March 2025.

In December 2025, Madsen was appointed captain of Italy ahead of the 2026 Men's T20 World Cup, their first appearance in the competition, replacing Joe Burns. In the first match of the World Cup, against Scotland, Madsen dislocated his shoulder, bringing doubts to his further participation in the remaining tournament.

== Hockey career ==
Madsen made 39 appearances for the South Africa men's national field hockey team. He represented South Africa at the 2006 Commonwealth Games and 2006 Men's Hockey World Cup. In 2015, he became Director of Hockey at Belper Hockey Club. His brother Lloyd has also played hockey for South Africa.

Sporting positions
Preceded by Luke Sutton; David Lloyd	Derbyshire County Cricket Club captain 2012–2016; 2025–present	Succeeded by Billy Godleman; Incumbent
