= Christopher Durham =

English cricketer

Personal information
- Full name: Christopher Michael Durham
- Born: 4 March 1992 (age 34); Stockport, Greater Manchester, England
- Height: 1.75 m (5 ft 9 in)
- Batting: Right-handed
- Role: Wicket-keeper

Domestic team information
- Years: Team
- 2012–present: Derbyshire

Career statistics
Competition	Twenty20
Matches	1
Runs scored	12
Batting average	0.00
100s/50s	0/0
Top score	12*
Balls bowled	–
Wickets	–
Bowling average	–
5 wickets in innings	–
10 wickets in match	–
Best bowling	–
Catches/stumpings	–/–
- Source: Cricinfo, 9 July 2012

Christopher Michael Durham (born 4 March 1992) is an English cricketer. Durham is a right-handed batsman who fields as a wicket-keeper. He was born at Stockport, Greater Manchester and attended Chapel-en-le-Frith High School and Cheadle and Marple Sixth Form College.

Durham made his debut for Derbyshire in a Twenty20 match against Yorkshire in the 2012 Friends Life t20 at Headingley. Derbyshire won the toss and elected to put Yorkshire into bat. Yorkshire then made 180/5 from their 20 overs. In their chase, Derbyshire could only manage 159/9 from their 20 overs, with Durham being dismissed for a duck by Mitchell Starc.

Christopher Durham made his first and to date only First-class appearance playing for Derbyshire against Australia where he took 2 catches and got in to bat in the second innings scoring a respectable 12 not out.
