= William Wallis (cricketer) =

English cricketer

William Alfred Wallis (14 December 1878 — 12 November 1939) was an English cricketer who played for Derbyshire during the 1906 season.

Wallis was born in Long Eaton, Derbyshire the son of William Wallis and his wife Emma. His father was a lace manufacturer with the firm of Wallis and Sons

Wallis made his first and only first-class appearance for Derbyshire in May 1906 against Marylebone Cricket Club. Wallis was bowled out in his first innings on 6 by Walter Mead, and in the second on 11 by Alec Hearne. He was a right-handed batsman, and made one catch in the outfield.

Wallis died in Wilsthorpe at the age of 50.
