= Christopher Whyatt =

English cricketer

Christopher Whyatt (born 12 June 1954) is a former English cricketer. He was a right-handed batsman and a wicket-keeper who played for Derbyshire.

A product of Derbyshire Schools and Colts, both of which he captained, Whyatt made his debut for the Second XI team in 1972, whilst pursuing a master's degree in education at the University of Nottingham.

Whyatt continued to appear for the Second XI into the 1978 season before taking up a teaching post, though he continued to play as a professional in the Yorkshire League.
