= David Womble =

English cricketer

Personal information
- Full name: David Robert Womble
- Born: 23 February 1977 (age 49); Stoke-on-Trent, Staffordshire, England
- Batting: Right-handed
- Bowling: Right-arm medium

Domestic team information
- Years: Team
- 1996: Derbyshire
- 1996–2007: Staffordshire

Career statistics
Competition	List A
Matches	12
Runs scored	151
Batting average	16.77
100s/50s	–/–
Top score	49
Balls bowled	402
Wickets	6
Bowling average	71.66
5 wickets in innings	–
10 wickets in match	–
Best bowling	3/42
Catches/stumpings	1/–
- Source: Cricinfo, 20 June 2011

David Robert Womble (born 23 February 1977) is an English cricketer. Womble is a right-handed batsman who bowls right-arm medium pace. He was born in Stoke-on-Trent, Staffordshire.

Womble made his debut for Staffordshire in the 1996 Minor Counties Championship against Lincolnshire. Having made just a single appearance for Staffordshire, Womble was signed by an injury hit Derbyshire on a one match contract to play against Sussex in the 1996 AXA Equity and Law League. His lone appearance was not a successful one, with Womble conceding 29 runs from 3 wicket-less overs. Womble did however remain a key member of the Staffordshire team, who he played Minor counties cricket for from 1996 to 2007, making 60 Minor Counties Championship appearances and 31 MCCA Knockout Trophy appearances. In 1997, he made his debut for Staffordshire in List A cricket against Nottinghamshire in the NatWest Trophy. He made 10 further List A appearances for Staffordshire, the last coming against Surrey in the 2005 Cheltenham & Gloucester Trophy. In his 11 List A matches for the county, he scored 151 runs at an average of 16.77, with a high score of 49. With the ball, he took 6 wickets at a bowling average of 66.83, with best figures of 3/42.
