= Tim Tweats =

English cricketer

Personal information
- Full name: Timothy Andrew Tweats
- Born: 18 April 1974 (age 52); Stoke-on-Trent, England
- Batting: Right-handed
- Bowling: Right-arm medium pace

Domestic team information
- Years: Team
- 1992–1999: Derbyshire
- 1992, 2000: Staffordshire

Career statistics
Competition	FC	LA
Matches	33	35
Runs scored	1405	315
Batting average	24.64	13.69
100s/50s	2/4	0/0
Top score	189	42*
Balls bowled	298	24
Wickets	4	0
Bowling average	59.25	-
5 wickets in innings	0	0
10 wickets in match	0	0
Best bowling	1/23	0/27
Catches/stumpings	29/-	10/-
- Source: CricketArchive (subscription required)

Timothy Andrew Tweats (born 18 April 1974) is a former English cricketer. He was a right-handed batsman and a right-arm medium-pace bowler who played for Derbyshire between 1992 and 1999, and for Staffordshire in 2000.

As a youth, Tweats was a promising footballer, spending time in Port Vale's youth system.

He made his debut for Derbyshire in a loss against Glamorgan, though, playing as a lower-middle order batsman, he barely disgraced himself, being caught at 24.

He did not play first-class cricket again until the 1995 season, spending all of 1993 and a significant portion of 1994 in the Second XI. A slow starter upon his return, he excelled in the 1997 season, where he hit his debut first-class century, before making a career-best score of 189, and finishing high in the batting averages for the season. During his high-scoring innings, Kim Barnett partnered him to a county record second-wicket stand of 417, a record which stands to this day.

Tweats retired from First-class cricket at the end of the 1999 season to focus on higher education.

In 2000 Tweats played for Staffordshire.
