= Kasir Shah =

Pakistani cricketer

Kasir Zamir Shah (born 15, June 1978) was a Pakistani cricketer. He was a left-handed batsman and a left-arm medium-fast bowler who played for Derbyshire between 1999 and 2000.

Shah's Cricket career began at Warwickshire, where he played in the Second XI from 1996, but it was at Derbyshire he was at his most notable, after playing for the team thanks to sponsorship from businessmen. Though 2000 was a bad year for most concerned, captain Tim Munton was unprepared to let Shah bowl, and he was not offered a contract for the 2001 season.

An uncharacteristically patient tailender, he would stick at the crease and defend much longer than his status down the order would appear to imply.
