= George Marple =

English cricketer and businessman

George Smith Marple (14 August 1868 — 12 August 1932) was an English businessman and cricketer who played for Derbyshire in 1901.

Marple was born in Chester the son of George I. Marple, a joiner and builder, and his wife Mary.

Marple made a single first-class appearance for Derbyshire during the 1901 season, against London County. He played one innings in which he scored six runs. He bowled thirteen overs during the match, taking 1 wicket for 17. He played for the Millhouses cricket club of which he was captain in 1907.

Marple was a partner in the scrap metal business of Marple and Gillott Ltd, Sheffield, which broke up railway engines. He was involved in the LLoyd George cash for honours affair having been invited to contribute £5000 for a knighthood.

In 1919 Marple applied for a patent for a carburettor design with James Frederick Bennett. In 1921 he donated a cup as the Marple Trophy for a brass band contest

Marple died in Ecclesall, Sheffield at the age of 63.

He married Florence Madoline Gillott in 1893.
