= Ben Spendlove =

English cricketer

Benjamin Lee Spendlove (born November 4, 1978 in Belper, Derbyshire) was a professional English cricketer.

== Early life ==
A student of Trent College in Long Eaton, Spendlove became a cricket player via originally playing rugby. His father, Lee, was a groundsman at a local cricket club.

== Career ==
A right-handed batsman who also bowled off-breaks, Spendlove made his debut for Derbyshire in the 1997 season. Considered a promising prospect, Spendlove would win the Denis Compton Award as the county's most promising young player in the same year. That would see him called up for England at two youth levels, but most notably the Under-19s, where he played two one-day internationals against Pakistan. He also received praise for his form during Derbyshire's surprise run to the 1998 Natwest Trophy Final.

Despite this, he struggled to nail down a regular place in the team, and was released in 2001. After a few seasons in club cricket, he impressed enough to earn a one-day contract with Derbyshire again in 2004, after which he would play for two more years, leaving again in 2005. Across his two spells, he would ultimately play 20 first-class games for Derbyshire, averaging 19.29 and scoring two fifties, along with 32 List A games, averaging 14.30.

He would continue his career in the Minor Counties, playing with Cheshire until 2010 alongside his return to club cricket.

Outside his county career, he was perhaps best known for attracting media attention by taking two catches for the England test team while acting as a substitute fielder for Darren Gough at Edgbaston in 1998.

During the local league years of his career, he combined playing with a job at East Midlands Airport.
