= Ewan McCray =

English cricketer

Ewan McCray (born 29 October 1964) is an English former cricketer. He was a right-handed batsman and a right-arm off-break bowler. Having debuted in the Second XI Championship in 1990 for Derbyshire, he was to soon become a focal point of their financial troubles, as he only managed to play one County Championship game.

McCray also played for the Bain Clarkson Trophy between 1990 and 1993 and, in 2002, reprised his career by playing one match for Cheshire, for whom he had played prior to entering First-class cricket.

McCray often played as a lower-order/tailender batsman in List A cricket, sharing this role with Denmark's Ole Mortensen. Notably, despite bowling 42 overs of cricket in his first-class career, and having a decent ratio of maidens to overs, he failed to take a single wicket.

He was a teacher of physical education at Parrs Wood High School in Manchester, and captain of Cheadle Hulme CC's 'Over 40's' team.
