= Brian Krikken =

English cricketer

Cricket information
- Batting: Left-handed

Career statistics
Competition	First-class
Matches	3
Runs scored	8
Batting average	2.66
100s/50s	0/0
Top score	4
Catches/stumpings	7/0
- Source: Cricinfo, 28 November 2020

Brian Egbert Krikken (born 26 August 1946) is a former English first-class cricketer who played three matches for Lancashire and Worcestershire in the late 1960s. He was born in Horwich, Lancashire.

Krikken played a large number of games for Lancashire's Second XI between 1965 and 1968, but the county persisted with Keith Goodwin as first-team keeper and Krikken appeared for them only twice at first-class level, making little impression on either occasion: against Oxford University in 1966 he took three catches and scored 4 and 0, while against Scotland the following year he took two catches but did not bat in either innings.

In 1969 Krikken moved to Worcestershire, but again was unable to dislodge the first-choice keeper (in this case Rodney Cass) and was selected only once, against Cambridge University, taking two catches and being dismissed for 4 in his only innings. Even at Second XI level his batting was poor: he never reached 30 in more than 40 innings.

He is the father of Karl Krikken, who had a long career with Derbyshire.
