= Robert Rollins =

English cricketer

Personal information
- Full name: Robert John Rollins
- Born: 30 January 1974 (age 52); Plaistow, London, England
- Batting: Right-handed
- Bowling: Right-arm medium
- Role: Wicketkeeper
- Relatives: Adrian Rollins (brother)

Domestic team information
- Years: Team
- 2003: Cambridgeshire
- 2002: Huntingdonshire
- 2000–2001: Cambridgeshire
- 1992–1999: Essex

Career statistics
Competition	FC	LA
Matches	69	109
Runs scored	2258	1,197
Batting average	22.35	17.86
100s/50s	1/11	–/6
Top score	133*	87
Balls bowled	–	–
Wickets	–	–
Bowling average	–	–
5 wickets in innings	–	–
10 wickets in match	–	–
Best bowling	–	–
Catches/stumpings	158/21	87/26
- Source: Cricinfo, 3 September 2010

Robert John Rollins (born 30 January 1974) is a former English cricketer. Rollins was a right-handed batsman who bowled right-arm medium pace, but played primarily as a wicketkeeper.

In a career that lasted 11 years, he represented Essex in first-class cricket and List-A cricket, Cambridgeshire in Minor Counties and List-A cricket and Huntingdonshire in List-A cricket.

In his 7-year career with Essex, he forged a successful, if inconsistent first-class career. He played 69 first-class matches, where he scored 2,258 runs at a batting average of 22.35, with 11 half centuries and a single century. His highest score in first-class cricket was 133*. Behind the stumps he took 158 catches and made 21 stumpings. In List-A cricket, he played from 1993 to 2003 with a number of counties, playing a total of 109 matches, where he scored 1,197 runs at an average of 17.86. In the process, he made 6 half centuries with a high score of 87*. Behind the stumps he took 87 catches and made 26 stumpings.

His brother Adrian played first-class and List A cricket for Derbyshire and Northamptonshire.
