= Oliver Saffell =

English cricketer

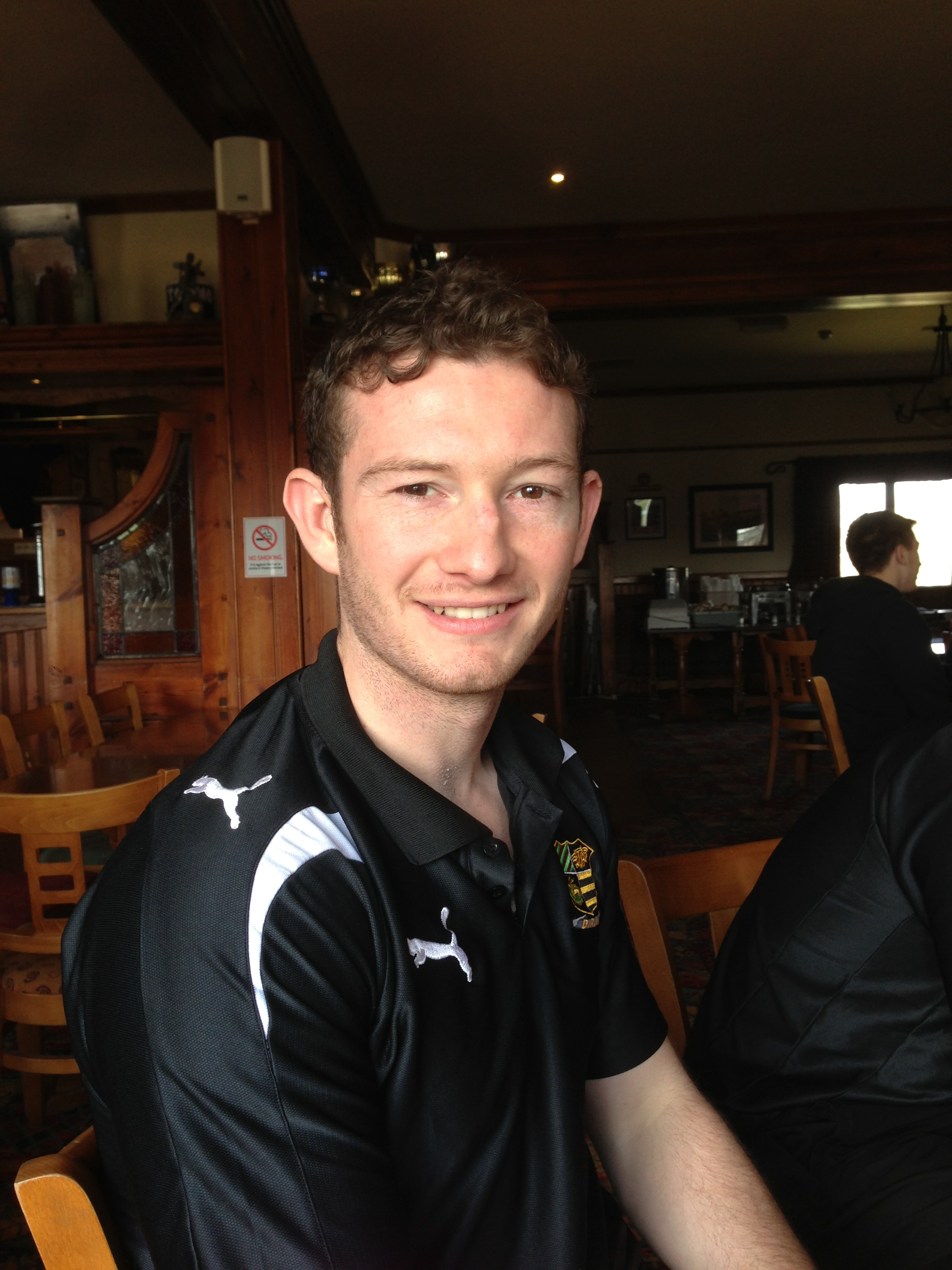

Personal information
- Full name: Oliver Henry James Saffell
- Born: 16 July 1986 (age 40); Derby, Derbyshire, England
- Height: 6 ft 1 in (1.85 m)
- Batting: Right-handed
- Bowling: Right-arm fast-medium
- Role: Bowler

Domestic team information
- Years: Team
- 2007: Derbyshire
- Only FC: 25 April 2007 Derbyshire v Cambridge UCCE

Career statistics
Competition	First-class
Matches	1
Runs scored	35
Batting average	–
100s/50s	0/0
Top score	35*
Balls bowled	97
Wickets	5
Bowling average	11.80
5 wickets in innings	0
10 wickets in match	0
Best bowling	3/37
Catches/stumpings	0/–
- Source: CricketArchive (subscription required), 12 January 2016

Oliver Henry James Saffell (born 16 July 1986) is an English cricketer. He is a right-handed batsman and a right-arm medium-fast bowler who formerly played for Derbyshire. He was born in Derby.

== Career ==
Saffell made his Second XI debut against Yorkshire in June 2005, bowling 10 overs for 41 runs.

He also plays rugby for Derby Rugby Club.

Saffell's first-class debut took place in April 2007, when he took part in a draw against Cambridge University Cricket Club, in which Danish acquisition Frederik Klokker also made his Derbyshire debut. Saffell and Klokker aided Derbyshire to a draw, with the pair scoring 135 runs between them, including 35 not out for Saffell batting at number 11.

Saffell is currently signed to the MCC Young Cricketers and is based at lords.

Saffell was also 12th man for England against South Africa in 2008, and West Indies in 2009.
