= Ian Redpath (English cricketer) =

English cricketer (born 1965)

Personal information
- Full name: Ian Redpath
- Born: 12 September 1965 (age 61); Basildon, Essex, England
- Batting: Right-handed
- Bowling: Right-arm leg-break / medium

Domestic team information
- Years: Team
- 1987: Essex
- 1989: Derbyshire
- First-class debut: 20 May 1987; Essex v Glamorgan
- Last First-class: 11 July 1989; Derbyshire v Middlesex
- List A debut: 24 May 1987; Essex v Surrey
- Last List A: 9 July 1989; Derbyshire v Middlesex

Career statistics
| Competition | FC | LA |
|---|---|---|
| Matches | 10 | 4 |
| Runs scored | 216 | 20 |
| Batting average | 14.40 | 20.00 |
| 100s/50s | 0/0 | 0/0 |
| Top score | 46 | 11* |
| Balls bowled | 30 | 0 |
| Wickets | 0 | – |
| Bowling average | – | – |
| 5 wickets in innings | – | – |
| 10 wickets in match | – | – |
| Best bowling | – | – |
| Catches/stumpings | 2/– | 0/– |
- Source: CricketArchive, 26 September 2007

Ian Redpath (born 12 September 1965) is a former English first-class cricketer, who had a brief county career with Essex and Derbyshire in the late 1980s.

In May 1985, playing for Essex Second XI against Kent Second XI in the Second Eleven Championship, he scored 118 not out, sharing in an unbroken stand of 374 for the second wicket with Alan Lilley (224 not out).
