= St Edmund Campion Catholic School =

Location
- Sutton Road; Erdington; Birmingham, West Midlands, B23 5XA; England; 52.5302°N 1.8305°W

Information
- Type: Academy
- Religious affiliation: Roman Catholic
- Established: September 1976
- Local authority: Birmingham City Council
- Trust: St John Paul II MAC
- Department for Education URN: 147707 Tables
- Ofsted: Reports
- Chair of Governors: M Daly
- Headteacher: A Grant
- Gender: Coeducational
- Age: 11 to 18
- Enrolment: 1052
- Houses: Chad, Harvington, Maryvale and Oscott.
- Colours: Yellow, Red, Black/White and Purple
- Website: http://www.stedcamp.bham.sch.uk/

St Edmund Campion Catholic School is a coeducational Catholic secondary school and sixth form located on the corner of Holly Lane and Sutton New Road in the Erdington area of Birmingham, England.

== History ==
In September 1975, Sister Bernadette, headmistress of St. Margaret Clitherow School, Sister Ingrid, headmistress of St. Agnes’ school and Mr. Doherty, Headmaster of St. Thomas of Canterbury handed over their keys to Mr. Loughran, the headmaster of the newly formed St. Edmund Campion School, which opened using the three sites of the constituent schools.

Until September 2004, the school was situated on two sites. Works completed in 2005 integrated the campus.

In September 2005, the school was granted Specialist Language college status.

Previously a voluntary aided school administered by Birmingham City Council, in February 2020 St Edmund Campion Catholic School converted to academy status. The school is now sponsored by the St John Paul II Multi-Academy Company.

The school benefits from retreats to Soli House, Ogwen Cottage an outdoor activities centre in Snowdonia, Alton Castle. Members of the student body make annual pilgrimages to Lourdes with the Birmingham Diocese.

== Notable former pupils ==
- Mark Burke (b. 1969) - footballer, Aston Villa FC, Wolverhampton Wanderers FC, Middlesbrough FC
- Gary Steer (b. 1970) - Cricketer, Warwickshire CCC, Derbyshire CCC
- Darren Byfield (b. 1976) - footballer, Millwall F.C.
- Michael Ricketts (b. 1978) - footballer, Bolton Wanderers F.C., England national football team
- Gabriel Agbonlahor (b. 1986) - footballer, Aston Villa F.C., England national football team
- Barry Bannan (b. 1989) - footballer, Aston Villa F.C.
- Luke Lennon-Ford (b. 1989) - athlete, hurdler
- Oscar Gobern (b. 1991) - footballer, Southampton F.C.
- Jo Enright - comedian, appeared in Phoenix Nights, Lab Rats, Time Trumpet, Peter Kay's Britain's Got the Pop Factor..., I'm Alan Partridge
