= James Billyeald =

English cricketer

Personal information
- Full name: James Billyeald
- Born: 20 January 1835; Hyson Green, Nottingham, England
- Died: 8 July 1890 (aged 55); Hyson Green, England
- Batting: Right-handed
- Bowling: Round-arm medium

Domestic team information
- Years: Team
- 1871: Derbyshire
- Only FC: 17 August 1871 Derbyshire v Lancashire

Career statistics
Competition	First-class
Matches	1
Runs scored	15
Batting average	15.00
100s/50s	0/0
Top score	11*
Catches/stumpings	0/–
- Source: CricketArchive, 14 December 2010

James Billyeald (20 January 1835 – 8 July 1890) was an English cricketer who played for Derbyshire in 1871.

Billyeald was born at Hyson Green near Nottingham, the son of Thomas Billyeald and his wife Annis Hallam. He became a commercial traveller for wares, groceries and seeds and was living at Wirksworth. Between 1866 and 1870 he played cricket for various teams including Wirksworth Cricket Club, Nottingham Commercial Club and Gentlemen of Derbyshire. In 1871 he was living at Dale House, Wirksworth.

Billyeald played for Derbyshire in the 1871 season in their second match against Lancashire in August. Following a promising 11 not-out innings from a tailend position in the first innings, Billyeald switched to the upper order in the second and made 4. Billyeald was a right-handed batsman and played two innings in one first-class match and a total of 15 runs. He was a round-arm medium-pace bowler.

Billyeald died in Hyson Green at the age of 55.

Billyeald married Matilda Mounteney at Radford Nottinghamshire in 1859.
