= Michael Bentley (cricketer) =

English cricketer

Michael Bentley (born 14 February 1934) is a former English cricketer. He played as a left-handed batsman for Derbyshire County Cricket Club in 1957. He was born at Rotherham in Yorkshire.

Bentley played just one match for the county, against Cambridge University at Fenner's in June. As an opening batsman he scored two runs in his first innings and 10 in his second, and did not play first-class cricket again.
