= Mark Wakefield (cricketer) =

English cricketer

Mark Wakefield (born 17 November 1968) was an English cricketer. He was a right-handed batsman and a left-handed slow bowler who played for Derbyshire in 1987.

Wakefield played the first game in his career for Lancashire in 1985, making one second XI appearance against the Peakites. He played for three years in the Second XI Trophy, where he alternated as a tailender along with Paul Taylor. He made one first-class appearance in 1987, and played in the Second XI for Derbyshire until 1989. In his last season of Second XI cricket, he played for Somerset.

Wakefield played in 2005 for Milnrow in the first division of the Lake Garage Central Lancashire League, alongside New Zealand Test player Paul Wiseman.
