= Anthony Woolley =

English cricketer

Personal information
- Full name: Anthony Paul Woolley
- Born: 4 December 1971 (age 54); Derby, Derbyshire, England
- Batting: Right-handed
- Bowling: Right-arm medium

Domestic team information
- Years: Team
- 1999: Derbyshire

Career statistics
Competition	First-class	List A
Matches	1	5
Runs scored	9	2
Batting average	4.50	1.00
100s/50s	–/–	–/–
Top score	8	1*
Balls bowled	66	186
Wickets	0	5
Bowling average	–	36.20
5 wickets in innings	–	–
10 wickets in match	–	–
Best bowling	–	4/61
Catches/stumpings	–/–	–/–
- Source: Cricinfo, 19 June 2022

Anthony Paul Woolley (born 4 December 1971) is an English cricketer. He was a right-handed batsman and a right-arm medium-pace bowler who played for Derbyshire during three years in cricket.

He first played for Derbyshire's second team in 1997, in a drawn match, though it was not until two years later that he played first-class cricket for the team, in one match against Essex in June 1999. He played sporadically during the 1999 season in Division Two of the National League, though Derbyshire performed poorly and he was not to be selected for a second year.

He played club cricket for Alvaston and Boulton in the Derbyshire Premier Cricket League until 2011.
