= Simon Lacey =

English cricketer (born 1975)

- Born: (9th March, 1975)
- Occupation: Cricketer

Simon James Lacey (born 9 March 1975) is a former English cricketer who played first-class cricket for Derbyshire between in 1997.

Lacey debuted in the Second XI Championship in 1992 and made his first appearance for the first eleven five years later in the 1997 season. When he played against Hampshire in August 2000, he achieved his best batting figures, one of two half-century innings of his career. Simon James Lacey was a right-handed batsman and a right-arm off-break bowler with best figures of 4-84 against Hampshire.

Most recently, Lacey has starred in the Derbyshire Premier League for Chesterfield where he became the first ever player to reach 500 Premier League wickets.

In 2015, Lacey moved back to his hometown club, Langley Mill as player coach where he helped them gain promotion from Division 1 to the Premier League
