= Rodney Cass =

English cricketer

Personal information
- Full name: George Rodney Cass
- Born: 23 April 1940; Overton, Wakefield, Yorkshire, England
- Died: 14 August 2018 (aged 78)
- Batting: Left-handed
- Role: wicket-keeper

Domestic team information
- Years: Team
- 1964–1967: Essex
- 1969–1975: Worcestershire
- 1970/71–1972/73: Tasmania

Career statistics
Competition	FC	LA
Matches	155	98
Runs scored	4,304	1,439
Batting average	21.84	21.16
100s/50s	2/16	0/5
Top score	172*	77
Balls bowled	0	0
Wickets	–	–
Bowling average	–	–
5 wickets in innings	–	–
10 wickets in match	–	–
Best bowling	–	–
Catches/stumpings	213/28	79/13
- Source: CricketArchive, 14 October 2008

George Rodney Cass (23 April 1940 – 14 August 2018) was an English cricketer: a wicket-keeper who played first-class cricket for Essex and Worcestershire in England, and for Tasmania in Australia, in the 1960s and 1970s. He was capped by Worcestershire in 1970. He was born at Overton, Wakefield, Yorkshire, and educated at Dewsbury Technical College.

== Biography ==
Cass played for Yorkshire's Second XI in 1962, before moving to Essex in 1963. He made his first-class debut against Glamorgan at Clacton-on-Sea in late July 1964, when he scored 7 and took one catch (to dismiss opposing keeper Eifion Jones). That was his only such appearance of the season; the following year he played four matches, but scored only 49 runs and made just three dismissals in total.

1966 saw Cass play a full part in an Essex season for the first time: he hit 772 first-class runs at a shade over 20 and claimed 14 catches and two stumpings; with Brian Taylor as the regular wicket-keeper and captain of the Essex side at this time, his opportunities to keep wicket were limited and he played for Essex largely as a specialist batsman. He scored two half-centuries in 1966, of which the higher was the 65 he struck against Cambridge University in June. His achievement in this game was somewhat overshadowed by that of Keith Boyce, playing only his second first-class match, who took career-best figures of 9–61 in the first innings. Cass also made his List A debut in 1966, when he played for Essex against Worcestershire in the Gillette Cup. In 1967 Cass scored his maiden first-class century, 104 not out against Warwickshire in early July. However, he did not play at all in the second half of that season, nor (a few Second XI games in August excepted) throughout 1968.

When Cass's first-class career finally resumed in 1969, it was with a new county, Worcestershire, where he played as wicket-keeper and batsman. He enjoyed a most productive season with both bat and gloves: in first-class cricket he hit 756 runs and made 48 dismissals (44 ct, 4 st) while in one-day cricket he scored 334 runs and claimed 21 dismissals (16 ct, 5 st). All these figures were either career bests or second to just one other season. His form dipped slightly in 1970, but he could be consoled with the award of his county cap.

In 1970–71, Cass played several games in Australia for Tasmania, though he enjoyed very little success: in two first-class and one List A game he had a top score of 21 and claimed no dismissals at all. Back in England for 1971 his season was broken into two halves as he played no games in June or July, Gordon Wilcock having taken his place behind the stumps. Cass had a wretched time even when he did play, with a first-class average of under 10 and a top score of 30 from 12 innings. His two 1971–72 outings for Tasmania proved little more successful with the bat than they had the previous English winter, with 59 runs coming from four innings, and he still made only one dismissal.

1972 was, if anything, even worse than the previous year had been: Cass scored a grand total of 21 runs in five first-class innings, with seven catches. He did redeem himself somewhat in the one-day game, with 119 runs in six innings (top score 36) to put with his six catches, and he claimed four dismissals in an outing as pro for Lowerhouse of the Lancashire League, but real success would have to wait for the winter, when he finally came good for Tasmania. In mid-December he scored 38 and 73 against the touring Pakistanis, and followed it up immediately with 87 for a Tasmania Combined XI against the same opposition three days later.

His last three years of first-class cricket were exclusively for Worcestershire. In 1973 he played regularly, and finished with 50 first-class dismissals for the only summer of his career. His 23 List A dismissals were also the highest he managed in one season. He played only the first half of 1974, but did play for most of 1975 once he had re-established himself in the team at the start of June. A notable performance in a minor game was the 75 he struck, opening the batting, against the Indians in a warm-up match for the 1975 Cricket World Cup. Two days later he made by some way his highest first-class score when he hit 172* against Leicestershire at Grace Road, sharing in an unbroken third-wicket stand of 269 with Jim Yardley.

Cass played his last first-class and List A games for Worcestershire in mid-September 1975. Thereafter, he played on in minor counties cricket for some years for Shropshire, making 103* against Somerset Second XI in 1978. In both 1976 and 1978 he represented Shropshire at List A level in the Gillette Cup, although on neither occasion was he particularly successful. He was county club captain in 1979–1981. He also played minor cricket for Marylebone Cricket Club (MCC), accompanying them on several tours of Ireland, and played in a rain-affected game for Worcestershire Norton Taverners of the Midland Combined Counties League in 1996, aged 56. By this time he was also employed as an MCC coach, and in that capacity made a trip to Guttsta Cricket Park in Sweden in 1996.

He played cricket at club level for Pudsey St Lawrence and Great Chell.

Cass died on 14 August 2018 at the age of 78.

== See also ==
- List of Tasmanian representative cricketers
