= Glenn Roberts (cricketer) =

English cricketer

Glenn Martin Roberts (born 4 November 1973) is a former English cricketer who played for Derbyshire between 1996 and 2002.

In the early part of Roberts' career, he played Second XI cricket for Essex, Worcestershire and Glamorgan. He signed in 1996 for Derbyshire, for whom he played at First-class level.

After appearing in a debut match which more-or-less put Derbyshire out of the running for the 1996 County Championship title, despite making a half-century himself.

He continued to perform for Derbyshire well into 1998, primarily as a batsman, but as 1999 came, and the whole team suffered a dip in form, Roberts was out of the side. Team-mate Ian Blackwell's bowling skill had developed, and Roberts was surplus to requirements. He was not re-signed by any team until 2001, when he appeared in the Minor Counties Championship for Herefordshire. He was a left-handed batsman and a slow left-arm bowler

Glenn recently became a professional umpire in his hometown region. Glenn has umpired at some of the top venues around the country.

Glenn continues to pass on his cricketing knowledge taking up a career in teaching and is a respected physical education teacher in the North of England.
