= Adrian Rollins =

English cricketer

Personal information
- Full name: Adrian Rollins
- Born: 8 February 1972 (age 54); Barking, Essex
- Nickname: Rollie
- Height: 6 ft 5 in (1.96 m)
- Batting: Right-handed
- Bowling: Right-arm medium
- Role: Occasional wicket-keeper
- Relatives: Robert Rollins (brother)

Domestic team information
- Years: Team
- 1993–1999: Derbyshire
- 2000–2002: Northamptonshire

Career statistics
Competition	First-class	List A
Matches	129	102
Runs scored	7,331	1,911
Batting average	34.41	22.22
100s/50s	13/40	2/7
Top score	210	126*
Balls bowled	90	12
Wickets	1	0
Bowling average	122.00	–
5 wickets in innings	0	0
10 wickets in match	0	0
Best bowling	1/19	–
Catches/stumpings	109/1	40/–
- Source: Cricinfo, 10 June 2011

Adrian Rollins (born 8 February 1972) is an English cricketer who played for Derbyshire from 1993 to 1999 and for Northamptonshire from 2000 to 2002. He was a right-handed batsman and a right-arm medium-pace bowler.

An imposing presence, measuring 6 ft 5 in and weighing around sixteen stone, Rollins made his debut for Derbyshire as an emergency wicket-keeper in the absence of teammates Bernie Maher and Karl Krikken, making him possibly the tallest wicket-keeper in first-class cricket history. Rollins became the 500th first-class cricketer for the Derbyshire team, as well as the 100th to make a first-class century, following his milestone innings with a hugely impressive innings of 200 in nine hours, the single longest innings in Derbyshire's history.

After the threat of resignation from captain Dominic Cork, it was thought that Rollins was to be made the captain by the board, though this was not to come to fruition, and he was to move to Northamptonshire at the end of 1999. Though he did not have the greatest of starts to his Northamptonshire career, he was still picking up good scores from time to time (most notably missing out on a 'double' at Lord's, where he scored 100 in the first innings and 96 in the second). After spending the 2001 season in Division One, they were to find themselves back down and out again a year later, and, in 2002, with his contract over and a wrist injury caused taking a diving catch at short leg, Northamptonshire did not offer Rollins new terms and he announced his retirement in January 2003.

Since retiring from first-class cricket, Rollins has worked in education in Luton, Northampton, London and Derby. He is currently teaching mathematics in Derby, where he played the majority of his cricket career.

Rollins has a brother who also played first class cricket Robert Rollins.
