= Lloyd Madsen =

South African field hockey player

Lloyd Madsen (born 13 June 1986, Durban, South Africa) is a South African field hockey player. At the 2012 Summer Olympics, he competed for the national team in the tournament. His brother Wayne has also played field hockey for South Africa, and now plays county cricket in England.
