= Vince Clarke (cricketer) =

English cricketer

Personal information
- Full name: Vincent Paul Clarke
- Born: 11 November 1971 (age 55); Liverpool, Lancashire, England
- Batting: Right-handed
- Bowling: Leg-break

Domestic team information
- Years: Team
- 1994: Somerset
- 1995–1996: Leicestershire
- 1997–1998: Derbyshire

Career statistics
Competition	FC	LA
Matches	30	54
Runs scored	1058	648
Batting average	24.60	17.05
100s/50s	0/5	0/3
Top score	99	77*
Balls bowled	2233	1703
Wickets	22	40
Bowling average	65.86	33.72
5 wickets in innings	0	0
10 wickets in match	0	n/a
Best bowling	3/47	4/49
Catches/stumpings	15/–	18/–
- Source: CricketArchive (subscription required), 22 December 2015

Vincent Paul Clarke (born 11 November 1971) is a former English cricketer. He was a right-handed batsman and a right-arm leg-break bowler who played for Somerset, Leicestershire and Derbyshire during a five-year first-class career.

Clarke first played for Somerset during the 1993 Second XI Championship season, making a tenacious debut against Derbyshire batting somewhat down the order. He moved to Leicestershire for a short stint in 1995, and to Derbyshire in 1997. The 1997 season saw Derbyshire finish way down the Championship table, and Clarke was beginning to appear less and less for the first team. He continued to appear for the second team throughout 1998, but only made one appearance in 1999 before hanging up his gloves.

Clarke was a middle-order batsman and an occasional bowler, with a top score of 99. Once renowned for his flippers and googlies, Clarke relied less on his bowling as his career went on. Clarke smashed Wasim Akram for three "4"s in the 1998 Nat West Trophy final at Lords against Lancashire, the third of which was described as "the shot of the innings" by David Gower. Following his career in English county cricket he continued playing cricket in Perth, Australia winning the Cricketer of the Year award for the WA Suburban Turf Cricket Association (WASTCA) in 1996–97, 1998–99 and 2000–2001 while playing for Nollamara Cricket Club. Clarke is married and has three children; his wife is a primary school education assistant.
