= Trevor Smith (cricketer) =

English cricketer

Trevor Mark Smith (born 18 January 1977) is a former English cricketer who played first-class cricket for Derbyshire from 1997 to 2001 and also for Suffolk. He was a left-handed batsman and a right-arm medium-pace bowler.

An instant cricketing hit, he achieved a bowling performance of 8/38 in his second First-class appearance. He finished the 1998 season, with promising bowling average of 23, and performed even better the following year, with an average of only 21.

However, he suffered a bone spur injury soon after he hit peak form, and despite his average declining dramatically, he made his only career half-century in the 2000 season. With good control of line and length, it was a surprise that Derbyshire released him the following year.

He most recently appeared for Suffolk in the 2005 Minor Counties Championship.
