= Thomas Hammond (field hockey) =

South African field hockey player

Medal record

Men's field hockey

Representing South Africa

African Cup of Nations
Gold medal – first place	2017 Ismailia	

Thomas Hammond (born 18 September 1984) is a South African field hockey player who plays for the South African national team. He competed in the 2008 Summer Olympics. He also played in three World Cups.
