= 1993 English cricket season =

The 1993 English cricket season was the 94th in which the County Championship had been an official competition. It included the debut in England of Shane Warne and his "Gatting Ball". Australia, led by Allan Border, won the Ashes series 4–1. Mike Gatting led Middlesex to another Britannic Assurance County Championship.

== Honours ==
- County Championship – Middlesex
- NatWest Trophy – Warwickshire
- Sunday League – Glamorgan
- Benson & Hedges Cup – Derbyshire
- Minor Counties Championship – Staffordshire
- MCCA Knockout Trophy – Staffordshire
- Second XI Championship – Middlesex II
- Wisden – David Boon, Ian Healy, Merv Hughes, Shane Warne, Steve Watkin

== Ashes tour ==
| Cumulative record – Test wins | 1876–1993 |
|---|---|
| England | 89 |
| Australia | 108 |
| Drawn | 83 |

== Zimbabwe tour ==
The Zimbabwe national cricket team made a short tour of England in August and September. They played two limited overs and three first-class matches, mainly against county opposition.

== Annual reviews ==
- Playfair Cricket Annual 1994
- Wisden Cricketers' Almanack 1994
