= John Ward (Derbyshire cricketer) =

English cricketer (born 1948)

John Michael Ward (born 14 September 1948 at Sandon, Staffordshire) is a former English cricketer active from 1970 to 1975 who played for Derbyshire. He appeared in 49 first-class matches as a righthanded batsman, scoring 1,743 runs with a highest score of 104 and held 24 catches.

Ward was educated at Newcastle-under-Lyme School.
