= Keith Goodwin =

English cricketer

Personal information
- Full name: Keith Goodwin
- Born: 25 June 1938; Oldham, Lancashire, England
- Died: 19 August 2003 (aged 65); Portsmouth, Hampshire
- Batting: Right-handed
- Role: Wicketkeeper

Domestic team information
- Years: Team
- 1960–1974: Lancashire

Career statistics
Competition	FC	List A
Matches	124	20
Runs scored	636	29
Batting average	5.78	7.25
100s/50s	–/–	–/–
Top score	23	6*
Catches/stumpings	230/28	25/1
- Source: CricketArchive, 11 October 2024

Keith Goodwin (25 June 1938 – 19 August 2003) was an English cricketer who played for Lancashire from 1960 to 1974. He was born in Oldham and died in Portsmouth. He appeared in 124 first-class matches as a righthanded batsman and wicketkeeper, but was a regular player in the first team for only three seasons, from 1965 to 1967. He scored 636 runs with a highest score of 23 and held 230 catches with 28 stumpings.

In addition to Lancashire, Goodwin appeared in two first-class matches for a Rest of the World XI v Pakistan at Karachi and Lahore in 1973/74.
