= Gary Steer =

English cricketer

Gary Steer (born 17 August 1970) is an English former cricketer who played for Derbyshire in 1993 and 1994 and attended St Edmund Campion Roman Catholic School in Erdington, Birmingham.

Steer first played for Warwickshire's Second XI in 1986, making his debut in June at the age of fifteen years, ten months. He first appeared in the County Championship in 1993 for Derbyshire and looked capable of being a first-team choice for the Peakites, before going back to study in 1994. Finding limited overs cricket difficult upon his return, and conceding to the freer styles of batsmen such as Daffy Defreitas, his bowling become just as overlooked, though when he was given his chance he was shown to possess a superb economy rate. Steer was also the first player to score a 1000 runs in a season for Derbyshire 2nd XI (1993) and in the same season won rapidcricketline player of the month in July.

Steer played in the International Youth Tournament and the Oxbridge Festival finals in 1987 and 1988 respectively, finishing on the winning side both times. He was a right-handed batsman and a right-arm medium-pace bowler, and an occasional wicket-keeper.

Steer now works as the Director of Cricket at *Bedford School.
