= Billy Godleman =

English cricketer (born 1989)

Personal information
- Full name: Billy Ashley Godleman
- Born: 11 February 1989 (age 37); Camden, London, England
- Height: 6 ft 3 in (1.91 m)
- Batting: Left-handed
- Bowling: Right-arm leg break

Domestic team information
- Years: Team
- 2005–2009: Middlesex (squad no. 26)
- 2009–2012: Essex
- 2013–2023: Derbyshire (squad no. 1)
- 2023: → Warwickshire (on loan)
- First-class debut: 1 June 2005 Middlesex v Cambridge UCCE
- List A debut: 22 April 2007 Middlesex v Hampshire

Career statistics
Competition	FC	LA	T20
Matches	188	76	96
Runs scored	10,193	2,827	1,867
Batting average	31.75	42.83	22.49
100s/50s	23/46	7/13	0/12
Top score	227	137	92
Balls bowled	30	–	–
Wickets	0	–	–
Bowling average	–	–	–
5 wickets in innings	–	–	–
10 wickets in match	–	–	–
Best bowling	–	–	–
Catches/stumpings	110/–	24/–	43/–
- Source: ESPNcricinfo, 23 August 2023

Billy Ashley Godleman (born 11 February 1989) is an English first-class cricketer who most recently played for Derbyshire.

He is a left-handed batsman and a right-arm leg-spin bowler who played for Middlesex and Essex before joining Derbyshire in 2013.

He served as the club captain for seven seasons (2016–2022) before he was replaced by Leus du Plooy.

Godleman previously represented the England under-19 team.

== Early life ==
Godleman was raised in Islington where he attended Islington Green School. His father is a London cab driver. During 2004, Godleman was named Bunbury Under-15 player of the year. David English rated him as the best English Under-15 batsman for at least 10 years, and said that he would put money on Godleman playing Test cricket for the England cricket team. Godleman went on to play in England's Under-16 tour to South Africa.

== Early Middlesex career ==
Godleman played for the Middlesex second XI in 2003 (aged 14) and 2004. He made his first-class debut for Middlesex on 1 June 2005, playing against Cambridge UCCE at Fenner's. Also making his first-class debut in the match was Steven Finn (born 4 April 1989). Finn and Godleman became the two youngest first-class debutants for the county, beating the record set by 16-year-old Fred Titmus in June 1949. Godleman did not bat in the first innings, but opened the batting in the second innings, scoring an unbeaten 69. He continued to play for the Middlesex second XI in 2005 and 2006, and also played for Middlesex in four Twenty20 matches in 2006.

He played in three Under-19 Test matches against the Indian side that toured England in 2006, and in five Under-19 ODIs in Malaysia in early 2007.

Godleman played his second first-class match for Middlesex against Oxford UCCE at the Parks in April 2007, scoring 55 after opening both innings. He played his third first-class match in Middlesex's first match of the 2007 County Championship, against Somerset in Taunton. Batting at number 5, he made 113*, sharing a fourth-wicket partnership of 80 with Owais Shah (193) and then an unbroken fifth-wicket partnership of 193 with wicket-keeper David Nash (100*), with the team declaring on 600–4. Somerset responded with a mammoth score of 850–7 declared, including a triple century for Justin Langer, and the match was drawn.

In his next game, Godleman top-scored in the first innings, reaching 77 against Northamptonshire at Lord's. At that point he had passed 50 in all five innings he had played in first-class cricket, but his run came to an end in the second innings when he was lbw to Jason Brown for 40.

== England Under-19s ==
His form dropped slightly as he continued to make 40s and 30s but failed to convert to 50s and larger scores. He was given a chance to regain this lost form when Pakistan U-19 toured England in August 2007. Godleman opened the innings with Alex Wakely and the two shared a relatively slow but prolific opening partnership which ended at 198 when Wakely departed for 112. Godleman fell soon after for 71 but England went on to amass 532 all out. Pakistan U-19 were then bowled out for 214 and 260 resulting in England winning by an innings and 58 runs. The second test saw another good opening partnership of 95 and this time Godleman went on to make a U-19 Test Match century, eventually being caught out on 115. He was out in the second innings however for a duck as Pakistan went on to win the second test by three wickets and level the series at 1–1.

The U-19 One Day International series provided Godleman an opportunity to prove that he could score quickly as well as slowly, as he had batted in the Test series. He made a brisk 32* in the first ODI as rain intervened and the match was abandoned as a no result, he then made a rather slow 29 runs off 43 balls in the low-scoring second match, which saw Pakistan finish a remarkable game chasing 161 by just 1 wicket, having recovered from 99–8.

The third ODI proved another disappointment for Godleman as he once again made it to the high 20s and once again got out. The fourth match proved to be his day, however, as he became the highest U-19 run scorer for England in ODIs, passing names such as Michael Vaughan, Alastair Cook, Nick Knight and Marcus Trescothick. He faced exactly half the balls in the innings (150 balls) and scored 149 not out, as Adam Lyth and himself took England to a massive score of 313–7.

== Move to Essex ==
Having moved to Essex on loan after losing his place in the Middlesex side, Godleman signed a three-year deal with the county in August 2009. Playing in his debut innings in a County Championship match against Hampshire, Billy scored 92 runs off 146 balls before being bowled by Danny Briggs. After a disappointing start to the 2011 season when Billy averaged just 19, he was dropped from the LV County Championship team. On his recall, he made 39 and 130 at Grace Road vs Leicestershire County Cricket Club in July 2011.

At the start of the 2012 season Billy made 130 against Gloucestershire County Cricket Club, but then was dropped from the first XI in May after failing to reach 30 in eight championship innings.

== Derbyshire career ==
At the end of August 2012 Billy was released by Essex, and joined newly promoted first division side Derbyshire, on a two-year contract. In April 2013, he scored what is believed to be the slowest half-century in the history of the County Championship.

Whilst playing for Essex, Godleman played his club cricket for Wivenhoe Town CC and helped coach at Colne Cricket Academy. In 2015 season he crossed 1,000 Championship runs in a season for the first time in his career. He also made centuries in three successive innings as well as impressed with his stand-in captaincy in three games.

In March 2016, he was named captain of Derbyshire County Cricket Club side after Wayne Madsen stepped down.

He was replaced as captain by Leus du Plooy for the 2023 season. Godleman left the club at the end of the 2023 season in which he made three appearances.

Sporting positions
Preceded by Wayne Madsen	Derbyshire County Cricket Club captain 2016-2022	Succeeded by Leus du Plooy
