= Michael May (cricketer) =

English cricketer (born 1971)

Michael Robert May (born 22 July 1971) is a former English cricketer who played for Derbyshire between 1989 and 1999.

He made his debut appearances for Derbyshire at the 1989 Second XI Trophy, but made no contribution with either bat or ball. He appeared steadily in the same competition until 1996, when he began to make an impact in the first team, debuting against a combined team of Indian batsmen and bowlers from around the country. He almost managed to score a half century on debut, turning out the next week for his debut County championship match. He played in the County Championship regularly for two seasons, before making his final appearances as a cricketer in the Second XI trophy in July 1999. He was a right-handed batsman and a right-arm off-break bowler.

He left Derbyshire in 1999 and emigrated to Australia.
