= Gul Khan (cricketer) =

Pakistani cricketer

Personal information
- Full name: Gul Abbass Khan
- Born: 31 December 1973 (age 52); Gujrat, Pakistan
- Batting: Right-handed
- Bowling: Leg spin

Domestic team information
- Years: Team
- 1991–1995: Essex CCC (2nd XI only)
- 1996: Oxford University
- 1996: British Universities
- 1996–1997: Derbyshire CCC

Career statistics
Competition	FC	LA
Matches	16	27
Runs scored	703	559
Batting average	35.15	25.40
100s/50s	1/5	1/1
Top score	101*	147
Balls bowled	174	–
Wickets	3	–
Bowling average	63.33	–
5 wickets in innings	–	–
10 wickets in match	–	–
Best bowling	2/48	–
Catches/stumpings	7/–	7/–
- Source: Cricinfo, 15 April 2021

Gul Abbass Khan (born 31 December 1973) is a Pakistani-born former cricketer. He is a right-handed batsman and leg spin bowler who played for Oxford University and Derbyshire in a two-year first-class career.

== Life ==
Khan was born in Gujrat, Pakistan. Having moved to England, he attended Ipswich School and Swansea University, and then did a one-year postgraduate course at Keble College, Oxford.

Khan played second XI cricket for Essex from 1991 to 1995. He played first-class and List A cricket for Oxford University and British Universities during the early part of the 1996 season and, according to Wisden Cricketers' Almanack, made a significant impact. "Gul Khan... revealed himself as a natural strokeplayer, and his arrival injected much adventure into the middle order. After several near-misses, he fashioned a maiden first-class century against Kent at Canterbury, which followed a brilliant 147 for the British Universities against Glamorgan in the Benson and Hedges Cup." He was awarded his Blue by appearing in the 1996 University Match against Cambridge University. At the end of the university season in mid-summer, he joined Derbyshire. During two seasons at Derbyshire, Khan played four County Championship matches and 22 List A matches.
