= Richard Sladdin =

English cricketer

Personal information
- Full name: Richard William Sladdin
- Born: 8 January 1969 (age 57); Halifax, Yorkshire, England
- Batting: Right-handed
- Bowling: Slow left-arm orthodox

Domestic team information
- Years: Team
- 1991–1994: Derbyshire
- 1997: Somerset

Career statistics
Competition	FC	LA
Matches	34	11
Runs scored	372	24
Batting average	11.27	24.00
100s/50s	0/1	0/0
Top score	51*	16
Balls bowled	8090	456
Wickets	99	8
Bowling average	39.49	47.25
5 wickets in innings	3	0
10 wickets in match	0	n/a
Best bowling	6/58	2/26
Catches/stumpings	15/–	3/–
- Source: CricketArchive, 22 December 2015

Richard William Sladdin (born 8 January 1969) is an English former cricketer who played for Derbyshire from 1991 to 1994 and for Somerset in 1997. He was born in Halifax, Yorkshire.

In 2017, Sladdin was convicted of the sexual grooming of a fourteen year old girl and sentenced to one year in prison.

The most important spinner within the Derbyshire lineup in the early part of the 1990s, he debuted in a draw against Yorkshire in July 1991, as Derbyshire finished in third position in the season's table. A common fixture until the middle of the 1994 season, his career was quickly over, as he hit zero wickets for 190 runs, the single worst bowling figures in the history of Derbyshire County Cricket Club.

Prior to the end of his career, he played briefly in the 1997 season, for Somerset, though his career finished there. He was a right-handed batsman and a left-arm slow bowler. He hit five wickets in an inning twice in his career, including once in his sole first-class game for Somerset.

== Child sexual abuse conviction ==
Sladdin used an internet dating site to arrange a meeting with someone he thought was a girl of 14 called 'Claire'. But he was unmasked when he turned up at a car park 30 miles from home with a packet of crisps, an alcoholic drink and a box of condoms - only to be confronted by a man who showed him his incriminating messages.

Self-proclaimed paedophile hunters filmed the encounter in Leigh, Greater Manchester, on a mobile and the video went viral with more than two million views. He was jailed for 12 months at Bolton Crown Court after he pleaded guilty to sexual grooming and attempting to meet a girl under the age of 16.
