= Matthew Vandrau =

English-born South African cricketer (born 1969)

Cricket information
- Batting: Right-handed
- Bowling: Right-arm off break

Career statistics
Competition	First-class	List A
Matches	59	44
Runs scored	1,567	266
Batting average	20.61	19.00
100s/50s	0/5	0/0
Top score	66	32*
Balls bowled	8,420	1,497
Wickets	132	32
Bowling average	33.63	40.25
5 wickets in innings	7	0
10 wickets in match	2	0
Best bowling	6/34	3/25
Catches/stumpings	29/–	13/–
- Source: CricketArchive, 7 November 2022

Matthew James Vandrau (born 22 July 1969) is a retired English-born South African-raised cricketer and businessman. Having moved to South Africa at an early age, he first appeared in first-class cricket playing for Transvaal in 1990. He moved to England in 1993 to play for Derbyshire in two stints between 1993 and 1997.

These were separated by Transvaal's entry into the UCB Bowl, a competition in which Vandrau participated yearly between 1994, when his Transvaal team shared the trophy with Western Province after a draw, despite Vandrau's absence from the team, and 1995, when they did not progress beyond the group stage.

He continued to play first-class cricket until 1997, at which point he was not offered a new contract.

Now Vandrau is based in London with his family.
