= Karl Krikken =

English cricketer

Personal information
- Full name: Karl Matthew Krikken
- Born: 9 April 1969 (age 57); Farnworth, Lancashire
- Batting: Right-handed
- Role: Wicket-keeper
- Relatives: Brian Krikken (father)

Domestic team information
- Years: Team
- 1987–2003: Derbyshire
- 1988/89: Griqualand West
- FC debut: 3 February 1989 Griqualand West v Eastern Province B
- Last FC: 15 July 2003 Derbyshire v Worcestershire
- LA debut: 10 May 1987 Derbyshire v Sussex
- Last LA: 13 July 2003 Derbyshire v Sussex

Career statistics
Competition	FC	LA	T20
Matches	214	203	1
Runs scored	5,725	1,671	3
Batting average	21.76	18.77	–
100s/50s	1/25	0/1	0/0
Top score	104	55	3*
Balls bowled	134	–	–
Wickets	1	–	–
Bowling average	121	–	–
5 wickets in innings	0	–	–
10 wickets in match	0	–	–
Best bowling	1/54	–	–
Catches/stumpings	526/31	196/44	1/0
- Source: CricketArchive, 30 June 2016

Karl Matthew Krikken (born 9 April 1969) is a former English cricketer who played for Derbyshire County Cricket Club, primarily as a wicket-keeper, between 1987 and 2003.

Krikken was born in Farnworth, Lancashire, the son of Brian Krikken, a wicket-keeper with Lancashire and Worcestershire between 1966 and 1969. Krikken joined Derbyshire in the 1987 season and was the club's first-choice wicket-keeper for most of his career after displacing Bernie Maher in the side. He was also a lower-order right-handed batsman.

A highlight of his career was winning the 1993 Benson & Hedges Cup with Derbyshire. Krikken shared an unbeaten 77-run partnership with man of the match Dominic Cork in the narrow victory over Lancashire in the final, scoring 37 not out.

After his retirement, he became Derbyshire's Academy Coach in late 2003, having earned the ECB's Level 4 Coaching Certificate. Krikken was appointed as the club's Head Coach in June 2011.
