= List of Derbyshire County Cricket Club seasons =

This is a list of seasons played by Derbyshire County Cricket Club in English cricket, from the club's formation in 1870.

== Early years 1871–1887 ==
Derbyshire played their first matches in 1871. For the first three years their only opponents were Lancashire. When Kent joined in 1874, by a quirk of scoring which was based on games lost, they were County Champion. The club was bedevilled by financial problems, and in 1888 the sporting press decided no longer to accord them first-class status.

Season	Pld	W	L	D	Captain	Most runs	Most wickets	Wicket keeper
1871	2	1	1	0	Samuel Richardson	Unwin Sowter	Dove Gregory	Samuel Richardson
1872	2	0	2	0	Samuel Richardson	Thomas Attenborough	Dove Gregory	Samuel Richardson
1873	2	0	0	2	Samuel Richardson	William Curgenven	William Mycroft	Samuel Richardson
1874	4	3	0	1	Samuel Richardson	George Frost	William Mycroft	Samuel Richardson
1875	7	2	4	1	Samuel Richardson	Thomas Foster	William Mycroft	Alfort Smith
1876	7	3	4	0	Robert Smith	John Platts	William Mycroft	Alfort Smith
1877	9	5	3	1	Robert Smith	John Platts	William Mycroft	Alfort Smith; Thomas Mycroft
1878	12	3	8	1	Robert Smith	Robert Smith	William Mycroft	Alfort Smith
1879	7	2	5	0	Robert Smith	Thomas Foster	William Mycroft	Alfort Smith
1880	10	2	7	1	Robert Smith	Thomas Foster	William Mycroft	Alfort Smith
1881	9	2	6	1	Robert Smith	Ludford Docker	William Mycroft	James Disney
1882	8	1	7	0	Robert Smith	Thomas Foster	William Mycroft	James Disney
1883	10	2	6	2	Robert Smith	Wallis Evershed	William Cropper; James Brelsford	James Disney
1884	12	1	11	0	Ludford Docker	Frank Sugg	William Cropper; Joseph Marlow	Thomas Mycroft
1885	11	3	6	2	Edmund Maynard	Frank Sugg	William Cropper; Frank Shacklock	James Disney
1886	11	1	9	1	Edmund Maynard	William Chatterton	William Cropper "GG" Walker	James Disney
1887	7	0	7	0	William Chatterton	George Davidson	George Davidson	James Disney

== Wilderness years 1888–1893 ==
From 1888, Derbyshire's matches were not accorded first-class status. However the club continued to play first-class counties and most of the players carried on with the club. In 1891, the County Championship was established and four years later Derbyshire were invited to join.

Season	Pld	W	L	D	Captain	Most runs	Most wickets	Wicket keeper
1888	12	3	9	0	William Chatterton	William Chatterton	John Hulme	James Disney
1889	11	3	5	3	William Chatterton	William Chatterton	George Davidson	James Disney
1890	14	7	5	2	Fred Spofforth	Levi Wright	George Davidson	No regular keeper
1891	13	6	4	3	Sydney Evershed	William Chatterton	George Davidson	William Storer
1892	13	5	7	1	Sydney Evershed	Harry Bagshaw	George Davidson	William Storer
1893	16	7	6	3	Sydney Evershed	Harry Bagshaw	George Davidson	William Storer

== First-class and County Championships 1894–1962 ==
In 1894 Derbyshire's matches were accorded first-class status. However the club did not compete in the County Championship until the following year when it sealed its place by coming 5th.

Season	Pld	W	L	D	CC pos	Captain	Most runs	Most wickets	Wicket keeper
1894	11	6	4	1	X	Sydney Evershed	George Davidson	George Davidson	William Storer
1895	17	6	4	7	5	Sydney Evershed	William Chatterton	George Davidson	William Storer
1896	17	4	6	7	7	Sydney Evershed	William Storer	John Hulme	William Storer
1897	17	0	10	7	14	Sydney Evershed	Levi Wright	George Davidson	William Storer
1898	17	3	6	8	9	Sydney Evershed	William Storer	George Davidson	William Storer
1899	20	3	10	7	15	Samuel Hill Wood	Levi Wright	John Hulme	William Storer
1900	21	3	8	10	13	Samuel Hill Wood	William Storer	John Hulme	William Storer
1901	24	0	16	8	15	Samuel Hill Wood	Levi Wright	Billy Bestwick	William Storer
1902	20	5	8	7	10	Albert Lawton	Maynard Ashcroft	Billy Bestwick	Joe Humphries
1903	19	5	9	5	12	Albert Lawton	Levi Wright	Billy Bestwick	Joe Humphries
1904	22	7	9	6	10	Maynard Ashcroft	Charles Ollivierre	Arnold Warren	Joe Humphries
1905	22	3	16	3	14	Albert Lawton	Levi Wright	Billy Bestwick	Joe Humphries
1906	22	3	18	1	16	Levi Wright	Levi Wright	Billy Bestwick	Joe Humphries
1907	24	2	19	3	16	Levi Wright	Levi Wright	Samuel Cadman	Joe Humphries
1908	23	5	14	4	14	Reginald Rickman	Ernest Needham	Billy Bestwick	Joe Humphries
1909	23	2	16	5	15	Reginald Rickman	Samuel Cadman	Arnold Warren	Joe Humphries
1910	22	2	14	6	15	John Chapman	Ernest Needham	Arthur Morton	Joe Humphries
1911	18	2	13	3	14	John Chapman	Samuel Cadman	Arnold Warren	Joe Humphries
1912	20	2	8	10	12	John Chapman	Samuel Cadman	Arthur Morton	Joe Humphries
1913	18	4	10	4	13	Richard Baggallay	Leonard Oliver	Thomas Forrester	Joe Humphries
1914	20	5	12	3	12	Richard Baggallay	Arthur Morton	Tom Forrester	Joe Humphries
1919	15	4	9	2	9	Richard Baggallay	Leonard Oliver	Billy Bestwick	George Beet
1920	18	0	17	1	16	John Chapman	Leonard Oliver	Arthur Morton	George Beet; Harry Elliott
1921	20	5	12	3	12	George Buckston	Samuel Cadman	Billy Bestwick	Harry Elliott
1922	22	6	10	6	11	Guy Jackson	Samuel Cadman	Arthur Morton	Harry Elliott
1923	23	4	7	12	10	Guy Jackson	Wilfred Hill-Wood	Billy Bestwick	Harry Elliott
1924	25	0	14	11	17	Guy Jackson	Guy Jackson	Billy Bestwick	Harry Elliott
1925	24	5	12	7	14	Guy Jackson	Garnet Lee	Arthur Morton	Harry Elliott
1926	25	5	7	13	11	Guy Jackson	Harry Storer	Stan Worthington	Harry Elliott
1927	25	8	4	13	5	Guy Jackson	Archibald Slater	Garnet Lee	Harry Elliott
1928	29	6	8	15	10	Guy Jackson	Harry Storer	Leslie Townsend	Harry Elliott
1929	30	11	6	13	7	Guy Jackson	Harry Storer	Tommy Mitchell	Harry Elliott
1930	29	7	9	13	9	Guy Jackson	Harry Storer	Tommy Mitchell	Harry Elliott
1931	29	7	6	16	7	Arthur Richardson	Denis Smith	Archibald Slater	Harry Elliott
1932	29	7	8	14	10	Arthur Richardson	Denis Smith	Tommy Mitchell	Harry Elliott
1933	29	11	11	7	6	Arthur Richardson	Leslie Townsend	Tommy Mitchell	Harry Elliott
1934	29	12	7	10	3	Arthur Richardson	Denis Smith	Tommy Mitchell	Harry Elliott
1935	29	16	7	6	2	Arthur Richardson	Denis Smith	Tommy Mitchell	Harry Elliott
1936	30	15	4	11	1	Arthur Richardson	Stan Worthington; Leslie Townsend	Bill Copson	Harry Elliott
1937	29	15	6	8	3	Robin Buckston	Denis Smith	Tommy Mitchell	Harry Elliott
1938	29	11	6	12	5	Robin Buckston	Stan Worthington	Tommy Mitchell	Harry Elliott
1939	30	11	7	12	9	Robin Buckston	Denis Smith	Bill Copson	Harry Elliott
1946	27	5	13	9	15	Gilbert Hodgkinson	Denis Smith	Cliff Gladwin	Denis Smith
1947	28	12	10	6	5	Edward Gothard	Charlie Elliott	Cliff Gladwin	Denis Smith
1948	27	11	7	9	6	Edward Gothard	Charlie Elliott	Cliff Gladwin	George Dawkes
1949	27	6	14	7	15	David Skinner	Charlie Elliott	Cliff Gladwin	George Dawkes
1950	30	8	9	13	5	Pat Vaulkhard	Alan Revill	Dusty Rhodes	George Dawkes
1951	29	5	7	17	11	Guy Willatt	Charlie Elliott	Cliff Gladwin	George Dawkes
1952	29	11	8	10	4	Guy Willatt	Charlie Elliott	Cliff Gladwin	George Dawkes
1953	30	9	7	14	6	Guy Willatt	Arnold Hamer	Cliff Gladwin	George Dawkes
1954	30	12	6	12	3	Guy Willatt	Arnold Hamer	Cliff Gladwin	George Dawkes
1955	30	10	10	10	8	Donald Carr	Arnold Hamer	Cliff Gladwin	George Dawkes
1956	30	7	7	16	12	Donald Carr	Charles Lee	Les Jackson	George Dawkes
1957	30	11	9	10	4	Donald Carr	Arnold Hamer	Les Jackson	George Dawkes
1958	30	10	9	11	5	Donald Carr	Charles Lee	Les Jackson	George Dawkes
1959	30	13	6	11	7	Donald Carr	Donald Carr	Les Jackson	George Dawkes
1960	31	10	10	11	5	Donald Carr	Laurie Johnson	Les Jackson	George Dawkes
1961	31	10	9	12	7	Donald Carr	Laurie Johnson	Harold Rhodes	George Dawkes; Bob Taylor
1962	30	9	6	15	7	Donald Carr	Laurie Johnson	Les Jackson	Bob Taylor

== New competitions 1963–1998 ==
In the 1960s, to revitalise the game, various competitions were introduced and Derbyshire participated in these. The Gillette Cup – later The National Westminster Bank Trophy – began in 1963 as a knock-out (KO) competition, The John Player League – later the National League began in 1969 as a one-day competition. The Benson & Hedges Cup competition began in 1972 as a limited overs (LO) knock-out competition with preliminary groups.

Season	First-class				CC pos	One Day League					KO	LO	Captain	Most runs	Most wickets	Wicket keeper
Season	P	W	L	D	CC pos	P	W	L	NR	NL pos	KO	LO	Captain	Most runs	Most wickets	Wicket keeper
1963	31	3	15	13	17						QF		Charles Lee	Charles Lee	Harold Rhodes	Bob Taylor
1964	30	5	9	16	12						R1		Charles Lee	Derek Morgan	Brian Jackson	Bob Taylor
1965	30	9	9	12	9						R2		Derek Morgan	Ian Hall	Brian Jackson	Bob Taylor
1966	30	9	13	8	9						R2		Derek Morgan	John Harvey	Harold Rhodes	Bob Taylor
1967	30	6	6	18	6						R2		Derek Morgan	David Smith	Harold Rhodes	Bob Taylor
1968	30	6	6	18	8						R2		Derek Morgan	David Smith	Harold Rhodes	Bob Taylor
1969	26	3	5	18	16	16	5	10	1	15	RU		Derek Morgan	Peter Gibbs	Harold Rhodes	Bob Taylor
1970	25	7	7	11	7	16	11	5	0	3	R2		Ian Buxton			
1971	26	1	6	19	17	16	7	8	1	11	R2		Ian Buxton	Ian Hall	Philip Russell	Bob Taylor
1972	22	2	5	15	17	16	7	7	2	9	R2	Grp	Ian Buxton			
1973	23	3	11	8	16	16	5	8	3	12	R2	Grp	Brian Bolus	Brian Bolus	Venkat	Bob Taylor
1974	22	2	7	13	17	16	4	11	1	15	R1	Grp	Brian Bolus			
1975	23	7	8	8	15	16	7	8	1	9	SF	Grp	Bob Taylor			
1976	23	6	8	9	15	16	7	9	–	12	QF	Grp	Bob Taylor	Eddie Barlow	Geoff Miller	Bob Taylor
1977	23	7	3	13	7	16	6	8	2	9	QF	Grp	Eddie Barlow			
1978	24	3	7	14	14	16	6	7	3	8	R2	RU	Eddie Barlow	Alan Hill	Eddie Barlow	Bob Taylor
1979	24	1	6	17	16	16	4	9	3	16	R2	SF	Geoff Miller			
1980	23	4	4	15	9	16	8	7	1	6	R2	Grp	Geoff Miller			
1981	23	4	7	12	12	16	10	5	1	4	W	Grp	Geoff Miller	Peter Kirsten	Paul Newman	Bob Taylor
1982	23	4	4	15	11	16	6	9	1	12	R2	QF	Barry Wood			
1983	24	7	5	12	9	16	7	5	4	6	R2	Grp	Barry Wood	Kim Barnett	Ole Mortensen	Bob Taylor
1984	25	4	7	14	12	16	4	11	1	17	R2	Grp	Kim Barnett			
1985	25	3	9	13	13	16	8	5	3	4	R1	SF	Kim Barnett			
1986	25	5	5	15	11	16	7	9	0	9	R2	QF	Kim Barnett	John Morris	Michael Holding	Chris Marples
1987	25	7	5	13	6	16	8	4	4	5	QF	Grp	Kim Barnett			
1988	24	5	3	15	15	16	5	8	3	12	QF	RU	Kim Barnett	Kim Barnett	Michael Holding	Bernie Maher
1989	24	6	7	11	6	16	9	6	1	5	R2	Grp	Kim Barnett			
1990	24	7	8	9	12	16	12	3	1	1	R2	Grp	Kim Barnett	Kim Barnett	Ian Bishop	Karl Krikken
1991	25	9	5	11	3	16	5	11	0	15	R1	Grp	Kim Barnett			
1992	24	7	6	11	5	17	7	9	1	13	R2	Grp	Kim Barnett			
1993	19	4	7	8	15	17	7	8	2	11	R2	W	Kim Barnett	John Morris	Devon Malcolm	Karl Krikken
1994	18	5	9	4	17	17	8	7	2	8	QF	QF	Kim Barnett			
1995	19	5	11	3	14	17	7	6	4	8	QF	Grp	Kim Barnett			
1996	20	10	3	7	2	17	7	7	3	11	QF	Grp	Dean Jones			
1997	20	5	9	6	16	17	4	9	4	14	QF	Grp	Dean Jones	Kim Barnett	Devon Malcolm	Karl Krikken
1998	19	6	7	6	10	17	6	8	3	15	RU	Grp	Dominic Cork			

== Divisions 1999–2009 ==
In 1999, the National League was split into two divisions, followed by the County Championship in 2000. The National Westminster Bank Trophy became the Cheltenham and Gloucester Trophy and then the Friends Provident Trophy. The league had various appellations until it became the National League. The Benson & Hedges Competition was dropped in 2002 and the Twenty20 competition substituted in 2003.

Season	First-class				CC pos	One Day League					KO	LO	Captain	Most runs	Most wickets	Wicket keeper
Season	P	W	L	D	CC pos	P	W	L	NR	NL pos	KO	LO	Captain	Most runs	Most wickets	Wicket keeper
1999	17	7	8	2	9	16	4	10	2	2/8	R4		Dominic Cork			
2000	18	2	7	9	1/9	16	2	13	1	2/9	R4	Grp	Dominic Cork			
2001	17	1	9	7	2/9	16	4	12	0	2/9	R3	Grp	Dominic Cork			
2002	18	8	7	3	2/6	16	8	7	1	2/4	R3	Grp	Dominic Cork		Kevin Dean	
2003	17	2	11	4	2/9	18	8	8	2	2/6	SF	Grp	Dominic Cork	Michael Di Venuto	Graeme Welch	Luke Sutton
2004	18	2	7	9	2/8	18	5	12	1	2/9	R2	Grp	Luke Sutton	Hassan Adnan	Graeme Welch	Luke Sutton
2005	17	1	8	8	2/9	18	9	7	2	2/5	R2	QF	Luke Sutton	Michael di Venuto	Graeme Welch	Luke Sutton
2006	18	4	5	9	2/5	8	1	6	1	2/8	N5	Grp	Graeme Welch	Michael Di Venuto	Steffan Jones	James Pipe
2007	17	3	5	9	2/6	8	1	7	0	2/8	N8	Grp	Simon Katich	Simon Katich	Tom Lungley	James Pipe
2008	18	4	4	10	2/6	8	1	6	1	2/8	Grp	Grp	Rikki Clarke	Chris Rogers	Graham Wagg	James Pipe
2009	16	2	3	11	2/6	8	2	4	2	2/8	Grp	Grp	Chris Rogers	Chris Rogers	Tim Groenewald	James Pipe

== Three competitions 2010 onwards ==
Two new competitions were introduced for the 2010 cricket season. These were the Clydesdale Bank 40 and the Friends Provident t20. These replaced the Pro40 League, the Friends Provident Trophy and the Twenty20 competitions.

Season	First-class				CC pos	One Day League					T20	Captain	Most runs	Most wickets	Wicket keeper
Season	P	W	L	D	CC pos	P	W	L	NR	NL pos	T20	Captain	Most runs	Most wickets	Wicket keeper
2010	17	3	7	7	2/9	12	4	8	0	2/4	Grp	Greg Smith	Chris Rogers	Robin Peterson	Stephen Adshead; Lee Goddard
2011	16	5	6	5	2/5	16	6	5	1	2/3	Grp	Luke Sutton	Wes Durston	Tim Groenewald	Luke Sutton

== Key ==
Winners	Runners up

Key to league record:
P – games played
W – games won
L – games lost
D – games drawn, abandoned or tied
NR – games with no result
Pos – final position

Key to rounds:
R1 – first round
R2 – second round, etc.
QF – quarter-final
SF – semi-final
Grp – group stage
RU – runners-up

== See also ==
- Durham County Cricket Club seasons
- Kent County Cricket Club seasons
- Northamptonshire County Cricket Club seasons
- Somerset County Cricket Club seasons
