= Derbyshire County Cricket Club in 1923 =

1923 season of an English cricket team

Derbyshire County Cricket Club seasons
1923 season
- Captain: Guy Jackson
- County Championship: 10
- Most runs: Wilfred Hill-Wood
- Most wickets: Billy Bestwick
- Most catches: Harry Elliott

Derbyshire County Cricket Club in 1923 was the cricket season when the English club Derbyshire had been playing for fifty-two years. It was their twenty-fifth season in the County Championship and they won four matches to finish tenth.

== 1923 season ==
Derbyshire played twenty two games in the County Championship and one against the touring West Indies. They won four games altogether and finished tenth in the Championship table.

Guy Jackson was in his second year as captain. Wilfred Hill-Wood was top scorer and Billy Bestwick took most wickets.

New players in the season were James Cresswell who played 21 matches over four seasons, and Richard Pratt who played five matches in two seasons.

=== Matches ===
List of matches
No.	Date	V	Result	Margin	Notes
1	12 May 1923	Nottinghamshire; Trent Bridge, Nottingham	Drawn		Gunn 220; Richmond 5-101; W Bestwick 5-53
2	19 May 1923	Warwickshire; Edgbaston, Birmingham	Won	4 wickets	J Horsley 7-48; Partridge 7-66; Howell 5-68
3	23 May 1923	Worcestershire; Tipton Road, Dudley	Drawn		
4	26 May 1923	Essex; Queen's Park, Chesterfield	Drawn		A Morton 7-48
5	30 May 1923	Yorkshire; County Ground, Derby	Lost	Innings and 126 runs	Kilner 5-32
6	06 Jun 1923	Gloucestershire; Fry's Ground, Bristol	Lost	Innings and 72 runs	Mills 6-72
7	09 Jun 1923	Glamorgan; Cardiff Arms Park	Drawn		GR Jackson 102; W Bestwick 7-39 and 5-55
8	13 Jun 1923	Somerset; Recreation Ground, Bath	Drawn		Lyon 134; WWH Hill-Wood 107; J Bowden 114; Bridges 5-117
9	16 Jun 1923	Leicestershire; Bath Grounds, Ashby-de-la-Zouch	Won	62 runs	Geary 6-70; W Bestwick 7-61 and 6-37
10	20 Jun 1923	West Indies; Park Road Ground, Buxton	Drawn		SWA Cadman 5-41
11	23 Jun 1923	Lancashire; County Ground, Derby	Drawn		W Bestwick 6-60
12	30 Jun 1923	Northamptonshire; Queen's Park, Chesterfield	Won	Innings and 211 runs	W Carter 100*; W Bestwick 5-45; J Horsley 6-29
13	04 Jul 1923	Essex; County Ground, Leyton	Drawn		Douglas 110; A Morton 100
14	07 Jul 1923	Gloucestershire; The Town Ground, Burton-on-Trent	Lost	8 wickets	Parker 7-37 and 5-76; Dennett 5-93
15	14 Jul 1923	Somerset; Queen's Park, Chesterfield	Lost	61 runs	J Horsley 5-40 and 5-45; White 5-35
16	21 Jul 1923	Northamptonshire; County Ground, Northampton	Lost	1 wicket	W Bestwick 5-61
17	25 Jul 1923	Glamorgan; Queen's Park, Chesterfield	Won	5 wickets	J Horsley 5-58
18	28 Jul 1923	Worcestershire; County Ground, Derby	Drawn		
19	04 Aug 1923	Warwickshire; County Ground, Derby	Drawn		GR Jackson 109; WWH Hill-Wood 5-62
20	11 Aug 1923	Yorkshire; Park Avenue Cricket Ground, Bradford	Lost	8 wickets	Rhodes 7-60; J Horsley 5-69
21	18 Aug 1923	Nottinghamshire; Queen's Park, Chesterfield	Drawn		Staples 5-101
22	22 Aug 1923	Leicestershire; County Ground, Derby	Drawn		J Horsley 6-49
23	25 Aug 1923	Lancashire; Old Trafford, Manchester	Lost	Innings and 32 runs	Parkin 6-68 and 5-12; A Morton 6-45; Ellis 5-21

== Statistics ==
=== County Championship batting averages ===
Name	Matches	Inns	Runs	High score	Average	100s
WWH Hill-Wood	17	28	961	107	34.32	1
W Carter	18	29	710	100*	27.30	1
GR Jackson	21	35	893	109*	27.06	2
A Morton	15	22	491	100	24.55	1
H Storer	21	35	760	94	21.71	0
J Bowden	18	30	612	114	21.10	1
SWA Cadman	19	33	611	88	19.70	0
JM Hutchinson	22	35	550	63	17.74	0
BSH Hill-Wood	11	18	237	49	14.81	0
J Horsley	17	22	183	33	12.20	0
H Elliott	22	32	279	26	12.13	0
L F Townsend	11	18	178	44	11.86	0
W Bestwick	18	24	88	19	5.86	0
R Pratt	2	4	22	13	5.50	0
AHM Jackson	6	9	34	12	4.25	0
JA Cresswell	1	1	3	3	3.00	0
L Oliver	1	2	5	4	2.50	0
WJV Tomlinson	1	2	4	4	2.00	0
ST McMillan	1	2	0	0	0.00	0

=== County Championship bowling averages ===
Name	Balls	Runs	Wickets	BB	Average
W Bestwick	3938	1482	91	7-39	16.28
J Horsley	2706	1019	63	7-48	16.17
A Morton	1990	782	34	7-48	23.00
WWH Hill-Wood	1496	787	30	5-62	26.23
SWA Cadman	1878	561	29	3-10	19.34
BSH Hill-Wood	1335	630	22	4-36	28.63
H Storer	1098	501	18	3-19	27.83
AHM Jackson	210	156	5	2-58	31.20
W Carter	186	124	5	3-12	24.80
L F Townsend	342	161	3	2-43	53.66
JA Cresswell	84	32	2	2-32	16.00
JM Hutchinson	150	73	2	1-21	36.50
GR Jackson	24	13	0		
WJV Tomlinson	24	16	0		
J Bowden	18	15	0		

=== Wicket Keeper ===
- H Elliott - Catches 25, Stumping 7

== See also ==
- Derbyshire County Cricket Club seasons
- 1923 English cricket season
