= Derbyshire County Cricket Club in 1925 =

1925 season of an English cricket team

Derbyshire County Cricket Club seasons
1925 season
- Captain: Guy Jackson
- County Championship: 14
- Most runs: Garnet Lee
- Most wickets: Arthur Morton
- Most catches: Harry Elliott

Derbyshire County Cricket Club in 1925 was the cricket season when the English club Derbyshire had been playing for fifty four years. It was their twenty seventh season in the County Championship and they won five matches to finish fourteenth in the County Championship.

== 1925 season ==
Guy Jackson was in his fourth season as captain. All the club's twenty-four first class matches were in the County Championship. The team recovered from a poor season in the previous year with five wins, but with fewer draws the high number of losses left the team in fourteenth place. Garnet Lee was top scorer in his first season as a first-class player for Derbyshire. Arthur Morton took most wickets with 63.

The most significant addition to the side was Garnet Lee who was to prove a valuable all-rounder over the next few years. Lee had previously played for Nottinghamshire but had taken two seasons at Derbyshire to work himself into the first team. Other players making their debut were Lionel Blaxland who played intermittently over several years Escott Loney and Wilfred Shardlow who played regularly for three seasons, and Eric Sykes who played three games in the season and re-appeared in 1932.

=== Matches ===
List of matches
No.	Date	V	Result	Margin	Notes
1	9 May 1925	Northamptonshire; County Ground, Derby	Lost	35 runs	
2	16 May 1925	Nottinghamshire; Trent Bridge, Nottingham	Lost	10 wickets	
3	20 May 1925	Yorkshire; Queen's Park, Chesterfield	Lost	Innings and 160 runs	Holmes 125; Macaulay 7-13
4	23 May 1925	Somerset; County Ground, Derby	Drawn		W Bestwick 5-22
5	30 May 1925	Warwickshire; Edgbaston, Birmingham	Drawn		Stephens 121; GM Lee 119
6	3 Jun 1925	Worcestershire; Amblecote, Stourbridge	Won	212 runs	Rogers 6-69; Root 5-54
7	6 Jun 1925	Gloucestershire; Queen's Park, Chesterfield	Lost	3 wickets	Hammond 5-57; J Horsley 6-94; Parker 8-56
8	10 Jun 1925	Essex; County Ground, Leyton	Won	9 wickets	A Morton 131; BSH Hill-Wood 6-74; J Horsley 6-66
9	13 Jun 1925	Kent; Angel Ground, Tonbridge	Lost	Innings and 32 runs	Seymour 106; Collins 105*; GR Jackson 127; Freeman 6-35 and 5-94
10	20 Jun 1925	Worcestershire; Queen's Park, Chesterfield	Won	6 wickets	Root 5-92
11	27 Jun 1925	Kent; County Ground, Derby	Lost	5 wickets	Hardinge 144; Seymour 119; Cornwallis 5-56; J Horsley 5-36
12	1 Jul 1925	Yorkshire; Headingley, Leeds	Lost	Innings and 159 runs	Rhodes 157;
13	4 Jul 1925	Leicestershire; The Town Ground, Burton-on-Trent	Drawn		GR Jackson 110; Skelding 5-54; W Bestwick 7-20
14	11 Jul 1925	Leicestershire; Aylestone Road, Leicester	Lost	248 runs	Skelding 5-40; Astill 5-19
15	15 Jul 1925	Glamorgan; Cardiff Arms Park	Lost	200 runs	Ryan 5-19 and 8-41
16	18 Jul 1925	Somerset; Clarence Park, Weston-super-Mare	Won	3 wickets	GM Lee 113; GR Jackson 105
17	22 Jul 1925	Gloucestershire; Fry's Ground, Bristol	Lost	Innings and 32 runs	Parker 5-19 and 6-61
18	25 Jul 1925	Nottinghamshire; Rutland Recreation Ground, Ilkeston	Drawn		Whysall 140
19	29 Jul 1925	Essex; County Ground, Derby	Drawn		Hipkin 5-44
20	1 Aug 1925	Warwickshire; County Ground, Derby	Drawn		
21	5 Aug 1925	Northamptonshire; County Ground, Northampton	Drawn		A Morton 5-89
22	12 Aug 1925	Glamorgan; Queen's Park, Chesterfield	Won	6 wickets	Ryan 7-70
23	15 Aug 1925	Lancashire; Seed Hill Ground, Nelson	Lost	97 runs	A Morton 7-51
24	22 Aug 1925	Lancashire; Queen's Park, Chesterfield	Lost	Innings and 132 runs	R Tyldesley 8-40; Sibbles 5-30

== Statistics ==
=== County Championship batting averages ===
Name	Matches	Inns	Runs	High score	Average	100s
GR Jackson	23	42	1199	127	29.97	3
GM Lee	24	46	1238	119	28.13	2
JL Crommelin-Brown	4	7	144	68	24.00	0
J Bowden	23	43	742	62	19.02	0
L F Townsend	24	45	808	59	18.79	0
A Morton	18	27	433	131	17.32	1
BSH Hill-Wood	6	11	187	61	17.00	0
WWH Hill-Wood	5	10	167	35	16.70	0
H Storer	2	3	31	23	15.50	0
J Horsley	17	28	365	47*	15.20	0
G Beet	1	2	30	17	15.00	0
JM Hutchinson	24	41	543	79	14.67	0
SWA Cadman	23	40	513	60	14.65	0
E Sykes	3	6	65	50	13.00	0
FR Heath	1	2	13	13*	13.00	0
H Elliott	24	38	228	33	11.40	0
EF Loney	6	9	89	36	11.12	0
T S Worthington	3	6	49	20	9.80	0
LB Blaxland	3	4	39	25	9.75	0
AHM Jackson	5	7	63	17	9.00	0
W Shardlow	3	3	18	11	9.00	0
JA Cresswell	5	10	28	9	4.66	0
W Bestwick	7	10	26	7*	3.25	0
FG Peach	1	2	6	5	3.00	0
A Ackroyd	7	12	32	9	2.66	0
JS Heath	2	4	10	8	2.50	0

All Derbyshire's first class matches were in the County Championship, and so the above table represents first-class statistics as well.

=== County Championship bowling averages ===
Name	Balls	Runs	Wickets	BB	Average
A Morton	3597	1262	63	7–51	20.03
J Horsley	3158	1235	54	6–66	22.87
GM Lee	2408	1084	44	4–36	24.63
SWA Cadman	3517	1043	40	4–29	26.07
W Bestwick	1561	525	35	7–20	15.00
L F Townsend	2075	778	28	4–57	27.78
BSH Hill-Wood	972	573	18	6–74	31.83
A Ackroyd	835	390	11	4–63	35.45
H Storer	546	157	10	4–31	15.70
JA Cresswell	624	323	9	4–65	35.88
EF Loney	864	269	9	4–35	29.88
WWH Hill-Wood	410	252	8	3–20	31.50
JM Hutchinson	300	122	7	2–11	17.42
AHM Jackson	354	159	6	2–19	26.50
T S Worthington	258	99	5	2–21	19.80
JS Heath	120	85	1	1–45	85.00
GR Jackson	60	41	1	1–23	41.00
W Shardlow	354	208	0		
G Beet	24	9	0		
LB Blaxland	48	17	0		
E Sykes	6	2	0		
J Bowden	12	3	0		

All Derbyshire's first class matches were in the County Championship, and so the above table represents first-class statistics as well.

== Wicket-keeper ==
- Harry Elliott Catches 41, Stumping 17
- Jim Hutchinson Catches 12, Stumping 1

== See also ==
- Derbyshire County Cricket Club seasons
- 1925 English cricket season
