= Derbyshire County Cricket Club in 1922 =

1922 season of an English cricket team

Derbyshire County Cricket Club seasons
1922 season
- Captain: Guy Jackson
- County Championship: 11
- Most runs: Samuel Cadman
- Most wickets: Arthur Morton
- Most catches: Harry Elliott

Derbyshire County Cricket Club in 1922 represents the cricket season when the English club Derbyshire had been playing for fifty-one years. It was their twenty-fourth season in the County Championship and they won six matches to finish eleventh.

== 1922 season ==
Derbyshire played all their twenty two first-class games in the County Championship in 1922 and won six, to finish eleventh in the table.

Guy Jackson took over as captain and led Derbyshire for nine seasons "with masterly judgment". Although he was a stern disciplinarian, he earned the respect and affection of his players. By the time he retired at the end of the 1930 summer, he had laid the foundations of the team that won the Championship six years later. Wisden noted "For his work in leading and inspiring the team, Jackson deserves immense thanks. He took over control when the fortunes of the county were at a very low ebb, steadily raised the standard of the cricket, and now retires with Derbyshire well established amongst the leading teams of the day."

There was an occurrence considered unique in county cricket during the season. When Billy Bestwick and Robert Bestwick shared the bowling against Willie Quaife and Bernard Quaife of Warwickshire, father and son were bowling against father and son. Gilbert Curgenven was noted for his fast scoring rate and at Gloucester, he scored 65 in the first innings at little more than one run a minute and in the second innings his 68 out of 119 took less than twenty-five minutes.

The most significant newcomer for Derbyshire was Leslie Townsend, a gifted all-rounder who played for seventeen years. Others who made their debut were Repton schoolmaster John Crommelin-Brown who went on to play several matches over four seasons and footballer Stuart McMillan who appeared intermittently over three seasons. Colin Leech made his only career appearance in the first class game for Derbyshire during the season.

=== Matches ===
List of matches
No.	Date	V	Result	Margin	Notes
1	13 May 1922	Northamptonshire; County Ground, Northampton	Won	2 wickets	Woolley 111; A Morton 7-38 and 5-65; Wells 6-25
2	17 May 1922	Yorkshire; County Ground, Derby	Lost	251 runs	A Morton 5-55; Waddington 7-31
3	20 May 1922	Nottinghamshire; Town Ground, Worksop	Lost	Innings and 130 runs	W Bestwick 7–189; Richmond 6-54
4	27 May 1922	Essex; County Ground, Leyton	Lost	9 wickets	Freeman 141; A Morton 100
5	31 May 1922	Lancashire; Queen's Park, Chesterfield	Lost	Innings and 140 runs	Makepeace 134; Parkin 7-15 and 7-58
6	03 Jun 1922	Warwickshire; County Ground, Derby	Lost	10 wickets	Willie Quaife 107, Howell 5-60
7	07 Jun 1922	Somerset; County Ground, Taunton	Lost	55 runs	A Morton 5-69 and 7-39; Bridges 5-76; White 6-42
8	10 Jun 1922	Gloucestershire; Spa Ground, Gloucester	Won	158 runs	Parker 5-66 and 9-87; W Bestwick 5-59
9	14 Jun 1922	Glamorgan; St Helen's, Swansea	Won	283 runs	Clay 7-94; A Morton 5-64
10	17 Jun 1922	Leicestershire; The Town Ground, Burton-on-Trent	Lost	226 runs	W Bestwick 5-65; Benskin 7-68 and 6-76
11	24 Jun 1922	Glamorgan; County Ground, Derby	Won	137 runs	Clay 7-96
12	01 Jul 1922	Somerset; Queen's Park, Chesterfield	Drawn		
13	05 Jul 1922	Yorkshire; Bramall Lane, Sheffield	Drawn		
14	15 Jul 1922	Leicestershire; Aylestone Road, Leicester	Drawn		W Carter 145; Benskin 5-87; W Bestwick 7-63
15	19 Jul 1922	Gloucestershire; Queen's Park, Chesterfield	Lost	4 wickets	Parker 6-72; W Bestwick 5-55SWA Cadman 5-50; Mills 7-30
16	22 Jul 1922	Worcestershire; County Ground, Derby	Won	Innings and 77 runs	H Storer 99; Pearson 5-57; W Bestwick 8-19
17	29 Jul 1922	Nottinghamshire; Queen's Park, Chesterfield	Lost	7 wickets	Matthews 5-29
18	05 Aug 1922	Warwickshire; Edgbaston, Birmingham	Drawn		
19	09 Aug 1922	Essex; County Ground, Derby	Drawn		Perrin 100
20	12 Aug 1922	Lancashire; Aigburth, Liverpool	Lost	9 wickets	Hallows 102; Parkin 6-45
21	19 Aug 1922	Northamptonshire; Queen's Park, Chesterfield	Won	53 runs	W Bestwick 7-37; Murdin 5-45; H Storer 7-26
22	26 Aug 1922	Worcestershire; County Ground, New Road, Worcester	Drawn		A Morton 5-112

== Statistics ==
=== County Championship batting averages ===
Name	Matches	Inns	Runs	High score	Average	100s
JL Crommelin-Brown	1	2	57	56	28.50	0
W Carter	14	23	419	145	23.27	1
G Curgenven	8	16	343	68	21.43	0
SWA Cadman	22	40	745	78	20.13	0
GR Jackson	19	36	631	69	19.12	0
C Leech	1	2	38	26	19.00	0
WWH Hill-Wood	4	6	111	43	18.50	0
WJV Tomlinson	12	17	294	66	18.37	0
A Morton	21	37	583	100*	18.21	1
AHM Jackson	21	36	580	75	18.12	0
J Bowden	21	38	654	68	17.67	0
G Beet	1	2	34	21	17.00	0
JM Hutchinson	22	39	634	67	16.68	0
H Storer	21	38	571	99	15.43	0
H Elliott	22	37	237	41	10.30	0
AG Slater	1	2	20	20	10.00	0
JD Southern	1	2	14	10	7.00	0
L Oliver	3	6	35	13	5.83	0
L F Townsend	4	8	41	13	5.12	0
RS Bestwick	3	5	20	10	5.00	0
W Bestwick	18	29	80	13	3.63	0
J Fisher	1	2	7	4	3.50	0
ST McMillan	1	1	0	0*		0

=== County Championship bowling averages ===
Name	Balls	Runs	Wickets	BB	Average
A Morton	4974	1859	100	7-38	18.59
W Bestwick	4326	1577	92	8-19	17.14
H Storer	1553	706	30	7-26	23.53
SWA Cadman	2161	725	30	5-50	24.16
AHM Jackson	684	387	10	3-16	38.70
WWH Hill-Wood	290	138	8	4-51	17.25
WJV Tomlinson	491	240	4	2-10	60.00
L F Townsend	90	49	3	2-24	16.33
W Carter	198	119	3	1-1	39.66
RS Bestwick	232	96	2	2-47	48.00
AG Slater	162	119	2	2-65	59.50
JL Crommelin-Brown	30	29	1	1-29	29.00
J Fisher	30	15	0		
JM Hutchinson	20	27	0		
GR Jackson	6	2	0		
ST McMillan	6	14	0		

=== Wicket Keeper ===
- H Elliott - Catches 30, Stumping 5

== See also ==
- Derbyshire County Cricket Club seasons
- 1922 English cricket season
