= Derbyshire County Cricket Club in 1928 =

1928 season of an English cricket team

Derbyshire County Cricket Club seasons
1928 season
- Captain: Guy Jackson
- County Championship: 10
- Most runs: Harry Storer
- Most wickets: Leslie Townsend
- Most catches: Harry Elliott

Derbyshire County Cricket Club in 1928 was the cricket season when the English club Derbyshire had been playing for 57 years. It was their thirtieth season in the County Championship, and they won six matches to finish tenth in the County Championship..

== 1928 season ==
Derbyshire played 26 games in the County Championship, and one match each against the touring West Indies, Oxford University and MCC. Their six wins were all in the County Championship, while they drew with Oxford University and lost to the West Indies.

Guy Jackson was in his seventh season as captain. The season saw the arrival of three players who were significant in the club's victory in the County Championship in the 1936 season, including the captain of the team Arthur Walker Richardson. Tommy Mitchell was a miner who changed to cricket as a result of the General Strike and in the next 10 years took over 1200 wickets for Derbyshire. Albert Alderman came through Sam Cadman's coaching scheme and scored over 12,000 runs for Derbyshire in the next 20 years. Two of the Hill Wood brothers Charles and Denis made their debuts and went on the play a couple of seasons for Derbyshire. Charles was at Oxford where he also played. Cecil Tate son of Fred Tate the coach played four matches but only in the 1928 season, and subsequently went to Warwickshire. Robin Buckston son of former captain George Buckston and George Beet son of former wicket-keeper George Beet both made single appearances as stand-in wicket-keepers in the season although Buckston returned in the 1937 season as captain.

Harry Storer was top scorer and Leslie Townsend took most wickets.

=== Matches ===
List of matches
No.	Date	V	Result	Margin	Notes
1	5 May 1928	West Indies; County Ground, Derby	Lost	2 wickets	AG Slater 8–24
2	12 May 1928	Glamorgan; Rutland Recreation Ground, Ilkeston	Drawn		Hills 111; Mercer 6–76; L F Townsend 6–72; Ryan 6–88
3	16 May 1928	Sussex; County Ground, Hove	Drawn		
4	19 May 1928	Somerset; Queen's Park, Chesterfield	Drawn		Greswell 5–74
5	23 May 1928	Oxford University; The University Parks, Oxford	Drawn		GM Lee 5–42
6	26 May 1928	Warwickshire; County Ground, Derby	Lost	6 wickets	JM Hutchinson 111; Wyatt 104
7	30 May 1928	Northamptonshire; County Ground, Northampton	Lost	8 wickets	GM Lee 155 and 5–57
8	2 Jun 1928	Essex; Queen's Park, Chesterfield	Drawn		T S Worthington 133
9	6 Jun 1928	MCC; Lord's Cricket Ground, St John's Wood	Lost	7 wickets	T S Worthington 101; Hearne 110; Jupp 7–89
10	9 Jun 1928	Essex; Southchurch Park, Southend-on-Sea	Drawn		
11	13 Jun 1928	Leicestershire; College Ground, Loughborough	Drawn		T S Worthington 121; AG Slater 5–29
12	16 Jun 1928	Northamptonshire; County Ground, Derby	Won	Innings and 50 runs	GR Jackson 106;
13	20 Jun 1928	Glamorgan; Cardiff Arms Park	Won	10 wickets	AG Slater 5–53; GM Lee 6–44
14	23 Jun 1928	Worcestershire; Queen's Park, Chesterfield	Won	Innings and 10 runs	AG Slater 7–40
15	27 Jun 1928	Gloucestershire; Rutland Recreation Ground, Ilkeston	Drawn		H Storer 167
16	7 Jul 1928	Kent; Queen's Park, Chesterfield	Lost	6 wickets	H Storer 113; GM Lee 100; Hardinge 152; Freeman 6–71 and 6–125; T S Worthington 8–41
17	11 Jul 1928	Yorkshire; County Ground, Derby	Lost	Innings and 52 runs	Sutcliffe 111; Leyland 149; Macaulay 5–76
18	21 Jul 1928	Kent; Mote Park, Maidstone	Drawn		Crawley 109; Woolley 198
19	25 Jul 1928	Somerset; County Ground, Taunton	Won	4 wickets	CKH Hill-Wood 5–76
20	28 Jul 1928	Gloucestershire; Greenbank, Bristol	Drawn		Hammond 134; Sinfield 5–78
21	1 Aug 1928	Sussex; Queen's Park, Chesterfield	Drawn		Bowley 104 and 6–106; L F Townsend 8–48 and 5–63
22	4 Aug 1928	Warwickshire; Edgbaston, Birmingham	Drawn		Quaife 115; Parsons 114; Durnell 5–63
23	8 Aug 1928	Worcestershire; Chester Road North Ground, Kidderminster	Won	2 wickets	L F Townsend 6–84; Root 6–107 and 5–61; GM Lee 5–99
24	11 Aug 1928	Leicestershire; County Ground, Derby	Won	242 runs	GM Lee 107 and 5–31; T S Worthington 5–39
25	15 Aug 1928	Yorkshire; Dewsbury and Savile Ground	Lost	Innings and 22 runs	Sutcliffe 138; Rhodes 7–55; Bedford 6–91
26	18 Aug 1928	Nottinghamshire; Rutland Recreation Ground, Ilkeston	Drawn		Whysall 157; Barratt 5–62
27	25 Aug 1928	Nottinghamshire; Trent Bridge, Nottingham	Drawn		Larwood 5–26
28	29 Aug 1928	Lancashire; Stanley Park, Blackpool	Drawn		Watson 122; Hallows 117; Hopwood 5–71
29	1 Sep 1928	Lancashire; The Town Ground, Burton-on-Trent	Lost	Innings and 49 runs	T S Worthington 6–83

== Statistics ==
=== County Championship batting averages ===
Name	Matches	Inns	Runs	High score	Average	100s
H Storer	23	36	1179	167	33.68	2
L F Townsend	26	36	841	98	30.03	0
GR Jackson	23	34	941	106	29.40	1
T S Worthington	25	37	936	133	29.25	2
J Bowden	22	35	942	92	28.54	0
GM Lee	26	41	1038	155	27.31	3
A E Alderman	1	1	26	26	26.00	0
CKH Hill-Wood	7	8	123	57	24.60	0
JM Hutchinson	26	41	933	111	23.92	1
AG Slater	26	39	779	74	22.25	0
A W Richardson	20	29	531	70*	22.12	0
H Elliott	24	28	303	47*	20.20	0
DJCH Hill-Wood	3	5	76	36	19.00	0
NM Ford	7	10	167	64	16.70	0
CF Tate	4	4	48	21	16.00	0
D Smith	6	9	132	58	14.66	0
RHR Buckston	1	2	13	13*	13.00	0
W Shardlow	3	4	23	15*	7.66	0
T. B. Mitchell	12	12	50	12	7.14	0
GHC Beet	1	2	10	10	5.00	0

Leading first-class batsmen for Derbyshire by runs scored
Name	Mat	Inns	Runs	HS	Ave	100
H Storer	26	41	1254	167	30.59	2
GM Lee	29	46	1221	155	26.54	3
GR Jackson	26	39	1078	106	27.64	1
T S Worthington	28	42	1059	133	25.21	3
J Bowden	24	38	1011	92	26.61	0

(a) Figures adjusted for non CC matches

=== County Championship bowling averages ===
Name	Balls	Runs	Wickets	BB	Average
L F Townsend	5882	2070	87	8–48	23.79
T S Worthington	4344	1657	62	8–41	26.72
GM Lee	3831	1534	59	6–44	26.00
AG Slater	4171	1451	50	7–40	29.02
CKH Hill-Wood	1329	673	21	5–76	32.04
T. B. Mitchell	1701	742	17	3–42	43.64
H Storer	1365	601	16	3–14	37.56
CF Tate	318	112	2	2–9	56.00
W Shardlow	348	132	3	2–12	44.00
D Smith	57	35	2	1–7	17.50
JM Hutchinson	105	76	2	1–0	38.00
DJCH Hill-Wood	48	23	1	1–22	23.00
NM Ford	36	43	1	1–19	43.00
GR Jackson	18	10	1	1–10	10.00
J Bowden	18	4	0		

Leading first class bowlers for Derbyshire by wickets taken
Name	Balls	Runs	Wkts	BBI	Ave
L F Townsend	6711	2313	103	8–48	22.46
GM Lee	4418	1699	67	6–44	25.35
AG Slater	4801	1630	64	8–24	25.47
T S Worthington	4804	1851	64	8–41	28.92

=== Wicket keeping ===
- Harry Elliott Catches 43 Stumping 19 (Elliott retired hurt in the MCC match and was absent from two other matches)
- George Beet, Jr. (Kent 21 July) Catches 3, Stumping 1
- Harry Storer (MCC ) Catches 2, Stumping 1
- Robin Buckston (Lancs 1 Sept) Catches 1, Stumping 1
- Jim Hutchinson (Lancs 29 Aug) Catches 12 Stumping 1

== See also ==
- Derbyshire County Cricket Club seasons
- 1928 English cricket season
