= Derbyshire County Cricket Club in 1926 =

1926 season of an English cricket team

Derbyshire County Cricket Club seasons
1926 season
- Captain: Guy Jackson
- County Championship: 11
- Most runs: Harry Storer
- Most wickets: Stan Worthington
- Most catches: Harry Elliott

Derbyshire County Cricket Club in 1926 represents the cricket season when the English club Derbyshire had been playing for fifty five years. It was their twenty-eighth season in the County Championship and they won five matches to finish eleventh in the County Championship.

== 1926 season ==
Derbyshire played 24 games in the County Championship, and one match against the touring Australians. The majority of matches were drawn, and Derbyshire suffered heavy defeats at the hands of champion county Lancashire.

Guy Jackson was in his fifth season as captain. Harry Storer was top scorer and took 41 wickets as well. Stan Worthington took most wickets with 56.

Neville Ford played the first of several seasons for Derbyshire but William Parrington appeared only in 1926. Henry Jordan played in just one match without scoring, while Albert Blount reappeared for two matches twelve years after he had last played for the county. Stalwarts Samuel Cadman and Arthur Morton played their last games for the club.

=== Matches ===
List of matches
No.	Date	V	Result	Margin	Notes
1	8 May 1926	Yorkshire; Rutland Recreation Ground, Ilkeston	Drawn		Macaulay 6–34
2	15 May 1926	Lancashire; Old Trafford, Manchester	Lost	Innings and 214 runs	Hallows 110
3	22 May 1926	Warwickshire; County Ground, Derby	Drawn		Bates 187; Partridge 5–77
4	26 May 1926	Northamptonshire; County Ground, Northampton	Drawn		Jupp 109; H Storer 5–46
5	29 May 1926	Glamorgan; Queen's Park, Chesterfield	Lost	8 wickets	Bates 100; Mercer 5–50
6	5 Jun 1926	Essex; County Ground, Derby	Lost	Innings and 153 runs	Freeman 172; AHM Jackson 5–84; Palmer 5–31
7	9 Jun 1926	Kent; Garrison 1 Cricket Ground, Chatham	Drawn		Hardinge 134; Freeman 5–82; Wright 5–36
8	12 Jun 1926	Leicestershire; Queen's Park, Chesterfield	Abandoned		
9	19 Jun 1926	Gloucestershire; The Town Ground, Burton-on-Trent	Drawn		Dipper 118
10	23 Jun 1926	Australians; Queen's Park, Chesterfield	Drawn		Bardsley 127
11	26 Jun 1926	Somerset; Recreation Ground, Bath	Lost	Innings and 1 run	Bridges 5–59; Hunt 5–90
12	30 Jun 1926	Gloucestershire; Greenbank, Bristol	Won	6 wickets	GM Lee 5–89; Sinfield 5–80
13	3 Jul 1926	Glamorgan; Ynysangharad Park, Pontypridd	Drawn		Riches 136; H Storer 5–90
14	10 Jul 1926	Somerset; County Ground, Derby	Won	139 runs	H Storer 132 and 6–48; Bridges 5–120
15	14 Jul 1926	Yorkshire; Bramall Lane, Sheffield	Drawn		
16	17 Jul 1926	Leicestershire; Aylestone Road, Leicester	Lost	Innings and 51 runs	Taylor 107; Lord 5–40; GM Lee 5–57
17	24 Jul 1926	Lancashire; Queen's Park, Chesterfield	Lost	Innings and 150 runs	Hallows 100; Watson 109; Tyldesley 5–17 and 5–18
18	28 Jul 1926	Worcestershire; Rutland Recreation Ground, Ilkeston	Won	2 wickets	Fox 105; Root 5–56 and 6–83; A Morton 5–44
19	31 Jul 1926	Warwickshire; Edgbaston, Birmingham	Drawn		J Bowden 106; W Quaife 5–81; GM Lee 6–76
20	4 Aug 1926	Worcestershire; Chester Road North Ground, Kidderminster	Won	83 runs	Fox 141; Wilson 5–97 and 5–74; A Morton 5–71
21	7 Aug 1926	Nottinghamshire; Trent Bridge, Nottingham	Drawn		Payton 133; H Larwood 5–44; Richmond 5–98
22	11 Aug 1926	Essex; County Ground, Leyton	Drawn		Russell 102*; A Morton 5–94
23	14 Aug 1926	Nottinghamshire; Rutland Recreation Ground, Ilkeston	Lost	50 runs	Payton 100*; Staples 5–76 and 6–51; Richmond 5–78; L F Townsend 6–32
24	18 Aug 1926	Northamptonshire; Queen's Park, Chesterfield	Won	Innings and 69 runs	L F Townsend 5–14; Jupp 5–98
25	21 Aug 1926	Kent; County Ground, Derby	Drawn		GM Lee 191 and 5–87; T S Worthington 5–74; Freeman 6–120

== Statistics ==
=== County Championship batting averages ===
Name	Matches	Inns	Runs	High score	Average	100s
H Storer	21	37	1206	132	36.54	1
J Bowden	23	40	1189	106	30.48	1
GM Lee	22	40	1103	191	29.02	1
GR Jackson	23	39	845	98	21.66	0
L F Townsend	23	40	793	89	20.86	0
JL Crommelin-Brown	7	11	229	68	20.81	0
T S Worthington	23	36	656	84	20.50	0
EF Loney	6	10	164	39*	20.50	0
JM Hutchinson	23	38	696	81	19.88	0
AHM Jackson	6	10	110	36*	18.33	0
A Morton	19	28	361	56*	16.40	0
WF Parrington	6	11	148	47	14.80	0
NM Ford	2	2	28	20	14.00	0
A Blount	2	3	41	17	13.66	0
H Elliott	23	32	222	34*	11.68	0
W Carter	4	6	69	35	11.50	0
JA Cresswell	8	11	61	18*	10.16	0
SWA Cadman	1	2	19	13	9.50	0
W Shardlow	10	13	37	16	4.11	0
HGB Jordan	1	2	0	0	0.00	0

=== County Championship bowling averages ===
Name	Balls	Runs	Wickets	BB	Average
T S Worthington	4481	1656	56	5–74	29.57
A Morton	3515	1233	49	5–44	25.16
H Storer	3178	1406	41	6–48	34.29
GM Lee	2186	965	40	6–76	24.12
L F Townsend	2254	854	38	6–32	22.47
W Shardlow	1753	761	20	4–64	38.05
AHM Jackson	660	371	17	5–84	21.82
JA Cresswell	966	371	11	2–34	33.72
JM Hutchinson	786	434	11	2–9	39.45
EF Loney	834	259	11	4–27	23.54
SWA Cadman	228	85	2	1–25	42.50
A Blount	186	70	1	1–38	70.00
W Carter	132	82	0		
GR Jackson	90	42	0		

== Wicket-keeper ==
H Elliott Catches 35 Stumping 12

== See also ==
- Derbyshire County Cricket Club seasons
- 1926 English cricket season
