= Derbyshire County Cricket Club in 1927 =

1927 season of an English cricket team

Derbyshire County Cricket Club seasons
1927 season
- Captain: Guy Jackson
- County Championship: 5
- Most runs: Archibald Slater
- Most wickets: GM Lee
- Most catches: Harry Elliott

Derbyshire County Cricket Club in 1927 represents the cricket season when the English club Derbyshire had been playing for fifty six years. It was their twenty-ninth season in the County Championship and they won eight matches to finish fifth in the County Championship..

== 1927 season ==
Derbyshire played 24 games in the County Championship, and one match against the touring New Zealanders. They lost to the New Zealanders but lost only three championship games while most of the matches ended in draws.

Guy Jackson was in his sixth season as captain. Archibald Slater was top scorer and GM Lee took most wickets with 72. In the match against Northamptonshire at Northampton, Lee scored a century and took a total of 12 wickets

Denis Smith made his debut in 1927, the start of a long career with the club. Archibald Slater returned to play for Derbyshire having last played in the 1921 season.

=== Matches ===
List of matches
No.	Date	V	Result	Margin	Notes
1	11 May 1927	Kent; Garrison 1 Cricket Ground, Chatham	Won	64 runs	Woolley 187; T S Worthington 5-70
2	14 May 1927	Lancashire; Rutland Recreation Ground, Ilkeston	Drawn		R Tyldesley 5-31; L F Townsend 5-29
3	21 May 1927	Glamorgan; Queen's Park, Chesterfield	Drawn		JM Hutchinson 110; Mercer 5-169; W Shardlow 5-41
4	28 May 1927	Kent; County Ground, Derby	Lost	127 runs	Evans 100; Freeman 6-64; H Storer 5-32; Ashdown 5-29
5	01 Jun 1927	Essex; Rutland Recreation Ground, Ilkeston	Won	202 runs	Nichols 7-89
6	04 Jun 1927	Warwickshire; Edgbaston, Birmingham	Drawn		E Smith 177; AG Slater 105; Mayer 6-23
7	08 Jun 1927	Somerset; County Ground, Taunton	Won	5 wickets	GR Jackson 134; GM Lee 6-34
8	11 Jun 1927	Glamorgan; St Helen's, Swansea	Won	3 wickets	GM Lee 5-25; Ryan 5-62
9	18 Jun 1927	Somerset; Queen's Park, Chesterfield	Won	138 runs	White 8-62
10	22 Jun 1927	Gloucestershire; County Ground, Derby	Drawn		Dipper 131
11	25 Jun 1927	Lancashire; Old Trafford, Manchester	Drawn		
12	29 Jun 1927	Gloucestershire; Wagon Works Ground, Gloucester	Drawn		JM Hutchinson 102; Mills 7-98
13	02 Jul 1927	Worcestershire; County Ground, New Road, Worcester	Drawn		H Storer 6-47;
14	06 Jul 1927	Worcestershire; Queen's Park, Chesterfield	Drawn		
15	09 Jul 1927	Leicestershire; Aylestone Road, Leicester	Lost	7 wickets	H Storer 5-66; Geary 6-18
16	16 Jul 1927	Essex; Southchurch Park, Southend-on-Sea	Drawn		Nichols 8-46; GM Lee 5-43
17	23 Jul 1927	Northamptonshire; The Town Ground, Burton-on-Trent	Won	Innings and 47 runs	GM Lee 5-41; L F Townsend 5-42
18	30 Jul 1927	Warwickshire; County Ground, Derby	Won	2 wickets	
19	03 Aug 1927	Northamptonshire; County Ground, Northampton	Won	9 wickets	GM Lee 100* and 5-65 and 7-78
20	06 Aug 1927	Nottinghamshire; Trent Bridge, Nottingham	Drawn		H Storer 148;
21	10 Aug 1927	Yorkshire; The Circle, Hull	Drawn		Macaulay 8-37; L F Townsend 5-71
22	13 Aug 1927	New Zealand; County Ground, Derby	Lost	Innings and 240 runs	Dacre 176; Mills 100; Merritt 6-63
23	17 Aug 1927	Yorkshire; Queen's Park, Chesterfield	Drawn		
24	20 Aug 1927	Leicestershire; County Ground, Derby	Drawn		
25	27 Aug 1927	Nottinghamshire; Rutland Recreation Ground, Ilkeston	Lost	9 wickets	Payton 136; H Storer 106; Staples 5-83

== Statistics ==
=== County Championship batting averages ===
Name	Matches	Inns	Runs	High score	Average	100s
AG Slater	24	36	941	105	27.67	1
H Storer	23	36	900	148	27.27	2
JM Hutchinson	23	34	818	110	27.26	2
T S Worthington	22	31	749	98	25.82	0
GM Lee	24	34	823	100*	25.71	1
GR Jackson	21	34	817	134	24.75	1
J Bowden	24	36	783	90	23.72	0
L F Townsend	23	32	564	84	19.44	0
AHM Jackson	15	18	260	43	18.57	0
EF Loney	13	18	258	36	18.42	0
NM Ford	1	2	34	20	17.00	0
JA Cresswell	3	6	52	28	13.00	0
H Elliott	24	30	195	32*	10.83	0
W Shardlow	21	20	121	39*	9.30	0
D Smith	3	2	1	1	0.50	0

=== County Championship bowling averages ===
Name	Balls	Runs	Wickets	BB	Average
GM Lee	3709	1268	72	7-78	17.61
L F Townsend	4149	1206	66	5-29	18.27
T S Worthington	3201	1133	48	5-70	23.60
AG Slater	2525	848	38	4-33	22.31
H Storer	2114	869	34	6-47	25.55
W Shardlow	2089	802	33	5-41	24.30
AHM Jackson	156	79	3	2-24	26.33
JM Hutchinson	186	107	2	2-18	53.50
EF Loney	324	122	0		
JA Cresswell	120	38	0		
D Smith	60	9	0		
GR Jackson	12	5	0		
J Bowden	4	1	0		

== Wicket Keeper ==
H Elliott Catches 33 Stumping 14

== See also ==
- Derbyshire County Cricket Club seasons
- 1927 English cricket season
