= Derbyshire County Cricket Club in 1929 =

1929 season of an English cricket team

Derbyshire County Cricket Club
1929 season
- Captain: Guy Jackson
- County Championship: 7
- Most runs: Harry Storer
- Most wickets: Tommy Mitchell
- Most catches: Harry Elliott

Derbyshire County Cricket Club in 1929 represents the cricket season when the English club Derbyshire had been playing for fifty eight years. It was their thirty-first season in the County Championship and they came seventh in the competition after winning ten matches in the championship.

== 1929 season ==
Derbyshire played 28 games in the County Championship, one match against Oxford University and one match against the touring South Africans. They won eleven matches altogether.

Guy Jackson was in his eighth year as captain. Harry Storer was top scorer with four centuries, two of them scored in the same match against Sussex. Storer and Joseph Bowden achieved a 1st wicket partnership of 322 against Essex, which remains a Derbyshire record. Tommy Mitchell took 104 wickets.

Thomas Armstrong made his debut in 1929 and went on to play many seasons for Derbyshire. Charles Clarke also made his debut and played for four seasons. Horace Wass a footballer played in just one match for Derbyshire during 1929.

=== Matches ===
List of matches
No.	Date	V	Result	Margin	Notes
1	8 May 1929	Lancashire; County Ground, Derby	Lost	7 wickets	Dick Tyldesley 6–48 and 6–33 including a hattrick; Tommy Mitchell 5–34
2	11 May 1929	Leicestershire; Aylestone Road, Leicester	Drawn		
3	15 May 1929	Hampshire; United Services Recreation Ground, Portsmouth	Won	5 wickets	Tommy Mitchell 6–42; Kennedy 9–46
4	18 May 1929	Warwickshire; Edgbaston, Birmingham	Won	147 runs	Bob Wyatt 104; Tommy Mitchell 5–46 and 6–83
5	22 May 1929	Northamptonshire; Rutland Recreation Ground, Ilkeston	Drawn		
6	25 May 1929	Sussex; County Ground, Derby	Won	135 runs	Harry Storer 119 and 100; T S Worthington 8–29
7	29 May 1929	Hampshire; Queen's Park, Chesterfield	Won	Innings and 99 runs	Tommy Mitchell 5–20; GM Lee 134; AG Slater 5–50
8	1 Jun 1929	Somerset; The Town Ground, Burton-on-Trent	Won	Innings and 8 runs	JM Hutchinson 138; Wellard 5–96; Tommy Mitchell 6–64
9	5 Jun 1929	South Africans County Ground, Derby f12457	Drawn		
10	8 Jun 1929	Worcestershire; Amblecote, Stourbridge	Won	116 runs	T S Worthington 5–21
11	15 Jun 1929	Oxford University; The University Parks, Oxford	Won	7 wickets	Garthwaite 5–74; NM Ford and CKH Hill-Wood played for the university instead of Derbyshire
12	22 Jun 1929	Kent; Queen's Park, Chesterfield	Lost	Innings and 117 runs	Hardinge 115; Wolley 155; Freeman 7–117 and 7–63;
13	29 Jun 1929	Essex; County Ground, Derby	Drawn		Harry Storer 209;J Bowden 120; Eastman 161; Russell 102
14	3 Jul 1929	Yorkshire; Queen's Park, Chesterfield	Drawn		T S Worthington 5–72; Robinson 5–64
15	6 Jul 1929	Worcestershire; Rutland Recreation Ground, Ilkeston	Won	8 wickets	AG Slater 5–27
16	10 Jul 1929	Somerset; Recreation Ground, Bath	Won	132 runs	GM Lee 118; White 5–23
17	13 Jul 1929	Glamorgan; Cardiff Arms Park	Drawn		Bell 100; Arnott 5–72
18	17 Jul 1929	Leicestershire; Queen's Park, Chesterfield	Lost	49 runs	Armstrong 128; Geary 6–27
19	20 Jul 1929	Middlesex; Lord's Cricket Ground, St John's Wood	Lost	8 wickets	Durston 7–50
20	24 Jul 1929	Sussex; County Ground, Hove	Lost	Innings and 36 runs	Ted Bowley 9–114; Harold Gilligan 143; Kumar Shri Duleepsinhji 118
21	27 Jul 1929	Middlesex; County Ground, Derby	Lost	78 runs	T S Worthington 5–83;
22	31 Jul 1929	Lancashire; Old Trafford, Manchester	Drawn		
23	3 Aug 1929	Warwickshire; County Ground, Derby	Drawn		Mayer 5–21
24	7 Aug 1929	Northamptonshire; County Ground, Northampton	Won	42 runs	Jupp 5–31; AG Slater 6–54; L F Townsend 5–59
25	10 Aug 1929	Nottinghamshire; Trent Bridge, Nottingham	Drawn		Harry Storer 176; GM Lee 5–111
26	14 Aug 1929	Yorkshire; Bramall Lane, Sheffield	Drawn		Macaulay 5–62
27	17 Aug 1929	Kent; Crabble Athletic Ground, Dover	Drawn		Legge 113; Bryan 124; Wright 5–82
28	21 Aug 1929	Essex; Southchurch Park, Southend-on-Sea	Won	8 wickets	GM Lee 113; T S Worthington 7–68
29	24 Aug 1929	Glamorgan; Queen's Park, Chesterfield	Drawn		AG Slater 5–36
30	31 Aug 1929	Nottinghamshire; Rutland Recreation Ground, Ilkeston	Drawn		

== Statistics ==
=== County Championship batting averages ===
Name	Matches	Inns	Runs	High score	Average	100s
H Storer	27	46	1532	209	36.47	4
GM Lee	24	42	1205	134	31.71	3
A W Richardson	6	10	169	60*	28.16	0
J Bowden	13	21	544	120	27.20	1
A E Alderman	13	15	276	53*	25.09	0
L F Townsend	27	35	801	63	25.03	0
AG Slater	27	38	876	95	25.02	0
GR Jackson	28	45	941	70	24.76	0
T S Worthington	28	45	999	72	23.23	0
CKH Hill-Wood	8	10	206	72	22.88	0
JM Hutchinson	28	40	783	138	22.37	1
D Smith	15	22	264	43	13.89	0
CC Clarke	4	4	55	33	13.75	0
H Elliott	28	36	280	47	12.72	0
NM Ford	3	6	57	27	9.50	0
H Wass	1	1	9	9	9.00	0
T. B. Mitchell	26	31	144	23	6.26	0
T R Armstrong	1	2	2	1*	2.00	0
DJCH Hill-Wood	1	2	0	0	0.00	0

=== County Championship bowling averages ===
Name	Balls	Runs	Wickets	BB	Average
T. B. Mitchell	4858	1968	103	6–42	19.10
L F Townsend	6342	1868	91	5–59	20.52
T S Worthington	5337	2012	83	8–29	24.24
AG Slater	5544	1690	81	6–54	20.86
GM Lee	2036	755	29	5–111	26.03
CKH Hill-Wood	1241	412	12	2–34	34.33
H Storer	700	384	5	2–35	76.80
D Smith	288	119	4	2–35	29.75
A E Alderman	96	37	3	3–37	12.33
T R Armstrong	126	30	0		
J Bowden	12	4	0		
NM Ford	5	9	0		
JM Hutchinson	120	58	0		
GR Jackson	6	5	0		

== Wicket-keeper ==
- H Elliott Catches 47 Stumping 17

== See also ==
- Derbyshire County Cricket Club seasons
- 1929 English cricket season
