= Eric Sykes (disambiguation) =

Eric Sykes (1923–2012) was an English comedian, writer, actor and director.

Eric Sykes may also refer to:

- Eric A. Sykes (1883–1945), inventor of the Fairbairn-Sykes fighting knife
- Eric Sykes (cricketer) (1906–1989), English cricketer
