= List of Durham County Cricket Club seasons =

This is a list of seasons played by Durham County Cricket Club in English cricket, from the club's first appearance in a major competition to the most recent completed season. It details the club's achievements in major competitions, and the top run-scorers and wicket-takers for each season.

== Seasons ==
Season	County Championship									National League									FPT	B&H	T20	Most runs		Most wickets	
Season	Div	P	W	L	D	Tie	Abdn	Pts	Pos	Div	P	W	L	NR	Tie	Abdn	Pts	Pos	FPT	B&H	T20	Most runs		Most wickets	
1964																			R2						
Durham did not appear in any major domestic cricket competition in 1965 or 1966.
1967																			R1						
1968																			R1						
Durham did not appear in any major domestic cricket competition between 1969 and 1971.
1972																			R2						
1973																			R2						
1974																			R2						
Durham did not appear in any major domestic cricket competition in 1975 or 1976.
1977																			R1						
1978																			R1						
1979																			R2						
1980																			R1						
1981																			R1						
1982																			R1						
1983																			R1						
1984																			R1						
1985																			R2						
1986																			R1						
1987																			R1						
1988																			R1						
1989																			R1						
1990																			R1						
1991																			R1						
1992		22	2	10	10	0	0	131	18th		17	7	7	2	0	1	34	8th	QF	Grp		Wayne Larkins	1,417	Simon Brown	56
1993		17	2	10	5	0	0	113	18th		17	8	7	2	0	0	36	7th	R2	R1		Phil Bainbridge	1,116	Anderson Cummins	51
1994		17	4	10	3	0	0	153	16th		17	6	7	1	1	2	32	9th	R2	R1		John Morris	1,369	Simon Brown	66
1995		17	4	13	0	0	0	137	17th		17	4	9	1	1	2	24	16th	R2	R2		John Morris	1,123	Simon Brown	52
1996		17	0	12	5	0	0	97	18th		17	1	15	0	0	1	6	18th	R2	Grp		Sherwin Campbell	1,019	Simon Brown	69
1997		17	2	8	6	0	1	131	17th		17	3	13	0	0	1	14	17th	R1	Grp		Jonathan Lewis	1,034	Simon Brown	57
1998		17	3	9	5	0	0	158	14th		17	4	9	1	1	2	24	17th	R2	QF		David Boon	953	John Wood	61
1999		17	6	7	4	0	0	188	8th	Div 2	16	3	12	1	0	0	14	9th	R3	n/a		Jonathan Lewis	1,146	Steve Harmison	64
2000	Div 1	16	2	9	5	0	0	112	8th	Div 2	16	5	11	0	0	0	20	7th	R4	QF		Simon Katich	1,089	Simon Brown	56
2001	Div 2	16	3	6	7	0	0	140	8th	Div 2	16	9	4	0	0	3	42	2nd	QF	QF		Martin Love	1,364	Danny Law	40
2002	Div 2	16	1	11	4	0	0	90 3/4	9th	Div 1	16	5	11	0	0	0	20	8th	R4	Grp		Gary Pratt	713	Neil Killeen	35
2003	Div 2	16	5	7	4	0	0	159 1/4	6th	Div 2	18	7	10	0	0	1	30	7th	R4		Grp	Jonathan Lewis	1,104	Shoaib Akhtar	34
2004	Div 2	16	2	8	6	0	0	118 1/2	9th	Div 2	18	9	7	1	0	1	40	6th	R2		Grp	Gordon Muchall	970	Mark Davies	50
2005	Div 2	16	6	2	8	0	0	205	2nd	Div 2	18	12	4	1	0	1	52	2nd	R1		Grp	Dale Benkenstein	1,183	Liam Plunkett	51
2006	Div 1	16	4	8	4	0	0	153 1/2	7th	Div 1	8	2	4	0	1	1	6	8th	Grp		Grp	Dale Benkenstein	1,427	Graham Onions	50
2007	Div 1	16	7	5	4	0	0	197 1/2	2nd	Div 2	8	6	2	0	0	0	12	1st	Won		Grp	Michael Di Venuto	1,329	Ottis Gibson	80
2008	Div 1	16	6	3	6	0	1	190	1st	Div 1	8	4	3	0	0	1	9	3rd	SF		SF	Michael Di Venuto	1,058	Steve Harmison	60
2009	Div 1	16	8	0	8	0	0	240	1st	Div 1	8	4	4	0	0	0	8	6th	Grp		QF	Michael Di Venuto	1,654	Steve Harmison	51

== Key ==
Winners	Runners up	Promoted	Relegated

Division shown in bold when it changes due to promotion, relegation or league reorganisation. Top run scorer/wicket taker shown in bold when he was the leading run scorer/wicket taker in the country.

Key to league record:
Div - division played in (see opposite)
P – games played
W – games won
L – games lost
D – games drawn
NR – games with no result
Abnd – games abandoned
Pts – points
Pos – final position

Key to rounds:
RPre - preliminary round
R1 – first round
R2 – second round, etc.
QF – quarter-final
SF – semi-final
Grp – group stage
RU - runners-up
n/a – not applicable

== See also ==
- Derbyshire County Cricket Club seasons
- Kent County Cricket Club seasons
- Northamptonshire County Cricket Club seasons
