= Wilf Carter =

Wilf Carter may refer to:

- Wilf Carter (footballer) (1933–2013), English footballer
- Wilf Carter (musician) (1904–1996), also known as Montana Slim, Canadian singer-songwriter

== See also ==
- Wilfred Carter, (1896–1975) English footballer
