= Ernest Sykes (cricketer) =

English cricketer

Personal information
- Full name: Ernest Castle Sykes
- Born: 31 May 1869; Sheffield, Yorkshire, England
- Died: 30 November 1925 (aged 56); Bolsover, Derbyshire, England
- Batting: Right-handed
- Role: Wicket-keeper
- Relatives: Eric Sykes (son)

Domestic team information
- Years: Team
- 1896: Hampshire

Career statistics
Competition	First-class
Matches	1
Runs scored	5
Batting average	–
100s/50s	–/–
Top score	5*
Catches/stumpings	–/–
- Source: Cricinfo, 2 January 2010

Ernest Castle Sykes (31 May 1869 — 30 November 1925) was an English first-class cricketer.

Sykes was born at Sheffield in May 1869. He made one appearance in first-class cricket as a wicket-keeper for Hampshire against the touring Australians at Southampton in 1896. Batting twice in the match at number eleven, he made two unbeaten scores of 0 and 5. In later life, Sykes worked in the mining industry in Derbyshire, where he was employed as a traffic superintendent at Bolsover colliery. Skyes died suddenly while shaving at his Bolsover residence on 30 November 1925. His son, Eric, was also a first-class cricketer.
