= Horace Wass =

English sportsman

Personal information
- Born: 26 August 1903; Chesterfield, Derbyshire, England
- Died: 14 January 1969 (aged 65); Baulkham Hills, New South Wales, Australia
- Height: 5 ft 9.5 in (177 cm)
- Batting: Right-handed

Domestic team information
- Years: Team
- 1929: Derbyshire
- First-class debut: 24 August 1929 Derbyshire v Glamorgan

Career statistics
Competition	First-class
Matches	1
Runs scored	9
Batting average	9.00
100s/50s	–/–
Top score	9
Catches/stumpings	–/–
- Source: Cricinfo, 28 October 2022

Horace Wass (26 August 1903 – 14 January 1969) was an English sportsman, who made over 400 Football League appearances playing football for Chesterfield from 1920 to 1937 and for Southport in 1937. He also played first-class cricket for Derbyshire in 1929.

== Football ==
Wass was born in Chesterfield, Derbyshire. He started playing football with Chesterfield in 1920 as an amateur, turning professional two years later. He remained with the club until the end of the 1936–37 season. He then moved to Southport, for whom he played 20 league games. He had a trial at Gainsborough Trinity in 1938 and played for Chelmsford City in the Southern Football League.

== Cricket ==
Wass played one first-class match for Derbyshire against Glamorgan during the 1929 season, in which he played one innings to make 9 runs. Though he did not appear again for Derbyshire, he became a leading light in the days of pre-war Scottish cricket, making his first appearances during 1935, and further appearances against teams assembled by Sir Julien Cahn between 1935 and 1937. He appeared for Scotland eight times in total: twice against the South Africans, once against the Australians and five times against Sir Julien Cahn's XI. These games did not have first-class status. He was a right-handed batsman.

Wass went to Australia, where he was an active football and cricket coach with the Hills District junior teams. He was also an outstanding senior golfer based at the Monash Country Club in Sydney.

Horace Wass died of heart failure at his home in Baulkham Hills, New South Wales, at the age of 65.
