= Escott Loney =

English cricketer

Personal information
- Full name: Escott Frith Loney
- Born: 21 July 1903; Bristol, England
- Died: 19 June 1982 (aged 78); Toronto, Ontario, Canada
- Batting: Left-handed
- Bowling: Right-arm medium-fast

Domestic team information
- Years: Team
- 1925–1927: Derbyshire
- FC debut: 11 July 1925 Derbyshire v Leicestershire
- Last FC: 23 July 1927 Derbyshire v Northamptonshire

Career statistics
Competition	First-class
Matches	25
Runs scored	511
Batting average	17.03
100s/50s	0/0
Top score	39*
Balls bowled	2,022
Wickets	20
Bowling average	32.50
5 wickets in innings	0
10 wickets in match	0
Best bowling	4/27
Catches/stumpings	18/–
- Source: CricketArchive, 14 October 2011

Escott Frith Loney (21 July 1903 – 19 June 1982) was an English cricketer who played first-class cricket for Derbyshire between 1925 and 1927.

== Life ==
Born in Bristol, Loney made his debut for Derbyshire in the 1925 season in July against Leicestershire with modest scores, a few overs bowling and catching the opening batsman. He played six matches for the club in 1925 with a season's best bowling of 4 for 35 against Glamorgan . In the 1926 season he played six matches with his top score of 39 not out against Warwickshire and his best bowling of 4 for 27 against Somerset. He played more matches in the 1927 season although he bowled less without taking a wicket. Loney was a left-hand batsman who played 37 innings in 25 first-class matches with an average of 17.03 and a top score of 39 not out. He was a right-arm medium-fast bowler and took 20 wickets for an average of 32.50 and a best performance of 4 for 27.

By 1933 Loney had moved to Toronto in Canada, and subsequently performed in various miscellaneous matches for Canadian sides. He played a match for Toronto Cricket Club against Sir Julian Cahn's XI in 1933. In 1936 he toured England with R C Matthews' XI and he played three matches for different Canadian sides in 1937. In 1951 at the age of 48 he opened the batting in a match for Toronto against Marylebone Cricket Club (MCC) scoring 58.

Loney died at Toronto, Ontario, Canada at the age of 78. He is buried in York Cemetery.
