= Anthony Mather-Jackson =

English colliery owner, manufacturer, and cricketer

Sir Anthony Henry Mather-Jackson, 6th Baronet (9 November 1899 – 11 October 1983) was an English colliery owner and manufacturer. He was an all-round cricketer who played for Derbyshire from 1920 to 1927.

Jackson was born in Westminster, the son of William Mather-Jackson and his wife Georgina Hallowes. He was educated at Harrow School, playing in the first XI in 1916 and 1917. He joined the Grenadier Guards.

Jackson started his Derbyshire cricket career in the 1920 season, making his debut for Derbyshire against Nottinghamshire, and playing one further match in what was a very unsuccessful season for Derbyshire. He next played a full season in the 1922 season, scoring two half-centuries, including a career-best 75 against Leicestershire when with Wilfred Carter made a 182 eighth-wicket partnership, a record for the county which still stands today. He played regularly in the 1923, 1924 and 1925 seasons. In the 1926 season he took 5 wickets for 84 against Essex and finished the season with all three of his career half-centuries to his credit. He played regularly but without significant impact in the 1927 season, which was his last. He was a right-handed batsman and played 96 innings in 64 first-class matches. His top score was 75 and his average 14.80. He was a right-arm medium-fast bowler and took 44 wickets at an average of 29.75 and a best performance of 5-84.

Jackson was managing director of Newstead Collieries, and a Director of many other colliery and manufacturing companies in Nottinghamshire Derbyshire. He was J.P. for Nottinghamshire in 1938 and Deputy Lieutenant in 1942.

In 1976 Mather-Jackson inherited the Jackson baronetcy from his brother.

Jackson died in Kirklington aged 84 and the title passed to his second cousin, the descendant of the second son of the first baronet

Jackson married Evelyn Stephenson, daughter of Sir Henry Stephenson, 1st Baronet and had three daughters. Two of Jackson's cousins, Geoffrey Jackson and Guy Jackson also played first-class cricket for Derbyshire, the latter being club captain for eight years.

Children:
Elizabeth Georgiana Mather Mather-Jackson d. 23 Sep 2011 m. Weetman Pearson, 3rd Viscount Cowdray
Angela Mary Mather-Jackson b. 1925, d. 16 Feb 2021 m. Francis Ambrose More O'Ferrall
Sarah Gillian Mather Mather-Jackson b. 1929, d. 21 Sep 2018 m. Henry Lester Louis Morriss

Baronetage of the United Kingdom
Preceded by George Mather-Jackson	Baronet (of The Manor House); 1976–1983	Succeeded by William Mather-Jackson
