= William Parrington =

English cricketer

Personal information
- Full name: William Ferguson Parrington
- Born: 1 November 1889; Southwick, Sunderland, England
- Died: 7 May 1980 (aged 90); Northallerton, England
- Batting: Right-handed
- Bowling: Right-arm medium

Domestic team information
- Years: Team
- 1926: Derbyshire
- FC debut: 22 May 1926 Derbyshire v Warwickshire
- Last FC: 3 July 1926 Derbyshire v Glamorgan

Career statistics
Competition	First-class
Matches	6
Runs scored	148
Batting average	14.80
100s/50s	0/0
Top score	47
Catches/stumpings	1/–
- Source: CricketArchive, February 2012

William Ferguson Parrington (1 November 1889 – 7 May 1980) was an English cricketer who played first-class cricket for Derbyshire in 1926.

== Life ==
Parrington was born in Southwick, Sunderland, County Durham, the son of Matthew William Parrington, a mining engineer, and his wife Marion Ferguson. In 1914, he played one match in the Minor Counties Championship for Durham. Twelve years later in the 1926 season, he made his debut in for Derbyshire in May in a match against Warwickshire. In the second innings of this match, Parrington hit his career-best score of 47. He made occasional good stands among some fairly indifferent scores in the remaining five matches in which he played. Parrington was a right-handed batsman and played 11 innings in 6 first-class matches with an average of 14.80 and a top score of 47. He was a right-arm medium-pace bowler but did not bowl a ball in first-class cricket.

Parrington died in Northallerton at the age of 90. Parrington's brothers, Tom and Henry, both played Minor Counties cricket for Durham between 1901 and 1905.
