= Garnet Lee =

English cricketer (1887–1976)

Personal information
- Full name: Garnet Morley Lee
- Born: 7 June 1887; Calverton, Nottinghamshire, England
- Died: 29 February 1976 (aged 88); Newark-on-Trent, England
- Batting: Right-handed
- Bowling: Leg break, googly
- Role: All-rounder

Domestic team information
- Years: Team
- 1910–1922: Nottinghamshire
- 1925–1933: Derbyshire
- FC debut: 21 July 1910 Notts v Sussex
- Last FC: 30 August 1933 Derbyshire v Lancashire

Umpiring information
- FC umpired: 187 (1935–1949)

Career statistics
Competition	First-class
Matches	373
Runs scored	14,858
Batting average	25.75
100s/50s	22/60
Top score	200*
Balls bowled	24,782
Wickets	397
Bowling average	28.04
5 wickets in innings	19
10 wickets in match	1
Best bowling	7/67
Catches/stumpings	157/–
- Source: CricketArchive (subscription required), 24 October 2021

Garnet Morley Lee (7 June 1887 – 29 February 1976) was an English cricketer who played first-class cricket for Nottinghamshire between 1910 and 1922 and for Derbyshire between 1925 and 1933. He scored nearly 15,000 runs in his first-class career.

Lee was born at Calverton, Nottinghamshire. He joined the Nottinghamshire staff in 1905. and started playing for Nottinghamshire second XI in 1909. Towards the end of the 1910 season, he progressed to the county team making his debut in July against Sussex in a match where he scored a duck and did not bowl. He played four first-class games in 1910. He played for the full season in 1911 without any spectacular performances, but in 1912 started to find batting form. In 1913 he scored 180 against Sussex and 200 not out in five hours against Leicestershire making this the only year he scored more than 1000 runs for Nottinghamshire. In 1914 he made 108 against Sussex and 126 against Marylebone Cricket Club (MCC). After the break caused by World War I he played a full season in 1919 with 158 against Leicestershire. His batting form dropped in 1920 and 1921 but his bowling came to the fore in 1921 when he to 6 for 68 against Yorkshire. In 1922 Lee dropped out of the game for the middle part of the season, but scored 100 not out against Surrey. He lost his place with the team and stopped playing at the end of the season.

Lee joined Derbyshire in 1923, but spent two years qualifying. He started playing first-class cricket for the club in the 1925 season and also became far more active as a bowler. He made more than 1000 runs for Derbyshire in his first year, scoring 119 against Warwickshire and 113 against Somerset. In the 1926 season he scored 191 against Kent in one match and took 5 wickets for 87 in another. He also took 5 for 57 against Leicestershire, 5 for 59 against Gloucestershire and 6 for 74 against Warwickshire. In the 1927 season Lee achieved 5 for 41 against Northamptonshire, 5 for 25 against Glamorgan, and 6 for 34 against Somerset. However his most spectacular career performance was in the August match against Northamptonshire which he won almost singlehanded with a score of 100 not out, 7 wickets for 78 in the first innings and 5 for 65 in the second innings. No comparable performance was achieved at the club until Jonathan Clare achieved a century and 7 wickets in 2008.

In 1928 Lee wintered in Jamaica playing for L H Tennyson's XI. In the 1928 season, Lee scored 155 against Northamptonshire, 107 against Leicestershire, and 100 against Kent. He took 6 wickets for 44 against Glamorgan, 5 for 99 against Worcestershire, 5 for 48 against Oxford University and 5 for 57 against Northamptonshire. In the 1929 season he scored 134 against Hampshire, 113 against Essex and 118 against Somerset, but his best bowling was 5 for 111 against Nottinghamshire. Lee had a bad run in the 1930 season but returned to scoring in the 1931 season with 173 and 141 against Northamptonshire and 147 against Essex. In the 1932 season he scored 130 against Essex in one match and achieved his best bowling performance of 7 for 67 in the other. He played his final season in 1933 with 107 against Leicestershire and 128 against Northamptonshire.

Lee was a right-hand batsman and played 624 innings in 373 first-class matches with a top score of 200 not out and an average of 25.75. He scored 22 centuries. He was a leg-break and googly bowler and took 397 first-class wickets at an average of 28.04 and a best performance of 7 for 67.

Lee umpired first-class matches regularly from 1935 to 1949. He coached at Repton School from 1941 to 1945 when Lionel Blaxland was in charge of cricket and Donald Carr became one of the best schoolboy cricketers of all time. Lee was the licensee of the Traveller's Rest pub in Draycott before retiring to Calverton with his wife in 1954.

Lee died at Hawtonville, Newark, Nottinghamshire at the age of 88.
