= Herbert Slater =

English cricketer

Personal information
- Full name: Herbert Slater
- Born: 11 November 1881; Langley Mill, Derbyshire, England
- Died: 2 December 1958 (aged 77); Cresswell, Derbyshire, England
- Batting: Right-handed
- Bowling: Right-arm off break; Right-arm medium-fast
- Relatives: Henry Slater (father); Archibald Slater (brother)

Domestic team information
- Years: Team
- 1907: Derbyshire
- FC debut: 11 July 1907 Derbyshire v Nottinghamshire
- Last FC: 1 August 1907 Derbyshire v Sussex

Career statistics
Competition	First-class
Matches	5
Runs scored	39
Batting average	5.57
100s/50s	0/0
Top score	21
Balls bowled	78
Wickets	2
Bowling average	19.00
5 wickets in innings	0
10 wickets in match	0
Best bowling	2/15
Catches/stumpings	0/–
- Source: CricketArchive, July 2012

Herbert Slater (11 November 1881 – 2 December 1958) was an English cricketer who played for Derbyshire in 1907.

Slater was born in Langley Mill the son of Henry Slater and his wife Sarah Bestwick His father had played for Derbyshire between 1882 and 1887.

Slater made his debut for the Derbyshire team in the 1907 season against Nottinghamshire in July. He opened the batting with captain Levi Wright and scored 21 in his first innings. In the next match against Leicestershire Slater took 2-15, his only wickets in his career. In his remaining matches his performance was indifferent.

Slater was a right-handed batsman and played 9 innings in 5 first-class matches with a top score of 21 and an average of 5.57. He was a right-arm off-break and fast-medium bowler and took 2 wickets with an average of 19.00. He was described as "A good batsman and an excellent fielder". He scored many runs playing club cricket.

Slater died in Creswell at the age of 77. Slater's brother, Archibald Slater also played cricket for Derbyshire.
