= George Beet (cricketer, born 1904) =

English cricketer

Personal information
- Full name: George Hector Cook Beet
- Born: 30 May 1904; Somercotes. Derbyshire, England
- Died: 21 August 1949 (aged 45); Somercotes, Derbyshire, England
- Batting: Right-handed
- Role: Occasional wicket-keeper
- Relatives: George Beet senior Gordon Beet

Domestic team information
- Years: Team
- 1928–1932: Derbyshire
- FC debut: 21 July 1928 Derbyshire v Kent
- Last FC: 18 June 1938 MCC v Oxford University

Umpiring information
- FC umpired: 1 (1947)

Career statistics
Competition	First-class
Matches	11
Runs scored	277
Batting average	16.29
100s/50s	0/0
Top score	61
Catches/stumpings	14/2
- Source: CricketArchive, 5 July 2013

George Hector Cook Beet (30 May 1904 – 21 August 1949) was an English cricketer who played first-class cricket for Derbyshire in 1928 and in 1932 and for Marylebone Cricket Club in 1928 and between 1933 and 1938.

Beet was born at Somercotes, the son of George Beet who had kept wicket for Derbyshire before the First World War. Beet was playing for MCC in 1926 and also played for Young Professionals that year. He made his first-class debut appearance for Derbyshire in the 1928 season when he acted as a stand-in wicket-keeper against Kent and achieved three catches and a stumping. He also kept wicket for MCC against Kent later in the season. He re-appeared for Derbyshire in the 1932 season in four matches as a batsman rather than a wicket-keeper. He played in the middle-order and generally his score was in double figures. He achieved his best performance for Derbyshire with a score of 35 not out. He played once for Derbyshire second XI in 1933.

Beet continued playing first for Marylebone Cricket Club in first-class and other games. He played one first-class match in 1933, two in 1934, one in 1936 and one in 1938. He kept wicket in all except for one of the matches in 1934.

Beet was a right-handed batsman who played 19 innings in 11 first-class matches with an average of 16.29 and a top score of 61. He was an occasional wicket keeper and took 14 catches and 2 stumpings.

Beet was an umpire at Lord's Cricket Ground in 1947 when he umpired mainly schools matches but also one first-class match.

Beet died at Somercotes at the age of 45. His nephew Gordon Beet was also a Derbyshire cricketer.
