= Wilfred Shardlow =

English cricketer

Personal information
- Full name: Wilfred Shardlow
- Born: 30 September 1902; Clowne, Derbyshire, England
- Died: 21 June 1956 (aged 53); Burton-upon-Trent, England
- Batting: Left-handed
- Bowling: Right-arm fast-medium

Domestic team information
- Years: Team
- 1925–1928: Derbyshire
- FC debut: 1 July 1925 Derbyshire v Yorkshire
- Last FC: 11 July 1928 Derbyshire v Yorkshire

Career statistics
Competition	First-class
Matches	38
Runs scored	201
Batting average	7.17
100s/50s	0/0
Top score	39*
Balls bowled	4,640
Wickets	56
Bowling average	34.62
5 wickets in innings	1
10 wickets in match	0
Best bowling	5/41
Catches/stumpings	16/–
- Source: CricketArchive, February 2012

Wilfred Shardlow (30 September 1902 – 21 June 1956) was an English cricketer who played for Derbyshire between 1925 and 1928.

== Career ==
Shardlow was born at Clowne, Derbyshire. He made his debut for Derbyshire in the 1925 season in July against Yorkshire where he made 11 in his first innings. He played two more matches that year and played fully in the 1926 and 1927 season. In 1927 he achieved 5-41 bowling against Glamorgan and made his top score of 39 not out against Kent. He only played four matches in the 1928 season which was his last first-class season. He was a right-arm fast-medium bowler who took 56 first-class wickets with an average of 34.62 and a best performance of 5-41. As a left-hand batsman he played 42 innings in 38 matches with a top score of 39 and an average of 7.17.

Shardlow was still playing cricket in 1955 when he appeared in match for Bass Worthington. He died the following year at Burton-on-Trent, Staffordshire at the age of 54.
