= Henry Slater (cricketer, born 1855) =

English cricketer

Personal information
- Full name: Henry Slater
- Born: 23 February 1855; Heanor, Derbyshire, England
- Died: 20 November 1916 (aged 61); Worksop, Nottinghamshire, England
- Batting: Right-handed
- Bowling: Right-arm medium
- Relatives: Herbert Slater (son); Archibald Slater (son)

Domestic team information
- Years: Team
- 1882–1887: Derbyshire
- FC debut: 26 June 1882 Derbyshire v Lancashire
- Last FC: 28 July 1889 Derbyshire v Surrey

Career statistics
Competition	First-class
Matches	6
Runs scored	22
Batting average	3.66
100s/50s	0/0
Top score	11
Balls bowled	444
Wickets	3
Bowling average	61.66
5 wickets in innings	0
10 wickets in match	0
Best bowling	1/35
Catches/stumpings	2/–
- Source: CricketArchive, 22 June 2011

Henry Slater (23 February 1855 – 20 November 1916) was an English cricketer who played for Derbyshire between 1882 and 1887.

Slater was born at Heanor, Derbyshire the son of James Slater and his wife Elizabeth Baimbridge. He became a coal miner.

He made his cricket debut for Derbyshire in the 1882 season in June against Lancashire in which he took a wicket but scored no runs. His next game was against Nottinghamshire in the 1885 season when again he took a wicket. In the 1886 season he played against MCC and took two catches. He played two first-class games in the 1887 season and took a wicket against Lancashire. He also played two non-status matches that season in one of which he scored 54, a contrast to the low single figures he managed in most of his games Slater was a right-hand batsman and played 9 innings in five first-class matches with a top score of 21 and an average of 5.57. He was a right-arm medium pace bowler and took 3 wickets with an average of 61.66.

Slater married Sarah Ann Bestwick on 28 December 1878. Their sons Herbert Slater and Archibald Slater both played for Derbyshire. Slater died at Worksop, Nottinghamshire at the age of 61.
