= Gordon Beet =

English cricketer

Personal information
- Full name: Gordon Albert Beet
- Born: 5 May 1939; Heanor, Derbyshire, England
- Died: 19 January 1994 (aged 54); Mansfield, England
- Batting: Right-handed
- Bowling: Left-arm slow
- Relatives: George Beet, Sr. George Beet, Jr.

Domestic team information
- Years: Team
- 1956–1961: Derbyshire
- FC debut: 30 May 1956 Derbyshire v Kent
- Last FC: 24 June 1961 Derbyshire v Oxford University

Career statistics
Competition	First-class
Matches	6
Runs scored	36
Batting average	7.20
100s/50s	0/0
Top score	17
Balls bowled	144
Wickets	2
Bowling average	50.00
5 wickets in innings	0
10 wickets in match	0
Best bowling	1/42
Catches/stumpings	3/–
- Source: CricketArchive, December 2011

Gordon Albert Beet (5 May 1939 – 19 January 1994) was an English cricketer who played first-class cricket for Derbyshire County Cricket Club between 1956 and 1961.

Beet was born at Heanor, Derbyshire. He started representing Derbyshire in the Minor Counties Championship in 1955, and played most of his matches for the second XI. He made two first-class appearances for Derbyshire in the 1956 season with his debut against Kent when he made 4 runs in the only innings he played. His next first-class appearance was in a single match in the 1958 season. Three years later in the 1961 season, he played in two County Championship games and a match against Oxford University.

Beet was a right-handed batsman and played seven innings in six first-class matches with an average of 7.20 and a top score of 17. He was a slow left-arm bowler and took two first-class wickets for 100 runs.

Beet died at Mansfield, Nottinghamshire at the age of 54. His grandfather, George Beet, Sr. and uncle George Beet, Jr. also played first-class cricket for Derbyshire.
