= Joseph Cresswell =

English cricketer

Joseph Cresswell (22 December 1865 – 19 July 1932) was an English cricketer who played first-class cricket for Warwickshire from 1895 to 1899.

Cresswell was born at Denby, Derbyshire, the son of Joseph Cresswell a beer house keeper and his wife Sarah Ann. He joined Warwickshire in 1889 and until 1893 played regularly in matches that were not accorded first-class status. He made his first-class debut in May 1895 in a match against Surrey when he took three wickets. He played a few games each season until 1899. He achieved his best bowling performance of 6 for 69 against Kent in 1896.

Cresswell played 22 innings in 15 first-class matches with an average of 10.53 and a top score of 16. He took 42 first-class wickets at an average of 27.23 and a best performance of 6 for 69.

Cresswell died at Birmingham at the age of 66. His nephew James Cresswell played cricket for Derbyshire.
