= James Cresswell =

English cricketer

Personal information
- Full name: James Arthur Cresswell
- Born: 16 March 1903; Marehay, Derbyshire, England
- Died: 2 December 1994 (aged 91); Allenton, Derbyshire, England
- Batting: Right-handed
- Bowling: Left-arm medium-fast
- Relatives: Joseph Cresswell (uncle)

Domestic team information
- Years: Team
- 1923–1927: Derbyshire
- FC debut: 22 August 1923 Derbyshire v Leicestershire
- Last FC: 13 August 1927 Derbyshire v New Zealanders

Career statistics
Competition	First-class
Matches	21
Runs scored	160
Batting average	7.61
100s/50s	0/0
Top score	28
Balls bowled	2,250
Wickets	25
Bowling average	40.88
5 wickets in innings	0
10 wickets in match	0
Best bowling	4/65
Catches/stumpings	17/–
- Source: CricketArchive, October 2011

James Arthur Cresswell (16 March 1903 – 2 December 1994) was an English cricketer who played first-class cricket for Derbyshire from 1923 to 1927.

Cresswell was born at Marehay, Derbyshire. He made his debut for Derbyshire in his only game the 1923 season against Leicestershire, when he took two wickets. He played two games in the 1924 season and five in the 1925 season when he achieved his best bowling performance of 4 for 65 against Lancashire. In the 1926 season he played his most games in the season with nine matches. In the 1927 season, his last, he played four matches and managed his top score of 28 against Yorkshire.

Cresswell was a right-hand batsman and played 34 innings in 21 first-class matches with a top score of 28 and an average of 7.61. He was a left-arm fast-medium bowler and took 25 first-class wickets at an average of 40.88 and a best performance of 4 for 65. In 1939 he played for Derbyshire Second XI and also for Alfreton colliery team.

Cresswell later became a policeman. He died at Allenton, Derbyshire at the age of 91. His uncle Joseph Cresswell played for Warwickshire.
