= Cecil Tate =

English cricketer

Personal information
- Full name: Cecil Frederick Tate
- Born: 1 May 1908; Gillingham, Kent, England
- Died: 7 August 1997 (aged 89); Burton-upon-Trent, England
- Batting: Right-handed
- Bowling: Left-arm slow
- Relatives: Fred Tate (father); Maurice Tate (brother)

Domestic team information
- Years: Team
- 1928: Derbyshire
- 1931–1933: Warwickshire
- FC debut: 2 June 1928 Derbyshire v Essex
- Last FC: 2 August 1933 Warwickshire v Worcestershire

Career statistics
Competition	First-class
Matches	11
Runs scored	82
Batting average	9.11
100s/50s	0/0
Top score	21
Balls bowled	1,008
Wickets	8
Bowling average	51.12
5 wickets in innings	0
10 wickets in match	0
Best bowling	3/65
Catches/stumpings	5/–
- Source: CricketArchive, February 2012

Cecil Frederick Tate (1 May 1908 – 7 August 1997) was an English cricketer who played for Derbyshire in 1928 and for Warwickshire from 1931 to 1933.

Tate was born at Gillingham, Kent, the son of Fred Tate who represented England in one Test in 1902. His father became coach for Derbyshire and Tate played for Derbyshire in the 1928 season. His debut match was against Essex, when he made his top score of 21 in a drawn match. He played in another draw and two wins so he only played one innings in each match totalling 48 runs in the season. He took two wickets.

Tate did not play first-class cricket again until 1931, when he joined Warwickshire. He played 6 first-class matches in the season, and then played a last match in 1933. He batted at the tail end for Warwickshire and made fewer runs in 8 innings than he did in four for Derbyshire. However his bowling rating was higher. He also played for the second XI in those two years.

Tate was a right-handed batsman and played 12 innings in 11 first-class matches with an average of 9.11 and a top score of 21. He was a left-arm slow bowler and took 8 first-class wickets at an average of 51.12 and a best performance of 3 for 65.

Tate died at Burton upon Trent at the age of 89. His brother, Maurice Tate had an eleven-year Test career, along with 25 years of service at Sussex.
