= Henry Jordan (cricketer) =

English cricketer and Indian Army officer

Personal information
- Full name: Henry Guy Bowen Jordan
- Born: 10 June 1898; Fairfield, Derbyshire, England
- Died: 5 October 1981 (aged 83); Tonbridge, Kent, England
- Batting: Right-handed

Domestic team information
- Years: Team
- 1926: Derbyshire
- Only FC: 5 June 1926 Derbyshire v Essex

Career statistics
Competition	First-class
Matches	1
Runs scored	0
Batting average	0.00
100s/50s	0/0
Top score	0
Catches/stumpings	0/–
- Source: CricketArchive, February 2012

Henry Guy Bowen Jordan (10 June 1898 – 5 October 1981) was an English officer in the Indian Army and a cricketer who played first-class cricket for Derbyshire in 1926.

Jordan was born in Fairfield, Derbyshire and was educated at Marlborough College where he played cricket in the 1st XI from 1914 to 1916. He played one match for Derbyshire in the 1926 season, a County Championship match against Essex. He was a right-handed batsman and failed to score in either innings the match.

Jordan was commissioned a temporary second lieutenant in the Reserve Regiment of Cavalry 29 June 1917. He was transferred to the General List for service with the Indian Army (on probation) on 6 November 1918 as a second lieutenant with seniority 29 June 1917. On 26 January 1919 he was attached to the 32nd Lancers on probation. He was appointed quartermaster 16 May 1919, then Adjutant 28 September 1919. He received a permanent commission as a second lieutenant with amended seniority as of 29 March 1918 and Lieutenant 29 March 1919 into the Indian Army 12 January 1920. He would later have his seniority as a second lieutenant restored to 29 June 1917.

For most of 1921 he was attached to the Cavalry School at Saugor in India, then he was then permanently posted to the 3rd Cavalry from 1 September 1921 and was promoted Captain 13 February 1923. He was appointed Adjutant of the Northern Bengal Mounted Rifles, Auxiliary Force, India from 30 June 1929 to 30 September 1932. He was transferred to the Special Unemployed List in November 1935.

He was recalled for service with the Indian Army during World War Two in India, initially as the Station Staff Officer, Jhansi, later on the staff and by 1945 with the Army Remount Department. He was promoted major on 3 September 1939 with seniority of 16 December 1938.

After retiring from the Indian Army on 9 August 1947 a major, he was commissioned in the Territorial Army, General List as a second lieutenant then captain on 15 February 1952 and served until March 1956.

Jordan died in hospital at Tonbridge Kent at the age of 82.
