= James Horsley (cricketer) =

English cricketer (1890–1976)

Personal information
- Full name: James Horsley
- Born: 4 January 1890; Melbourne, Derbyshire, England
- Died: 13 February 1976 (aged 86); Derby, England
- Batting: Right-handed
- Bowling: Right-arm medium-fast
- Relatives: John Young

Domestic team information
- Years: Team
- 1913: Nottinghamshire
- 1914–1925: Derbyshire
- FC debut: 5 June 1913 Nottinghamshire v Yorkshire
- Last FC: 29 July 1925 Derbyshire v Essex

Career statistics
Competition	First-class
Matches	67
Runs scored	1,367
Batting average	13.67
100s/50s	0/3
Top score	66
Balls bowled	12,633
Wickets	267
Bowling average	20.26
5 wickets in innings	19
10 wickets in match	3
Best bowling	7/48
Catches/stumpings	45/–
- Source: CricketArchive, 13 July 2010

James Horsley (4 January 1890 – 13 February 1976) was an English cricketer who played first-class cricket for Nottinghamshire in 1913 and for Derbyshire from 1914 to 1925

Horsley was born at Melbourne, Derbyshire. He made his first-class debut for Nottinghamshire in June 1913 against Yorkshire, when he took 2 wickets in the first innings, but never had the chance to bat. He managed three no balls and two wides in the match. In his second match against Hampshire he was stumped for a duck, took no wickets, and bowled four wides. He played one more match for Nottinghamshire against Middlesex, when he took a wicket but gave away no extras.

In 1914 Horsley switched to his native county Derbyshire and played a full pre-war season. He managed five five-wicket innings against Somerset, Yorkshire with 6 for 77, Northamptonshire, Leicestershire with a spectacular 6 for 17, and Worcestershire. Against Essex he bowled and in return was bowled by Johnny Douglas and in the Leicestershire match had a match haul of 10 wickets. Cricket was then interrupted by World War I, but he was back in the 1919 season with three 5 wicket innings, in one of which, he took 6 for 78 for Yorkshire. He then took 6 for 55 and 6 for 62, including a hat-trick, in a match against the Australian Imperial Forces XI giving him a match total of 12 wickets. This win by 36 runs was the only victory achieved by a county team against the Australians during their tour. Horsley was able to capitalise on the absence in the match of Billy Bestwick who had returned to bowl for Derbyshire that season. In Derbyshire's low season of 1920 Horsley played just one match and did not play at all in 1921 and 1922 when he played some games in the Lancashire League for Burnley. In the 1923 season he was back with Derbyshire and for the remainder of the career he was sharing the bowling with two of Derbyshire's best bowlers, Bestwick and Arthur Morton. His best season was 1923 with seven 5-wicket innings and an average of 16.17. He took 7 for 48 in the initial game against Warwickshire, 6 for 29 against Northamptonshire – a 10 wicket match, 5 for 40 and 5 for 48 in a match against Somerset, 5 for 58 against Glamorgan, 5 for 69 against Yorkshire and 6 for49 against Leicestershire. In the 1924 season he took 6 for 42 against Yorkshire. In his last season of 1925 he took 6 for 94 against Gloucestershire, 6 for 66 against Essex and 5 for 36 against Kent.

Horsley was a right-arm fast-medium bowler and took 287 wickets at an average of 20.26 and a best performance of 7–48 with nineteen 5-wicket innings and three 10-wicket matches. He was a right-hand batsman and played 132 innings in 87 first-class matches with an average of 13.67 and a top score of 66.

Horsley returned to Lancashire League cricket and then spent two summers with Aberdeenshire. He became a professional for several clubs in Northern Ireland until the Second World War.

Horsley died at Derby at the age of 86.

Horsley married May Straw at Nottingham in 1911. He was related to J H Young who played for Derbyshire between 1899 and 1901.
