= Geoffrey Jackson (cricketer) =

English cricketer

Personal information
- Full name: Geoffrey Laird Jackson
- Born: 10 January 1894; Birkenhead, Cheshire, England
- Died: 9 April 1917 (aged 23); Fampoux, Arras, France
- Batting: Right-handed
- Bowling: Right-arm medium
- Relatives: Guy Jackson (brother); Anthony Jackson (cousin)

Domestic team information
- Years: Team
- 1912–1914: Derbyshire
- 1914: Oxford University
- FC debut: 26 August 1912 Derbyshire v Nottinghamshire
- Last FC: 27 June 1914 Derbyshire v Somerset

Career statistics
Competition	First-class
Matches	7
Runs scored	150
Batting average	12.50
100s/50s	0/1
Top score	50
Balls bowled	426
Wickets	10
Bowling average	23.80
5 wickets in innings	0
10 wickets in match	0
Best bowling	3/52
Catches/stumpings	4/–
- Source: CricketArchive, December 2011

Geoffrey Laird Jackson (10 January 1894 – 9 April 1917) was an English cricketer who played for Derbyshire from 1912 to 1914, and for Oxford University in 1914. He died of wounds in World War I.

Jackson was born at Birkenhead, Cheshire, the eldest son of Brigadier General Geoffrey M. Jackson and of his wife Jessie C. C. Jackson. His father commanded the Sherwood Foresters and was managing director of the Clay Cross Colliery Company. Jackson was educated at Harrow School and was in the cricket XI in 1911, 1912 and 1913, being captain in the last year. While still at school he played first-class cricket for Derbyshire. He made his debut in August 1912 against Nottinghamshire: he took a wicket and two catches and scored 2 in the only innings he played. He played two matches for Derbyshire in 1913.

Jackson then went to Balliol College, Oxford and appeared in three first-class matches for the university in 1914. He played one county championship match for Derbyshire in 1914 before the First World War in which he lost his life.

Jackson was a right-hand batsman and played twelve innings in seven first-class matches with an average of 12.50 and a top score of 50. He was a right-arm medium pace bowler and took 10 first-class wickets at an average of 23.80 and a best performance of 3 for 52.

Jackson was given a commission in the Rifle Brigade on the outbreak of World War I and went to France in October, 1914. He was invalided home, after the Second Battle of Ypres, suffering from gas poisoning and spent some months in England serving his Reserve Battalion. He returned to France, as Adjutant of the 1st Battalion, in December, 1915, and was mentioned in despatches on 1 January 1916. He served continuously until his death on 9 April 1917 at the Battle of Arras. He was mortally wounded by a piece of shell after advancing about 6000 yards, and died at Fampoux, Arras, France before reaching the dressing station.

Jackson's brother Guy Jackson and cousin Anthony Jackson also played cricket for Derbyshire.
