= William Tomlinson =

English cricketer and schoolmaster

William James Vincent Tomlinson (10 August 1901 – 16 May 1984) was an English schoolmaster and cricketer who played first-class cricket for Derbyshire and Cambridge University from 1920 to 1924.

Tomlinson was born at Winshill, Derbyshire the son of Robert George Tomlinson and his wife Christiana Gibson Bowie. His father was a director of Salt's Brewery in Burton-on-Trent and had also played cricket for Derbyshire. He was educated at Felsted School and Emmanuel College, Cambridge.

Tomlinson made his first-class debut for Derbyshire in August 1920 when he bowled 5-53 against Sussex, taking the wickets of Harold and Arthur Gilligan and Maurice Tate. However that was to remain his best performance. He played three more games in the season when Derbyshire failed to win a match. He played six games in 1921 when under Guy Jackson the team moved up to 12th in the Championship. In 1922 he played two games for Cambridge University and twelve games for Derbyshire who reached 11th in the championship, accompanying Wilfred Hill-Wood in both teams. In 1923 he played two games for Derbyshire and ten for Cambridge University culminating in the Varsity match which that year, was nicknamed the "Thunderstorm match". Oxford ran up a high score before overnight storms created a very sticky wicket and the Cambridge team which included Gubby Allen and Claude Ashton were quickly dismissed in two innings. Tomlinson played one game for Derbyshire in 1924 and then stayed with club cricket. He was a right-arm medium pace bowler and took 58 first-class wickets with an average of 32.24 and a best performance of 5-53. He was a right-hand batsman and played 65 innings in 38 first-class matches with a top score of 66 and an average of 14.94.

After university, Tomlinson joined the teaching staff of St Cyprian's School preparatory school in Eastbourne and played club cricket for Free Foresters, Eastbourne, and for the school's St Cyprian's Cygnets team comprising staff, parents, old boys and friends. In 1933 he married Rosemary Vaughan Wilkes, the eldest daughter of the proprietors and in 1936 succeeded his father-in-law as headmaster. In 1939 the school buildings in Eastbourne were burnt down, and the school decamped to Midhurst, until the premises were requisitioned by the army in 1940. After a period in Gloucestershire, the school joined Summer Fields School in Oxford. In 1948 Tomlinson took a headmastership again at Norwich at Langley Junior School. He retired to Elsing, Norfolk where he died aged 82.

Tomlinson's sister Wanda married Keith Bullen a schoolmaster and poet in Cairo and founded Manor House School in Egypt.
