= Eric Sykes (cricketer) =

English cricketer

Personal information
- Born: 23 June 1906; Bolsover, Derbyshire, England
- Died: 7 December 1989 (aged 83); Barnsley, Yorkshire, England
- Batting: Right-handed

Domestic team information
- Years: Team
- 1925–1932: Derbyshire
- FC debut: 6 June 1925 Derbyshire v Gloucestershire
- Last FC: 6 August 1932 Derbyshire v Yorkshire

Career statistics
Competition	First-class
Matches	5
Runs scored	105
Batting average	11.66
100s/50s	0/1
Top score	50
Balls bowled	6
Wickets	0
Bowling average	–
5 wickets in innings	–
10 wickets in match	–
Best bowling	–
Catches/stumpings	0/–
- Source: CricketArchive, January 2012

Eric Sykes (23 June 1906 – 7 December 1989) was an English cricketer who played for Derbyshire in 1925 and 1932.

Sykes was born in Bolsover, the son of Ernest Sykes who had played cricket for Hampshire. Sykes made his first-class debut for Derbyshire in the 1925 season in June against Gloucestershire and made 50 in his first innings. In his next match he was at the wicket on 4 when Derbyshire won, but he made little impression in his last match of the season against Lancashire.

Sykes turned professional after playing as an amateur, but did not get a chance to play as a professional for Derbyshire until the 1932 season. He then played two matches for Derbyshire and made 27 in the first of them. Sykes was a right-handed batsman and played 10 innings in 5 first-class matches with an average of 11.66 and a top score of 50. He bowled one over at the cost of 2 runs without taking a wicket.

Sykes died in Athersley North, Barnsley, Yorkshire, at the age of 83.
