= Lionel Blaxland =

English flying ace and cricketer (1898–1976)

Personal information
- Full name: Lionel Bruce Blaxland
- Born: 25 March 1898; Lilleshall, Shropshire
- Died: 29 April 1976 (aged 78); Temple Ewell, Kent
- Batting: Right-handed
- Bowling: Right-arm fast-medium

Domestic team information
- Years: Team
- 1925 –1947: Derbyshire

Career statistics
Competition	First-class
Matches	19
Runs scored	483
Batting average	16.10
100s/50s	0/2
Top score	64
Balls bowled	66
Wickets	0
Bowling average	–
5 wickets in innings	–
10 wickets in match	–
Best bowling	0/1
Catches/stumpings	0/–
- Source: CricketArchive, 6 February 2010

Lionel Bruce Blaxland (25 March 1898 – 29 April 1976) was an English First World War flying ace, cricketer, schoolmaster and clergyman. He played first-class cricket intermittently for Derbyshire between 1925 and 1947.

Blaxland was born in Lilleshall, Shropshire and was educated at Shrewsbury School where he was in the cricket XI from 1914 to 1916. During World War I, he was a lieutenant flying with 40 Squadron RFC. After the war he attended the University of Oxford, where he played at wing half for Oxford University in 1920-21 and also played for The Corinthians. He became a master at Repton School in 1922 where he was in charge of cricket for eleven years.

Blaxland made his debut for Derbyshire in the 1925 season, in August in a match against Northamptonshire. He played two more matches in 1925 and did not return to Derbyshire until the 1932 season. He was primarily a club cricketer and played mostly for The Friars and other club sides. He played for Derbyshire only in the month of August, during school holidays, between 1932 and 1935. His best score was 64 against Warwickshire in the 1933 season.

After the Second World War, in the 1947 season, Blaxland reappeared for Derbyshire in his final first-class match, against the South Africans, when he led the side and kept wickets. His career finished when he lost an eye playing for The Cryptics in Portugal.

Blaxland was a right-hand batsman and played 31 innings in 19 first-class matches with an average of 16.10. He was a right-arm fast-medium bowler and bowled 11 overs in the first-class game without taking a wicket. He was described as "a fine club cricketer who hit hard and often, hooking anything short of a length with great power. As a bowler he was tireless, and always alert and sharp in the field."

Blaxland retired from Repton in 1958 and took holy orders. He became rector of Tansley and then vicar of Doveridge.

Blaxland died at Temple Ewell, Kent, at the age of 78. He is the great-uncle of former Kent and Derbyshire player James Graham-Brown, who writes plays under the nom de plume "Dougie Blaxland".
