= Leonard Oliver (cricketer) =

English cricketer (1886–1948)

Personal information
- Full name: Leonard Oliver
- Born: 18 October 1886; Glossop, Derbyshire, England
- Died: 22 January 1948 (aged 61); Glossop, England
- Batting: Left-handed
- Bowling: Right-arm medium

Domestic team information
- Years: Team
- 1908–1924: Derbyshire
- FC debut: 21 May 1908 Derbyshire v Lancashire
- Last FC: 28 June 1924 Derbyshire v Leicestershire

Career statistics
Competition	First-class
Matches	174
Runs scored	6,303
Batting average	20.39
100s/50s	6/22
Top score	170
Balls bowled	419
Wickets	5
Bowling average	65.60
5 wickets in innings	0
10 wickets in match	0
Best bowling	2/20
Catches/stumpings	69/–
- Source: Cricinfo, 24 April 2024

Leonard Oliver (18 October 1886 – 22 January 1948) was an English cricketer who played for Derbyshire between 1908 and 1924.

Oliver was born in Glossop, Derbyshire and educated in Manchester. He made his debut for Derbyshire in the 1908 season in a drawn match against Lancashire. In his first three years he scored moderately and was frequently caught out. He achieved his first century 104 not out against Leicestershire in the 1910 season. In the 1911 season his average almost doubled and he scored a century against Hampshire. In the following three years he maintained his form, scoring centuries against Warwickshire in the 1913 season and becoming the club's top scorer that year. He scored a century against Northamptonshire in the 1914 season. Cricket was then suspended during the First World War.

In the 1919 season he played to his pre-war standard and was top scorer for the county again. In the 1920 season he was acting captain for most of the matches in the absence of John Chapman but the team never won a game and finished at the bottom of the championship table. This was despite Oliver's consistent performance with a top score of 170 against Nottinghamshire which led to his topping the batsmen's scores for the season again. In the 1921 season, Oliver made 151 against Warwickshire. His form then fell off and he played three matches in the 1922 season, two in the 1923 season and three in the 1924 season when he ceased playing in the Championship.

Oliver was a left-hand batsman and played 322 innings in 174 first-class matches. He scored 6 centuries with a top score 170 and an average 20.39. He was an expensive occasional right-arm medium pace bowler taking 5 wickets at an average of 65.60.

Oliver died in Glossop at the age of 61. At the time of his death he was vice-president of Derbyshire County Cricket Club.

Sporting positions
Preceded by Richard Baggallay	Derbyshire cricket captains 1919–1920	Succeeded by George Buckston
