= Simon Brown (cricketer) =

English cricketer (born 1969)

Personal information
- Full name: Simon John Emmerson Brown
- Born: 29 June 1969 (age 57); Cleadon, County Durham, England
- Nickname: Chubby
- Batting: Right-handed
- Bowling: Left-arm medium-fast
- Role: Bowler

International information
- National side: England
- Only Test (cap 581): 25 July 1996 v Pakistan

Domestic team information
- Years: Team
- 1987–1990: Northamptonshire
- 1991–2002: Durham

Career statistics
Competition	Test	FC	LA
Matches	1	159	113
Runs scored	11	1,796	217
Batting average	11.00	12.05	6.57
100s/50s	0/0	0/2	0/0
Top score	10*	69	18
Balls bowled	198	28,735	5,352
Wickets	2	550	132
Bowling average	69.00	28.72	30.77
5 wickets in innings	0	36	2
10 wickets in match	0	2	0
Best bowling	1/60	7/51	6/30
Catches/stumpings	1/–	42/–	23/–
- Source: ESPNcricinfo, 9 February 2022

Simon John Emmerson Brown (born 29 June 1969 in Cleadon, County Durham) is an English former cricketer who played as a left-arm medium-fast bowler and right-handed batsman. He played one Test for England in 1996. Domestically, he played for Northamptonshire from 1987 to 1990 and Durham from 1991 to 2002, before being released due to injuries.

As well as players such as Mark Ilott, Alan Mullally, Mike Smith and Paul Taylor, Brown was one of the myriad of left-arm bowlers tried by England during the 1990s. Like Smith, he was a "one-Test Wonder", playing in only a single Test match, which England lost to Pakistan. Despite taking two wickets, including Aamir Sohail with his tenth ball, he never played for England again.
