= Wilfred Carter =

English sportsman

Personal information
- Born: 19 June 1896; Annesley, Nottinghamshire, England
- Died: 1 November 1975 (aged 79); Watford, England
- Batting: Right-handed
- Bowling: Right-arm slow

Domestic team information
- Years: Team
- 1920–1926: Derbyshire
- FC debut: 7 July 1920 Derbyshire v Leicestershire
- Last FC: 3 July 1926 Derbyshire v Glamorgan

Career statistics
Competition	First-class
Matches	65
Runs scored	1,812
Batting average	17.76
100s/50s	2/6
Top score	145
Balls bowled	978
Wickets	16
Bowling average	44.18
5 wickets in innings	0
10 wickets in match	0
Best bowling	3/12
Catches/stumpings	25/–
- Source: CricketArchive, February 2012

Wilfred Carter (19 June 1896 – 1 November 1975) was an English sportsman who played first-class cricket for Derbyshire County Cricket Club between 1920 and 1926 and football for Watford Football Club at the same time.

== Life and career ==
Carter was born in Annesley, Nottinghamshire but the family moved to Bolsover, Derbyshire. He made his first-class cricket debut for Derbyshire in the 1920 season against Leicestershire in which match he scored 25 and 19. He played regularly throughout the year. Also in 1920, he joined Watford as left wing half. His arrival coincided with Watford's entry into the Football League for the first time in their history. He was one of 20 players to play for the club competitively at both Cassio Road and Vicarage Road.

Carter scored his first half-century in the 1921 cricket season. In the 1922 season he achieved his record first-class score of 145 against Leicestershire when he and Anthony Jackson made an eighth-wicket partnership of 182, a record for the county which lasted until 1996. He also headed the Derbyshire batting averages in 1922. In the 1923 season he made 100 not out against Northamptonshire. He left the Derbyshire staff after the 1924 season. However he returned to play four matches for Derbyshire in the 1926 season.

Carter was a right-handed batsman and played 112 innings in 65 first-class matches with an average of 17.76 and a top score of 145. He was a right-arm bowler of slow donkey-drops and took 16 first-class wickets for an average of 44.18 and a best performance of 3 for 12.

Upon his retirement from cricket, Carter worked as a coach and scout for Watford. He was a coach at Repton School in 1929 and 1930. He spent some years as professional at Drumpellier.

Carter died at Shrodells Hospital, Watford at the age of 79.
