= Richard Pratt (cricketer) =

English cricketer (1896–1982)

Richard Pratt (23 June 1896 – 10 October 1982) was an English cricketer who played first-class cricket for Derbyshire in 1923 and 1924.

Pratt was born at Lower Broughton, Salford, Lancashire. He made his debut for Derbyshire in August 1923 against Leicestershire. In his two innings, he made 13 and 2 which was to remain a typical scoreline for most of his matches. He played one more match in 1923 and three in 1924. Against Surrey he made his top score of 17 not out.

Pratt was a right-hand batsman and played ten innings in five first-class matches with an average of 8.11 and a top score of 17 not out. Though occasionally a wicket-keeper, he did not perform that role in any of his first-class appearances.

Pratt died in Alvaston, Derby at the age of 86.
