= Harry Storer Jr. =

English footballer and cricketer (1898–1967)

Harry Storer
Personal information
- Date of birth: 2 February 1898
- Place of birth: West Derby, Liverpool, England
- Date of death: 1 September 1967 (aged 69)
- Place of death: California, Derby, England
- Height: 5 ft 9 in (1.75 m)
- Positions: Inside left; left half

Youth career
- Ripley Town
- Eastwood Town
- 1918–1919: Notts County

Senior career*
Years	Team	Apps	(Gls)
1919–1921	Grimsby Town	64	(18)
1921–1928	Derby County	257	(60)
1929–1931	Burnley	52	(5)
Total		373	(83)

International career
1924–1927	England	2	(1)

Managerial career
- 1931–1945: Coventry City
- 1945–1948: Birmingham City
- 1948–1953: Coventry City
- 1955–1963: Derby County
- * Club domestic league appearances and goals

Harry Storer Jr.
Cricket information
- Batting: Right-handed
- Bowling: Leg-break

Domestic team information
- Years: Team
- 1920–1936: Derbyshire
- FC debut: 15 May 1920 Derbyshire v Yorkshire
- Last FC: 4 July 1936 Derbyshire v Warwickshire

Career statistics
Competition	First-class
Matches	302
Runs scored	13,513
Batting average	27.63
100s/50s	18/73
Top score	232
Balls bowled	16,416
Wickets	232
Bowling average	32.43
5 wickets in innings	9
10 wickets in match	0
Best bowling	7/26
Catches/stumpings	214/1
- Source: CricketArchive, 22 April 2010

Harry Storer (2 February 1898 – 1 September 1967) was an English professional footballer, cricketer and football manager.

== Early life ==
Storer was born in West Derby, Liverpool, the son of Harry Storer. He came from a sporting family; his father was a goalkeeper for Arsenal and Liverpool and played cricket for Derbyshire, and his uncle Bill Storer played cricket for England and Derbyshire and football for Derby County. Storer was educated at Heanor Secondary School.

== Football career ==
=== Club career ===
After leaving Storer played football for several clubs in the Derbyshire and Nottinghamshire area, including playing as an amateur for Notts County. He had trials at Millwall, but signed his first professional contract with Grimsby Town of the Third Division (North) in February 1919, a few months before the Football League resumed after the First World War. He played as an inside left or left half for Grimsby Town, Derby County, for whom he made more than 250 appearances, and Burnley.

=== International career ===
He also won two caps for England. His debut was in 1924 in a friendly match against France in Paris; Storer, playing at inside left, scored the third goal in a 3–1 win. His only other appearance for England came in the British Home Championship in 1927 against Ireland in Belfast; he played at left half in a 2–0 defeat, England playing the second half with nine men after goalkeeper Ted Hufton broke his arm and captain Jack Hill sustained a leg injury.

== Cricket career ==
Storer made his first-class cricket debut for Derbyshire in the 1920 season when neither his bowling nor batting averages were impressive. There was a significant improvements in both areas in the 1921 season, when he scored a century against Warwickshire. In the 1922 season his best score was 99, but he managed 7 for 26 bowling against Northamptonshire. In the 1923 season he was just short of a century again with 94 and dropped in the bowling averages as well. His batting slumped to a top score on 18 in the 1924 season when he managed 5 for 27 against Lancashire. His showing in the 1925 season was also relatively indifferent whereas in the 1926 season he topped the batting table in a run feast including 132 against Somerset while he took 41 wickets including two five-wicket innings. In the 1927 season his batting form continued with two centuries against Nottinghamshire in separate matches and a best bowling of 6 for 47 together with another five wicket innings. He topped the batting scores again in the 1928 season with centuries against Gloucestershire and Kent, and though his bowling was less productive he was an effective stand in as wicket-keeper against MCC for an injured Harry Elliott. His most productive summer with the bat was the 1929 season, when he topped the batting table again with 1,652 first-class runs at 36.71, including four hundreds and seven fifties. Against Essex at Derby, Storer (making 209) and Joseph Bowden (120) put on 322 for the first wicket. This remained a record first-wicket stand for Derbyshire until 2017. Storer scored four centuries again in the 1930 season. In the 1931 season his top score was 115 not out and he took a five wicket innings.

Storer became manager of Coventry City in June 1931 and played fewer cricket matches per season in the following years. In the 1932 season he played only seven matches and took no wickets, but scored 170 against Middlesex. He played half the club's matches in the 1933 season but achieved his career-best innings of 232, also versus Essex at Derby. In the 1934 season he scored a century against Somerset, but virtually dropped out of the bowling. He managed fewer high scores in the 1935 season. In the 1936 season he played nine matches to help Derbyshire to their County Championship win but made this his last season.

Storer was a right-handed batsman, leg spin bowler and occasional wicket-keeper He played in more than 300 first-class matches, all of which were for Derbyshire. As a bowler, Storer's best innings figures were 7/26 (including a hat-trick) against Northamptonshire at Chesterfield in 1922.

== Football management ==
Storer became manager of Coventry City in June 1931, guiding them to the Third Division (South) title in 1935–36. He left in June 1945 to manage Birmingham City, leading them to the Second Division title in 1947–48. Storer resigned as Birmingham manager in November 1948 to return for a second spell at Coventry which lasted until December 1953. He took over as manager of Derby County in June 1955, leading The Rams to the Third Division (North) title in 1956–57. He was asked to manage the Third Division North representative side in 1956/57.

Storer was cited as a major influence on the management style of Peter Taylor and Brian Clough. Taylor had played under Storer at Coventry and later encouraged him to sign Clough from Middlesbrough when Storer was the Derby County manager.

=== Managerial statistics ===
Managerial record by team and tenure
Team	From	To	Record				
Team	From	To	P	W	D	L	Win %
Coventry City	15 June 1931	20 June 1945	354	167	79	108	47.18
Birmingham City	20 June 1945	29 November 1948	118	60	30	28	50.85
Coventry City	29 November 1948	November 1953	230	88	49	93	38.26
Derby County	1 June 1955	31 May 1962	322	137	67	118	42.55
Total			1,024	452	225	347	44.14

== See also ==
- List of English cricket and football players
