= Joseph Bowden =

English cricketer (1884–1958)

Personal information
- Born: 8 October 1884; Glossop, Derbyshire, England
- Died: 1 March 1958 (aged 73); Glossop, England
- Batting: Right-handed
- Bowling: Right-arm medium

Domestic team information
- Years: Team
- 1909–1930: Derbyshire
- FC debut: 10 May 1909 Derbyshire v Sussex
- Last FC: 30 August 1930 Derbyshire v Gloucestershire

Career statistics
Competition	First-class
Matches	231
Runs scored	7,613
Batting average	20.57
100s/50s	4/29
Top score	120
Balls bowled	124
Wickets	1
Bowling average	54.00
5 wickets in innings	0
10 wickets in match	0
Best bowling	1/0
Catches/stumpings	79/–
- Source: CricketArchive, 4 January 2011

Joseph Bowden (8 October 1884 – 1 March 1958) was an English cricketer who played first-class cricket for Derbyshire from 1909 to 1930.

Bowden was born at Glossop, Derbyshire. He made his debut for Derbyshire in the 1909 season against Sussex in May when he made 6 and 14. Over the next four years he played about five games a year, but in the 1914 season he played 16 matches for the club. Cricket was interrupted by the First World War, and Bowden did not return to the first-class game until the 1921 season. In that season he scored his first century of 108 against Gloucestershire. He played steadily in the 1922 season and in the 1923 season scored 114 against Somerset. After good but uneventful seasons in 1924 and 1925, Bowden managed an average of 30.52 in the 1926 season, clocking up 1221 runs and making 106 against Warwickshire. He maintained form over the next three years and made his top score of 120 against Essex in the 1929 season when he partnered Harry Storer who made 209 to put on 322 for the first wicket. As of 2009, this remains the record first-wicket stand for Derbyshire. In the 1930 season, which was his last, he played fewer matches and his average was down to 9.69

Bowden was a right-hand batsman and played 395 innings in 231 first-class matches with an average of 20.57. He made over 7,600 runs and scored four centuries with a top score of 120. He was a right-arm medium pace bowler who took one wicket in 21 overs at an average of 54.00.

Bowden died at Glossop at the age of 73.
