= George Beet (cricketer, born 1886) =

English cricketer and umpire

Personal information
- Born: 24 April 1886; Somercotes, England
- Died: 13 December 1946 (aged 60); Somercotes, England
- Batting: Right-handed
- Role: Wicket-keeper
- Relatives: George Beet junior Gordon Beet

Domestic team information
- Years: Team
- 1910–1925: Derbyshire
- FC debut: 7 July 1910 Derbyshire v Kent
- Last FC: 16 May 1925 Derbyshire v Nottinghamshire

Umpiring information
- Tests umpired: 1 (1946)
- FC umpired: 290 (1926–1946)

Career statistics
Competition	First-class
Matches	48
Runs scored	1277
Batting average	16.37
100s/50s	0/6
Top score	92*
Balls bowled	48
Wickets	0
Bowling average	–
5 wickets in innings	–
10 wickets in match	–
Best bowling	–
Catches/stumpings	62/11
- Source: CricketArchive, 5 July 2013

George Beet (24 April 1886 – 13 December 1946) was an English cricketer who played for Derbyshire between 1910 and 1925 and for Marylebone Cricket Club (MCC) in 1920. He was later an umpire.

Beet was born in Somercotes, Derbyshire. Beet's first-class cricketing career began during the 1910 season, when he came in as wicket-keeper against Kent. At the time Derbyshire depended primarily on Joe Humphries behind the stumps. Beet appeared again two years later in the 1912 season, keeping wicket in a three games and losing his own wicket only once. In the 1913 and 1914 season he earned a regular place in the Derbyshire team as a batsman until the First World War interrupted his career. On his return in the 1919 season he was Derbyshire's regular wicket-keeper and also scored five half-centuries, including his career high score of 92 not out. He played occasionally during the first half of the 1920 season, but was displaced behind the stumps by Harry Elliott. He also played one game for MCC in 1920. From then on he appeared in just two further matches for the Derbyshire first team in the 1922 and 1925 season, the last being at the age of 39. When Fred Root was the Derbyshire fast bowler and Beet was taking the catches, their combined names in many scores earned the pair the "endearing name of Beet-root."

Beet was a right-handed batsman and played 88 innings in 48 first-class matches with an average of 16.37 and a top score of 92 not out. He kept wicket in about half his matches and took 62 catches and 11 wickets by stumping. He also bowled 8 overs without taking a wicket.

Beet later umpired 289 first-class matches between 1926 and 1946. He also spent several winters in South Africa as a coach. He achieved his ambition of umpiring a Test match, during the 1946 season, but on his way home from this match between England and India, he was taken ill on a train and despite an operation he died at home at Somercotes later that same year at the age of 60.

Beet's son, George Beet and grandson, Gordon Beet, were also cricketers who played for Derbyshire.
