= Archibald Slater =

English cricketer

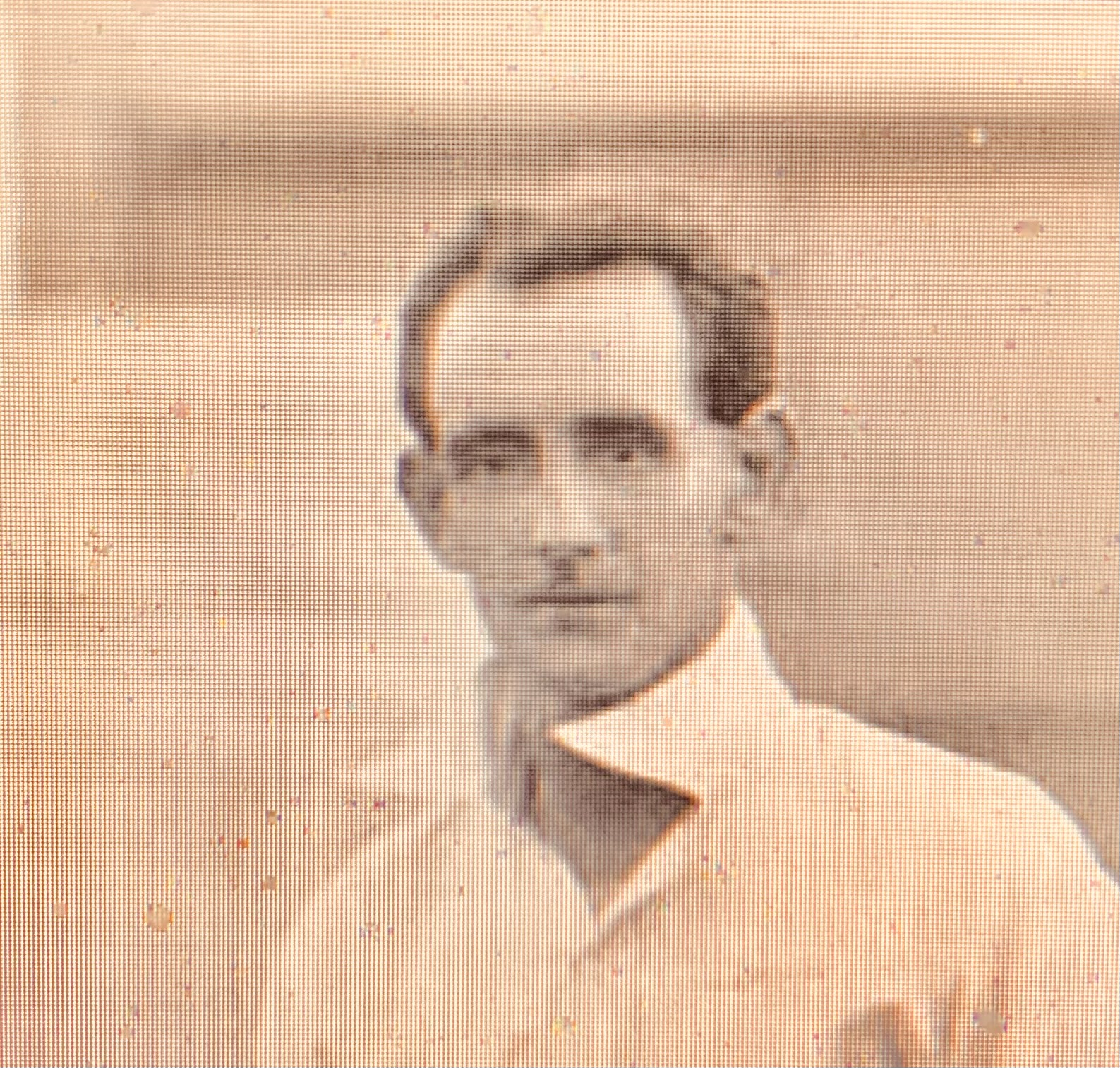

Personal information
- Full name: Archibald Gilbert Slater
- Born: 22 November 1890; Pilsley, Derbyshire, England
- Died: 22 July 1949 (aged 58); Manchester, Lancashire, England
- Batting: Right-handed
- Relatives: Henry Slater (father); Herbert Slater (brother)

Domestic team information
- Years: Team
- 1911–1931: Derbyshire
- First-class debut: 8 June 1911 Derbyshire v Northamptonshire
- Last First-class: 16 August 1933 Sir L Parkinson's XI v West Indies

Career statistics
Competition	First-class
Matches	211
Runs scored	5,943
Batting average	19.87
100s/50s	1/24
Top score	105
Balls bowled	29,936
Wickets	500
Bowling average	21.11
5 wickets in innings	28
10 wickets in match	2
Best bowling	8/24
Catches/stumpings	125/–
- Source: CricketArchive, 4 January 2011

Archibald Gilbert Slater (22 November 1890 – 22 July 1949) was an English cricketer who played for Derbyshire between 1911 and 1931.

Slater was born at Pilsley, Derbyshire the son of Henry Slater and his wife Sarah Bestwick His father had played for Derbyshire between 1882 and 1887.

Slater made his debut for Derbyshire in the 1911 season in June in a win against Northamptonshire when he scored 43 not out in the first innings which was to remain his best score in the season. In the 1912 season his best bowling performance was 5–80. In the 1913 season his best bowling performance was 5–43. In the 1914 season his bowling took off when he took 69 wickets. His best performance that year was 6–19 and he had 3 other 5 wicket performances. In the same year, he scored 99 against Hampshire.

After the First World War Slater played two games for Derbyshire in the 1919 season and one in the 1921 season and did not return for the full season until 1927. In the interval he was playing in the Lancashire League. Back to Derbyshire in the 1927 season, he made a century against Warwickshire. In the 1928 season he took 64 wickets and achieved a best performance of 8–24 against the West Indies and had three other 5 wicket performances. In the 1929 season he took 87 wickets with a best performance of 6–54 and again three other 5 wicket performances. In the 1930 season he took 8–46 against Worcestershire and had six other 5 wicket performances in a season when he took 81 wickets. He also managed a top batting score of 95. In the 1931 season he took 108 wickets took 8–51 against Essex and 8–67 against Kent with five other 5 wicket performances. However, after helping Derbyshire to 7th in the Championship table, he ended his Derbyshire career that season. He resumed his playing in the Lancashire League until 1939 and in 1932 played for Sir L Parkinson's XI v Lancashire. In 1933 the match for Sir L Parkinson's XI v West Indians qualified as first-class which brought his first-class wicket total to 500.

Slater was a right-arm medium pace bowler and took 500 wickets with an average of 21.11 and a best performance of 8–24, against the touring West Indies in May 1928. He was a right-hand batsman who played 327 innings in 211 first-class matches. He made one century, his top score of 105 and his average was 19.87.

Slater married Millicent Atkinson in 1919. His brother Herbert Slater also played for Derbyshire. Slater died in Manchester at the age of 58.
