= Samuel Cadman =

English cricketer

Sam Cadman
Personal information
- Full name: Samuel William Anthony Cadman
- Born: 29 January 1877; Werneth, Cheshire, England
- Died: 6 May 1952 (aged 75); Glossop, Derbyshire, England
- Batting: Right-handed
- Role: All rounder

Domestic team information
- Years: Team
- 1900–1926: Derbyshire
- FC debut: 10 May 1900 Derbyshire v Lancashire
- Last FC: 9 June 1926 Derbyshire v Kent

Career statistics
Competition	First-class
Matches	377
Runs scored	14,078
Batting average	21.46
100s/50s	8/61
Top score	126
Balls bowled	52,256
Wickets	807
Bowling average	25.24
5 wickets in innings	30
10 wickets in match	2
Best bowling	8/70
Catches/stumpings	278/–
- Source: CricketArchive, 26 April 2010

Samuel William Anthony Cadman (29 January 1877 – 6 May 1952) was an English cricketer who played for Derbyshire for over quarter of a century between 1900 and 1926. He was an effective all-rounder and scored over 14,000 runs and took over 800 wickets in his first-class career.

Cadman was born at Werneth, Cheshire, the son of Samuel Cadman, a cotton mill overlooker, and his wife Elizabeth. They were shortly afterwards living at Tintwistle.

Cadman made his debut for Derbyshire in May 1900 with an unnotable performance in a match against Lancashire. He played in two further matches that year, making his bowling debut against Surrey when he took a single wicket. He played five matches in 1901 but missed a season in 1902. From 1903 he became a regular player, remaining a stalwart all-rounder until 1926, and in a match against Nottinghamshire he took five wickets for 42. In 1904 he scored his first century which was against Essex. He had a very successful bowling season in 1905 taking 5–94 against the Australians, 6–27 against Lancashire and 5–91 against Yorkshire. In a match against Warwickshire he took 5–46 and 6–46 in a convincing win for Derbyshire which brought his total wickets to 100, Billy Bestwick's to 550, and Levi Wright's run total to 11500. Over the next few years Derbyshire remained close to or at the bottom of the points table despite his 6–41 against Hampshire in 1907, and centuries against Warwickshire in 1908 and against Leicestershire in 1909 and 1911. In 1913 he took 7–39 against Essex and 6–27 against Somerset and scored another century against Leicestershire. In 1914 he scored a century against Worcestershire and took 6–27 against Lancashire.

Following the First World War Cadman's 8–70 and 6–34 in a match against Northamptonshire was not enough to win even that match for Derbyshire in the unsuccessful 1920 season. In the 1920s he was still sharing the bowling with Bestwick, taking 5–20 against Gloucestershire in 1921, 5–41 against the West Indies in 1923 and 5–36 against Sussex in 1924. He was batting alongside Leonard Oliver, Guy Jackson and Harry Storer and in 1924 he scored a century against Northamptonshire. Cadman's last full season was in 1925. He played just one first-class match in 1926, but carried on club cricket as for Lightcliffe club in Yorkshire.

Cadman was a right-hand batsman who played 690 innings in 377 first-class matches. He made 14078 runs with eight centuries and an average of 21.46. He was a right-arm medium pace bowler who took 807 wickets with a best performance of 8–70 and an average of 25.24. Subsequently, Cadman became the club coach, and talent scout, picking players such as Elijah Carrington in his tours of local clubs. He also umpired friendly matches in the 1930s.

Cadman died at Glossop, Derbyshire at the age of 75.
