= Jim Hutchinson =

English cricketer (1896–2000)

Personal information
- Full name: James Metcalf Hutchinson
- Born: 29 November 1896; Tupton, Derbyshire, England
- Died: 7 November 2000 (aged 103); Doncaster, Yorkshire, England
- Batting: Right-handed
- Bowling: Right arm medium Right-arm off-break

Domestic team information
- Years: Team
- 1920–1931: Derbyshire
- FC debut: 7 August 1920 Derbyshire v Sussex
- Last FC: 11 July 1931 Derbyshire v Hampshire

Career statistics
| Competition | First-class |
|---|---|
| Matches | 256 |
| Runs scored | 7,055 |
| Batting average | 18.66 |
| 100s/50s | 5/31 |
| Top score | 143 |
| Balls bowled | 2,252 |
| Wickets | 31 |
| Bowling average | 39.93 |
| 5 wickets in innings | 0 |
| 10 wickets in match | 0 |
| Best bowling | 3/44 |
| Catches/stumpings | 97/2 |
- Source: CricketArchive, 22 April 2010

James Metcalf Hutchinson (29 November 1896 – 7 November 2000) was an English first-class cricketer who played more than 250 matches for Derbyshire County Cricket Club between 1920 and 1931. Until September 2018, when John Manners took the record, Hutchinson's unique claim to fame was that, of all first-class cricketers around the world, he was the longest-lived whose age had been incontestably established.

All but one of Hutchinson's 256 first-class matches were for Derbyshire. He was also selected for a Gentlemen v Players match at Blackpool in 1924, though neither team was of the strength usually sent out in the Lord's and Scarborough fixtures at this time, and the game was over in less than two days. It was, said Wisden Cricketers' Almanack, "a match by no means worthy of its high-sounding title".

Hutchinson never reached 1,000 runs in a season, his closest approach coming with 990 in 1928: he had been well on course at the end of July, having already passed 800, but his highest score in 16 innings thereafter was just 30. In other seasons, his run aggregate and average were often fairly modest, but he held his place in what was, admittedly, a consistently moderate batting side with his cover fielding, which was remarked upon year after year by Wisden. "There was no finer cover point in county cricket than Hutchinson," it wrote in the 1929 edition.

His career best score was 143, made against Leicestershire at Chesterfield in 1924, the highest score of the season for Derbyshire, who failed to win a match all season and contrived to lose this one after being ahead by 52 on first innings by being bowled out for 69 in the second innings. This remained his only hundred until 1927, when he scored two more, 110 against Glamorgan at Chesterfield and 102 against Gloucestershire at Gloucester, and enjoyed his best season in terms of averages, with 871 runs at 27.21. There was a fourth century in 1928, 111 against Warwickshire at Derby, and a final one the following season, 138 against Somerset at Burton-on-Trent, when he put on 153 for the seventh wicket with Archibald Slater and 113 for the eighth wicket with Arthur Richardson. In 1930, he played pretty regularly, but by this time batted mostly at No 7 or 8 and in the season he scored less than 500 runs. The following year, he played just nine matches and was not re-engaged at the end of the season.

Hutchinson was born in New Tupton, Derbyshire. He died in Doncaster aged 103 years 344 days.
