= Arthur Morton (cricketer, born 1883) =

English cricketer (1883–1935)

Personal information
- Born: 7 May 1883; Mellor, Derbyshire, England
- Died: 18 December 1935 (aged 52); Mellor, Derbyshire, England
- Batting: Right-handed
- Bowling: Right-arm off-break
- Role: All rounder

Domestic team information
- Years: Team
- 1903–1926: Derbyshire
- 1912–1920: MCC
- FC debut: 21 May 1903 Derbyshire v MCC
- Last FC: 21 August 1926 Derbyshire v Kent

Career statistics
Competition	First-class
Matches	357
Runs scored	1,0957
Batting average	19.32
100s/50s	6/45
Top score	131
Balls bowled	54,418
Wickets	981
Bowling average	22.77
5 wickets in innings	63
10 wickets in match	11
Best bowling	9/71
Catches/stumpings	129/–
- Source: CricketArchive, 26 April 2010

Arthur Morton (7 May 1883 – 18 December 1935) was an English cricketer who played first-class cricket for Derbyshire and Marylebone Cricket Club (MCC) between 1903 and 1926. He made over 10,000 runs and took nearly 1,000 wickets.

Morton was born at Mellor, Derbyshire. He made his debut for Derbyshire in May 1903 against MCC when he was out for a duck in both innings and took the only wicket in the second innings before MCC won. He played six matches in 1903 taking a total of 3 wickets with a top score of 22. However, in 1904 he played 17 matches, but only took six wickets and made a top score of 56. In 1905 his bowling picked up and he started to improve his run total, but it was 1907 before he managed his first 5 wicket innings. He managed another 5 wicket innings in 1908 but in 1909 took five 5-wicket innings with a best performance of 6–38. In 1910 against Hampshire he took 8 for 117 in the first innings and 2 wickets in the second to make it a 10 wicket match. In the whole season he achieved ten 5 wicket innings and three 10 wicket matches. In 1911 he managed his best bowling performance of 9 for 71 against Nottinghamshire and scored his first century against Hampshire. He took seven 5-wicket innings in 1912 with a best performance of 7 for 16 and five in 1913 with a best performance of 7 for 43. In 1913 he took three 5-wicket innings and made a top performance of 6 for 95. In 1912, 1913 and 1914 he played occasional games for MCC.

First-class cricket was suspended during the First World War and resumed in 1919 when Morton was charged with looking after the "bad boy" Billy Bestwick who had been allowed back into the Derbyshire team. Morton found form again in 1920 scoring a century against Leicestershire and taking 8 for 37 against Somerset and achieving nine 5 wicket innings in all, but none of this helped Derbyshire win a single match. In 1921 he took 8 for 69 in one of his four 5-wicket innings, but was absent for several weeks as a result of an accident. During a match against Yorkshire in June, the Yorkshire player Abe Waddington took Morton for a spin on his motorbike but crashed leaving Morton with broken ribs. Gilbert Curgenven was injured separately and with eight men left, Derbyshire were out for 23. Bestwick, who had just received a collection for taking 10 wickets in an innings, passed some of it on to his colleague Morton. In 1922 Morton achieved eight 5-wicket innings including 7 for 38 against Northamptonshire and scored a century against Essex. In 1923 he took 7 for 48 against Essex in one match and scored a century in the other. He scored another century against Essex in 1924 and achieved 6 for 58 against Gloucestershire He made his top score of 131 in 1925 against Essex and took 7 for 51 against Lancashire. He played his last season in 1926 when he had three 5-wicket returns.

Morton was a right-arm off-break, and medium pace bowler and took 981 first-class wickets at an average of 22.77 and a best performance of 9 for 71. He took five or more wickets in 63 innings and more than 10 wickets in eleven matches. He was a right-hand batsman and played 623 innings in 357 first-class matches with a top score of 131 and an average of 19.32. He made 10957 runs in total including six centuries.

In the following season of 1927 Morton started umpiring first-class matches standing in around 300 until his death in 1935. He umpired one Test match in 1928.

Morton died at Mellor, Derbyshire, at the age of 52.
