= Guy Jackson (cricketer) =

English cricketer (1896–1966)

Personal information
- Full name: Guy Rolf Jackson
- Born: 23 June 1896; Tupton, Derbyshire, England
- Died: 21 February 1966 (aged 69); Chesterfield, England
- Batting: Left-handed
- Relatives: Geoffrey Jackson (brother); Anthony Jackson (cousin)

Domestic team information
- Years: Team
- 1919–1936: Derbyshire
- FC debut: 23 July 1919 Derbyshire v Somerset
- Last FC: 18 July 1936 Derbyshire v Indians

Career statistics
Competition	First-class
Matches	280
Runs scored	10,291
Batting average	23.07
100s/50s	9/43
Top score	140
Balls bowled	311
Wickets	3
Bowling average	69.33
5 wickets in innings	0
10 wickets in match	0
Best bowling	1/10
Catches/stumpings	110/–
- Source: ESPNCricinfo, 31 January 2010

Guy Rolf Jackson (23 June 1896 – 21 February 1966) was an English cricketer who played first-class cricket for Derbyshire between 1919 and 1936, being captain for nine years.

Jackson was born at Ankerbold, Tupton, Derbyshire, the son of Brigadier G M Jackson, chairman of the Clay Cross Co., an iron and steel business. He was educated at Harrow School and in 1914 scored 59 against Eton at Lord's. He was due to go to Oxford University, but shortly after the outbreak of World War I, he was commissioned into the Derbyshire Yeomanry in October 1914. He served as a captain at Salonica in January 1918, and was awarded the Military Cross. He was also mentioned in despatches twice and also won the French Legion d’Honneur and the War Cross (Greece). Jackson was leading his troops on patrol when some Bulgarian soldiers approached, carrying a flag of truce. They were asking for the armistice, which was to end Bulgaria's part in the First World War.

After the war, Jackson returned to Derbyshire and made his first-class debut for the county in the 1919 season in July. He scored five and six in a low-scoring match against Somerset in which Derbyshire was bowled out for 37 in their second innings, losing by three wickets. In the 1922 season, he was appointed captain of the team which George Buckston had started to develop and he remained Derbyshire's captain for nine seasons. He quickly won the respect of his players and in his first season as captain, Derbyshire moved up to finish 11th, winning six games. Billy Bestwick led the bowling, although Derbyshire's batting was disappointing. By the 1927 season, Derbyshire had risen to fifth in the County Championship.

In the winter of 1926–27, Jackson had toured South America with a Marylebone Cricket Club (MCC) party, which was captained by Plum Warner . In a game against Argentina in Buenos Aires which MCC won by an innings and 12 runs, Jackson hit 73 his highest score of the tour. In 1927-28 he was appointed captain of the MCC party to tour South Africa but was unable to tour because of ill health.

After leading Derbyshire in 220 matches, Jackson gave up the club captaincy at the end of the 1930 season, handing over to Arthur Walker Richardson who took the team to the top. Jackson played occasionally until the 1936 season, his final first-class appearance for Derbyshire being in July against the Indian tourists in a rain-affected draw. From 1942 to 1960 he was chairman of Derbyshire's committee. He became joint managing director of Clay Cross Co. He died at Chesterfield.

Jackson's brother Geoffrey Jackson and cousin, Anthony Jackson, also played cricket for Derbyshire.

Sporting positions
Preceded by George Buckston	Derbyshire cricket captains 1922–1930	Succeeded by Arthur Richardson
