= List of Derbyshire County Cricket Club players =

This is a list in alphabetical order of cricketers who have played for Derbyshire County Cricket Club in top-class matches since it was founded in 1870. Derbyshire was a first-class team from 1871 to 1887 but was then demoted until its status was restored in 1895. Derbyshire have been a List A team since the beginning of limited overs cricket in 1963 and a top-class Twenty20 team since the inauguration of the Twenty20 Cup in 2003.

The details are the player's usual name followed by the years in which he was active as a Derbyshire player and then his name is given as it would appear on match scorecards. Note that many players represented other top-class teams besides Derbyshire. Current players are shown as active to the latest season in which they played for the club. The list excludes Second XI and other players who did not play for the club's first team; and players whose first team appearances were in minor matches only. The list has been updated to the end of the 2025 cricket season using the data published in Playfair Cricket Annual, 2022 edition.

== A ==
- Archibald Ackroyd (1924–1925): A Ackroyd
- Chris Adams (1987–1997): CJ Adams
- Stephen Adshead (2010): SJ Adshead
- Ben Aitchison (2020–2025): BW Aitchison
- Akhil Patel (2007): Akhil Patel
- Albert Alderman (1928–1948): AE Alderman
- Paul Aldred (1995–2002): P Aldred
- Michael Allen (1964–1966): MHJ Allen
- Richard Allsop (1872–1874): R Allsop
- Hashim Amla (2015): HM Amla
- Iain Anderson (1978–1987): IS Anderson
- Martin Andersson (2018–2025): MK Andersson
- William Antliff (1880): WN Antliff
- Christopher Armishaw (1973): CJ Armishaw
- Thomas Armstrong (1929–1950): TR Armstrong
- Maynard Ashcroft (1897–1906): EM Ashcroft
- Thomas Attenborough (1870–1874): T Attenborough
- Azeem Rafiq (2011): Azeem Rafiq
- Mohammad Azharuddin (1991–1994): M Azharuddin

== B ==
- Richard Baggallay (1912–1919): RRC Baggallay
- William Bagguley (1905): W Bagguley
- Harry Bagshaw (1887–1902): H Bagshaw
- Rob Bailey (2000–2002): RJ Bailey
- Andrew Bairstow (1995): AD Bairstow
- Gary Ballance (2006–2007): GS Ballance
- Frederick Barber (1907–1920): FA Barber
- Eddie Barlow (1976–1980): EJ Barlow
- Dick Barlow (1875): RG Barlow
- Alan Barnes (1878): AS Barnes
- Ed Barnes (2020): E Barnes
- Kim Barnett (1979–1998): KJ Barnett
- George Barrington (1879–1887): GB Barrington
- Frank Barrs (1900–1901): FA Barrs
- Arthur Barton (1901): A Barton
- Simon Base (1988–1999): SJ Base
- Amrit Basra (2025): AS Basra
- Chris Bassano (2001–2005): CWG Bassano
- Mark Beardshall (1987): M Beardshall
- Edward Bedford (1924): EHR Bedford
- Gordon Beet (1956–1961): GA Beet
- George Beet (1910–1925): G Beet
- George Beet (1928–1932): GHC Beet
- Geoffrey Bell (1914–1921): GF Bell
- John Bennett (1895–1896): JW Bennett
- Michael Bentley (1957): M Bentley
- Bob Berry (1959–1962): R Berry
- John Berwick (1895–1901): JA Berwick
- Robert Bestwick (1920–1922): RS Bestwick
- Billy Bestwick (1898–1925): W Bestwick
- James Billyeald (1870–1871): J Billyeald
- Frank Bingham (1896): FM Bingham
- Dan Birch (2007–2009): DJ Birch
- William Birkett (1898–1901): W Birkett
- Travis Birt (2006–2007): TR Birt
- Ian Bishop (1989–1993): IR Bishop
- Henry Blackwell (1895–1898): H Blackwell
- Ian Blackwell (1997–1999): ID Blackwell
- Lionel Blaxland (1925–1947): LB Blaxland
- Albert Blount (1912–1926): A Blount
- Timothy Boden (1920): TW Boden
- Walter Boden (1874): W Boden
- Paul Boissier (1901–1906): AP Boissier
- Brian Bolus (1973–1976): JB Bolus
- Jesse Boot (1885–1895): J Boot
- Anthony Borrington (1970–1981): AJ Borrington
- Paul Borrington (2005–2014): PM Borrington
- Loots Bosman (2010): LE Bosman
- Herbert Bostock (1897): H Bostock
- Ant Botha (2004–2007): AG Botha
- Daniel Bottom (1891–1901): D Bottom
- John Bourne (1898): JJ Bourne
- Joseph Bowden (1909–1930): J Bowden
- Peter Bowler (1988–1994): PD Bowler
- Herbert Bowmer (1909–1911): HE Bowmer
- Frederick Bracey (1906–1914): FC Bracey
- Leslie Bradbury (1971): L Bradbury
- George Bradley (1875): G Bradley
- Jim Brailsford (1958): FC Brailsford
- James Brelsford (1883–1886): J Brelsford
- Callum Brodrick (2017–2018): CAJ Brodrick
- David Brooke-Taylor (1947–1949): DC Brooke-Taylor
- Geoffrey Brooke-Taylor (1920): GP Brooke-Taylor
- Henry Brookes (2023): HJH Brookes
- Joseph Brooks (1895–1896): J Brooks
- Kevin Brooks (1980–1981): KG Brooks
- Neil Broom (2016): NT Broom
- Ian Broome (1984): I Broome
- Andrew Brown (1985–1992): AM Brown
- Pat Brown (2023–2025): PR Brown
- Richard Browning (2006): RJ Browning
- James Bryant (2004–2005): JDC Bryant
- George Buckley (1921): GA Buckley
- George Buckston (1905–1921): GM Buckston
- Robin Buckston (1928–1939): RHR Buckston
- Peter Burgoyne (2011–2013): PI Burgoyne
- George Burnham (1912): GJ Burnham
- John Burnham (1871–1876): JW Burnham
- Matthew Burrows (1884): M Burrows
- Joseph Burton (1901): JP Burton
- Oswald Burton (1901–1905): O Burton
- Walter Butterfield (1896): W Butterfield
- Ian Buxton (1959–1973): IR Buxton
- Noah Buxton (1902–1911): N Buxton

== C ==
- Samuel Cadman (1900–1926): SWA Cadman
- Harry Came (2021–2025): HRC Came
- Robert Carlin (1905–1908): RM Carlin
- Donald Carr (1946–1963): DB Carr
- Elijah Carrington (1934–1941): E Carrington
- Andy Carter (2016): A Carter
- Raich Carter (1946): HS Carter
- Reginald Carter (1952–1955): R Carter
- Wilfred Carter (1920–1926): W Carter
- John Cartledge (1878): J Cartledge
- Harold Cartwright (1971–1980): H Cartwright
- Hilton Cartwright (2022): HWR Cartwright
- Matthew Cassar (1994–2000): ME Cassar
- Shivnarine Chanderpaul (2013–2014): S Chanderpaul
- John Chapman (1909–1920): J Chapman
- James Chapman (2004): JR Chapman
- Zak Chappell (2023–2025): ZJ Chappell
- Alfred Charlesworth (1888–1898): A Charlesworth
- Joseph Chatterton (1884–1886): JD Chatterton
- William Chatterton (1882–1902): W Chatterton
- Charles Chester (1899): C Chester
- Jonathan Clare (2007–2015): JL Clare
- Charles Clarke (1929–1933): CC Clarke
- Rikki Clarke (2008–2009): R Clarke
- Vince Clarke (1997–1999): VP Clarke
- John Clayton (1879–1883): JM Clayton
- Alfred Cochrane (1884–1886): AHJ Cochrane
- Michael Cohen (2020–2022): MAR Cohen
- Terence Cole (1913): TGO Cole
- Sam Conners (2019–2024): S Conners
- Enoch Cook (1870–1879): E Cook
- John Cooke (1874): J Cooke
- Archibold Cooper (1902): AHH Cooper
- Herbert Cooper (1905–1910): H Cooper
- Bill Copson (1932–1950): WH Copson
- Bertie Corbett (1910): BO Corbett
- John Corbett (1911–1924): CJ Corbett
- Dominic Cork (1990–2003): DG Cork
- Greg Cork (2016–2017): GTG Cork
- Andy Cottam (1995): AC Cottam
- Ben Cotton (2014–2017): BD Cotton
- Edwin Coup (1885–1887): E Coup
- James Cresswell (1923–1941): JA Cresswell
- Matthew Critchley (2015–2021): MJJ Critchley
- John Crommelin-Brown (1922–1926): JL Crommelin-Brown
- William Cropper (1882–1888): W Cropper
- Gareth Cross (2014): GD Cross
- James Cross (1897): J Cross
- Daryll Cullinan (1995): DJ Cullinan
- Joseph Cupitt (1892–1905): J Cupitt
- Gilbert Curgenven (1901–1922): G Curgenven
- Henry Curgenven (1896–1897): HG Curgenven
- William Curgenven (1870–1881): WG Curgenven
- Arthur Cursham (1879–1880): AW Cursham
- Simon Cusden (2007): SMJ Cusden

== D ==
- Anuj Dal (2018–2025): AK Dal
- Frank Davidson (1897–1899): F Davidson
- George Davidson (1885–1898): GA Davidson
- Joseph Davidson (1871–1874): J Davidson
- John Davis (1920): JW Davis
- Will Davis (2015–2018): WS Davis
- George Dawkes (1947–1961): GO Dawkes
- Roger de Ville (1963–1964): RT de Ville
- Michael Deakin (1981): MJ Deakin
- Kevin Dean (1996–2008): KJ Dean
- Michael Deane (1999): MJ Deane
- Irvine Dearnaley (1900–1907): I Dearnaley
- Phillip DeFreitas (1994–1999): PAJ DeFreitas
- William Delacombe (1884–1900): WB Delacombe
- Wayne Dessaur (1995): WA Dessaur
- Jade Dernbach (2021): JW Dernbach
- Michael Di Venuto (2000–2006): MJ Di Venuto
- Stanley Dickinson (1909): SP Dickinson
- Michael Dighton (2007): MG Dighton
- Tillakaratne Dilshan (2015): TM Dilshan
- James Disney (1881–1890): JJ Disney
- Francis Dixon (1885): F Dixon
- Kenneth Dobson (1920): KWC Dobson
- Dudley Docker (1881–1882): FD Docker
- Ludford Docker (1881–1886): LC Docker
- Ralph Docker (1879–1884): R Docker
- Aneurin Donald (2023–2025): AHT Donald
- Nayan Doshi (2008): ND Doshi
- Stephen Doughty (1880–1886): S Doughty
- Mathew Dowman (2000–2002): MP Dowman
- Nathan Dumelow (2001–2004): NRC Dumelow
- Leus du Plooy (2019–2023): JL du Plooy
- Christopher Durham (2011–2012): CM Durham
- Wes Durston (2010–2016): WJ Durston

== E ==
- John Eadie (1882): JTC Eadie
- William Eadie (1885–1899): WS Eadie
- Ryan Eagleson (1999): RL Eagleson
- George Earl (1881–1888): GB Earl
- Alwyn Eato (1950–1955): A Eato
- Alex Edwards (2001): AD Edwards
- John Eggar (1946–1954): JD Eggar
- Charlie Elliott (1932–1953): CS Elliott
- Harry Elliott (1920–1949): H Elliott
- William Ellis (1898–1906): W Ellis
- Robert Else (1901–1903): R Else
- Scott Elstone (2013–2015): SL Elstone
- Sean Ervine (2018): SM Ervine
- Edward Estridge (1874): E Estridge
- Alasdair Evans (2011/12–2013): AC Evans
- Charles Evans (1889–1895): C Evans
- Henry Evans (1878–1884): H Evans
- Thomas Evans (1883): T Evans
- Edward Evershed (1888–1898): E Evershed
- Sydney Evershed (1880–1901): SH Evershed
- Wallis Evershed (1882–1884): W Evershed
- Percy Exham (1883): PG Exham
- John Eyre (1908): JA Eyre
- John Eyre (1963–1968): JR Eyre
- Peter Eyre (1959–1972): TJP Eyre

== F ==
- Mark Fell (1985): MA Fell
- Lockie Ferguson (2018): LH Ferguson
- Roger Finney (1982–1988): RJ Finney
- John Fisher (1921–1922): J Fisher
- Charles Fleming (1907): CB Fleming
- Cam Fletcher (2024): CD Fletcher
- Henry Fletcher (1907–1908): H Fletcher
- Luke Fletcher (2016): LJ Fletcher
- Thomas Fletcher (1906): T Fletcher
- Joseph Flint (1872–1879): J Flint
- Louis Flint (1919–1920): LE Flint
- Edward Foley (1871): EFW Foley
- Ian Folley (1991): I Folley
- Mark Footitt (2009/10–2018): MHA Footitt
- Neville Ford (1926–1934): NM Ford
- Arthur Forman (1877–1882): AFE Forman
- Frederick Forman (1911): FG Forman
- Thomas Forrester (1902–1920): T Forrester
- Thomas Foster (1873–1884): T Foster
- William Foulke (1900): WH Foulke
- Bill Fowler (1982–1985): WP Fowler
- Ben France (2004–2005): BJ France
- Michael Frederick (1949): MC Frederick
- Charlie Freeman (1911): CR Freeman
- Travis Friend (2005): TJ Friend
- George Frost (1872–1880): G Frost
- John Frost (1873–1876): JH Frost
- Walter Fullwood (1945–1946): W Fullwood
- Brian Furniss (1955–1956): JB Furniss

== G ==
- Andrew Gait (2002–2004): AI Gait
- Roy Genders (1943–1946): WR Genders
- Allah Mohammad Ghazanfar (2025): AM Ghazanfar
- Peter Gibbs (1966–1973): PJK Gibbs
- Ian Gibson (1957–1961): I Gibson
- John Gilbert (1930–1936) : JDH Gilbert
- Chris Gladwin (1989): C Gladwin
- Cliff Gladwin (1939–1958): C Gladwin
- Joseph Gladwin (1914–1919): J Gladwin
- Alfie Gleadall (2017–2019): AF Gleadall
- Michael Glenn (1975–1976): M Glenn
- Lee Goddard (2004–2010): LJ Goddard
- Billy Godleman (2013–2023): BA Godleman
- Steve Goldsmith (1988–1992): SC Goldsmith
- John Goodall (1895–1896): J Goodall
- George Goodwin (1921): GW Goodwin
- Edward Gothard (1947–1948): EJ Gothard
- Thomas Gould (1896–1897): T Gould
- James Graham-Brown (1977–1978): JMH Graham-Brown
- George Grainger (1909–1921): G Grainger
- Andy Gray (2005–2006): AKD Gray
- David Green (1953–1960): DJ Green
- George Green (1903–1907): G Green
- Dove Gregory (1870–1872): D Gregory
- George Gregory (1899–1910): GR Gregory
- Frank Griffith (1987–1999): FA Griffith
- Steven Griffiths (1995–1999): SP Griffiths
- Tim Groenewald (2009–2014): TD Groenewald
- Brooke Guest (2020–2025): BD Guest
- Neil Gunter (2002–2004): NEL Gunter
- Martin Guptill (2011–2015): MJ Guptill

== H ==
- Peter Hacker (1982): PJ Hacker
- Haider Ali (2023): Haider Ali
- Bert Hall (1902): B Hall
- Derek Hall (1955–1958): D Hall
- Ian Hall (1959–1972): IW Hall
- John Hall (1895–1897): JP Hall
- Tom Hall (1949–1952): TA Hall
- Walter Hall (1882–1892): W Hall
- Thomas Hallam (1906–1907): TH Hallam
- Arnold Hamer (1950–1960): A Hamer
- John Hampshire (1982–1984): JH Hampshire
- Joseph Hancock (1897–1900): JW Hancock
- James Handford (1910): J Handford
- Raymond Hanson (1973–1974): RL Hanson
- Solomon Hardy (1898): S Hardy
- Andrew Harris (1994–1999): AJ Harris
- Chris Harris (2003): CZ Harris
- Archie Harrison (2022): A Harrison (Note: Harrison made his List A debut in August 2022 against Worcester. He had previously played for the Derbyshire Second XI and the Derbyshire Academy. He has also played for Hertfordshire.)
- Tom Harrison (1995): TW Harrison
- Ian Harvey (2007): IJ Harvey
- John Harvey (1963–1973): JF Harvey
- Ashley Harvey-Walker (1971–1978): AJ Harvey-Walker
- Hassan Adnan (2003–2007): Hasan Adnan
- Paul Havell (2003–2005): PMR Havell
- Joe Hawkins (2025): JWA Hawkins
- George Hay (1874–1886): G Hay
- Rory Haydon (2025): ROL Haydon
- Andy Hayhurst (1997): AN Hayhurst
- Nantie Hayward (2009): M Hayward
- Ron Headley (1975–1976): RGA Headley
- Frederick Heath (1924–1925): FR Heath
- John Heath (1924–1925): JS Heath
- Rob Hemmings (2016–2017): RP Hemmings
- Mike Hendrick (1969–1981): M Hendrick
- Matt Henry (2017): MJ Henry
- Dominic Hewson (2002–2004): DR Hewson
- William Hickton (1871–1878): W Hickton
- Matt Higginbottom (2010–2013): M Higginbottom
- Thomas Higson (1932–1935): TA Higson junior
- Thomas Higson (1899–1910): TA Higson senior
- Alan Hill (1972–1986): A Hill
- Maurice Hill (1966–1967): M Hill
- Basil Hill-Wood (1919–1925): BSH Hill-Wood
- Charles Hill-Wood (1928–1930): CKH Hill-Wood
- Denis Hill-Wood (1928–1929): DJCH Hill-Wood
- Wilfred Hill-Wood (1919–1936): WWH Hill-Wood
- Amos Hind (1876–1877): A Hind
- Wavell Hinds (2008–2009): WW Hinds
- Gilbert Hodgkinson (1935–1946): GF Hodgkinson
- J. Hodgkinson (1882): J Hodgkinson (Note: Hodgkinson is known to have played a single match, a first-class fixture against MCC in 1882. Other than a surname and initial, no biographical details are known.)
- Richard Hodgkinson (2007): R Hodgkinson
- Dan Hodgson (2014): DM Hodgson
- Arthur Hogg (1905–1906): A Hogg
- Stanley Holden (1910–1920): SM Holden
- Michael Holding (1983–1989): MA Holding
- James Horsley (1914–1925): J Horsley
- Harvey Hosein (2014–2021): HR Hosein
- Thomas Hounsfield (1938–1945): TD Hounsfield
- Edward Houseman (1897): EO Houseman
- Thomas Howarth (1873): T Howarth
- Albert Howcroft (1908–1910): A Howcroft
- Fynn Hudson-Prentice (2019–2025): FJ Hudson-Prentice
- Alex Hughes (2011–2022): AL Hughes
- Chesney Hughes (2009–2016): CF Hughes
- Norton Hughes-Hallett (1913–1914): NM Hughes-Hallett
- John Hulme (1887–1903): JJ Hulme
- William Humble (1873–1879): WJ Humble
- Joe Humphries (1899–1914): J Humphries
- Samuel Hunt (1936): SW Hunt
- Frederic Hunter (1905–1907): FC Hunter
- Ian Hunter (2004–2010): ID Hunter
- Colin Hurt (1914): CNB Hurt
- Liam Hurt (2022): LJ Hurt
- Jim Hutchinson (1920–1931): JM Hutchinson

== I ==
- Richard Illingworth (2001): RK Illingworth
- Imran Tahir (2017): Imran Tahir
- Clive Inman (1973): CC Inman

== J ==
- Brian Jackson (1963–1968): AB Jackson
- Geoffrey Jackson (1912–1914): GL Jackson
- Guy Jackson (1919–1936): GR Jackson
- Les Jackson (1947–1968): HL Jackson
- Leonard Jackson (1877–1882): L Jackson
- Martin Jean-Jacques (1986–1992): M Jean-Jacques
- Stephen Jefferies (1982): ST Jefferies
- Henry Jelf (1910–1911): HFD Jelf
- William Jervis (1873): WM Jervis
- Caleb Jewell (2025): CP Jewell
- Laurie Johnson (1949–1966): HL Johnson
- Richard Johnson (2012–2014): RM Johnson
- Duncan Johnston (1882): DA Johnston
- Dean Jones (1996–1997): DM Jones
- Steffan Jones (2006–2011): PS Jones
- Henry Jordan (1926): HGB Jordan

== K ==
- Mohammad Kaif (2003): M Kaif
- Simon Katich (2007): SM Katich
- Frederick Keeton (1876–1888): FW Keeton
- John Kelly (1950–1960): JM Kelly
- Richard Kenward (1899): R Kenward
- Hayden Kerr (2022): HL Kerr
- Jason Kerr (2002): JID Kerr
- Gul Khan (1996–1997): GA Khan
- Rawait Khan (2001–2004): RM Khan
- Wasim Khan (2001): WG Khan
- Zubair Khan (2000): ZM Khan (Note: Zubair Khan, whose brother Rawait Khan also played for the club, played as a fast bowler in a single first-class match for Derbyshire against Cambridge University in an early season match in 2000 as a 17-year old, taking a single wicket. He played second XI cricket for Derbyshire and Worcestershire and was twelfth man in the Derbyshire team at least once during the 2000 season.)
- Peter Kirsten (1978–1982): PN Kirsten
- Frederik Klokker (2007–2009): FA Klokker
- Tom Knight (2011–2015): TC Knight
- Karl Krikken (1987–2003): KM Krikken
- Adrian Kuiper (1990): AP Kuiper

== L ==
- Thomas Lace (2018–2019): TC Lace
- Simon Lacey (1997–2000): SJ Lacey
- Suranga Lakmal (2022–2023): RAS Lakmal
- Matt Lamb (2023–2024): MJ Lamb
- George Langdale (1936–1945): GR Langdale
- Charl Langeveldt (2008–2010): CK Langeveldt
- Samuel Langton (1909–1910): ST Langton
- Stuart Law (2009): SG Law
- Mark Lawson (2008–2009): MAK Lawson
- Albert Lawton (1900–1910): AE Lawton
- Charles Lee (1954–1965): C Lee
- Garnet Lee (1925–1933): GM Lee
- Colin Leech (1922): C Leech
- Thomas Limb (1878): T Limb
- Douglas Linathan (1920): DV Linathan
- Matt Lineker (2011–2012): MS Lineker
- John Lister (1978–1979): JW Lister
- David Lloyd (2023–2025): DL Lloyd
- William Locker (1894–1903): W Locker
- Escott Loney (1925–1927): EF Loney
- Charles Lowe (1909–1912): C Lowe
- George Lowe (1949–1953): G Lowe
- Tom Lungley (2000–2010): T Lungley
- Charles Lyon (1902): CH Lyon

== M ==
- Charlie MacDonell (2016–2017): CM MacDonell
- Calum MacLeod (2018): CS MacLeod
- Wayne Madsen (2009–2025): WL Madsen
- Bernie Maher (1981–1993): BJM Maher
- Devon Malcolm (1984–1997): DE Malcolm
- George Maltby (1905): G Maltby
- Samuel Malthouse (1890–1895): S Malthouse
- William Malthouse (1919–1920): WN Malthouse
- Christopher Marks (1967–1969): CP Marks
- Joseph Marlow (1879–1890): J Marlow
- George Marple (1901): GS Marple
- Chris Marples (1984–1986): C Marples
- George Marples (1905): GH Marples
- Arthur Marsden (1910): A Marsden
- George Marsden (1894–1898): GA Marsden
- Eric Marsh (1943–1949): FE Marsh
- Connor Marshall (2021): CR Marshall
- Joseph Marshall (1887–1890): J Marshall
- Anthony Mather-Jackson (1920–1927): AH Mather-Jackson
- Michael May (1996–1999): MR May
- Edmund Maynard (1880–1887): EAJ Maynard
- Ewan McCray (1991): E McCray
- Rod McCurdy (1979): RJ McCurdy
- Ben McDermott (2021): BR McDermott
- John McDonald (1905–1906): JA McDonald
- Conor McKerr (2017–2023): C McKerr
- Mattie McKiernan (2018–2023) : MH McKiernan
- Alan McLellan (1978–1979): AJ McLellan
- Stuart McMillan (1922–1924): ST McMillan
- Alan Mellor (1978–1980): AJ Mellor
- Alex Mellor (2016): AJ Mellor
- Dustin Melton (2019–2022): DR Melton
- Jeevan Mendis (2017): BMAJ Mendis
- Charles Middleton (1896–1903): C Middleton
- Geoff Miller (1973–1990): G Miller
- David Millner (1960–1964): D Millner
- Tom Milnes (2015–2017): TP Milnes
- Tommy Mitchell (1928–1945): TB Mitchell
- Mohammad Amir (2024): Mohammad Amir
- Mohammad Ali (2002–2004): Mohammad Ali
- Keith Mohan (1957–1958): KF Mohan
- Dallas Moir (1981–1985): DG Moir
- Robert Moncreiff, 3rd Baron Moncreiff (1873–1874): RC Moncreiff
- Matt Montgomery (2025): M Montgomery
- Harry Moore (2023–2024): HJ Moore
- Stephen Moore (2014): SC Moore
- Derek Morgan (1950–1969): DC Morgan
- Albie Morkel (2013): JA Morkel
- Jack Morley (2024–2025): JP Morley
- Alan Morris (1973–1980): A Morris
- John Morris (1982–1993): JE Morris
- Ole Mortensen (1983–1994): OH Mortensen
- Arthur Morton (1901): A Morton
- Arthur Morton (1903–1926): A Morton
- Jonathan Moss (2004–2005): J Moss
- Edwin Moulton (2021): EHT Moulton
- Tim Munton (2000–2002): TA Munton
- Eric Murray (1911): EC Murray
- Frank Mycroft (1893–1895): F Mycroft
- Thomas Mycroft (1877–1885): T Mycroft
- William Mycroft (1873–1885): W Mycroft

== N ==
- Naved-ul-Hasan (2012): Naved-ul-Hasan
- Ernest Needham (1901–1912): E Needham
- Joseph Needham (1883): J Needham
- Jake Needham (2005–2011): J Needham
- James Neesham (2016): JDS Neesham
- Tom New (2008): TJ New
- Charles Newcombe (1910): CN Newcombe
- Mark Newell (1999): M Newell
- Paul Newman (1980–1989): PG Newman
- Frederick Newton (1909–1919): FA Newton
- Henry Nicholls (2018): HM Nicholls
- Charles Nornable (1909): CE Nornable
- Marcus North (2006–2014): MJ North

== O ==
- William Oates (1959–1965): WF Oates
- John O'Connor (1900: J O'Connor
- Tim O'Gorman (1987–1996): TJG O'Gorman
- Stephen Oldham (1980–1983): S Oldham
- James Oldknow (1901): J Oldknow
- Leonard Oliver (1908–1924): L Oliver
- Duanne Olivier (2018): D Olivier
- Charles Ollivierre (1901–1907): CA Ollivierre
- George Osborne (1879–1883): G Osborne
- John Owen (1995–1997): JEH Owen

== P ==
- Michael Page (1964–1975): MH Page
- William Page (1881–1882): W Page
- Christopher Paget (2004–2007): CD Paget
- Tony Palladino (2011–2019): AP Palladino
- Garry Park (2009–2012): GT Park
- Callum Parkinson (2016): CF Parkinson
- William Parrington (1926): WF Parrington
- Parvez Mir (1975): Parvez Mir
- Samit Patel (2024–2025): SR Patel
- Wilfred Payton (1940–1949): WEG Payton
- Frederick Peach (1907–1925): FG Peach
- William Peach (1905): W Peach
- Jack Pearson (1945–1946): LI Pearson
- William Pedley (1888): WE Pedley
- Robin Peterson (2010): RJ Peterson
- Toby Pettman (2022): THS Pettman
- Adrian Pierson (2001): ARK Pierson
- Hubert Pink (1900): HS Pink
- James Pipe (2006–2009): DJ Pipe
- John Platts (1870–1884): JTBD Platts
- Harry Podmore (2017): HW Podmore
- Alf Pope (1930–1945): AV Pope
- George Pope (1933–1948): GH Pope
- Harold Pope (1939–1946): H Pope
- George Porter (1881–1896): G Porter
- Nick Potts (2022–2025): NJ Potts
- Daren Powell (2004): DBL Powell
- Thomas Poynton (2007–2016): T Poynton
- Richard Pratt (1923–1924): R Pratt
- Nils Priestley (2021): NO Priestley
- William Prince (1898): W Prince
- Cheteshwar Pujara (2014): CA Pujara
- Henry Purdy (1906–1919): HF Purdy
- John Purdy (1896–1906): JH Purdy
- James Pyemont (1999–2002): JP Pyemont

== Q ==
- Hamidullah Qadri (2017–2019): H Qadri

== R ==
- Henry Radford (1920): HW Radford
- Ravi Rampaul (2018–2021): R Rampaul
- Boyd Rankin (2006–2019): WB Rankin
- George Ratcliffe (1919): G Ratcliffe
- George Ratcliffe (1887–1889): G Ratcliffe
- Walter Reader-Blackton (1914–1921): W Reader-Blackton
- Dan Redfern (2006–2013): DJ Redfern
- Ian Redpath (1989): I Redpath
- Luis Reece (2017–2025): LM Reece
- Charles Regan (1877): C Regan
- Alan Revill (1941–1957): AC Revill
- Tom Revill (1913–1920): TF Revill
- Dusty Rhodes (1937–1954): AEG Rhodes
- Harold Rhodes (1953–1975): HJ Rhodes
- Alan Richardson (1995): A Richardson
- Arthur Walker Richardson (1928–1936): AW Richardson
- Alastair Richardson (1992–1993): AW Richardson
- Bertram Richardson (1950–1953): BH Richardson
- William Richardson (1959–1965): GW Richardson
- John Richardson (1878–1883): J Richardson
- Samuel Richardson (1870–1878): S Richardson
- Thomas Richardson (1895): TH Richardson
- Reginald Rickman (1906–1911): RB Rickman
- William Rigley (1873–1882): W Rigley
- Joseph Rimmer (1949): J Rimmer
- Nathan Rimmington (2015): NJ Rimmington
- Bruce Roberts (1983–1991): B Roberts
- Glenn Roberts (1996–1999): GM Roberts
- Chris Rogers (2004–2010): CJL Rogers
- Adrian Rollins (1993–1999): AS Rollins
- Fred Root (1910–1920): CF Root
- Alfred Rose (1924): A Rose
- Lawrence Rowe (1974): LG Rowe
- Christopher Rudd (1986–1987): CFBP Rudd
- Fred Rumsey (1969–1973): FE Rumsey
- Philip Russell (1965–1986): PE Russell
- Hamish Rutherford (2015–2016): HD Rutherford

== S ==
- Zahid Sadiq (1990): ZA Sadiq
- John Sadler (2008–2010): JL Sadler
- Oliver Saffell (2007): OHJ Saffell
- Dick Sale (1949–1954): R Sale junior
- Richard Sale (1908–1912): R Sale senior
- Gurjit Sandhu (2017): GS Sandhu
- Mark Saxelby (2000): M Saxelby
- George Scrimshaw (2021–2023): GLS Scrimshaw
- Thomas Selby (1885): TG Selby
- Steven Selwood (2001–2004): SA Selwood
- Arthur Severn (1919–1920): A Severn
- Frank Shacklock (1884–1885): FJ Shacklock
- Kasir Shah (1999–2000): KZ Shah
- Shahid Afridi (2003): Shahid Afridi
- Shan Masood (2022): Shan Masood
- Wilfred Shardlow (1925–1928): W Shardlow
- Safyaan Sharif (2018): SM Sharif
- Reg Sharma (1985–1989): Reg Sharma
- Phil Sharpe (1975–1976): PJ Sharpe
- Henry Shaw (1874–1884): H Shaw
- Kenneth Shearwood (1949): KA Shearwood
- Atif Sheikh (2009–2010): A Sheikh
- Mohammed Sheikh (2004–2006): MA Sheikh
- Arthur Sherwin (1908): AW Sherwin
- Charles Sherwin (1907): CB Sherwin
- Howard Sherwin (1937): H Sherwin
- William Shipton (1884–1893): WL Shipton
- David Short (1957–1960): JD Short
- Abraham Shuker (1873–1882): A Shuker
- Ryan Sidebottom: (2022) RN Sidebottom
- Alan Skinner (1931–1945): AF Skinner
- David Skinner (1947–1949): DA Skinner
- Richard Sladdin (1991–1994): RW Sladdin
- Archibald Slater (1911–1931): AG Slater
- Ben Slater (2011–2018): BT Slater
- Herbert Slater (1907): H Slater
- Henry Slater (1882–1887): H Slater
- Michael Slater (1998–1999): MJ Slater
- Daryn Smit (2017–2021): D Smit
- Alfort Smith (1873–1881): A Smith
- David Smith (1965–1971): DHK Smith
- Denis Smith (1927–1965): D Smith
- Edwin Smith (1951–1973): E Smith
- Greg Smith (2006–2011): GM Smith
- Harry Smith (1920): HW Smith
- John Smith (1870–1881): J Smith
- Lemuel Smith (1909): LST Smith
- Robert Smith (1871–1884): RP Smith
- Trevor Smith (1997–2001): TM Smith
- Willie Smith (1913): W Smith
- Maurice Snape (1949): MD Snape
- Matthew Sonczak (2017): MD Sonczak
- John Dunlop Southern (1919–1934): JD Southern
- Unwin Sowter (1870–1876): U Sowter
- Guy Sparrow (1905): GR Sparrow
- Harry Spencer (1895): H Spencer
- Ben Spendlove (1997–2005): BL Spendlove
- Fred Spofforth (1889–1891): FR Spofforth
- Billy Stanlake (2021): BJ Stanlake
- Ernest Stapleton (1902): E Stapleton
- David Steele (1979–1981): DS Steele
- Albert Steeples (1899): A Steeples
- Dick Steeples (1897): R Steeples
- Gary Steer (1992–1994): IGS Steer
- Bob Stephenson (1967–1968): GR Stephenson
- George Stevenson (1904): GS Stevenson
- Keith Stevenson (1973–1977): K Stevenson
- Mike Stevenson (1945–1952): MH Stevenson
- Bill Storer (1887–1905): W Storer
- Harry Storer junior (1920–1936): H Storer junior
- Harry Storer senior (1895): H Storer senior
- Henry Street (1887): H Street
- James Stubbings (1879–1893): J Stubbings
- Steve Stubbings (1997–2009): S.D Stubbings
- Walter Stubbings (1900): W Stubbings
- Henry Sugden (1881–1882): HE Sugden
- Frank Sugg (1884–1892): FH Sugg
- Walter Sugg (1884–1902): W Sugg
- Luke Sutton (2000–2011): LD Sutton
- Ray Swallow (1959–1963): R Swallow
- Frederick Swarbrook (1967–1980): FW Swarbrook
- Robert Swindell (1972–1977): RS Swindell
- Eric Sykes (1925–1932): E Sykes
- Adam Sylvester (2022): AR Sylvester (Note: Sylvester made his First-class debut in September 2022 against Glamorgan. He had previously played for the Derbyshire Second XI.)

== T ==
- Cecil Tate (1928): CF Tate
- Chris Taylor (2006–2007): CR Taylor
- David Taylor (2004): DK Taylor
- Francis Taylor (1908–1911): FH Taylor
- James Taylor (2017–2019): JPA Taylor
- Paul Taylor (1984–1986): JP Taylor
- Matthew Taylor (1994): M Taylor
- Bob Taylor (1961–1984): RW Taylor
- Tom Taylor (2014–2017): TAI Taylor
- William Taylor (1905–1910): WT Taylor
- Dominic Telo (2008–2009): FD Telo
- Shiv Thakor (2015–2017): SJ Thakor
- Reginald Ryder (1903): RT Ryder
- Paul Thomas (1999): PA Thomas
- William Thompson (1908): WH Thompson
- Alex Thomson (2021–2025): AT Thomson
- Frederick Thornhill (1876): F Thornhill
- Blair Tickner (2024–2025): BM Tickner
- John Tilson (1871–1876): J Tilson
- Stephen Titchard (1999–2001): SP Titchard
- Norman Todd (1906–1908): ND Todd
- John Tomlinson (1946): JDW Tomlinson
- Robert George Tomlinson (1891–1893): RG Tomlinson
- William Tomlinson (1920–1924): WJV Tomlinson
- Harry Topham (1881): HG Topham
- Arnold Townsend (1934–1950): AF Townsend
- Leslie Townsend (1922–1943): LF Townsend
- Fred Trueman (1972): FS Trueman
- Colin Tunnicliffe (1973–1984): CJ Tunnicliffe
- Herbert Turland (1921): H Turland
- Allen Turner (1920): A Turner
- Mark Turner (2011–2014): ML Turner
- Tim Tweats (1992–1999): TA Tweats
- John Tye (1874–1875): J Tye

== U ==
- Usman Khawaja (2011–2012): Usman Khawaja

== V ==
- Logan van Beek (2019–2021): LV van Beek
- Matthew Vandrau (1993–1997): MJ Vandrau
- Pat Vaulkhard (1946–1952): P Vaulkhard
- Srinivasaraghavan Venkataraghavan (1973–1975): S Venkataraghavan
- Hardus Viljoen (2017–2018): GC Viljoen

== W ==
- Graham Wagg (2006–2010): GG Wagg
- Mitchell Wagstaff (2021–2025): MD Wagstaff
- Wahab Riaz (2018): Wahab Riaz
- David Wainwright (2012–2015): DJ Wainwright
- Mark Wakefield (1987): M Wakefield
- George Walkden (1905–1906): GG Walkden
- George Glossop Walker (1881–1898): GG Walker
- Niel Walker (1931–1936): NAM Walker
- Nick Walker (2004–2005): NGE Walker
- Stanley Walker (1932): SG Walker
- William Wallis (1906): WA Wallis
- Conrad Wallroth (1878–1880): CA Wallroth
- John Walters (1977–1980): J Walters
- William Walton (1887–1893): W Walton
- Alan Ward (1966–1976): A Ward
- John Ward (1973–1975): JM Ward
- Leonard Ward (1899): LF Ward
- Christopher Warn (2002): CJ Warn
- Alan Warner (1985–1996): AE Warner
- Arnold Warren (1897–1920): A Warren
- Horace Wass (1929): H Wass
- Richard Watson (1947): RM Watson
- Mark Watt (2019–2023): MRJ Watt
- Andrew Watts (1982–1983): A Watts
- David Webster (1975): D Webster
- Frederick Webster (1906): F Webster
- William Webster (1911): W Webster
- Graeme Welch (2001–2006): G Welch
- Colin Wells (1994–1999): CM Wells
- Robin Weston (1998–1999): RMS Weston
- Phil Weston (2007): WPC Weston
- Lian Wharton (2000–2003): LJ Wharton
- Dan Wheeldon (2018): DM Wheeldon
- Harry White (2015): HJ White
- Wayne White (2005–2015): WA White
- Ross Whiteley (2008–2025): RA Whiteley
- Christopher Whyatt (1976): C Whyatt
- Archibald Wickstead (1911–1912): A Wickstead
- Albert Widdowson (1894): A Widdowson
- Harold Wild (1913–1920): H Wild
- David Wilde (1970–1972): D Wilde
- Chris Wilkins (1970–1972): CP Wilkins
- Guy Willatt (1950–1956): GL Willatt
- Arthur Wilmot (1871–1873): AA Wilmot
- William Wilmot (1897–1901): W Wilmot
- Gary Wilson (2017–2018): GC Wilson
- Guy Wilson (1902–1905): GD Wilson
- Robert Wincer (1978–1980): RC Wincer
- David Womble (1996): DR Womble
- Arthur Wood (1911–1912): AJ Wood
- Arthur Wood (1879): AM Wood
- Barry Wood (1980–1983): B Wood
- Lindsay Wood (1986): LJ Wood
- Thomas Wood (2016–2023): TA Wood
- Samuel Hill-Wood (1894–1902): SH Wood
- Albert Woodland (1920): AW Woodland
- William Wood-Sims (1878–1891): WW Wood-Sims
- Kenneth Woodward (1909): KA Woodward
- Anthony Woolley (1999): AP Woolley
- Stan Worthington (1924–1947): TS Worthington
- Frank Wright (1899): F Wright
- Henry FitzHerbert Wright (1891–1905): HF Wright
- John Wright (1977–1988): JG Wright
- James Wright (1898–1905): J Wright
- Levi Wright (1883–1909): LG Wright
- William Wright (1932): WJ Wright
- Gerald Wyatt (1954–1960): G Wyatt

== Y ==
- George Yates (1883): G Yates
- John Young (1899–1901): JH Young
- John Young (1894): JW Young
- Yousaf Bin Naeem (2024–2025): M Yousaf Bin Naeem

== Z ==
- Zaman Khan (2023): Zaman Khan

== See also ==
- List of Derbyshire County Cricket Club captains
