= Derbyshire County Cricket Club in 1907 =

1907 season of an English cricket team

Derbyshire County Cricket Club seasons
1907 season
- Captain: Levi Wright
- County Championship: 16
- Most runs: Levi Wright
- Most wickets: Samuel Cadman
- Most catches: Joe Humphries

Derbyshire County Cricket Club in 1907 represents the cricket season when the English club Derbyshire had been playing for thirty six years. It was their thirteenth season in the County Championship and they finished bottom of the table having won two matches in the season.

== 1907 season ==
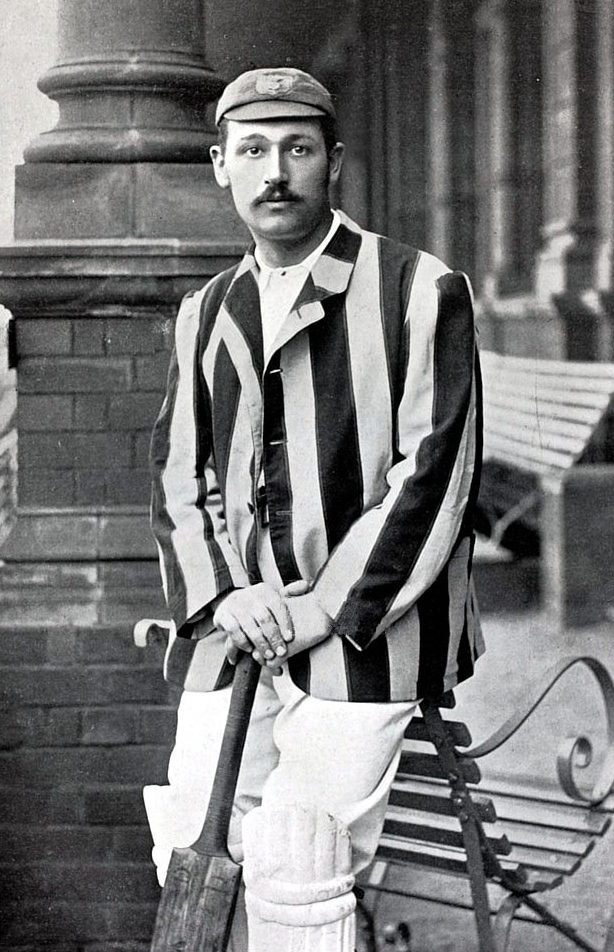
Levi Wright - captain

Derbyshire played 22 games in the County Championship, one match against the touring South Africans and one against MCC. They lost all but three of the played matches, which were two wins and a draw, and ended at the bottom of the Championship table.

Levi Wright was in his second season as captain and was also top scorer. Samuel Cadman took most wickets with 63. The most outstanding bowling performance was by Frederick Bracey against Northamptonshire at Derby when he took eleven wickets for a total of 45 runs.

Those who made their debut in the 1907 season were Henry Fletcher who also played two games in the following season, FG Peach who played one match and then next appeared in 1920 with occasional appearances to 1925, H Slater who played five matches only in the 1907 season and Charles Fleming and Charles Sherwin who each played one career first class match in 1907.

=== Matches ===
List of matches
No.	Date	V	Result	Margin	Notes
1	13 May 1907	MCC; Lord's Cricket Ground, St John's Wood	Lost	5 wickets	Trott 5-21 and 5-33
2	16 May 1907	Surrey; Kennington Oval	Lost	7 wickets	Knox 5-66
3	20 May 1907	Hampshire; County Ground, Southampton	Lost	7 wickets	
4	23 May 1907	Yorkshire; Bramall Lane, Sheffield	Abandoned		
5	27 May 1907	Kent; Queen's Park, Chesterfield	Lost	Innings and 100 runs	Fairservice 5-25 and 6-14; Bestwick 6-80
6	30 May 1907	Warwickshire; County Ground, Derby	Abandoned		
7	10 Jun 1907	Sussex; County Ground, Derby	Lost	8 wickets	Cox 8-58 and 5-29; Relf 5-30
8	13 Jun 1907	Essex; County Ground, Leyton	Lost	Innings and 90 runs	Mead 5-54 and 5-21; Buckenham 5-38
9	20 Jun 1907	South Africa; County Ground, Derby	Lost	Innings and 108 runs	Nourse 148; Snooke 114; FC Bracey 5-102; Vogler 6-17
10	27 Jun 1907	Northamptonshire; County Ground, Northampton	Lost	8 wickets	Thompson 5-52 and 7-42; A Morton 5-46
11	01 Jul 1907	Lancashire; Queen's Park, Chesterfield	Drawn		Hornby 125; A Warren 5-53; Dean 9-46
12	04 Jul 1907	Surrey; County Ground, Derby	Lost	Innings and 16 runs	W Smith 7-23
13	11 Jul 1907	Nottinghamshire; Trent Bridge, Nottingham	Lost	Innings and 107 runs	Wass 6-31; A Warren 5-63; Hallam 5-21
14	18 Jul 1907	Leicestershire; County Ground, Derby	Lost	9 wickets	Wood 133; Crawford 114; AE Lawton 106; W Bestwick 5-113; Jayes 5-58
15	22 Jul 1907	Northamptonshire; County Ground, Derby	Won	274 runs	AE Lawton 112; East 6-91; FC Bracey 5-9 and 6-36
16	25 Jul 1907	Yorkshire; North Road Ground, Glossop	Lost	Innings and 130 runs	Rhodes 6-22; SWA Cadman 5-82; Hirst 7-22
17	29 Jul 1907	Kent; Mote Park, Maidstone	Lost	Innings and 146 runs	Fielder 6-35 and 8-60
18	01 Aug 1907	Sussex; County Ground, Hove	Lost	10 wickets	CB Fry 197; A Warren 5-137; Relf 6-60
19	05 Aug 1907	Hampshire; At County Ground, Derby	Won	Innings and 93 runs	E Needham 119; SWA Cadman 6-41
20	08 Aug 1907	Leicestershire; Aylestone Road, Leicester	Lost	2 wickets	Odell 5-60; SWA Cadman 5-72
21	15 Aug 1907	Nottinghamshire; Queen's Park, Chesterfield	Lost	9 wickets	Wass 6-31; Hallam 5-55
22	19 Aug 1907	Warwickshire; Edgbaston, Birmingham	Lost	6 wickets	LG Wright 108; Santall 6-53
23	22 Aug 1907	Essex County Ground, Derby	Lost	222 runs	W Bestwick 6-55; Mead 6-21
24	26 Aug 1907	Lancashire; Old Trafford, Manchester	Lost	1 wicket	SWA Cadman 5-21; Heap 5-41

== Statistics ==
=== County Championship batting averages ===
Name	Matches	Inns	Runs	High score	Average	100s
LG Wright	20	38	810	108	21.89	1
SWA Cadman	19	36	614	80	17.05	0
A Morton	16	30	530	67	17.66	0
E Needham	15	28	499	119	17.82	1
J Humphries	20	38	461	50	13.17	0
A Warren	18	34	451	52	13.66	0
RB Rickman	16	29	442	68	16.37	0
CA Ollivierre	16	30	377	68	12.56	0
AE Lawton	4	7	376	112*	62.66	2
RM Carlin	10	19	239	37	13.27	0
FC Bracey	16	29	126	21	7.00	0
H Cooper	8	15	120	21	10.00	0
GM Buckston	5	10	92	27	9.20	0
W Bestwick	14	26	51	12	3.64	0
TH Hallam	4	7	44	17	6.28	0
H Slater	5	9	39	21	5.57	0
FC Hunter	3	6	32	21	5.33	0
H Fletcher	3	6	9	3	1.80	0
G Green	2	4	9	4	2.25	0
FG Peach	1	2	8	8	4.00	0
CB Sherwin	1	2	7	7	3.50	0
N Buxton	1	2	6	6	3.00	0
CB Fleming	1	2	5	3	2.50	0
I Dearnaley	1	2	3	3	1.50	0
HF Purdy	1	2	0	0	0.00	0

=== County Championship bowling averages ===
Name	Balls	Runs	Wickets	BB	Average
SWA Cadman	3348	1351	63	6-41	21.44
W Bestwick	2940	1328	61	6-55	21.77
A Warren	2391	1299	50	5-53	25.98
FC Bracey	1352	650	28	6-36	23.21
RB Rickman	1170	606	23	4-52	26.34
A Morton	779	432	19	5-46	22.73
AE Lawton	156	94	5	3-6	18.80
HF Purdy	57	16	4	4-16	4.00
H Slater	78	38	2	2-15	19.00
RM Carlin	145	116	2	1-3	58.00
J Humphries	3	5	1	1-5	5.00
FC Hunter	48	43	1	1-27	43.00
G Green	108	46	0		
CA Ollivierre	84	80	0		
N Buxton	66	24	0		

== Wicket Keeper ==
- J Humphries Catches 36 Stumping 4

== See also ==
- Derbyshire County Cricket Club seasons
- 1907 English cricket season
