= Derbyshire County Cricket Club in 1908 =

1908 season of an English cricket team

Derbyshire County Cricket Club seasons
1908 season
- Captain: Reginald Rickman
- County Championship: 14
- Most runs: Ernest Needham
- Most wickets: Billy Bestwick
- Most catches: Joe Humphries

Derbyshire County Cricket Club in 1908 was the cricket season when the English club Derbyshire had been playing for thirty-seven years. It was their fourteenth season in the County Championship and they won five matches to finish fourteenth in the Championship table.

== 1908 season ==
Derbyshire played twenty games in the County Championship and one match against the touring Gentlemen of Philadelphia. The captain for the year was Reginald Rickman. Ernest Needham was top scorer and Arnold Warren took most wickets.

The most significant additions to the Derbyshire squad in the season was Leonard Oliver who played regularly for Derbyshire until 1924. Also making their debuts were Richard Sale who played over five years, Francis Taylor who played over four years and Albert Howcroft who played over three years. Arthur Sherwin played several matches but only in the 1908 season and William Thompson and John Eyre played their single career matches in the season.

=== Matches ===
List of matches
No.	Date	V	Result	Margin	Notes
1	11 May 1908	Surrey; Kennington Oval	Lost	10 wickets	Marshal 7-41 and 5-32
2	18 May 1908	Sussex; County Ground, Derby	Lost	4 wickets	Cox 6-46
3	21 May 1908	Lancashire; Old Trafford, Manchester	Drawn		
4	28 May 1908	Yorkshire; Queen's Park, Chesterfield	Lost	196 runs	Hirst 128; Haigh 5-23
5	01 Jun 1908	Sussex; County Ground, Hove	Lost	17 runs	AE Relf 7-48 and 7-27;W Bestwick 7-50
6	04 Jun 1908	Kent; Private Banks Sports Ground, Catford Bridge	Lost	Innings and 18 runs	A Warren 8-78; Blythe 6-27
7	08 Jun 1908	Hampshire; County Ground, Southampton	Won	36 runs	Badcock 5-70 and 6-56; A Warren 5-98 and 6-62
8	11 Jun 1908	Surrey; County Ground, Derby	Lost	Innings and 26 runs	Crawford 104; SWA Cadman 5-51
9	18 Jun 1908	Northamptonshire; County Ground, Northampton	Lost	Innings and 46 runs	W Bestwick 6-87; Thompson 7-29; East 5-22
10	25 Jun 1908	Warwickshire; County Ground, Derby	Lost	10 wickets	Baker 119; LG Wright 111;Quaife 5-65
11	29 Jun 1908	Essex; Queen's Park, Chesterfield	Won	7 wickets	E Needham 104; A Warren 5-82 and 6-106; Reeves 5-59
12	02 Jul 1908	Kent; County Ground, Derby	Lost	Innings and 234 runs	Hardinge 127; Seymour 171; Hutchings 102; A Warren 6-191
13	06 Jul 1908	Nottinghamshire; Trent Bridge, Nottingham	Drawn		Wass 5-71
14	20 Jul 1908	Leicestershire; County Ground, Derby	Lost	141 runs	W Bestwick 5-59 and 6-46; Astill 6-31 and 7-30
15	23 Jul 1908	Essex; County Ground, Leyton	Lost	6 wickets	E Needham 107 and 104; Benham 5-47; Buckenham 6-63
16	27 Jul 1908	Yorkshire; Headingley, Leeds	Lost	Innings and 131 runs	Wilson 109; Newstead 6-43
17	03 Aug 1908	Hampshire; County Ground, Derby	Won	126 runs	Badcock 7-55; SWA Cadman 5-41
18	06 Aug 1908	Leicestershire; Aylestone Road, Leicester	Drawn		A Warren 6-97 and 6-109; Woodcock 5-102
19	10 Aug 1908	Lancashire; North Road Ground, Glossop	Drawn		Dean 5-75; Bracey 5-66; A Warren 6-28
20	13 Aug 1908	Nottinghamshire; Queen's Park, Chesterfield	Won	36 runs	Hallam 5-64; W Bestwick 5-78 and 5-42; Wass 5-82
21	17 Aug 1908	Gentlemen of Philadelphia; County Ground, Derby	Lost	9 wickets	King 7-28 and 5-88
22	24 Aug 1908	Warwickshire; Edgbaston, Birmingham	Lost	Innings and 49 runs	Quaife 131; SWA Cadman 101; W Bestwick 5-114; Field 5-57
23	27 Aug 1908	Northamptonshire; County Ground, Derby	Won	129 runs	East 5-50 and 6-84; Thompson 5-50; A Morton 5-14

== Statistics ==
=== County Championship batting averages ===
Name	Matches	Inns	Runs	High score	Average	100s
E Needham	22	44	1122	107*	28.76	3
SWA Cadman	19	37	942	101	26.91	1
AE Lawton	14	27	606	69	22.44	0
A Morton	22	42	806	87	20.66	0
LG Wright	21	42	821	111	20.02	1
J Humphries	22	41	491	52*	14.44	0
R Sale	6	12	147	32	13.36	0
RB Rickman	19	35	400	35	11.76	0
A Warren	22	40	423	68	11.13	0
L Oliver	17	30	310	42	10.33	0
WH Thompson	1	2	17	17	8.50	0
RM Carlin	4	7	57	21	8.14	0
AW Sherwin	11	21	152	24	8.00	0
FH Taylor	2	4	31	17	7.75	0
A Howcroft	2	4	29	19	7.25	0
W Bestwick	21	39	139	18	6.04	0
HF Purdy	4	8	30	14*	6.00	0
FC Bracey	11	18	74	9*	5.28	0
H Fletcher	2	4	8	4	2.66	0

Leading first-class batsmen for Derbyshire by runs scored
Name	Mat	Inns	Runs	HS	Ave	100
E Needham	23	46	1178	107*	25.60 (a)	3
SWA Cadman	19	37	942	101	26.91	1
LG Wright	22	44	855	111	19.43 (a)	1
A Morton	23	44	827	87	18.79 (a)	0
AE Lawton	15	29	655	69	22.59 (a)	0

(a) Figures adjusted for non CC matches

J Eyre and N Todd also played for Derbyshire in the match against Gentlemen of Philadelphia.

=== County Championship bowling averages ===
Name	Balls	Runs	Wickets	BB	Average
A Warren	4549	2221	104	8-78	21.35
W Bestwick	5183	2187	101	7-50	21.65
SWA Cadman	3255	1061	55	5-41	19.29
A Morton	1326	635	24	5-14	26.45
FC Bracey	1065	543	23	5-66	23.60 0
AE Lawton	778	437	17	4-19	25.70
RB Rickman	384	208	2	1-4	104.00
HF Purdy	252	137	1	1-52	137.00
RM Carlin	66	39	1	1-20	39.00
J Humphries	18	8	0		
E Needham	18	11	0		
R Sale	12	10	0		

Leading first class bowlers for Derbyshire by wickets taken
Name	Balls	Runs	Wkts	BBI	Ave
A Warren	4615	2269	105	8-78	21.61
W Bestwick	5263	2245	103	7-50	21.79
SWA Cadman	3255	1061	55	5-41	19.29
A Morton	1440	696	27	5-14	25.78
FC Bracey	1065	543	23	5-66	23.60

== Wicket Keeping ==
- Joe Humphries Catches 55, Stumping 5

== See also ==
- Derbyshire County Cricket Club seasons
- 1908 English cricket season
