= Derbyshire County Cricket Club in 1905 =

1905 season of an English cricket team

Derbyshire County Cricket Club seasons
1905 season
- Captain: Albert Lawton
- County Championship: 14
- Most runs: Levi Wright
- Most wickets: Billy Bestwick
- Most catches: Joe Humphries

Derbyshire County Cricket Club in 1905 was the cricket season when the English club Derbyshire had been playing for thirty-four years. It was their eleventh season in the County Championship and they won three matches to finish fourteenth in the Championship table.

== 1905 season ==
Derbyshire played twenty games in the County Championship, one match against MCC and one against the touring Australians. The captain for the year was Albert Lawton. Levi Wright was top scorer with over 1700 runs and four centuries and Billy Bestwick took most wickets with over 100. However lacking greater depth, Derbyshire won just three matches in the County Championship and lost 16 which put them at fourteenth in the table.

The most significant addition to the Derbyshire squad in the season was George Buckston who though playing only one match in the 1905 season went on to become captain. Also making their debuts were Frederic Hunter who played regularly for three years and Herbert Cooper William Taylor and Robert Carlin who played intermittently over five years. Arthur Hogg, John McDonald and George Walkden played in 1905 and also in 1906. Other players who made their debut but played only in 1905 were George Maltby three matches, Joseph Cupitt George Marples and Guy Sparrow two matches and William Peach and William Bagguley one match each.

James Wright who had played in 1898 played his last single match in the season.

=== Matches ===
List of matches
No.	Date	V	Result	Margin	Notes
1	15 May 1905	Yorkshire; Park Avenue Cricket Ground, Bradford	Lost	Innings and 61 runs	FS Jackson 111; W Bestwick 5-91
2	18 May 1905	Lancashire; County Ground, Derby	Lost	161 runs	SWA Cadman 6-27; I'Anson 5-52; Kermode 5-81
3	22 May 1905	Essex; County Ground, Leyton	Lost	Innings and 1 run	AE Lawton 112; McGahey 277; Tremlin 9–126; A Warren 5–139; Buckenham 6-59
4	01 Jun 1905	Sussex; County Ground, Derby	Drawn		LG Wright 149; A Warren 6-78; Cox 6-108
5	12 Jun 1905	Hampshire; County Ground, Southampton	Lost	188 runs	Bowell 101; W Bestwick 6-74; Hesketh-Pritchard 5-46 and 8-32
6	15 Jun 1905	Yorkshire; County Ground, Derby	Won	9 wickets	A Warren 7-57 and 5-69; Ringrose 6-78
7	19 Jun 1905	Northamptonshire; County Ground, Northampton	Lost	23 runs	GJ Thompson 5-66; East 6-33
8	22 Jun 1905	Surrey; Kennington Oval	Lost	236 runs	Goatly 147; Lees 6-59; W Bestwick 5-67; Knox 5-50
9	26 Jun 1905	Essex; North Road Ground, Glossop	Lost	7 wickets	AJ Turner 103; W Bestwick 6-39; Tremlin 5-58
10	03 Jul 1905	Leicestershire; Queen's Park, Chesterfield	Lost	Innings and 135 runs	CJB Wood 100; Odell 6-15 and 5-29; King 5-39
11	06 Jul 1905	Nottinghamshire; Trent Bridge, Nottingham	Lost	8 wickets	Hallam 6-48
12	10 Jul 1905	Australians; County Ground, Derby	Lost	105 runs	SWA Cadman 5-94; Armstrong 5-29; Cotter 6-63
13	17 Jul 1905	MCC; Lord's Cricket Ground, St John's Wood	Lost	Innings and 252 runs	TC O'Brien 153; CAL Payne 191; Trott 6-66
14	20 Jul 1905	Northamptonshire; County Ground, Derby	Won	Innings and 50 runs	LG Wright 195; East 5–127; A Warren 5-23; W Bestwick 5-23 and 7-108
15	24 Jul 1905	Warwickshire; Edgbaston, Birmingham	Lost	7 wickets	LG Wright 176 and 122; Quaife 176; W Bestwick 5-105
16	27 Jul 1905	Leicestershire; Aylestone Road, Leicester	Lost	87 runs	King 5-46; Jayes 9-78
17	31 Jul 1905	Warwickshire; County Ground, Derby	Won	Innings and 120 runs	SWA Cadman 5-34 and 6-46; Santall 5-75
18	07 Aug 1905	Hampshire; County Ground, Derby	Drawn		Llewellyn 102 and 100; W Bestwick 5-89 and 6-53; Ede 7-72
19	10 Aug 1905	Sussex; County Ground, Hove	Lost	Innings and 41 runs	
20	14 Aug 1905	Surrey; County Ground, Derby	Lost	9 wickets	Hayes 189; Crawford 119; EM Ashcroft 145; Lees 5-87
21	17 Aug 1905	Lancashire; Old Trafford, Manchester	Drawn		AE Lawton 101; Poideven 102; Kermode 5–117; SWA Cadman 6-83
22	21 Aug 1905	Nottinghamshire; County Ground, Derby	Lost	6 wickets	W Bestwick 5-90; Wass 8-97

== Statistics ==
=== County Championship batting averages ===
Name	Matches	Inns	Runs	High score	Average	100s
LG Wright	20	38	1651	195	43.44	4
EM Ashcroft	16	29	838	145	31.03	1
AE Lawton	14	26	740	112	28.46	2
HF Wright	6	10	202	55	22.44	0
SWA Cadman	19	34	690	63	21.56	0
G Curgenven	4	7	139	47	19.85	0
CA Ollivierre	20	37	700	93	19.44	0
GR Sparrow	2	4	75	64	18.75	0
JA McDonald	1	2	36	21	18.00	0
E Needham	3	6	85	33	17.00	0
A Warren	19	34	482	49*	15.54	0
A Morton	17	32	419	73	14.44	0
FC Hunter	12	20	242	50*	14.23	0
GM Buckston	1	1	13	13	13.00	0
J Humphries	20	34	234	22	12.31	0
I Dearnaley	2	4	46	34	11.50	0
J Cupitt	2	4	19	13	9.50	0
W Storer	8	14	120	31	9.23	0
GG Walkden	4	8	51	27	6.37	0
WT Taylor	1	2	11	9	5.50	0
W Bagguley	1	1	5	5	5.00	0
W Peach	1	2	10	10	5.00	0
G Maltby	3	6	22	7*	4.40	0
W Bestwick	19	33	104	20	3.85	0
J Wright	1	2	6	6	3.00	0
A Hogg	1	2	1	1	0.50	0
O Burton	2	2	3	2*		0
H Cooper	1	2	0	0	0.00	0

Leading first-class batsmen for Derbyshire by runs scored
Name	Mat	Inns	Runs	HS	Ave	100
LG Wright	21	40	1716	195	42.90	4
EM Ashcroft	17	313	879	145	28.35	1
SWA Cadman	21	38	778	66	20.47	0
CA Ollivierre	22	41	741	93	18.07	0
AE Lawton	14	26	740	112	28.46	2

(a) Figures adjusted for non CC matches

Additionally, GH Wilson, RM Carlin and GH Marples played against MCC. Marples also played against the Australians

=== County Championship bowling averages ===
Name	Balls	Runs	Wickets	BB	Average
W Bestwick	4147	2020	100	7-108	20.20
A Warren	3559	1982	77	7-57	25.74
SWA Cadman	2530	1093	50	6-27	21.86
A Morton	1484	652	29	4-11	22.48
W Storer	528	383	12	3-74	31.91
AE Lawton	469	301	11	3-19	27.36
FC Hunter	678	408	9	2-21	45.33
CA Ollivierre	354	186	8	3-34	23.25
W Peach	64	46	4	4-46	11.50
O Burton	142	101	3	2-67	33.66
J Cupitt	450	145	3	2-24	48.33
G Curgenven	198	99	1	1-34	99.00
EM Ashcroft	126	113	0		
G Maltby	30	20	0		
WT Taylor	24	15	0		

Leading first class bowlers for Derbyshire by wickets taken
Name	Balls	Runs	Wkts	BBI	Ave
W Bestwick	4391	2286	104	7-108	21.98
A Warren	3559	1982	77	7-57	25.74 5 2
SWA Cadman	2986	1371	58	6-27	23.64
A Morton	1740	800	37	4-11	21.62
W Storer	528	383	12	3-74	31.91 0 0

== Wicket Keeping ==
- Joe Humphries Catches 45, Stumping 5

== See also ==
- Derbyshire County Cricket Club seasons
- 1905 English cricket season
