= Derbyshire County Cricket Club in 1903 =

1903 season of an English cricket team

Derbyshire County Cricket Club seasons
1903 season
- Captain: Albert Lawton
- County Championship: 12
- Most runs: Levi Wright
- Most wickets: Billy Bestwick
- Most catches: Joe Humphries

Derbyshire County Cricket Club in 1903 was the cricket season when the English club Derbyshire celebrated its 32nd anniversary. It was their ninth season in the County Championship and they won five matches to come in twelfth.

== 1903 season ==
Derbyshire played sixteen games in the County Championship, in addition to two matches against W.G. Grace's London County Cricket Club and one against MCC. They won four matches in the Championship and one against London County.

The captain for the year was Albert Lawton in his second season as captain. Levi Wright was top scorer and Billy Bestwick took most wickets.

An addition to the Derbyshire side was Arthur Morton who played for the club until 1926. Other new players in the season were R T Ryder who played his one career first class match against London County, and G Green who also made one appearance against London County but played for Derbyshire intermittently over several seasons.

=== Matches ===
List of matches
No.	Date	V	Result	Margin	Notes
1	11 May 1903	Nottinghamshire; Trent Bridge, Nottingham	Lost	6 wickets	Wass 5-43
2	18 May 1903	Lancashire; County Ground, Derby	Lost	10 wickets	Barnes 7-25 and 7-34; JJ Hulme 8-52
3	21 May 1903	MCC; Lord's Cricket Ground, St John's Wood	Lost	9 wickets	Llewellyn 5-65; JJ Hulme 6-60; Thompson 5-30
4	01 Jun 1903	Hampshire; County Ground, Southampton	Lost	261 runs	Llewellyn 148; Hill 150; JJ Hulme 7-123; Chignell 5-68; Hesketh-Pritchard 7-47
5	08 Jun 1903	Essex; County Ground, Leyton	Drawn		Perrin 102(rh); Buckenham 6-47; W Bestwick 5-95; Mead 5-77
6	15 Jun 1903	Surrey; Queen's Park, Chesterfield	Won	111 runs	W Bestwick 7-20; Richardson 5-43
7	18 Jun 1903	Yorkshire; County Ground, Derby	Lost	7 wickets	JJ Hulme 5-69
8	22 Jun 1903	Warwickshire; Edgbaston, Birmingham	Drawn		LG Wright 133; Field 6-82 and 5-150
9	25 Jun 1903	Leicestershire; County Ground, Derby	Won	35 runs	Gill 5-93; A Warren 5-69 and 6-112
10	06 Jul 1903	Leicestershire; Aylestone Road, Leicester	Lost	126 runs	King 167; Odell 6-74
11	09 Jul 1903	Nottinghamshire; County Ground, Derby	Won	114 runs	SWA Cadman 5-42; A Warren 6-93
12	16 Jul 1903	London County Cricket Club; Crystal Palace Park	Lost	Innings and 31 runs	W Smith 123; Cranfield 7-105
13	20 Jul 1903	Essex; North Road Ground, Glossop	Lost	232 runs	Mead 5-38
14	03 Aug 1903	Hampshire; County Ground, Derby	Won	Innings and 59 runs	E Needham 131; A Warren 6-43
15	06 Aug 1903	Lancashire; Old Trafford, Manchester	Lost	9 wickets	LG Wright 116; Hallows 5-42
16	10 Aug 1903	Surrey; Kennington Oval	Drawn		Dowson 100*
17	13 Aug 1903	Yorkshire; St George's Road, Harrogate	Drawn		
18	17 Aug 1903	Warwickshire; Queen's Park, Chesterfield	Drawn		W Bestwick 5-86; Hargreave 5-55; Santall 5-19
19	20 Aug 1903	London County Cricket Club; County Ground, Derby	Won	8 wickets	Odell 7-69

== Statistics ==
=== County Championship batting averages ===
Name	Matches	Inns	Runs	High score	Average	100s
LG Wright	15	27	940	133	37.60	2
CA Ollivierre	16	30	660	72	22.75	0
W Storer	15	27	593	89	21.96	0
E Needham	14	25	470	131	20.43	1
AE Lawton	16	27	473	63	18.19	0
SWA Cadman	11	18	309	55	17.16	0
W Ellis	4	8	121	44	15.12	0
EM Ashcroft	7	11	142	67	14.20	0
A Warren	16	28	382	89	14.14	0
T Forrester	8	16	186	58	12.40	0
A Morton	5	10	94	22	10.44	0
J Humphries	16	27	208	24	9.45	0
GR Gregory	7	11	85	20*	9.44	0
JJ Hulme	8	15	64	27*	5.33	0
W Bestwick	16	27	68	19*	4.53	0
R Else	2	4	8	5	2.66	0

In addition, W Locker played against MCC, CE Middleton and G Curgenven played in the first match against London County, and R T Ryder and G Green played in the second match against London County.

=== County Championship bowling averages ===
Name	Balls	Runs	Wickets	BB	Average
W Bestwick	3758	1599	66	7-20	24.22
A Warren	2630	1395	65	6-43	21.46
JJ Hulme	1460	724	36	8-52	20.11
SWA Cadman	1295	560	19	5-42	29.47
W Storer	470	307	13	3-29	23.61
GR Gregory	270	195	10	4-70	19.50
AE Lawton	600	334	9	2-31	37.11
T Forrester	489	250	6	4-43	41.66
A Morton	258	145	2	2-32	72.50
EM Ashcroft	24	15	0		
CA Ollivierre	12	9	0		
R Else	12	5	0		

=== County Championship Wicket keeping ===
- Joe Humphries Catches 23, Stumping 9

== See also ==
- Derbyshire County Cricket Club seasons
- 1903 English cricket season
