= Derbyshire County Cricket Club in 1906 =

1906 season of an English cricket team

Derbyshire County Cricket Club seasons
1906 season
- Captain: Levi Wright
- County Championship: 16
- Most runs: Levi Wright
- Most wickets: Billy Bestwick
- Most catches: Joe Humphries

Derbyshire County Cricket Club in 1906 represents the cricket season when the English club Derbyshire had been playing for thirty five years. It was their twelfth season in the County Championship and they finished bottom of the table having won two matches in the County Championship.

== 1906 season ==
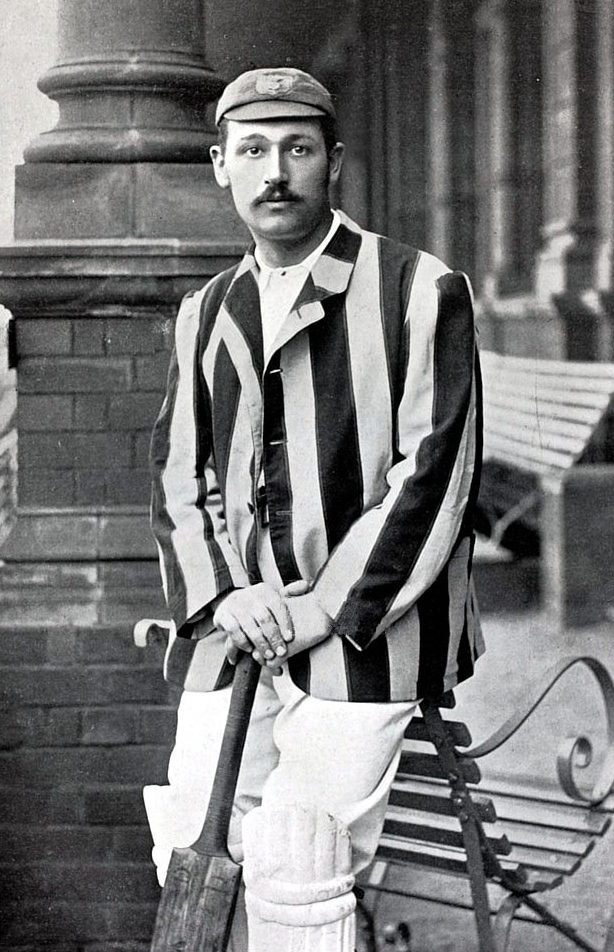
Levi Wright - captain

Derbyshire played 20 games in the County Championship, one match against the touring West Indians and one against MCC.

Levi Wright was in his first season as captain. Wright was top scorer, although Maynard Ashcroft had a better average and scored two centuries. Billy Bestwick took most wickets with 111 .

Reginald Rickman, a future captain, made his debut and also Henry Purdy and Frederick Bracey who played several seasons. Thomas Hallam and Norman Todd appeared in 1906 and one more season each.

=== Matches ===
List of matches
No.	Date	V	Result	Margin	Notes
1	10 May 1906	MCC; Lord's Cricket Ground, St John's Wood	Lost	5 wickets	Not a County Championship match Mead 7-29
2	21 May 1906	Lancashire; County Ground, Derby	Lost	103 runs	Kermode 7-101 and 6-73
3	24 May 1906	Leicestershire; Aylestone Road, Leicester	Lost	252 runs	A Warren 5-69; W Bestwick 5-78
4	28 May 1906	Sussex; County Ground, Hove	Lost	88 runs	W Bestwick 7-49; Relf 7-44; Dwyer 9-35
5	31 May 1906	Essex; County Ground, Leyton	Lost	209 runs	Turner 104*; W Bestwick 6-61 and 6-82; Buckenham 5-46; Mead 7-13
6	04 Jun 1906	Hampshire; County Ground, Southampton	Lost	147 runs	Hill 110; W Bestwick 7-102; A Warren6-82; Badcock 6-63
7	07 Jun 1906	Yorkshire; Queen's Park, Chesterfield	Lost	33 runs	Hirst 5-30; W Bestwick 5-76; S Haigh 5-43
8	11 Jun 1906	Leicestershire; North Road Ground, Glossop	Won	Innings and 50 runs	King 126*; CA Ollivierre 157; A Warren5-81; W Bestwick 6-67
9	18 Jun 1906	Warwickshire; County Ground, Derby	Lost	Innings and 16 runs	A Warren 5-70; Hargreave 7-34 and 6-68;
10	25 Jun 1906	Nottinghamshire; County Ground, Derby	Lost	10 wickets	Gunn 7-75; A Warren 6-104
11	28 Jun 1906	Northamptonshire; County Ground, Northampton	Lost	10 wickets	East 7-22; W Bestwick 5-61; Thompson 9-64;
12	02 Jul 1906	Surrey; Queen's Park, Chesterfield	Lost	10 wickets	J Crawford 7-86; Lees 7-33
13	05 Jul 1906	Sussex; At County Ground, Derby	Won	5 wickets	Killick 125; EM Ashcroft100*; Cox 5-92; W Bestwick 7-49
14	12 Jul 1906	Nottinghamshire; Trent Bridge, Nottingham	Lost	5 wickets	A Hallam 6-40;
15	16 Jul 1906	Yorkshire; Bramall Lane, Sheffield	Lost	10 wickets	W Bestwick 5-71
16	19 Jul 1906	West Indians; At County Ground, Derby	Won	6 wickets	Not a County Championship match
17	06 Aug 1906	Hampshire; At County Ground, Derby	Lost	160 runs	Badcock 5-59; Wyatt 5-50
18	09 Aug 1906	Warwickshire; Edgbaston, Birmingham	Drawn		
19	13 Aug 1906	Northamptonshire; Queen's Park, Chesterfield	Lost	Innings and 85 runs	Pretty 200; HF Purdy 6-84; Thompson 5-68
20	20 Aug 1906	Essex At County Ground, Derby	Lost	6 wickets	EM Ashcroft 118; W Bestwick 6-65; Buckenham 6-58
21	23 Aug 1906	Lancashire; Old Trafford, Manchester	Lost	Innings and 84 runs	Hallows 110
22	27 Aug 1906	Surrey; Kennington Oval	Lost	10 wickets	A Warren 6-140; Lees 6-72

== Statistics ==
=== County Championship batting averages ===
Name	Matches	Inns	Runs	High score	Average	100s
EM Ashcroft	14	27	886	118	34.07	2
LG Wright	20	39	929	96	24.44	0
CA Ollivierre	14	27	655	157	24.25	1
E Needham	16	31	687	75	22.90	0
GM Buckston	8	16	326	96	20.37	0
J Humphries	20	39	565	68	19.48	0
SWA Cadman	20	39	692	94	18.70	0
A Morton	18	34	580	77	18.70	0
AE Lawton	2	4	62	52	15.50	0
TH Hallam	6	12	180	68	15.00	0
H Cooper	2	4	45	23	15.00	0
A Warren	19	37	490	52	14.00	0
JH Purdy	1	2	11	9*	11.00	0
FC Hunter	9	15	160	51	10.66	0
GG Walkden	1	1	8	8	8.00	0
FC Bracey	3	6	39	28	7.80	0
RB Rickman	11	21	148	31	7.78	0
W Ellis	1	2	13	10	6.50	0
GR Gregory	1	2	13	11	6.50	0
W Bestwick	19	35	127	21	6.35	0
HF Purdy	8	16	100	21	6.25	0
F Webster	1	2	11	10	5.50	0
JA McDonald	2	4	21	19	5.25	0
AP Boissier	1	2	7	4	3.50	0
A Hogg	2	4	4	4	1.00	0
ND Todd	1	2	0	0	0.00	0

=== County Championship bowling averages ===
Name	Balls	Runs	Wickets	BB	Average
W Bestwick	4489	2019	111	7-49	18.18
A Warren	3780	2249	83	6-82	27.09
SWA Cadman	3358	1536	40	4-80	38.40
HF Purdy	1037	445	20	6-84	22.25
RB Rickman	907	432	15	3-16	28.80
A Morton	900	516	12	4-37	43.00
FC Hunter	170	148	4	2-18	37.00
FC Bracey	187	134	3	3-49	44.66
EM Ashcroft	270	166	3	2-12	55.33
JH Purdy	48	30	1	1-30	30.00
F Webster	126	65	1	1-65	65.00
AE Lawton	72	41	0		
W Ellis	42	15	0		
GR Gregory	6	0	0		
CA Ollivierre	5	8	0		
J Humphries	4	4	0		

== Wicket Keeper ==
- J Humphries Catches 61 Stumping 6

== See also ==
- Derbyshire County Cricket Club seasons
- 1906 English cricket season
