= Will Taylor (Derbyshire cricketer) =

English cricketer

Personal information
- Full name: William Thomas Taylor
- Born: 14 April 1885; Hopton, Derbyshire, England
- Died: 17 August 1976 (aged 91); Breadsall, Derbyshire, England
- Batting: Right-handed
- Bowling: Right-arm medium
- Relatives: Francis Taylor (brother)

Domestic team information
- Years: Team
- 1905–1910: Derbyshire
- FC debut: 6 July 1905 Derbyshire v Nottinghamshire
- Last FC: 9 June 1910 Derbyshire v Surrey

Career statistics
Competition	First-class
Matches	4
Runs scored	53
Batting average	7.57
100s/50s	0/0
Top score	11
Balls bowled	77
Wickets	2
Bowling average	28.00
5 wickets in innings	0
10 wickets in match	0
Best bowling	1/9
Catches/stumpings	2/–
- Source: CricketArchive, February 2012

William Thomas Taylor (14 April 1885 – 17 August 1976) was an English cricketer who played for Derbyshire between 1905 and 1910. He served as secretary of Derbyshire for 51 years from 1908 to 1959.

Taylor was born at Hopton, Derbyshire and lived in Wirksworth as the son of Walter Taylor of Fern House and his wife Alice. His father was a manufacturer of artificial fertilizer.

Taylor made his Derbyshire debut during the 1905 season, against Nottinghamshire but made little impression. In the 1906 season, he played a match during a West Indian tour of England, when he took two wickets, one of them being of Lebrun Constantine. Taylor played two games during the 1910 season, probably as a substitute, in which he was able to keep up his consistency between Test cricketer Arnold Warren and pre-war Derbyshire representative Frederick Bracey. Taylor was a right-handed batsman who played 8 innings in 4 matches with a top score of 11 and an average of 7.57. He was a right-arm medium-pace bowler and took 2 wickets at an average of 28.

On 8 August 1908, Taylor became secretary of Derbyshire County Cricket Club, when he was described in the Derbyshire Cricket Guide as "(An) enthusiastic worker of a firm but courteous disposition who is likely to prove a successful official, combining the advantages of a good business training with an intimate knowledge of cricket and cricketers". He often accompanied the XI to away matches and acted as scorer and substitute. He went on to serve the club for over 51 years, turning down an invitation to act as secretary for Lancashire in 1932. During the First World War he reached the rank of captain before he was badly wounded. He would have been the manager of the MCC side to South Africa in 1927 had Guy Jackson been able to lead it.

In 1953, his History of Derbyshire Cricket was published in Wisden. He retired as secretary on 31 December 1959 after 51 years and 149 days. After his retirement, he was appointed to the committee, and was Honorary Secretary from 1962 to 1972. It was said of him "Few men have done so much for cricket". MCC elected him as life member, the only county secretary to be elected while still in office.

Taylor died in Breadsall at the age of 91. His brother, Francis Taylor, five years his junior, also played first-class cricket for Derbyshire although they never played in the same match. His two other brothers died in the First World War.
