= Thomas Hallam =

Thomas Hallam may refer to:

- Thomas Hallam (cricketer)
- Thomas Hallam (actor)
