= Walkden (surname) =

Walkden is a surname. Notable people with the surname include:

- Alexander Walkden, 1st Baron Walkden (1873–1951), British trade union leader and Labour politician
- Bianca Walkden (born 1991), British taekwondo practitioner
- Christine Walkden (born 1955), British television presenter and gardener
- Christopher Walkden (1938-2011), British Olympic swimmer
- Evelyn Walkden (1893-1970), British politician and trade unionist
- George Walkden (1883-1923), English cricketer who played first class cricket for Derbyshire
- Pat Walkden (born 1946), South African female tennis player
- Peter Walkden (1684–1769), English Presbyterian minister and diarist
