= William Bagguley =

English cricketer

Personal information
- Full name: William Bagguley
- Born: 9 September 1866; Ruddington, England
- Died: 18 April 1936 (aged 69); Standard Hill, Nottinghamshire, England
- Relatives: Robert Bagguley

Domestic team information
- Years: Team
- 1905: Derbyshire
- First-class debut: 1 June 1905 Derbyshire v Sussex

Career statistics
Competition	First-class
Matches	1
Runs scored	5
Batting average	5.00
100s/50s	/
Top score	5
Balls bowled
Wickets
Bowling average
5 wickets in innings
10 wickets in match
Best bowling
Catches/stumpings	0/-
- Source: , July 2012

William Bagguley (9 September 1866 – 18 April 1936) was an English cricketer who played for Derbyshire in 1905.

Bagguley was born in Ruddington, the son of Robert Bagguley, a stocking framework knitter and his wife Martha. Bagguley followed his father's occupation from a young age.

Bagguley made a single first-class appearance for Derbyshire, during the 1905 season, against Sussex. From the lower order, he scored 5 runs in the only innings in which he batted.

Bagguley died in Standard Hill, Nottinghamshire. His brothers, Robert and Percy Bagguley also played cricket, the former for Nottinghamshire and the latter for Nottinghamshire Colts.
