= George Green (cricketer) =

English cricketer

Personal information
- Full name: George Green
- Born: 13 April 1880; Hasland, Derbyshire, England
- Died: 25 November 1940 (aged 60); Clay Cross, England
- Bowling: Left arm medium pace bowler

Domestic team information
- Years: Team
- 1903–1907: Derbyshire
- First-class debut: 20 August 1903 Derbyshire v London County
- Last First-class: 25 July 1907 Derbyshire v Yorkshire

Career statistics
Competition	First-class
Matches	6
Runs scored	39
Batting average	3.54
100s/50s	/
Top score	20
Balls bowled	434
Wickets	6
Bowling average	39.33
5 wickets in innings
10 wickets in match
Best bowling	2-31
Catches/stumpings	2/-
- Source: , June 2012

George Green (13 April 1880 – 25 November 1940) was an English first-class cricketer who played for Derbyshire between 1903 and 1907.

Green was born at Hasland, Derbyshire, the son of William Green a general labourer and his wife Mary Ann. He made his debut for Derbyshire in the 1903 season against London County in August, when he scored a duck in his only innings and bowled four overs without a wicket. He played two matches in the 1904 season when he bowled 2 for 40 against Nottinghamshire and made his top score of 20 against Surrey. In the 1906 season he played one game against Marylebone Cricket Club (MCC), when he took 2 for 31. He played two final matches in the 1907 season in which he made low scores and took no wickets.

Green played eleven innings in six first-class matches with an average of 3.54 and a top score of 20. He was a left-arm medium pace bowler and took 6 first-class wickets at an average of 39.33 and a best performance of 2 for 31.

Green died at Clay Cross, Derbyshire at the age of 60,
