= George Buckston =

English cricketer

Personal information
- Full name: George Moreton Buckston
- Born: 12 March 1881; Hope, Derbyshire, England
- Died: 24 November 1942 (aged 61); Sutton-on-the-Hill, England
- Batting: Right-handed
- Role: Batsman
- Relatives: Robin Buckston (son)

Domestic team information
- Years: Team
- 1903: Cambridge University
- 1905–1921: Derbyshire
- FC debut: 8 June 1903 Cambridge Univ. v Gentlemen of Philadelphia
- Last FC: 13 August 1921 Derbyshire v Leicestershire

Career statistics
Competition	First-class
Matches	39
Runs scored	852
Batting average	11.83
100s/50s	0/4
Top score	96
Catches/stumpings	8/1
- Source: CricketArchive, 12 February 2010

George Moreton Buckston (12 March 1881 – 24 November 1942) was an English cricketer who played first-class cricket for Cambridge University in 1903, Marylebone Cricket Club (MCC) and Derbyshire between 1905 and 1921.

Buckston was born in Hope, Derbyshire and was educated at Eton and at Trinity College, Cambridge. He scored 45 and 4 for Eton v Harrow at Lord's in 1900. He played for Cambridge University from the 1903 season during which he played five games. He played one first-class game for MCC in 1904 which was against Derbyshire and then joined Derbyshire in the 1905 season. Buckston made his County Championship debut for Derbyshire against Northamptonshire. Derbyshire won the match by an innings margin, Northamptonshire limited to just 52 runs in their first innings. Buckston played no further matches during the 1905 season, and Derbyshire finished third-bottom in the Championship.

Buckston played a greater role during the 1906 season, playing eight County Championship games, and making his career-high total score of 96, though Derbyshire finished bottom of the table, and Buckston played the 1907 season at the club.

Buckston served in the First World War as a Derbyshire Yeomanry captain in Salonica. He ended the war with malaria.

Buckston returned to the Derbyshire team in the 1920 season. He played as an opening batsman seeing off competition for the position from Leonard Oliver who was deputising for the captain John Chapman for much of the season.

Derbyshire lost 17 of the 18 matches, with one abandoned, in 1920. Buckston offered to take over the captaincy for 1921. Under him, Derbyshire won five of their matches and rose to the 12th (out of 16) position. "Having achieved his mission", wrote Will Taylor, the Derbyshire secretary, "Buckston refused to be dissuaded from his decision to retire". He was forty and his performances were affected by his lack of recent experience and the effects of malaria. On his retirement, he was elected the chairman of the committee.

Buckston was a right-handed batsman and played 75 innings in 39 first-class matches at an average of 11.83 and a top score of 96. He was an occasional wicket-keeper and took eight catches and one wicket by stumping.

Buckston lived at Sutton-on-the-Hill and was High Sheriff of Derbyshire in 1926. He died at Sutton-on the Hill aged 61.

Buckston's son, Robin Buckston, played first-class cricket for Derbyshire between 1928 and 1939, and was designated club captain during his final three years within the team. Buckston's brother-in-law, Herbert Allsopp, played first-class cricket for Cambridge University during 1876.

Sporting positions
Preceded by Leonard Oliver	Derbyshire cricket captains 1921	Succeeded by Guy Jackson
Honorary titles
Preceded by Haughton Ealdred Okeover	High Sheriff of Derbyshire; 1926–1927	Succeeded by Henry FitzHerbert Wright
