= Francis Taylor (cricketer) =

English cricketer

Personal information
- Full name: Francis Henry Taylor
- Born: 14 June 1890; Hopton, Derbyshire, England
- Died: 6 December 1963 (aged 73); California, Derby, England
- Batting: Right-handed
- Relatives: William Taylor (brother)

Domestic team information
- Years: Team
- 1908–1911: Derbyshire
- FC debut: 10 August 1908 Derbyshire v Lancashire
- Last FC: 13 July 1911 Derbyshire v Lancashire

Career statistics
Competition	First-class
Matches	8
Runs scored	95
Batting average	6.33
100s/50s	0/0
Top score	18
Catches/stumpings	3/–
- Source: CricketArchive, July 2012

Francis Henry Taylor (14 June 1890 – 6 December 1963) was an English Cricketer who played for Derbyshire County Cricket Club between 1908 and 1911.

Taylor was born at Hopton, Derbyshire and lived in Wirksworth as the son of Walter Taylor of Fern House and his wife Alice. His father was a manufacturer of artificial fertilizer.

Taylor made his debut for Derbyshire in the 1908 season, in a match against Lancashire, when batting in the middle order he made 10 in his first innings. He played again in 1908 and in one match in the 1909 season. He played four matches in the 1910 season, and completed his career with a single match in the 1911 season. After his first game, he almost invariably scored a duck in his first innings and a double figure score in his second innings, his last, 18 against Lancashire in 1911, being his top score. Taylor was a right-hand batsman who played 16 innings in 8 first-class matches. His top score was 18 and his average 6.33.

Taylor died at California, Derby at the age of 73.

Taylor's brother William Taylor also played cricket for Derbyshire although they never played in the same game.
