= Charles Fleming (cricketer) =

English cricketer

Personal information
- Full name: Charles Barnett Fleming
- Born: 28 February 1887; Derby, England
- Died: 22 September 1918 (aged 31); Grévillers, France
- Batting: Right-handed

Domestic team information
- Years: Team
- 1907: Derbyshire
- Only FC: 22 August 1907 Derbyshire v Essex

Career statistics
Competition	First-class
Matches	1
Runs scored	5
Batting average	2.50
100s/50s	0/0
Top score	3
Catches/stumpings	0/–
- Source: CricketArchive, July 2012

Charles Barnett Fleming (28 February 1887 – 22 September 1918) was an English cricketer who played first-class cricket for Derbyshire in 1907. He died in France at the end of the First World War.

Fleming was born in Derby. He represented Derbyshire at the end of the 1907 season in a single County Championship game, a defeat against Essex. He was a right-handed batsman and made little impression, although given high order batting positions.

Fleming served in World War I and died in Grévillers, France at the age of 31.
