= George Marples =

English cricketer

Personal information
- Full name: George Holmes Marples
- Born: 30 May 1883; Attercliffe, Yorkshire, England
- Died: 30 December 1947 (aged 64); Chesterfield, Derbyshire, England
- Bowling: Left-arm medium-fast

Domestic team information
- Years: Team
- 1905: Derbyshire
- FC debut: 10 July 1904 Derbyshire v Australians
- Last FC: 17 July 1905 Derbyshire v MCC

Career statistics
Competition	First-class
Matches	2
Runs scored	11
Batting average	2.75
100s/50s	0/0
Top score	6
Balls bowled	192
Wickets	1
Bowling average	116.00
5 wickets in innings	0
10 wickets in match	0
Best bowling	1/53
Catches/stumpings	1/–
- Source: CricketArchive (subscription required), July 2012

George Holmes Marples (30 May 1883 – 30 December 1947) was an English cricketer who played first-class cricket for Derbyshire in 1905.

Marples was born in Attercliffe, Sheffield. He made two first-class appearances for Derbyshire in the 1905 season, his debut against the touring Australians when he took a wicket. In his second match, a week later against Marylebone Cricket Club, MCC won by an innings and 252 runs. Marples was a left-arm medium-fast bowler who took one wicket in his career at an average of 116.00 and a tailend batsman who scored 11 runs in 4 innings in 2 first-class matches.

Marples died in Chesterfield at the age of 64.
