= Robert Carlin (cricketer) =

English cricketer

Personal information
- Full name: Robert McKenzie Carlin
- Born: 24 January 1871; Eastwood, Nottinghamshire, England
- Died: 10 March 1950 (aged 79); Conisbrough Yorkshire, England
- Batting: Right-handed
- Bowling: Right-arm medium

Domestic team information
- Years: Team
- 1905–1908: Derbyshire
- FC debut: 17 July 1905 Derbyshire v MCC
- Last FC: 6 July 1908 Derbyshire v Nottinghamshire

Career statistics
Competition	First-class
Matches	15
Runs scored	306
Batting average	11.33
100s/50s	0/0
Top score	37
Balls bowled	277
Wickets	5
Bowling average	41.60
5 wickets in innings	0
10 wickets in match	0
Best bowling	2/53
Catches/stumpings	5/–
- Source: CricketArchive, October 2011

Robert McKenzie Carlin (24 January 1871 – 10 March 1950) was an English cricketer who played first-class cricket for Derbyshire between 1905 and 1908. He also played football for Sheffield United. Carlin died at Conisbrough, Yorkshire at the age of 79.

== Cricket career ==
Carlin was born at Eastwood, Nottinghamshire. He made his debut for Derbyshire in the 1905 season in July against Marylebone Cricket Club (MCC) when he took two wickets, but did not play for the club again until the 1907 season. He played ten matches in that year, and four in the 1908 season.

Carlin was a right-hand batsman and played 28 innings in 15 first-class matches with an average of 11.33 and a top score of 37. He was a right-arm medium pace bowler and took five first-class wickets at an average of 41.60 and with a best performance of 2 for 53.

== Football career ==
Robert Carlin
Personal information
- Position: Goalkeeper

Youth career
- Heanor Town

Senior career*
Years	Team	Apps	(Gls)
- Dronfield Town
- Sheffield United
- South Kirkby
- Mexborough Athletic
- * Club domestic league appearances and goals

Alongside cricket, Carlin played football as a goalkeeper, starting as a junior with Heanor Town before playing for Dronfield and professionally with Sheffield United, later playing for both South Kirkby and Mexborough Athletic.
