= Henry Purdy (cricketer) =

English cricketer

Personal information
- Full name: Henry Fox Purdy
- Born: 17 January 1883; Brimington, Derbyshire, England
- Died: 17 February 1943 (aged 60); Chesterfield, England
- Batting: Right-handed
- Bowling: Right-arm medium-fast
- Relatives: John Purdy (uncle)

Domestic team information
- Years: Team
- 1906–1919: Derbyshire
- FC debut: 12 July 1906 Derbyshire v Nottinghamshire
- Last FC: 2 July 1919 Derbyshire v Yorkshire

Career statistics
Competition	First-class
Matches	16
Runs scored	179
Batting average	6.53
100s/50s	0/0
Top score	21
Balls bowled	1,429
Wickets	26
Bowling average	25.42
5 wickets in innings	1
10 wickets in match	0
Best bowling	6/84
Catches/stumpings	5/–
- Source: CricketArchive, July 2012

Henry Fox Purdy (17 January 1883 – 17 February 1943) was an English cricketer who played first-class cricket for Derbyshire between 1906 and 1919.

Purdy was born at Brimington, Derbyshire, although his birth was registered as Henry Fox. He made his debut for Derbyshire in the 1906 season, in July in a match against Nottinghamshire in which his uncle John Purdy played his last match, and in which he took a wicket in each innings. He continued playing to the end of the season and against Northamptonshire achieved his best bowling performance of 6 wickets for 84 runs. He played one game in the 1907 season, and four in the 1908 season. He did not play for the county again until after the First World War in the 1919 season, when he took part in two games against Yorkshire. Purdy was a right-arm fast-medium bowler and took 25 first-class wickets at an average of 25.42 and a best performance of 6–84. He was a right-hand batsman and played 30 innings in 16 first-class matches with a top score of 21 and an average of 6.53.

Purdy died at Newbold, Chesterfield, Derbyshire at the age of 60. His uncle John Purdy also played for Derbyshire.
