= Robert Bagguley =

English cricketer

Personal information
- Full name: Robert Bagguley
- Born: 10 July 1873; Ruddington, Nottinghamshire
- Died: 8 October 1946; Bradmore, Nottinghamshire
- Height: 5 ft 3 in (1.60 m)
- Batting: Right-handed
- Bowling: Left-arm medium

Robert Bagguley (10 July 1873 – 8 October 1946) was an English first-class cricketer active 1891–1900 who played for Nottinghamshire. He was born in Ruddington; died in Bradmore. Bagguley was only 17 when he made his first-class debut for Nottinghamshire in 1891 and took six for 74 bowling against Sussex at Hove.
