= Arthur Hogg (cricketer) =

English cricketer

Personal information
- Born: 20 June 1877; Pentrich, Derbyshire, England
- Died: 21 April 1956 (aged 78); Ripley, Derbyshire, England
- Batting: Right-handed

Domestic team information
- Years: Team
- 1905–1906: Derbyshire
- FC debut: 17 August 1905 Derbyshire v Lancashire
- Last FC: 16 July 1906 Derbyshire v Yorkshire

Career statistics
Competition	First-class
Matches	3
Runs scored	5
Batting average	0.83
100s/50s	0/0
Top score	4
Catches/stumpings	0/–
- Source: CricketArchive (subscription required), July 2012

Arthur Hogg (20 June 1877 – 21 April 1956) was an English cricketer who played first-class cricket for Derbyshire in 1905 and 1906.

Hogg was born in Pentrich, the son of John Hogg, a coal miner and his wife Ann. He made his first appearance for Derbyshire during the 1905 season in a match against Lancashire when he scored a single run in his first innings of a drawn match. His next game was in the 1906 season against Surrey in July, when he scored a career-best of 4 in the second innings. His final game was later that season against Yorkshire when he did not score in either innings. Derbyshire lost both those matches. Hogg was a right-handed batsman and played 6 innings in 3 first-class matches with a total run count of 5.

Hogg died in Ripley at the age of 79.
