= Joseph Cupitt =

English cricketer

Personal information
- Full name: Joseph Cupitt
- Born: 25 September 1867; Barrow Hill, Derbyshire, England
- Died: 6 May 1932 (aged 64); South Kirkby, Yorkshire, England
- Bowling: Left arm medium pace bowler

Domestic team information
- Years: Team
- 1905: Derbyshire
- First-class debut: 22 May 1905 Derbyshire v Essex
- Last First-class: 19 June 1905 Derbyshire v Northamptonshire

Career statistics
Competition	First-class
Matches	2
Runs scored	19
Batting average	9.5
100s/50s	/
Top score	13
Balls bowled	450
Wickets	3
Bowling average	48.33
5 wickets in innings
10 wickets in match
Best bowling	1-14
Catches/stumpings	0/-
- Source: , July 2012

Joseph Cupitt (25 September 1867 – 6 May 1932) was an English cricketer who played first-class cricket for Derbyshire in 1905.

Cupitt was born in Barrow Hill, Derbyshire, the son of Thomas Cupitt, a coal miner, and his wife Susannah. Cupitt himself became a miner. He played for Derbyshire in the 1892 season and in the 1893 season when the club was outside the championship. Twelve years later in the 1905 season he made his first-class debut, against Essex in May. He took one wicket in the match, that of future Test cricketer Claude Buckenham, though Derbyshire lost the match by an innings margin, in part thanks to a first-class best 277 runs from Charlie McGahey. His second and final first-class appearance came the following month, against Northamptonshire, against whom, he took two wickets but scored just a single run in two innings.

Cupitt was a left-arm medium-pace bowler and took three first-class wickets at an average of 48.33 and a best performance of 2 for 24. He batted in four innings in two first-class matches at an average of 9.5 and a top score of 13.

Cupitt died in South Kirkby, Yorkshire at the age of 64.
