= Norman Todd =

English cricketer

Personal information
- Full name: Norman Douglas Todd
- Born: 11 June 1884; Hetton-le-Hole, County Durham, England
- Died: 12 May 1959 (aged 74); Ruddington, Nottinghamshire, England
- Batting: Right-handed

Domestic team information
- Years: Team
- 1906–1908: Derbyshire
- FC debut: 28 June 1906 Derbyshire v Northamptonshire
- Last FC: 17 August 1908 Derbyshire v Gentlemen of Philadelphia

Career statistics
Competition	First-class
Matches	2
Runs scored	6
Batting average	1.50
100s/50s	0/0
Top score	6
Catches/stumpings	0/–
- Source: CricketArchive, July 2012

Norman Douglas Todd (11 June 1884 – 12 May 1959) was an English cricketer who played first-class cricket for Derbyshire in 1906 and 1908

Todd was born at Hetton-le-Hole, County Durham. He made his debut for Derbyshire in the 1906 season, in a match in June against Northamptonshire, when he made no runs in either innings. His next game for Derbyshire was in the 1908 season, in August against the touring Gentlemen of Philadelphia. In this he scored 6 in his second innings. Todd was a right-hand batsman and played 4 innings in 2 first-class matches with a total of 6, all in one innings.

Todd died at Brook Hill, Ruddington, Nottinghamshire at the age of 74.
