= Guy Sparrow (cricketer) =

English cricketer (1877–1958)

Personal information
- Full name: Guy Ratcliff Sparrow
- Born: 2 July 1877; Aston, Warwickshire, England
- Died: 4 January 1958 (aged 80); Burton-on-Trent, England
- Batting: Right-handed

Domestic team information
- Years: Team
- 1905: Derbyshire
- FC debut: 19 June 1905 Derbyshire v Northamptonshire
- Last FC: 22 June 1905 Derbyshire v Surrey

Career statistics
| Competition | First-class |
|---|---|
| Matches | 2 |
| Runs scored | 75 |
| Batting average | 18.75 |
| 100s/50s | 0/1 |
| Top score | 64 |
| Catches/stumpings | 0/– |
- Source: CricketArchive, July 2012

Guy Ratcliff Sparrow (2 July 1877 – 4 January 1958) was an English cricketer who played for Derbyshire during the 1905 season.

== Biography ==
Sparrow was born on 2 July 1877, in Aston, to Walter Sparrow and Emma Gertrude Ratcliff. His father was assistant surgeon to the 9th Warwickshire Rifle Volunteer Corps. Sparrow took part in the Second Boer War as a private in the 8th Coy, 4th Bn. Imperial Yeomanry.

Sparrow made two County Championship appearances for Derbyshire during the 1905 season. In his debut match in June against Northamptonshire he scored 67 in the first innings, and was off the mark with a few runs in his three remaining innings. Sparrow was a right-handed batsman and played 4 innings in 2 first-class matches with an average of 18.75 and a top score of 64.

Sparrow died on 4 January 1958, aged 80, in Burton-on-Trent.
