= Frederick Peach =

English cricketer (1882–1965)

Personal information
- Full name: Frederick George Peach
- Born: 2 November 1882; Repton, Derbyshire, England
- Died: 15 January 1965 (aged 82); Stapenhill, Staffordshire, England
- Batting: Right-handed
- Bowling: Leg-break

Domestic team information
- Years: Team
- 1907–1925: Derbyshire
- FC debut: 10 June 1907 Derbyshire v Sussex
- Last FC: 4 July 1925 Derbyshire v Leicestershire

Career statistics
Competition	First-class
Matches	12
Runs scored	258
Batting average	11.21
100s/50s	0/1
Top score	61*
Balls bowled	228
Wickets	4
Bowling average	42.50
5 wickets in innings	0
10 wickets in match	0
Best bowling	3/50
Catches/stumpings	3/–
- Source: CricketArchive, February 2012

Frederick George Peach (2 November 1882 – 15 January 1965) was an English cricketer who played first-class cricket for Derbyshire between 1907 and 1925.

Peach was born at Repton, Derbyshire. He played one match for Derbyshire in the County Championship in the 1907 season against Sussex when he was out for a duck in his first innings and made 8 in his second. He did not play again until the 1920 season when he played several matches for the club in what turned out to be its worst season. During 1920 he achieved his best bowling performance with three wickets against Sussex and his top score of 61 not out against Warwickshire and stood in as captain against Leicestershire. He played two games in the 1924 season and one in the 1925 season.

Peach was a right-hand batsman and played 24 innings in 12 first-class matches, with an average of 11.21 and a top score of 61 not out. He was a leg-break bowler and took 4 first-class wickets at an average of 42.5 and a best performance of 3 for 50. He was also an occasional wicket-keeper, but not in the first-class game.

Peach was an alderman and Mayor of Burton-upon-Trent.

Peach died at Stapenhill, Staffordshire at the age of 82.
