= Oswald Burton =

English cricketer

Personal information
- Born: 24 June 1874; Gorton, Manchester, England
- Died: 4 July 1944 (aged 70); Kingsdown, Bristol, England
- Batting: Right-handed
- Bowling: Right-arm medium-fast

Domestic team information
- Years: Team
- 1901–1905: Derbyshire
- FC debut: 23 May 1901 Derbyshire v MCC
- Last FC: 21 August 1905 Derbyshire v Nottinghamshire

Career statistics
Competition	First-class
Matches	3
Runs scored	21
Batting average	–
100s/50s	0/0
Top score	9*
Balls bowled	232
Wickets	5
Bowling average	31.20
5 wickets in innings	0
10 wickets in match	0
Best bowling	2/44
Catches/stumpings	2/–
- Source: CricketArchive, October 2011

Oswald Burton (21 August 1874 – 4 July 1944) was an English cricketer who played first-class cricket for Derbyshire in 1901 and 1905.

Burton was born at Gorton, Manchester. He made his debut for Derbyshire in a match against Marylebone Cricket Club (MCC) in the 1901 season. He was not out for 9 in both innings and took 2 wickets. He next appeared in the 1905 season against Lancashire when he again took 2 wickets but did not bat in either innings. Against Nottinghamshire he was not out in both innings and took one wicket.

Burton was a right-arm medium-fast bowler and in three first-class matches took five wickets at an average of 31.20 with a best performance of 2 for 44. He was a right-hand batsman and played four innings in three first-class matches without being out in any of them and with a top score of 9 not out.

Burton died at Kingsdown, Bristol at the age of 69.
