= George Maltby =

English cricketer (1876–1924)

Personal information
- Born: 1 October 1876; South Normanton. Derbyshire, England
- Died: 30 July 1924 (aged 47); Huthwaite, Nottinghamshire, England
- Batting: Right-handed

Domestic team information
- Years: Team
- 1905: Derbyshire
- FC debut: 24 July 1905 Derbyshire v Warwickshire
- Last FC: 10 August 1905 Derbyshire v Sussex

Career statistics
Competition	First-class
Matches	3
Runs scored	22
Batting average	4.40
100s/50s	0/0
Top score	7*
Balls bowled	30
Wickets	0
Bowling average	–
5 wickets in innings	–
10 wickets in match	–
Best bowling	–
Catches/stumpings	1/–
- Source: CricketArchive, July 2012

George Maltby (1 October 1876 – 30 July 1924) was an English cricketer who played first-class cricket for Derbyshire in 1905.

Maltby was born in South Normanton, Derbyshire, the son of Samuel Maltby, a coal miner, and his wife Jane.

Maltby made his first-class debut for Derbyshire in the 1905 season against Warwickshire in July, hitting a duck in his debut innings and scoring 4 in the second. In the same week, Maltby appeared against Leicestershire with a similar performance. In his third and final first-class appearance in an innings defeat by Sussex at Hove, Maltby was not out at the close of play. Maltby was a right-handed batsman and played 6 innings in 3 matches with a top score of 7 not out and an average of 4.40. He bowled 5 overs but took no wickets.

Maltby died in Huthwaite, Nottinghamshire at the age of 48.
