= Herbert Cooper =

English cricketer (1883–1963)

Personal information
- Born: 25 December 1883; Dukinfield, Cheshire, England
- Died: 6 December 1963 (aged 79); Oldham Lancashire, England
- Batting: Right-handed

Domestic team information
- Years: Team
- 1905–1910: Derbyshire
- FC debut: 3 July 1905 Derbyshire v Leicestershire
- Last FC: 12 May 1910 Derbyshire v Lancashire

Career statistics
Competition	First-class
Matches	15
Runs scored	216
Batting average	9.00
100s/50s	0/0
Top score	23
Catches/stumpings	7/–
- Source: CricketArchive, October 2011

Herbert Cooper (25 December 1883 – 6 December 1963) was an English cricketer who played first-class cricket for Derbyshire from 1905 to 1910

Cooper was born at Dukinfield, Cheshire, He made his debut for Derbyshire in a single match in the 1905 season against Leicestershire when he failed to score in either innings. He played twice in the 1906 season and then turned out nine times in the 1907 season. After a break in 1908 he played two games in the 1909 season and a single game in the 1910 season.

Cooper was a right-hand batsman and played 28 innings in 15 first-class matches with a top score of 23 and an average of 9.00.

Cooper died at Moorhey, Oldham, Lancashire at the age of 79.
