= William Peach =

English cricketer (1875–1959)

Personal information
- Born: 6 May 1875; Timberland Fen, Lincolnshire, England
- Died: 29 January 1959 (aged 83); Chesterfield, Derbyshire, England
- Batting: Right-handed
- Bowling: Right-arm medium

Domestic team information
- Years: Team
- 1905: Derbyshire
- Only FC: 3 July 1905 Derbyshire v Leicestershire

Career statistics
Competition	First-class
Matches	1
Runs scored	10
Batting average	5.00
100s/50s	0/0
Top score	10
Balls bowled	64
Wickets	4
Bowling average	11.50
5 wickets in innings	0
10 wickets in match	0
Best bowling	4/46
Catches/stumpings	1/–
- Source: CricketArchive, July 2012

William Peach (6 May 1875 – 29 January 1959) was an English cricketer who played for Derbyshire in 1905.

Peach was born in Timberland Fen, Lincolnshire, the son of Joseph Peach, a labourer, and his wife Olive.

Peach played club cricket for Chesterfield Cricket Club, and made his first and only first-class appearance for Derbyshire in the 1905 season against Leicestershire in July. He took 4 wickets for 46, including the wickets of John King and Albert Knight and made 10 runs in his second innings in a match when Derbyshire players averaged 3 in the first innings and 8 in the second. Peach was a right-arm medium-fast bowler and took 4 wickets at an average of 11.50 in his first-class career and scored 10 runs in total.

Peach played two minor counties championship matches for Lincolnshire the first in 1908 and the second in 1914. He died in Stonegravels, Chesterfield, Derbyshire at the age of 83.
