= Irvine Dearnaley =

English cricketer (1877–1965)

Irvine Dearnaley (18 February 1877 – 14 March 1965) was an English cricketer who played first-class cricket for Derbyshire in 1905 and 1907.

Dearnaley was born in Glossop, Derbyshire, the son of Joseph Dearnaley, a clerk in the paper trade, and his wife Sarah. He made his debut for Derbyshire in a non-status match against the West Indies in the 1900 season. He did not play for the county again until the 1905 season, when he played two games against Essex and Leicestershire. His next first-class appearance was against the South African touring side in the 1907 season, which was followed by a match against Yorkshire which ended in an innings defeat.

Dearnaley was a right-handed batsman who played eight innings in four first-class matches with an average of 6.37 and a top score of 34.

Dearnaley played football for Derby County F.C. in 1908. His record still stood in 2011 for the highest number of runs scored in a match for Glossop Cricket Club, which he achieved in 1913. Dearnaley died in Ashton-under-Lyne aged 88.

== See also ==
- List of English cricket and football players
