= Frederic Hunter =

English cricketer (1886–1926)

Personal information
- Full name: Frederic Cecil Hunter
- Born: 23 August 1886; Glossop, Derbyshire, England
- Died: 21 July 1926 (aged 39); Adelaide, South Australia
- Batting: Right-handed
- Bowling: Leg-break

Domestic team information
- Years: Team
- 1905–1907: Derbyshire
- FC debut: 16 June 1905 Derbyshire v Essex
- Last FC: 27 May 1907 Derbyshire v Kent

Career statistics
Competition	First-class
Matches	28
Runs scored	564
Batting average	12.26
100s/50s	0/2
Top score	51
Balls bowled	1,058
Wickets	17
Bowling average	40.23
5 wickets in innings	0
10 wickets in match	0
Best bowling	2/18
Catches/stumpings	9/–
- Source: CricketArchive, December 2011

Frederic Cecil Hunter (23 August 1886 – 21 July 1926), was an English cricketer who played first-class cricket for Derbyshire from 1905 to 1907

Hunter was born at Glossop, Derbyshire. He made his debut for Derbyshire in the 1905 season against Essex in June when he made 27 in his first innings and took a wicket. He made his top score of 51 against Sussex in the 1906 season and played his last match in the 1907 season.

Hunter was a right-hand batsman and played 49 innings in 28 first-class matches with an average of 12.26 and a top score of 51. He was a leg-break bowler and took 17 first-class wickets for an average of 40.23 and a best performance of 2 for 18.

Between 1910 and 1912 Hunter played minor county cricket for Cheshire

Hunter died at Adelaide, South Australia at the age of 39.
