= John McDonald (English cricketer) =

English cricketer

Personal information
- Full name: John Archibald McDonald
- Born: 29 May 1882; Belper, Derbyshire, England
- Died: 4 June 1961 (aged 79); Brownhill, Lancashire, England
- Batting: Right-handed

Domestic team information
- Years: Team
- 1905–1906: Derbyshire
- FC debut: 21 August 1905 Derbyshire v Nottinghamshire
- Last FC: 24 May 1906 Derbyshire v Leicestershire

Career statistics
| Competition | First-class |
|---|---|
| Matches | 3 |
| Runs scored | 57 |
| Batting average | 9.50 |
| 100s/50s | 0/0 |
| Top score | 21 |
| Catches/stumpings | 0/– |
- Source: CricketArchive, July 2012

John Archibald McDonald (29 May 1882 – 4 June 1961) was an English cricketer who played first-class cricket for Derbyshire in 1905 and 1906.

McDonald was born in Belper, Derbyshire. He made his debut for Derbyshire during the 1905 season, playing against Nottinghamshire. McDonald scored a career-high score of 21 runs in his debut first-class innings, but the team slipped to a defeat. McDonald played two further first-class matches for Derbyshire during the 1906 season. He was a right-handed batsman and played 6 innings in 3 first-class matches with a top score of 21 and an average of 9.50

McDonald died in Brownhill, Lancashire in 1961, at the age of 79.
