= Frederick Bracey =

English cricketer (1887–1960)

Personal information
- Full name: Frederick Cecil Bracey
- Born: 20 July 1887; Glossop, Derbyshire, England
- Died: 28 March 1960 (aged 72); Derby, England
- Batting: Left-handed
- Bowling: Slow left-arm orthodox

Domestic team information
- Years: Team
- 1906–1914: Derbyshire
- FC debut: 28 June 1906 Derbyshire v Northamptonshire
- Last FC: 6 August 1914 Derbyshire v Leicestershire

Career statistics
Competition	First-class
Matches	77
Runs scored	562
Batting average	7.20
100s/50s	0/0
Top score	28
Balls bowled	6,417
Wickets	132
Bowling average	23.65
5 wickets in innings	5
10 wickets in match	1
Best bowling	6/36
Catches/stumpings	21/–
- Source: CricketArchive, July 2012

Frederick Cecil Bracey (20 July 1887 – 28 March 1960) was an English cricketer who played first-class cricket for Derbyshire from 1906 to 1914

Bracey was born at Glossop, Derbyshire. He made his debut for Derbyshire in the 1906 season, in June against Northamptonshire when he only had the chance to bowl seven balls, and was last man in, scoring 1 in his second innings. However he took three wickets in his next match against Warwickshire and continued to play regularly for Derbyshire until 1909 averaging 2 wickets per match. In the 1907 season, he took 5 for 102 against the South Africans, and then in one match against Northamptonshire took 5 for 9 in the first innings and 6 for 36 in the second. In the 1908 season, he took 5 for 66 against Lancashire. He only played half the 1910 season, and did not play at all in 1911. He reappeared for Derbyshire in the 1912 season, maintaining his form and in the 1913 season, he took 6 for 62 against Northamptonshire. In the 1914 season, his performance was considerably down, and the First World War brought a halt to his first-class cricket career.

Bracey was a slow left-arm orthodox bowler who took 132 first-class wickets at an average of 23.65 and a best performance of 6-36. He had five 5 wicket innings and one 10 wicket match. He was a left-hand batsman and played 132 innings in 77 first-class matches with an average of 7.20 and a top score of 28.

Bracey was also a footballer for Leicester Fosse, Bradford Park Avenue and Rochdale

Bracey died at Derby at the age of 72.
