= Thomas Hallam (cricketer) =

English cricketer (1881–1958)

Personal information
- Full name: Thomas Haydn Hallam
- Born: 12 April 1881; Pilsley, Derbyshire, England
- Died: 24 November 1958 (aged 77); Christchurch, New Zealand
- Batting: Right-handed

Domestic team information
- Years: Team
- 1906–1907: Derbyshire
- First-class debut: 6 August 1906 Derbyshire v Hampshire
- Last First-class: 11 July 1907 Derbyshire v Nottinghamshire

Career statistics
Competition	First-class
Matches	10
Runs scored	224
Batting average	11.78
100s/50s	0/1
Top score	68
Balls bowled
Wickets
Bowling average
5 wickets in innings
10 wickets in match
Best bowling
Catches/stumpings	5/-
- Source: , November 2011

Thomas Haydn Hallam (12 April 1881 – 24 November 1958) was an English cricketer who played first-class cricket for Derbyshire in 1906 and 1907.

Hallam was born at Pilsley, Derbyshire. A right-hand batsman, he made his debut for Derbyshire in the 1906 season in August against Hampshire but made little impact. However, in his second match, against Warwickshire, he scored 68 in the first innings and 45 in the second. His scores in his remaining four games in the season were more modest. He played four games in the 1907 season, and only in the first did he score in double figures.

Hallam emigrated to New Zealand in 1920. In 1921 he played two games for Wairarapa in the Hawke Cup. From 1923 to 1948 he was the groundsman at Lancaster Park, the Test ground in Christchurch, where he gained a reputation for the high quality of his pitches. For the next 10 years he served at the ground as pavilion gatekeeper. He died in Christchurch at the age of 77.
