= George Walkden =

English cricketer

Personal information
- Full name: George Godfrey Walkden
- Born: 10 March 1883; Derby, England
- Died: 16 May 1923 (aged 40); Risley, Derbyshire, England

Domestic team information
- Years: Team
- 1905–1906: Derbyshire
- First-class debut: 6 July 1905 Derbyshire v Nottinghamshire
- Last First-class: 11 June 1906 Derbyshire v Leicestershire

Career statistics
Competition	First-class
Matches	7
Runs scored	114
Batting average	8.76
100s/50s	/
Top score	33
Balls bowled
Wickets
Bowling average
5 wickets in innings
10 wickets in match
Best bowling
Catches/stumpings	2/-
- Source: , July 2012

George Godfrey Walkden (10 March 1883 – 16 May 1923) was an English cricketer who played first-class cricket for Derbyshire in 1905 and 1906.

Walkden was born at Derby. He made his debut for Derbyshire in the 1905 season in July against Nottinghamshire, when he made 27 runs in his first innings. He played five more matches for Derbyshire during the 1905 season making his top score of 33 against Marylebone Cricket Club (MCC). His regular double figure run totals tailed off after his first three matches and he played just one match for the county in the 1906 season.

Walkden played 13 innings in seven first-class matches with an average of 8.76 and a top score of 33.

In 1908 Walkden joined the 1st Derbyshire Howitzer Battery of the Territorial Force as a Second lieutenant. In May 1923, Walkden had a motor cycle accident near Risley, Derbyshire and died at Derby Infirmary at the age of 40.
