= Frederick Webster =

English cricketer

Frederick Webster (19 January 1885 – 23 March 1938) was an English cricketer who played for Derbyshire in 1906.

Webster was born in Eccleshall. He made one appearance for Derbyshire, during the 1906 season, against Lancashire. Batting from the tailend, Webster scored 1 in the first innings and 10 in the second – and took one wicket with the ball – in a game which Derbyshire lost by an innings margin.
