= Reginald Rickman =

English cricketer and British Army officer

Personal information
- Full name: Reginald Binns Rickman
- Born: 6 May 1881; Doncaster, Yorkshire
- Died: 22 November 1940 (aged 59); Chelsea, London
- Batting: Right-handed
- Bowling: Right-arm medium

Domestic team information
- Years: Team
- 1906–1911: Derbyshire
- FC debut: 21 May 1906 Derbyshire v Lancashire
- Last FC: 24 July 1911 Derbyshire v Surrey

Career statistics
Competition	First-class
Matches	65
Runs scored	1,262
Batting average	11.47
100s/50s	0/2
Top score	68
Balls bowled	3,521
Wickets	62
Bowling average	31.72
5 wickets in innings	1
10 wickets in match	0
Best bowling	5/80
Catches/stumpings	7/–
- Source: CricketArchive, 10 February 2010

Reginald Binns Rickman (6 May 1881 – 22 November 1940) was a British Army officer and cricketer who played first-class cricket for Derbyshire between 1906 and 1911 and captained the side in 1908 and 1909.

== Family ==
Rickman was born at Doncaster, Yorkshire, the son of Samuel Rickman and his wife Emily Rachel Binns, daughter of Charles Binns manager of the Clay Cross Company. The family lived in Devon, and Rickman's first games were Minor Counties matches for Devon in 1901 and 1903.

== Cricket ==
In the 1906 season, Rickman made his debut for Derbyshire in an uninspiring performance against Lancashire in May. He continued to play in 1907 and in 1908 was captain in a season which saw Derbyshire move up to third from the bottom in the County Championship. He captained again in the 1909 season but the team slipped a notch in the table. He played seven games in the 1910 season but appeared in his last single game in the 1911 season. Rickman was a right hand batsman and played 65 matches for the club and 118 innings. His highest score was 68 and he averaged 11.47. He was a right arm medium bowler and took 62 wickets at an average of 31.72.

== Military career ==
Rickman was commissioned as a second lieutenant in the 3rd (Militia) Battalion, the Sherwood Foresters (Derbyshire Regiment) on 4 September 1900, and was promoted to a lieutenant on 19 March 1902. He served in the Second Boer War in South Africa, where he took part in operations in Orange River Colony. After the end of the war in June 1902, he returned home on the SS Harlech Castle in September that year. In May 1904 he transferred to the 3rd (Militia) Battalion, the Cheshire Regiment. He later served in the First World War, and became a lieutenant colonel.

He died at Chelsea, London at the age of 61.

Sporting positions
Preceded by Levi Wright	Derbyshire cricket captains 1908-1909	Succeeded by John Chapman
