= Charles Ollivierre =

West Indian cricketer

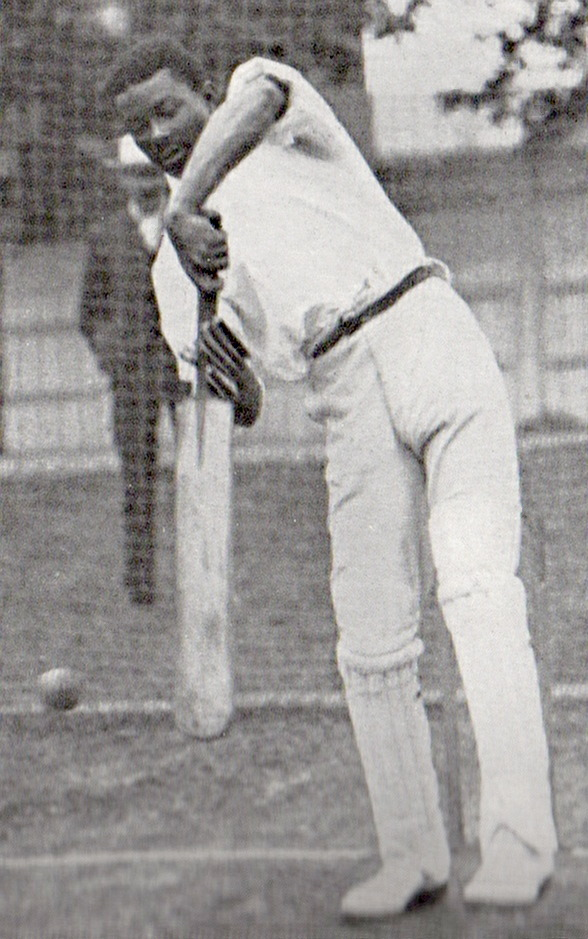

Personal information
- Full name: Charles Augustus Ollivierre
- Born: 20 July 1876; Kingstown, St Vincent
- Died: 25 March 1949 (aged 72); Pontefract, Yorkshire, England
- Batting: Right-handed
- Role: Batsman
- Relatives: Richard Ollivierre (brother); Helon Ollivierre (brother)

Domestic team information
- Years: Team
- 1894/95: Trinidad
- 1901–1907: Derbyshire

Career statistics
Competition	First-class
Matches	114
Runs scored	4,830
Batting average	23.56
100s/50s	3/25
Top score	229
Balls bowled	1,085
Wickets	29
Bowling average	22.89
5 wickets in innings	3
10 wickets in match	1
Best bowling	6/51
Catches/stumpings	110/–
- Source: CricketArchive, 23 July 2010

Charles Augustus Ollivierre (20 July 1876 – 25 March 1949) was a Vincentian cricketer who represented the West Indies in matches before they attained Test match status. Born in St Vincent, Ollivierre initially played first-class cricket for Trinidad; he was selected to tour England with the West Indies team in 1900. He later qualified to play first-class cricket for Derbyshire between 1901 and 1907, becoming the first black West Indian to play for an English county. Ollivierre was reasonably successful in county cricket and had a reputation as a stylish batsman. However, he dropped out of first-class cricket after 1907 owing to eye trouble.

== Early life and career ==
Ollivierre was born in St Vincent on 20 July 1876. (Note: CricketArchive gives Ollivierre's birthplace as Port Elizabeth, Bequia. Cricinfo states that he was born in Kingstown, St Vincent. His obituary in the Daily Gleaner says he was born in St Vincent, and his Wisden obituary names Kingston, Jamaica.) His family were enthusiastic cricketers, although the region had little history within the sport, and his two younger brothers Richard and Helon went on to represent the West Indies in first-class cricket.

Initially, Ollivierre played for Trinidad; he made his first-class debut against an English touring team in March 1895 at the age of 18. He took two wickets, scored 7 runs in his first innings and 12 runs in the second. In non-first-class cricket, he continued to represent St Vincent, and impressed critics when Barbados played the island in 1897. In 1899, he played two first-class matches for a team selected by A. B. St Hill against a team representing Trinidad. In the first game, he took 11 wickets and scored 67 in the second innings; in the second game, he took a further five wickets in Trinidad's first innings.

== West Indian tour of England in 1900 ==
During the 1900 English cricket season, Ollivierre travelled to England with a West Indian team. Invited to tour England by Lord Hawke following the success of English tours to the Caribbean, the team was the first from the West Indies to visit England, and matches were not first-class. The team improved steadily throughout, and by the end of the tour were judged to be playing well. Although predominantly made up from white players, the team contained several black cricketers; at the time, the dominant teams in the West Indies were exclusively white. Ollivierre was the most consistent and successful batsman in the team, scoring 883 runs at a batting average of 32. His highest score, and only century, came against Leicestershire, when he scored 159 runs and shared an opening partnership of 238 with Pelham Warner. He also shared an opening partnership of 208 with Percy Cox against Surrey. He bowled occasionally in the early part of the tour, although with little success, but did not bowl at all in his last eight games.

According to the review of the tour in Wisden Cricketers' Almanack, Ollivierre was the team's best batsman, and his innings against Leicestershire was one of the best of the season. The article observed: "He has strokes all round the wicket, and in some ways reminds one of Ranji". During the tour, Ollivierre agreed to play for Derbyshire and remained in England to begin the two-year process of qualification for the County Championship. It is unlikely that Ollivierre ever returned to the West Indies.

== Derbyshire cricketer ==
Throughout his career in England, Ollivierre played as an amateur cricketer. (Note: At the time, cricketers were shown to be amateurs by the inclusion of "Mr" before their names; professionals' names were given without a title. As Ollivierre is described as "Mr" in his obituary, he was an amateur throughout his career.) He was employed by Samuel Hill-Wood, a businessman and politician from Derbyshire, to work in his office in Glossop, where Ollivierre lived. During the 1901 season, he played three first-class games for Derbyshire in non-Championship games: twice against London County Cricket Club and once against the touring South African cricket team, hitting two half-centuries in the process of scoring 247 runs at an average of 41.16. After further appearances in 1902, while waiting to qualify, against London County and the Australian touring team, he became eligible for county matches in July and made his Championship debut against Essex. Later in 1902, he scored 167 against Warwickshire, his maiden first-class century. In all first-class matches in the season, Ollivierre scored 524 runs at 34.93. The following season, Ollivierre played in 19 games and scored 721 runs, but his average fell to 20.60.

Ollivierre's most successful season was 1904, when he scored 1,268 runs at an average of 34.27. Against Essex, he made the highest score of his career, when, according to his obituary in Wisden, "he was the dominating figure in a remarkable match". Essex scored 597 runs in their first innings; Derbyshire replied with 548, of which Ollivierre made 229. After Essex were bowled out for 97, Derbyshire hit off the required runs to win by nine wickets. Ollivierre was left on 92 not out, and had scored 321 runs in the match. The match report in the 1905 edition of Wisden noted: "In defeating Essex, Derbyshire accomplished the most phenomenal performance ever recorded in first-class cricket ... [Their] achievement has no parallel in the history of the game." Over the following seasons, Ollivierre's form faded. In 1905, he scored 759 runs at an average of 18.07. He improved his average with 752 runs at 25.06 in 1906, including his final first-class century. During that season, he played against a touring West Indian team which included his brother Richard— Ollivierre scored 0 and 64 not out. In 1907, he managed just 417 runs at 12.26. In these later seasons, he began to have problems with his eyesight, and was forced to retire from first-class cricket after 1907. In total, he played 114 first-class games, scored 4,830 runs at 23.56 and hit three centuries. However, he continued to play club cricket in Yorkshire and, annually between 1924 and 1939, spent time in the Netherlands coaching in schools. Ollivierre died at Pontefract in Yorkshire on 25 March 1949, and is buried in the churchyard of St Stephen at Fylingdales.

== Style and impact ==
According to Wisden in 1901, as a batsman Ollivierre "was particularly strong in cutting and playing to leg". J. N. Pentelow, a cricket writer, suggested in 1928 that "there was something about Ollivierre that reminded one of the great Ranji. He was a more heavily built man than the slim Ranji of the days when we were young; but his strokes and his movements had real grace." A correspondent in the Observer in 1931 remembered Ollivierre as a "great batsman", while Neville Cardus, writing in 1920, named Ollivierre among a list of top-quality batsmen who did not do themselves justice at the highest level: "Geniuses who have just lost their way ...every one of them in possession of an excellent enough record in county cricket, but every one of them really intended by nature to wear the most precious laurels the greatest of games has to offer".

Ollivierre was the first black West Indian cricketer to play county cricket, and the first West Indian cricketer to establish a cricketing reputation outside of that region. Other West Indians looked to follow his example, and several were approached by English counties with a view to qualifying. At least one of Ollivierre's Derbyshire colleagues was unhappy playing alongside a black cricketer; Bill Storer, according to the cricket writer E. H. D. Sewell, believed in "England for the English" and specifically objected to presence of black people. However, there is no evidence that Ollivierre experienced any difficulties from spectators, and the historian Jack Williams suggests that despite racism inherent in English cricket at the time, Ollivierre's presence may have "created goodwill towards non-whites among [Derbyshire's] white supporters".

== Bibliography ==
- Green, Jeffrey (1998). Black Edwardians : Black people in Britain, 1901–1914. London: Frank Cass. ISBN 0-7146-4426-9.
