= Albert Lawton =

English cricketer (1879–1955)

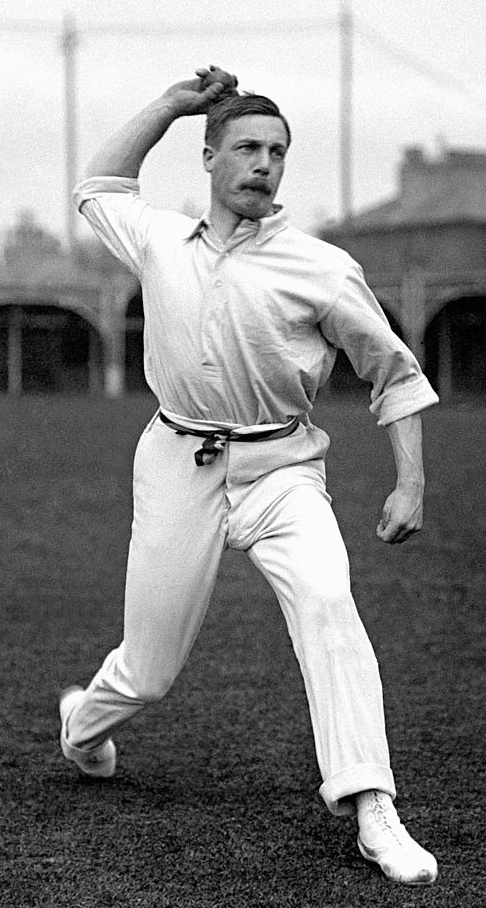
- Lawton pictured in about 1905

Personal information
- Full name: Albert Edward Lawton
- Born: 31 March 1879; Dukinfield, Cheshire, England
- Died: 24 December 1955 (aged 76); Manchester, England
- Batting: Right-handed
- Bowling: Right-arm medium-slow
- Role: All-rounder

Domestic team information
- Years: Team
- 1900–1910: Derbyshire
- 1912–1914: Lancashire
- FC debut: 10 May 1900 Derbyshire v Lancashire
- Last FC: 1 July 1914 MCC v Cambridge Univ.

Career statistics
Competition	First-class
Matches	182
Runs scored	7,509
Batting average	24.78
100s/50s	11/35
Top score	168
Balls bowled	6,239
Wickets	113
Bowling average	31.92
5 wickets in innings	0
10 wickets in match	0
Best bowling	4/19
Catches/stumpings	125/1
- Source: CricketArchive, 6 February 2010

Albert Edward Lawton (31 March 1879 – 25 December 1955) was an English cricketer who played first-class cricket for Derbyshire between 1900 and 1910 and for Lancashire between 1912 and 1914. He captained the Derbyshire team between 1902 and 1905 and also played for London County and Marylebone Cricket Club (MCC).

== Early life ==
Lawton was born at Dukinfield, Cheshire, the son of John Edward Lawton and his wife Ellen. His father owned a cotton spinning business at Dukinfield and in 1883 Frederic Charles Arkwright brought him to Matlock, Derbyshire to revive Masson Mill to meet the growing market for sewing thread generated by the popularity of sewing machines. Lawton senior built a substantial mansion Woodbank, later Cromford Court, overlooking Masson Mill.

== Cricket career ==
Lawton made his debut for Derbyshire in the 1900 season and remained with the team until 1910. He also played matches for London County from 1900 to 1903 and for the Marylebone Cricket Club (MCC) from 1905 to 1914. Lawton captained Derbyshire between 1902 and 1905, although for part of 1904 Maynard Ashcroft held the captaincy. In 1902 he hit three of his ten first-class centuries, all at Derby. He scored 149 in two and a quarter hours against W.G. Grace's London County, 146 against Hampshire and 126 in just over two hours against Warwickshire. He scored 1,044 runs in the 1902 season with an average of 27.47.

The Lawton family left Matlock around 1910 and Lawton then played for Lancashire from 1912 to 1914. His last significant game was a one-off match for MCC in 1920. Lawton was a right hand batsman who played 314 innings in 182 first-class matches. His highest score was 168 and his average 24.78. He was a right arm slow-medium bowler who took 113 wickets with an average of 31.92. While he was captain, Derbyshire ended the season twice at 10th in the table and otherwise 12th and 14th. Wisden described Lawton as "very tall" and a "prodigious hitter".

Lawton died at Manchester aged 76.

Sporting positions
Preceded by Samuel Hill Wood	Derbyshire cricket captains 1902–1906	Succeeded by Levi Wright
Preceded by Levi Wright	Derbyshire cricket captains 1908–1909	Succeeded by John Chapman
