= Joe Humphries =

English cricketer

Personal information
- Full name: Joseph Humphries
- Born: 19 May 1876; Stonebroom, Derbyshire, England
- Died: 7 May 1946 (aged 69); Chesterfield, England
- Batting: Right-handed
- Role: Wicket-keeper

International information
- National side: England
- Test debut: 1 January 1908 v Australia
- Last Test: 7 February 1908 v Australia

Domestic team information
- Years: Team
- 1899–1914: Derbyshire
- 1904–1914: Marylebone Cricket Club (MCC)

Career statistics
Competition	Tests	First-class
Matches	3	302
Runs scored	44	5,464
Batting average	8.80	14.19
100s/50s	0/0	0/0
Top score	16	68
Balls bowled	0	61
Wickets	0	3
Bowling average	n/a	14.33
5 wickets in innings	0	0
10 wickets in match	0	0
Best bowling	n/a	1/5
Catches/stumpings	7/0	564/111
- Source: CricketArchive, 26 April 2010

Joseph Humphries (19 May 1876 – 7 May 1946) was an English cricketer who played three Test matches for England in Australia in 1907–08 and played first-class cricket for Derbyshire and the Marylebone Cricket Club between 1899 and 1914.

Humphries was born in Stonebroom, Derbyshire, the son of John Thomas Humphries and his wife Eliza. His father was a coal miner.

Humphries was a wicket-keeper who made his first-class debut for Derbyshire in the 1899 season. However, with William Storer in place, he did not earn a regular place in the Derbyshire side until the 1902 season. Humphries was party to a dramatic finish in the second Test in Melbourne in January 1908, when as tailender he put on 34, and England won by one wicket. His career ended with the start of the First World War.

Humphries married Annie Kirk of Nether Langwith at Cuckney in April 1910. He died in Chesterfield, Derbyshire, a few days before his 70th birthday.
