= Levi Wright =

English footballer and cricketer

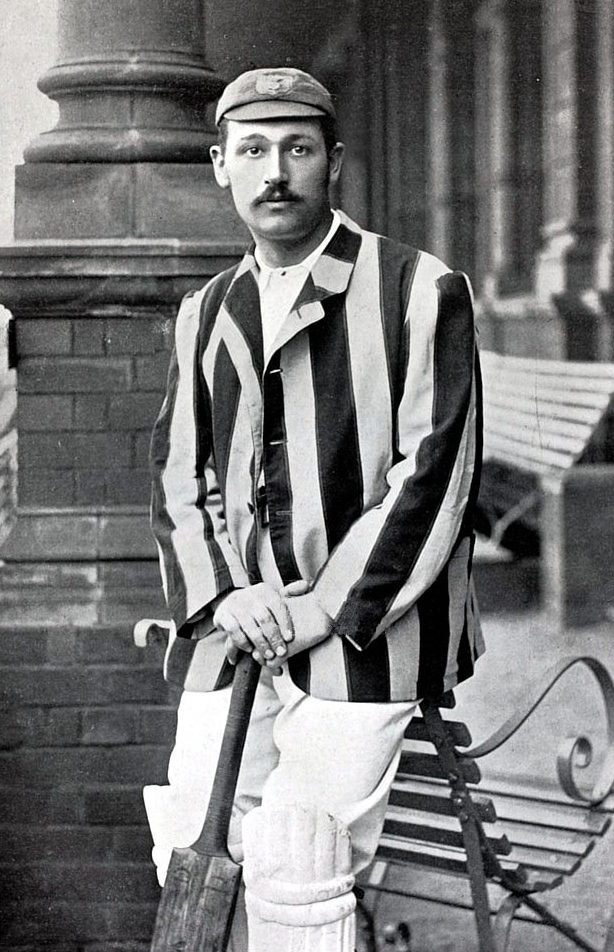
- Wright pictured in the 1890s

Personal information
- Full name: Levi George Wright
- Born: 15 January 1862; Oxford, England
- Died: 11 January 1953 (aged 90); Normanton, Derbyshire, England
- Batting: Right-handed

Domestic team information
- Years: Team
- 1883–1909: Derbyshire
- FC debut: 30 July 1883 Derbyshire v Sussex
- Last FC: 26 August 1909 Derbyshire v Nottinghamshire

Career statistics
Competition	First-class
Matches	325
Runs scored	15,166
Batting average	26.10
100s/50s	20/72
Top score	195
Balls bowled	295
Wickets	1
Bowling average	204.00
5 wickets in innings	0
10 wickets in match	0
Best bowling	1/4
Catches/stumpings	237/6
- Source: CricketArchive, 9 February 2010

Levi George Wright (15 January 1862 – 11 January 1953) was an English footballer and first-class cricketer. He played association football for Derby County and Notts County and cricket for Derbyshire from 1883 to 1909 being captain for a season and a half in 1906–07. He scored over 15,000 runs in his first-class career and took 237 catches. He was one of nineteen sportsman who achieved the Derbyshire Double of playing cricket for Derbyshire and football for Derby County.

Wright was born at Oxford and moved to Derby in 1881 to become a teacher at St Anne's School. He first played for the Napier Cricket Club, a pub team based at 'Sir Charles Napier' in Derby and then for the Derby Midland Club. He played for Derbyshire from 1883 through to 1909, his career including the period from 1888 to 1894 when Derbyshire were demoted from first-class status because of poor results. They were reinstated in 1894 and admitted to the County Championship in 1895. He captained Derbyshire for part of 1906 and for the whole season in 1907, although the team finished bottom of the Championship in both seasons.

Wright was a right-handed batsman and a renowned fieldsman at point. He also occasionally kept wicket. Wright made almost 15,000 runs for Derbyshire at an average of 26 runs per innings. His best seasons came as he got older: he scored 1,000 runs in a season six times, the first when he was 37 years old, and his best season of all was 1905, when in all matches he scored 1,855 runs, at an average of more than 42 runs per innings. The citation as a Wisden Cricketer of the Year in the 1906 edition of Wisden paid tribute not just to his run-getting at the age of 43, but also his continued quick reactions as a fielder. He took many brilliant catches, standing within four or five yards of the bat, and on one occasion came in so close that he caught the bat instead of the ball.

== Football career ==
Levi Wright played association football for local club Derby Midland from 1887 until 1888. He was signed by Derby County before the inaugural Football League season began in September 1888.

Levi Wright, playing at centre–half, made his Derby County and League debut on 29 September 1888 at County Ground, the then home of Derby County. The visitors were Preston North End and Derby County lost the match 3–2. Levi Wright also scored his debut and only League goal in this match. He scored Derby County' second goal to put Derby County 2–0 in the lead. On 13 October 1888 Levi Wright was supplanted as the oldest Derby County League player by William Chatterton. Wright appeared in four of the 22 League matches played by Derby County in season 1888–89.

Levi Wright only played the four League matches for Derby County, scoring the one goal, and was not retained for 1889–90 season and was signed by Notts County but he never played for them and never played top-flight football again.

Wright died at Normanton, Derbyshire at the age of nearly 91.

== Football statistics ==
Appearances and goals by club, season and competition
Club	Season	League			FA Cup		Total	
Club	Season	Division	Apps	Goals	Apps	Goals	Apps	Goals
Derby County	1888–89	The Football League	4	1	0	0	4	1
Notts County	1889–90	Football League	0	0	0	0	0	0

== See also ==
- List of English cricket and football players

Sporting positions
Preceded by Albert Lawton	Derbyshire cricket captains 1906–1908	Succeeded by Albert Lawton
