= Billy Bestwick =

English cricketer

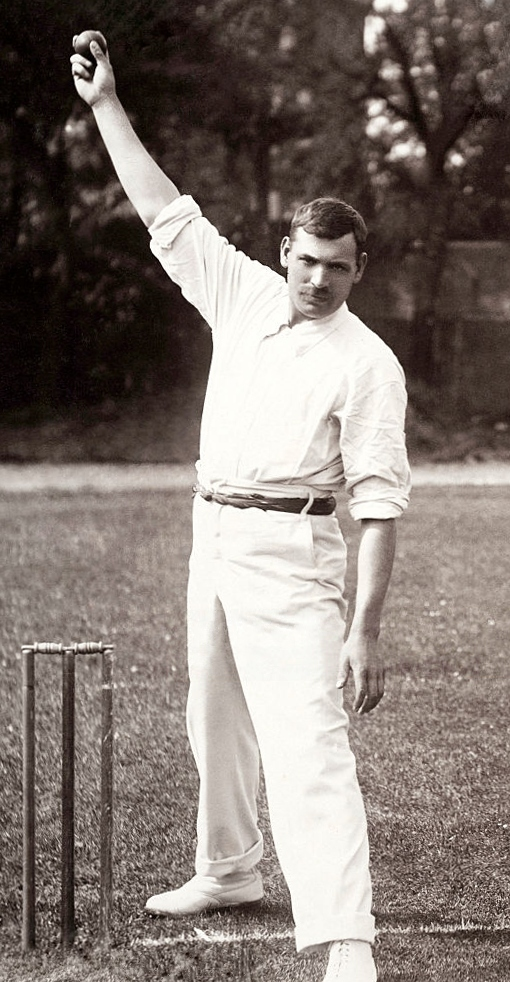
- Bestwick pictured around 1908

Personal information
- Full name: William Bestwick
- Born: 24 February 1875; Heanor, Derbyshire, England
- Died: 2 May 1938 (aged 63); Nottingham, England
- Batting: Right-handed
- Bowling: Right-arm fast-medium

Domestic team information
- Years: Team
- 1898–1925: Derbyshire
- 1914: Glamorgan
- FC debut: 16 May 1898 Derbyshire v Nottinghamshire
- Last FC: 1 August 1925 Derbyshire v Warwickshire

Career statistics
Competition	First-class
Matches	323
Runs scored	1,607
Batting average	4.71
100s/50s	0/0
Top score	39
Balls bowled	70,843
Wickets	1,457
Bowling average	21.28
5 wickets in innings	104
10 wickets in match	27
Best bowling	10/40
Catches/stumpings	90/–
- Source: CricketArchive, 26 April 2010

William Bestwick (24 February 1875 – 2 May 1938) was an English cricketer who played for Derbyshire between 1898 and 1926. He was a medium-fast bowler who took over 1,400 wickets in his career, including 10 in one innings.

== Early life ==
Bestwick was born on Tag Hill, Heanor, Derbyshire. He was the son of a miner and started working at Coppice Pit at the age of 11. He debuted on the Derbyshire team in 1898, while still working in the mine in winter.

== Career ==
Bestwick is one of only two bowlers to have hit ten wickets in a single innings for Derbyshire, which he achieved in June 1921; the other was five-time Test cricketer Tommy Mitchell. He never averaged above eight with the bat in a single season for Derbyshire and did not ever reach twenty in his last two hundred and eighty first-class innings, a run of batting failures equalled only by Eric Hollies between 1939 and 1954.

Though Bestwick finished with the second-weakest average of his debut season, he had the best bowling figures of 4–163. Thanks to the best single batting performance of his career, an innings of 39 against Surrey, Derbyshire bested Leicestershire and Hampshire in the season's championship table.

Derbyshire hosted a team of South Africans in 1901, as they played a series of eleven warm-up matches against English county sides prior to a Test series against the English cricket team. The Derbyshire team once again finished in bottom place in the table. The following year, Derbyshire finished in their highest position since the beginning of Bestwick's career, tenth place.

In 1903, Derbyshire finished twelfth, though the following season saw Derbyshire back up to tenth place, and Bestwick with one more ten-wicket match. During the 1904 season, Bestwick hit an average of under 30 again.

Bestwick became an alcoholic after his wife left him in 1906, and this adversely affected his cricketing career. In January 1907, after a night's drinking, he killed a man named William Brown in a fight, although the inquest at the pub the next day brought in a verdict of 'justifiable homicide.'

In 1909, Bestwick played in his final County Championship game for ten years. He was fired and went to South Wales, where he remarried and played for Glamorgan in the Minor Counties Championship in 1914.

In 1919, 44-year-old Bestwick was invited to rejoin Derbyshire. Derbyshire finished in ninth place. In 1920, Bestwick played just one game for the team.

Bestwick, aged fifty, played seven games in his final season in 1925. He became an umpire and umpired 238 first-class matches, including three Tests in 1929 and 1930, the last of which was played less than a year before he died.

== Personal life ==
Bestwick's son, Robert Bestwick, later served as a Derbyshire cricketer, and they played two games together during the 1922 season.

Bestwick died in 1938 in Standard Hill, Nottingham.
