= Derbyshire County Cricket Club in 1911 =

1911 season of an English cricket team

Derbyshire County Cricket Club seasons
1911 season
- Captain: John Chapman
- County Championship: 14
- Most runs: Samuel Cadman
- Most wickets: Arnold Warren
- Most catches: Joe Humphries

Derbyshire County Cricket Club in 1911 represents the cricket season when the English club Derbyshire had been playing for forty years. It was their seventeenth season in the County Championship and, winning two matches, the side ended fourteenth in the Championship table, staying just off the bottom.

== 1911 season ==
Derbyshire CCC played eighteen games in the County Championship in 1911 and no other matches. The captain for the year was John Chapman in his second season as captain. Samuel Cadman was top scorer with two centuries, although Chapman, who was not out five times ended with a better average. Arnold Warren took 79 wickets.

Archibald Slater and John Corbet made their debuts for the side as did Archibald Wickstead and Arthur Wood who only played two seasons. Eric Murray also made his debut but returned to South Africa at the end of the season. Charles Freeman, William Webster and Frederick Forman all played one game each which were their only appearances for Derbyshire.

=== Matches ===
List of matches
No.	Date	V	Result	Margin	Notes
1	15 May 1911	Yorkshire; Bramall Lane, Sheffield	Lost	Innings and 47 runs	Rhodes 100; A Warren 6-99; Hirst 6-26
2	22 May 1911	Lancashire; Old Trafford, Manchester	Won	2 runs	A Warren 7-61
3	25 May 1911	Yorkshire; Queen's Park, Chesterfield	Lost	Innings and 75 runs	Denton 113; Drake 147*; Rhodes 7-16
4	01 Jun 1911	Hampshire; County Ground, Southampton	Lost	20 runs	C B Fry 150; A Morton 101; L Oliver 101; T Forrester 6-30; Evans 6-81
5	05 Jun 1911	Essex; County Ground, Leyton	Lost	9 Wickets	SWA Cadman 103 and 5-133; Gillingham 128; Buckenham 6-118;
6	08 Jun 1911	Northamptonshire; County Ground, Northampton	Won	59 Runs	A Warren 6-88; T Forrester 6-39
7	12 Jun 1911	Surrey; County Ground, Derby	Lost	Innings and 13 runs	Hayes 109; Smith 7-62
8	19 Jun 1911	Warwickshire; Miners Welfare Ground, Blackwell	Lost	14 runs	A Warren 6-64 and 5-74; Field 5-52;
9	22 Jun 1911	Leicestershire; Aylestone Road, Leicester	Drawn		A Warren 6-98;
10	26 Jun 1911	Hampshire; At County Ground, Derby	Lost	5 Wickets	Kennedy 5-46 and 5-38
11	01 Jul 1911	Northamptonshire; Queen's Park, Chesterfield	Lost	107 runs	A Warren 5-55; Thompson 5-41 and 6-65
12	13 Jul 1911	Lancashire; County Ground, Derby	Lost	Innings and 141 runs	W Tyldesley 152; J Tyldesley 125; Sharp 5-14; Dean 6-104
13	24 Jul 1911	Surrey; Kennington Oval	Lost	Innings and 214 runs	Hayward 202; Bush 135; Goatly 105; SWA Cadman 5-133; T Forrester 5-161; Hitch 7-72; Rushby 5-52
14	29 Jul 1911	Leicestershire; Queen's Park, Chesterfield	Drawn		Sharp 216; SWA Cadman 116
15	07 Aug 1911	Essex; County Ground, Derby	Lost	7 Wickets	Buckenham 5-76
16	10 Aug 1911	Warwickshire; Edgbaston, Birmingham	Lost	165 runs	W Quaife 144; T Forrester 6-68; Field 5-96; Foster 6-37
17	14 Aug 1911	Nottinghamshire; Trent Bridge, Nottingham	Drawn		Hardstaff 118; E Needham103; Iremonger 6-67; A Warren 6-131
18	26 Aug 1911	Nottinghamshire; Miners Welfare Ground, Blackwell	Lost	6 Wickets	Wass 5-70; Iremonger 5-78; A Morton 9-71;

== Statistics ==
=== County Championship batting averages ===
Name	Matches	Inns	Runs	High score	Average	100s
J Chapman	17	33	854	96	30.50	0
A Morton	12	23	628	101	29.90	1
SWA Cadman	18	35	1036	116	29.60	2
L Oliver	18	35	867	101	26.27	1
T Forrester	16	31	663	73	22.86	0
A Wickstead	12	22	372	68	19.57	0
E Needham	15	29	530	103	18.92	1
AJ Wood	5	9	151	52	16.77	0
AG Slater	11	21	317	43*	16.68	0
CJ Corbett	4	8	125	49	15.62	0
J Humphries	18	35	468	66	15.60	0
CF Root	15	28	341	48*	14.82	0
FA Newton	2	4	38	35	9.50	0
FH Taylor	1	2	18	18	9.00	0
HFD Jelf	5	10	87	26	8.70	0
R Sale	2	3	25	14	8.33	0
A Warren	16	30	149	15	6.77	0
N Buxton	1	2	4	4*	4.00	0
FA Barber	2	4	11	10	3.66	0
CR Freeman	1	2	7	4	3.50	0
EC Murray	3	6	16	9	2.66	0
W Webster	1	2	3	3	1.50	0
FG Forman	1	2	3	3	1.50	0
HE Bowmer	1	2	1	1	0.50	0
RB Rickman	1	2	0	0	0.00	0

=== County Championship bowling averages ===
Name	Balls	Runs	Wickets	BB	Average
A Warren	4056	2022	79	7-61	25.59
T Forrester	3274	1580	62	6-30	25.48
SWA Cadman	3521	1605	41	5-133	39.14
A Morton	1718	836	27	9-71	30.96
CF Root	1023	586	14	4-72	41.85
AG Slater	502	249	11	3-28	22.63
R Sale	116	82	3	1-7	27.33
FA Barber	174	105	1	1-42	105.00
EC Murray	88	40	1	1-16	40.00
L Oliver	144	115	0		
RB Rickman	78	95	0		
J Chapman	66	55	0		
AJ Wood	48	48	0		
CJ Corbett	42	22	0		
N Buxton	18	14	0		
A Wickstead	6	2	0		

== County Championship Wicket Keeping ==
- J Humphries Catches 36, Stumpings 11

== See also ==
- Derbyshire County Cricket Club seasons
- 1911 English cricket season
