= Derbyshire County Cricket Club in 1912 =

1912 season of an English cricket team

Derbyshire County Cricket Club seasons
1912 season
- Captain: John Chapman
- County Championship: 12
- Most runs: Samuel Cadman
- Most wickets: Arthur Morton
- Most catches: Joe Humphries

Derbyshire County Cricket Club in 1912 was the cricket season when the English club Derbyshire had been playing for forty one years. It was their eighteenth season in the County Championship and they won two matches to finish tenth in the Championship table.

== 1912 season ==
Derbyshire played twenty matches, of which eighteen were in the County Championship and the others against touring South Africans and Australians. John Chapman was in his third year as captain. In one of the wettest summers on record, no players scored centuries. Samuel Cadman scored most runs, and had one of the team's two innings in the nineties. Arthur Morton took most wickets.

Significant players who made their debut in the season were Richard Baggallay who went on to captain the side and Geoffrey Jackson whose death in World War I deprived the club of a useful player. New players who had shorter careers were George Burnham and Albert Blount who each played five game in the 1912 season. That was the extent of Burnham's career, but Blount reappeared in one more match fourteen years later.

=== Matches ===
List of matches
No.	Date	V	Result	Margin	Notes
1	4 May 1912	South Africans; County Ground, Derby	Lost	7 wickets	A Morton 6–52; Faulkner 5–46
2	13 May 1912	Warwickshire; Edgbaston, Birmingham	Lost	Innings and 22 runs	Field 5–60
3	20 May 1912	Lancashire; Queen's Park, Chesterfield	Drawn		
4	23 May 1912	Sussex; County Ground, Hove	Lost	8 wickets	SWA Cadman 95; AG Slater 5–80; Sims 5–39
5	27 May 1912	Essex; County Ground, Leyton	Lost	Innings and 27 runs	Perrin 245; McGahey 150
6	30 May 1912	Hampshire; County Ground, Southampton	Drawn		L Oliver 94; Barrett 119; A Warren 5–129
7	3 Jun 1912	Sussex; County Ground, Derby	Drawn		A Morton 5–44; Cox 8–24
8	6 Jun 1912	Somerset; Recreation Ground, Bath	Drawn		Greswell 5–54; A Morton 7–16
9	13 Jun 1912	Hampshire; County Ground, Derby	Lost	54 runs	A Morton 6–59; Kenedy 5–26; Newman 5–30; A Warren 6–59; Brown 6–77
10	20 Jun 1912	Leicestershire; Bath Grounds, Ashby-de-la-Zouch	Won	83 runs	King 6–65; A Warren 7–52
11	24 Jun 1912	Warwickshire; County Ground, Derby	Drawn		
12	29 Jun 1912	Northamptonshire; Queen's Park, Chesterfield	Drawn		East 6–58; A Warren 5–31
13	4 Jul 1912	Nottinghamshire; Trent Bridge, Nottingham	Lost	Innings and 147 runs	Wass 5–50 and 5–20
14	15 Jul 1912	Somerset; County Ground, Derby	Won	133 runs	Greswell 8–65; A Warren 5–50
15	25 Jul 1912	Leicestershire; Queen's Park, Chesterfield	Drawn		A Morton 5–73
16	1 Aug 1912	Australians; County Ground, Derby	Drawn		T Forrester 5–76; Matthews 6–23; A Morton 5–52
17	5 Aug 1912	Essex; County Ground, Derby	Drawn		
18	8 Aug 1912	Lancashire; Old Trafford, Manchester	Lost	248 runs	Whitehead 100; Makepeace 99; Dean 6–110 and 6–53
19	17 Aug 1912	Northamptonshire; County Ground, Northampton	Lost	6 wickets	Thompson 5–42; T Forrester 7–18; Smith 6–26
20	26 Aug 1912	Nottinghamshire; Miners Welfare Ground, Blackwell	Drawn		Iremonger 6–38

== Statistics ==
=== County Championship batting averages ===
Name	Matches	Inns	Runs	High score	Average	100s
SWA Cadman	18	27	673	95	28.04	0
L Oliver	18	28	666	94	25.61	0
A Morton	16	25	533	83	24.22	0
G Beet	3	4	23	8*	23.00	0
J Bowden	8	10	130	32	18.57	0
FA Newton	3	4	16	13*	16.00	0
A Warren	18	26	358	77	14.91	0
T Forrester	16	23	278	84*	14.63	0
J Humphries	15	21	231	42	12.83	0
AJ Wood	8	10	113	25	12.55	0
AG Slater	18	24	256	45	11.13	0
CF Root	15	21	218	55	10.38	0
FC Bracey	10	12	55	22*	9.16	0
J Chapman	8	14	115	56	8.21	0
R Sale	4	6	37	13	6.16	0
GJ Burnham	5	6	30	15	6.00	0
RRC Baggallay	1	2	8	8	4.00	0
A Wickstead	1	2	7	6	3.50	0
E Needham	3	4	14	6	3.50	0
CJ Corbett	4	5	12	6	2.40	0
GL Jackson	1	1	2	2	2.00	0
C Lowe	1	1	2	2	2.00	0
A Blount	4	6	5	5	0.83	0

=== County Championship bowling averages ===
Name	Balls	Runs	Wickets	BB	Average
A Morton	2995	1115	45	7–16	24.77
SWA Cadman	2124	743	40	4–28	18.57
A Warren	1585	791	40	7–52	19.77
T Forrester	1661	449	22	7–18	20.40
FC Bracey	758	336	20	4–43	16.80
AG Slater	943	473	14	5–80	33.78
CF Root	489	267	10	3–23	26.70
A Blount	270	110	5	4–53	22.00
GL Jackson	60	29	1	1–29	29.00
C Lowe	36	20	1	1–20	20.00
L Oliver	30	28	1	1–28	28.00
J Chapman	48	54	0		
AJ Wood	24	16	0		
R Sale	6	0	0		

=== Wicket Keepers ===
- Joe Humphries Catches 24, Stumping 7
- G Beet Catches 3, Stumping 1

== See also ==
- Derbyshire County Cricket Club seasons
- 1912 English cricket season
