= Derbyshire County Cricket Club in 1910 =

1910 season of an English cricket team

Derbyshire County Cricket Club seasons
1910 season
- Captain: John Chapman
- County Championship: 15
- Most runs: Ernest Needham
- Most wickets: Arthur Morton
- Most catches: Joe Humphries

Derbyshire County Cricket Club in 1910 was the cricket season when the English club Derbyshire had been playing for thirty nine years. It was their sixteenth season in the County Championship and they won two matches to finish fifteenth in the Championship table.

== 1910 season ==
Derbyshire played twenty two matches, all in the County Championship and won two and lost fourteen. Their two victories were courtesy of Leicestershire. John Chapman was in his first year as captain. Ernest Needham scored most runs, and Arthur Morton took most wickets.

Among the draws, the season produced one of the most memorable matches against Warwickshire at Blackwell in 1910 and not just a Derbyshire record 9th wicket partnership, but a world record 9th wicket partnership of 283 which still stands. At lunch time on the last day Derbyshire with eight second innings wickets down, were far behind Warwickshire's first innings score and Warwickshire looked certain of a comfortable win. Chapman and Arnold Warren were batting. William Taylor wrote "In view of their strong position, Warwickshire, I knew, were hoping to catch an early afternoon train, and, in conversation during the interval, I remarked to their fast bowler, Frank Field: You look like catching your train all right, Frank. The reply was, I'm not so sure about that, Mr. Taylor. These chaps are pretty good bats, you know. How right he was. Chapman and Warren made their runs in less than three hours and Warwickshire had to be content with a draw." Chapman scored 165 and Arnold Warren 123.

Fred Root who became an international player and played five seasons for Derbyshire made his debut in 1910. Henry Jelf who retired from the navy played occasional games in this and the following season. Bertie Corbett, James Handford and Stanley Holden made their debuts and played a few games but only in the 1910 season. Charles Newcombe, who died in the war and Arthur Marsden who died six years later at St Pancras, played their only first class games in the season.

=== Matches ===
List of matches
No.	Date	V	Result	Margin	Notes
1	5 May 1910	Surrey; Kennington Oval	Drawn		W Smith 8–35; A Morton 6–71
2	9 May 1910	Sussex; County Ground, Derby	Lost	8 wickets	A Warren 6–64
3	12 May 1910	Lancashire; North Road Ground, Glossop	Lost	128 runs	Huddleston 8–31; A Morton 5–69
4	16 May 1910	Essex; County Ground, Leyton	Lost	4 wickets	G Curgenven 100; Tremlin 5–42; Mead 6–71
5	19 May 1910	Sussex; The Saffrons, Eastbourne	Drawn		Cox 6–52; SWA Cadman 5–36; Relf 5–68
6	26 May 1910	Yorkshire; Queen's Park, Chesterfield	Lost	Innings and 142 runs	Rothery 134; Denton 182
7	2 Jun 1910	Kent; County Ground, Derby	Lost	304 runs	Seymour 124; Hutchings 122; Blythe 6–36; A Warren 8–152; Wooley 5–35
8	9 Jun 1910	Surrey; County Ground, Derby	Lost	10 wickets	Hobbs 133; W Smith 7–36; A Warren 5–94; Lees 5–41
9	18 Jun 1910	Warwickshire; Miners Welfare Ground, Blackwell	Drawn		Charlesworth 216; A Warren 123; J Chapman 165; Foster 5–62;
10	25 Jun 1910	Northamptonshire; Queen's Park, Chesterfield	Lost	130 runs	A Morton 5–142 and 5–76; Thompson 6–75 and 6–47
11	2 Jul 1910	Leicestershire; County Ground, Derby	Won	6 wickets	A Warren 6–59
12	7 Jul 1910	Kent; Bat and Ball Ground, Gravesend	Lost	6 wickets	Blythe 6–60 and 5–63; A Warren 5–71
13	11 Jul 1910	Leicestershire; Aylestone Road, Leicester	Won	42 runs	E Needham 159; L Oliver 104; Coe 101; Jayes 6–72; A Morton 6–50
14	14 Jul 1910	Nottinghamshire; Trent Bridge, Nottingham	Drawn		A Morton 7–90 and 5–150
15	18 Jul 1910	Hampshire; County Ground, Southampton	Lost	Innings and 15 runs	A Morton 7–144; Newman 7–77
16	25 Jul 1910	Yorkshire; Park Avenue Cricket Ground, Bradford	Lost	Innings and 101 runs	Hirst 5–35; Booth 5–34; Rhodes 5–5
17	1 Aug 1910	Essex; County Ground, Derby	Lost	271 runs	A Morton 6–83; Buckenham 6–49 and 5–31; A Warren 5–86
18	4 Aug 1910	Warwickshire; Edgbaston, Birmingham	Lost	143 runs	A Warren 5–81; Foster 6–65 and 6–51
19	8 Aug 1910	Hampshire; Queen's Park, Chesterfield	Lost	102 runs	White 117; A Morton 8–117
20	13 Aug 1910	Northamptonshire; County Ground, Northampton	Lost	6 wickets	SWA Cadman 6–80; Wells 5–55
21	18 Aug 1910	Nottinghamshire; Miners Welfare Ground, Blackwell	Drawn		G Curgenven 109
22	22 Aug 1910	Lancashire; Aigburth, Liverpool	Drawn		34 overs played for 38 runs

== Statistics ==
=== County Championship batting averages ===
Name	Matches	Inns	Runs	High score	Average	100s
G Curgenven	7	11	371	109	33.72	2
R Sale	4	8	207	69	29.57	0
T Forrester	10	16	297	78	22.84	0
E Needham	22	42	889	159	21.68	1
J Chapman	20	36	713	165	20.97	1
A Morton	22	41	773	89	20.34	0
SWA Cadman	20	40	753	84	19.30	0
AE Lawton	1	2	37	36	18.50	0
FA Newton	12	23	333	87	16.65	0
A Warren	22	41	610	123	16.48	1
L Oliver	17	30	420	104*	15.55	1
J Humphries	21	35	369	65	15.37	0
HFD Jelf	5	10	133	37	13.30	0
RB Rickman	7	11	113	34	11.30	0
CF Root	8	11	100	49	11.11	0
G Grainger	1	2	11	10*	11.00	0
H Cooper	1	2	21	14	10.50	0
GR Gregory	1	1	10	10	10.00	0
J Handford	9	17	137	23	9.78	0
TA Higson	3	6	49	36	8.16	0
WT Taylor	2	4	29	10	7.25	0
J Bowden	5	9	63	30	7.00	0
ST Langton	1	1	6	6	6.00	0
C Lowe	3	5	21	17	5.25	0
FC Bracey	5	9	15	7*	5.00	0
FH Taylor	4	8	31	12	4.42	0
A Howcroft	2	4	17	10	4.25	0
A Marsden	1	2	6	6	3.00	0
SM Holden	3	4	7	6	2.33	0
BO Corbett	1	2	1	1	0.50	0
CN Newcombe	1	2	1	1	0.50	0

=== County Championship bowling averages ===
Name	Balls	Runs	Wickets	BB	Average
A Morton	5700	2630	116	8–117	22.67
A Warren	4521	2392	85	8–152	28.14
SWA Cadman	3663	1586	67	6–80	23.67
RB Rickman	432	243	7	2–30	34.71
T Forrester	408	184	6	4–7	30.66
CF Root	220	102	5	2–39	20.40
FC Bracey	330	168	4	2–27	42.00
L Oliver	126	79	3	2–20	26.33
TA Higson	58	42	2	1–0	21.00
C Lowe	97	48	1	1–37	48.00
J Chapman	6	8	0		
G Curgenven	24	17	0		
G Grainger	54	30	0		
J Handford	36	31	0		
SM Holden	96	39	0		
R Sale	72	54	0		
AE Lawton	30	21	0		
E Needham	54	29	0		
CN Newcombe	72	32	0		
FA Newton	12	21	0		

=== Wicket-keeper ===
- Joe Humphries Catches 35, Stumping 7

== See also ==
- Derbyshire County Cricket Club seasons
- 1910 English cricket season
