= 1912 English cricket season =

1912 was the 23rd season of County Championship cricket in England. The much-criticised Triangular Tournament of Test Matches was held between England, Australia and South Africa. The contest was affected by one of the wettest summers on record and was never repeated. England retained the Ashes, having defeated Australia in one Test.

== Honours ==
- County Championship – Yorkshire
- Minor Counties Championship – in abeyance
- Wisden (special commemoration) – John Wisden

== Test series ==
England won one of its matches against weakened Australia 1–0 with two drawn. Against South Africa, England won all three matches. Despite the loss of seven key players due to a major dispute with management and professional commitments, Australia beat South Africa 2–0 with one match drawn.

Cumulative record	1876–1912
England	40
Australia	35
Drawn	19

== County Championship ==
	County	Played	Won	Lost	First Innings			Points		%
	County	Played	Won	Lost	Won	Lost	No result	Poss	Obtd	%
1	Yorkshire	28	13	1	7	4	3 (Note: The matches between Yorkshire and Surrey at Sheffield, Lancashire and Essex at Manchester, Gloucestershire at Nottinghamshire at Gloucester, Gloucestershire and Surrey at Cheltenham, and Lancashire and Warwickshire at Manchester were abandoned without a ball being bowled. All these are included in the "No Result" column.)	125	90	72.00
2	Northamptonshire	18	10	1	2	4	1	85	60	70.58
3	Kent	26	14	5	3	3	1	125	82	65.60
4	Lancashire	22	8	2	4	3	5	85	55	64.70
5	Middlesex	20	7	4	5	2	2	90	52	57.77
6	Hampshire	24	7	3	4	4	6	90	51	56.66
7	Surrey	26	7	5	6	5	3	115	58	50.43
8	Nottinghamshire	18	5	5	5	2	1	85	42	49.41
9	Warwickshire	22	6	5	3	4	4	90	43	47.44
10	Sussex	28	6	10	6	4	2	130	52	40.00
11	Gloucestershire	18	3	8	1	1	5	65	19	29.23
12	Derbyshire	18	2	7	2	3	4	70	19	27.14
13	Leicestershire	22	3	13	2	2	2	100	23	23.00
14	Somerset	16	2	8	1	3	2	70	16	22.85
15	Essex	18	1	8	2	3	4	70	14	20.00
16	Worcestershire	20	1	10	0	6	3	85	11	12.94
Details as recorded in John Wisden’s Cricketers’ Almanack

- Five points were awarded for a win.
- Three points were awarded for "winning" the first innings of a drawn match.
- One point was awarded for "losing" the first innings of a drawn match.
- Matches in which no result was achieved on the first innings were not included in calculating maximum possible points.
- Final placings were decided by calculating the percentage of possible points.

== Minor Counties Championship ==
Carmarthenshire dropped out of the competition for this season. Following a recommendation by Earl Norman in November 1911, the system used between 1907 and 1911 of grouping the Minor Counties by division was abandoned for 1912, and each county had to play minimum of four other counties.

In an unfortunate sequel to the season that would be repeated in 1933, the championship was listed as "in abeyance". According to the rules, Norfolk and Staffordshire, who finished first and second but had not met during the season, should have played a challenge match. However, Norfolk first said they could not play due to flooding at the end of August. Then Norfolk found that when the match was to be played, many of its best players had got away and the club could not raise a team. Originally it was thought Staffordshire would win the Championship by default, but after a lengthy inquiry the Minor Counties Cricket Association ruled on 26 September that the Championship would not be awarded, viewing the circumstances Norfolk were placed in as "exceptional".

1912 Minor Counties Championship table
	County	Played	Won	First innings			Points		%
	County	Played	Won	Won	Lost	No result	Poss	Obtd	%
1	Norfolk	8	7	1	0	0	40	38	95.00
2	Staffordshire	12	5	3	0	4	40	34	85.00
3	Surrey Second Eleven	7 (Note: This excludes the match Suffolk v. Surrey Second Eleven at Felixstowe that was abandoned without a ball being bowled)	3	2	1	1	30	22	73.33
4	Buckinghamshire	6 (Note: This excludes two matches – v. Berkshire at High Wycombe and against Hertfordshire at Bushey – abandoned without a ball being bowled.)	3	1	1	0	30	19	63.33
5	Hertfordshire	9 (Note: Excluding the match v. Buckinghamshire at Bushey abandoned without a ball being bowled)	3	4	1	0	45	28	62.22
6	Durham	8	3	1	2	1	35	20	57.14
6	Northumberland	8	2	3	1	1	35	20	57.14
8	Cornwall	8	4	0	2	0	40	22	55.00
8	Devon	8	3	2	1	0	40	22	55.00
9	Glamorgan	8	3	1	0	1	35	18	51.42
11	Kent Second Eleven	8	3	0	2	1	35	17	48.57
11	Lincolnshire	7 (Note: This excludes the match Cambridgeshire v. Lincolnshire at Cambridge that was abandoned without a ball being bowled.)	2	2	1	0	35	17	48.57
13	Dorset	8	0	4	0	1	35	12	34.28
14	Wiltshire	8	1	1	3	0	40	11	27.50
15	Berkshire	7 (Note: Excluding the match against Buckinghamshire at High Wycombe that was abandoned without a ball being bowled)	1	1	1	0	35	9	25.71
16	Cambridgeshire	9	0	2	3	0	45	9	20.00
16	Monmouthshire	8	1	0	2	1	35	7	20.00
18	Bedfordshire	8	1	0	2	0	40	7	17.50
19	Suffolk	7	0	1	3	0	35	6	17.14
20	Cheshire	8	0	0	3	1	35	3	8.57

- Five points were awarded for a win.
- Three points were awarded for "winning" the first innings of a drawn match.
- One point was awarded for "losing" the first innings of a drawn match.
- Matches in which no result was achieved on the first innings were not included in calculating maximum possible points.
- Final placings were decided by calculating the percentage of possible points.

== Leading batsmen (qualification 20 innings) ==
1912 English season leading batsmen
Name	Team	Matches	Innings	Not outs	Runs	Highest score	Average	100s
C. B. Fry	Hampshire	15	26	2	1728	258 not out	72.00	7
Alexander Johnston	Hampshire	14	20	1	1044	175	54.94	3
Warren Bardsley	Australians	36	52	6	2365	184 not out	51.41	8
Phil Mead	Hampshire	34	52	14	1933	160 not out	50.86	7
Charlie Macartney	Australians	33	49	1	2187	208	48.06	6
Jack Sharp	Lancashire	24	34	3	1375	211	44.35	4
Ranjitsinhji	Sussex	19	28	2	1113	176	42.80	4
David Denton	Yorkshire	38	54	4	2127	221	42.54	6
Reggie Spooner	Lancashire	33	49	3	1939	130	42.15	7
Frank Woolley	Kent	35	49	5	1827	117	41.52	2

== Leading bowlers (qualification 1,000 balls) ==
1912 English season leading bowlers
Name	Team	Matches	Balls bowled	Runs conceded	Wickets taken	Average	Best bowling	5 wickets in innings	10 wickets in match
Sydney Barnes	England	11	2320	782	69	11.33	8/29	8	3
Douglas Carr	Kent	11	1553	733	61	12.01	8/36	7	2
Colin Blythe	Kent	28	5517	2183	178	12.26	8/26	16	8
Schofield Haigh	Yorkshire	37	4882	1541	125	12.32	9/25	11	3
Sydney Smith	Northamptonshire	22	3354	1269	100	12.69	8/39	8	2
Harry Dean	Lancashire	27	6360	2216	162	13.67	8/59	14	5
Frank Woolley	Kent	35	4236	1802	126	14.30	7/25	11	1
Frank Tarrant	Middlesex; MCC	31	5644	2070	140	14.78	7/40	14	3
Sid Pegler	South Africans	34	7721	2885	189	15.26	7/31	17	3
Aubrey Faulkner	South Africans	36	6091	2514	163	15.42	7/67	16	4

== Annual reviews ==
- John Wisden's Cricketers' Almanack, 1913
