= Derbyshire County Cricket Club in 1909 =

1909 season of an English cricket team

Derbyshire County Cricket Club seasons
1909 season
- Captain: Reginald Rickman
- County Championship: 15
- Most runs: Samuel Cadman
- Most wickets: Arnold Warren
- Most catches: Joe Humphries

Derbyshire County Cricket Club in 1909 was the cricket season when the English club Derbyshire had been playing for 38 years. It was their fifteenth season in the County Championship and they won two matches to finish fifteenth in the Championship table.

== 1909 season ==
Derbyshire played twenty two matches in the County Championship and one against the touring Australians. They won two matches, both in the championship and drew four. Reginald Rickman was in his second season as captain. Samuel Cadman scored most runs and Arnold Warren took most wickets.

Joseph Bowden made his debut in the season and went on to become a regular until 1930. John Chapman, who was captain before and after the war, also played his first season for the club. Other new players were Frederick Newton who appeared over six years and George Grainger who put in intermittent appearances over five years. Herbert Bowmer played the first of three matches in three years and Samuel Langton the first of three matches in two years. Stanley Dickinson and Lemuel Smith made their only two appearances for the club, and Charles Nornable his one career match during the season.

=== Matches ===
List of matches
No.	Date	V	Result	Margin	Notes
1	3 May 1909	Yorkshire; County Ground, Derby	Lost	Innings and 127 runs	
2	10 May 1909	Sussex; County Ground, Derby	Drawn		Heygate 136; Vincett 5-25; A Warren 5-82
3	15 May 1909	Warwickshire; County Ground, Derby	Drawn		A Morton 6-41
4	20 May 1909	Kent; Queen's Park, Chesterfield	Lost	Innings and 141 runs	
5	27 May 1909	Surrey; Kennington Oval	Lost	283 runs	Rushby 5-28 and 5-28; Smith 5-23
6	31 May 1909	Essex; County Ground, Leyton	Lost	4 wickets	A Morton 6-38; Buckenham 6-40
7	7 Jun 1909	Leicestershire; County Ground, Derby	Lost	165 runs	Crawford 107; Jayes 6-62 and 5-77; A Warren 6-86
8	12 Jun 1909	Warwickshire; Bulls Head Ground, Coventry	Won	6 wickets	J Chapman 198; Hargreave 5-81; A Warren 5-85 and 5-110
9	21 Jun 1909	Hampshire; Miners Welfare Ground, Blackwell	Drawn		LLewellyn 5-55; A Warren 5-50; Newman 5-52
10	1 Jul 1909	Surrey; Queen's Park, Chesterfield	Lost	Innings and 76 runs	Davis 112; Smith 7-46; Rushby 6-31
11	8 Jul 1909	Sussex; County Ground, Hove	Lost	Innings and 274 runs	Leach 113; Killick 7-39; Cox 6-65
12	12 Jul 1909	Kent; Nevill Ground, Tunbridge Wells	Lost	Innings and 134 runs	Blythe 8-49; A Morton 5-125
13	15 Jul 1909	Hampshire; County Ground, Southampton	Lost	168 runs	RB Rickman 5-80
14	22 Jul 1909	Australians; County Ground, Derby	Lost	10 wickets	Trumper 113; O'Connor 7-40; A Morton 5-63
15	26 Jul 1909	Northamptonshire; County Ground, Northampton	Lost	Innings and 95 runs	S Smith 7-87 and 7-36
16	29 Jul 1909	Nottinghamshire; North Road Ground, Glossop	Abandoned		
17	2 Aug 1909	Essex; County Ground, Derby	Lost	136 runs	Buckenham 6-41 and 6-38
18	5 Aug 1909	Leicestershire; Aylestone Road, Leicester	Won	2 wickets	SWA Cadman 112; A Warren 5-63
19	12 Aug 1909	Yorkshire; Bramall Lane, Sheffield	Lost	5 wickets	Denton 130; W Bestwick 6-88;
20	16 Aug 1909	Lancashire; Queen's Park, Chesterfield	Lost	150 runs	
21	19 Aug 1909	Northamptonshire; County Ground, Derby	Lost	8 wickets	Thompson 7-56 and 5-51; A Warren 5-107
22	23 Aug 1909	Lancashire; Old Trafford, Manchester	Drawn		Dean 6-30
23	26 Aug 1909	Nottinghamshire; Trent Bridge, Nottingham	Lost	Innings and 94 runs	Gunn 101; A Warren 5-91; Wass 7-42; Hallam 7-29

== Statistics ==
=== County Championship batting averages ===
Name	Matches	Inns	Runs	High score	Average	100s
SWA Cadman	21	41	1002	112	25.05	1
A Morton	19	34	682	76	20.66	0
J Chapman	18	35	543	198	16.96	1
AE Lawton	6	10	166	50	16.60	0
J Humphries	21	38	425	36*	15.17	0
E Needham	21	40	591	60	14.77	0
A Warren	21	38	487	41	13.52	0
L Oliver	15		313	46	12.52	0
LG Wright	21	41	492	44	12.00	0
R Sale	5	10	112	34	11.20	0
RB Rickman	8	14	134	36	10.30	0
G Grainger	2	3	9	6*	9.00	0
FA Newton	2	4	35	30	8.75	0
J Bowden	5	10	82	17	8.20	0
G Curgenven	6	11	90	43	8.18	0
CE Nornable	1	1	8	8	8.00	0
H Cooper	2	3	23	14	7.66	0
FH Taylor	1	2	15	15	7.50	0
W Bestwick	17	30	119	18	7.43	0
FC Bracey	8	16	68	18	6.80	0
SP Dickinson	2	3	13	10*	6.50	0
TA Higson	1	2	8	6	4.00	0
KA Woodward	2	4	12	7	4.00	0
LST Smith	2	3	9	5	3.00	0
ST Langton	2	4	8	4	2.00	0
HE Bowmer	2	4	5	3	1.25	0

=== County Championship bowling averages ===
Name	Balls	Runs	Wickets	BB	Average
A Warren	3966	2093	95	6–86	22.03
W Bestwick	3856	1704	75	6–88	22.72
A Morton	2654	1186	48	6–38	24.70
SWA Cadman	2309	904	30	3–14	30.13
FC Bracey	681	336	13	3–56	25.84
RB Rickman	390	245	12	5–80	20.41
CE Nornable	127	72	5	3–24	14.40
R Sale	234	109	2	2–25	54.50
TA Higson	108	37	2	2–37	18.50
SP Dickinson	78	45	1	1–38	45.00
G Grainger	174	70	1	1–62	70.00
AE Lawton	150	103	1	1–35	103.00
G Curgenven	264	103	0		
J Chapman	24	29	0		
ST Langton	78	42	0		
E Needham	12	7	0		

=== Wicket-keeper ===
- Joe Humphries Catches 29, Stumping 9

== See also ==
- Derbyshire County Cricket Club seasons
- 1909 English cricket season
