= Thomas Higson =

Thomas Higson may refer to:

- Thomas Higson (cricketer, born 1873) (1873–1949), English cricketer
- Thomas Higson (cricketer, born 1911) (1911–1993), his son, English cricketer
