= 1912 County Championship =

English cricket tournament

- Cricket format: First-class cricket
- Tournament format: League system
- Champions: Yorkshire (9th title)
- Participants: 16
- Most runs: David Denton (1,831 for Yorkshire)
- Most wickets: Colin Blythe – (170 for Kent)

The 1912 County Championship was the twenty-third officially organised running of the County Championship. Yorkshire County Cricket Club won their ninth championship title.

Worcestershire finished last for the first time since becoming first-class in 1899, whilst Essex – as high as sixth in 1911 – had their worst season in the Championship to date and won a single game for the only time in their Championship history.

== Table ==
- Five points were awarded for a win.
- Three points were awarded for "winning" the first innings of a drawn match.
- One point was awarded for "losing" the first innings of a drawn match.
- Matches which ended without both teams completing a first innings were added to the "No result" column. Teams won no points for these draws, but these matches were not included in the calculation of possible points.
- Final placings were decided by calculating the percentage of possible points.

| | County | Played | Won | Lost | First Innings | | | Points | | % |
| | County | Played | Won | Lost | Won | Lost | No result | Poss | Obtd | % |
|---|---|---|---|---|---|---|---|---|---|---|
| 1 | Yorkshire | 28 | 13 | 1 | 7 | 4 | 3 (Note: The matches between Yorkshire and Surrey at Sheffield, Lancashire and Essex at Manchester, Gloucestershire at Nottinghamshire at Gloucester, Gloucestershire and Surrey at Cheltenham, and between Lancashire and Warwickshire at Manchester were abandoned without a ball being bowled. All these are included in the "No Result" column.) | 125 | 90 | 72.00 |
| 2 | Northamptonshire | 18 | 10 | 1 | 2 | 4 | 1 | 85 | 60 | 70.58 |
| 3 | Kent | 26 | 14 | 5 | 3 | 3 | 1 | 125 | 82 | 65.60 |
| 4 | Lancashire | 22 | 8 | 2 | 4 | 3 | 5 | 85 | 55 | 64.70 |
| 5 | Middlesex | 20 | 7 | 4 | 5 | 2 | 2 | 90 | 52 | 57.77 |
| 6 | Hampshire | 24 | 7 | 3 | 4 | 4 | 6 | 90 | 51 | 56.66 |
| 7 | Surrey | 26 | 7 | 5 | 6 | 5 | 3 | 115 | 58 | 50.43 |
| 8 | Nottinghamshire | 18 | 5 | 5 | 5 | 2 | 1 | 85 | 42 | 49.41 |
| 9 | Warwickshire | 22 | 6 | 5 | 3 | 4 | 4 | 90 | 43 | 47.44 |
| 10 | Sussex | 28 | 6 | 10 | 6 | 4 | 2 | 130 | 52 | 40.00 |
| 11 | Gloucestershire | 18 | 3 | 8 | 1 | 1 | 5 | 65 | 19 | 29.23 |
| 12 | Derbyshire | 18 | 2 | 7 | 2 | 3 | 4 | 70 | 19 | 27.14 |
| 13 | Leicestershire | 22 | 3 | 13 | 2 | 2 | 2 | 100 | 23 | 23.00 |
| 14 | Somerset | 16 | 2 | 8 | 1 | 3 | 2 | 70 | 16 | 22.85 |
| 15 | Essex | 18 | 1 | 8 | 2 | 3 | 4 | 70 | 14 | 20.00 |
| 16 | Worcestershire | 20 | 1 | 10 | 0 | 6 | 3 | 85 | 11 | 12.94 |

== Records ==
Most runs
| Aggregate | Average | Player | County |
|---|---|---|---|
| 1,831 | 53.85 | David Denton | Yorkshire |
| 1,453 | 46.87 | Ernie Hayes | Surrey |
| 1,397 | 30.36 | Robert Relf | Sussex |
| 1,357 | 32.30 | Joe Vine | Sussex |
| 1,151 | 31.10 | Wally Hardinge | Kent |

Most wickets
| Aggregate | Average | Player | County |
|---|---|---|---|
| 170 | 11.35 | Colin Blythe | Kent |
| 118 | 16.00 | George Dennett | Gloucestershire |
| 112 | 17.26 | Alec Kennedy | Hampshire |
| 109 | 13.14 | Harry Dean | Lancashire |
| 106 | 14.59 | George Thompson | Northamptonshire |
