= Arthur Marsden =

Arthur Marsden may refer to:

- Arthur Marsden (cricketer) (1880–1916), English cricketer who played first-class cricket for Derbyshire in 1910
- Arthur Marsden (politician) (1883–1960), British Conservative Party politician, Member of Parliament, 1931–1935 and 1937–1950
- John Marsden (rower) (Arthur John Marsden, 1915–2004), English rower
