= Albert Blount =

English cricketer

Personal information
- Full name: Albert Blount
- Born: 8 August 1889; Morton, Derbyshire, England
- Died: 10 November 1961 (aged 72); New Rossington, Yorkshire, England
- Batting: Right-handed
- Bowling: Left-arm slow orthodox

Domestic team information
- Years: Team
- 1912–1926: Derbyshire
- First-class debut: 4 May 1912 Derbyshire v South Africans
- Last First-class: 26 May 1926 Derbyshire v Northamptonshire

Career statistics
Competition	First-class
Matches	7
Runs scored	52
Batting average	5.77
100s/50s	0/0
Top score	17
Balls bowled	508
Wickets	7
Bowling average	30.71
5 wickets in innings	0
10 wickets in match	0
Best bowling	4/53
Catches/stumpings	3/–
- Source: CricketArchive, 1 February 2012

Albert Blount (8 August 1889 – 10 November 1961) was an English cricketer who played first-class cricket for Derbyshire in 1912 and 1926.

Blount was born in Morton, Derbyshire. He made his debut for Derbyshire in the 1912 season, in May against the South Africans, when he took a wicket and was twice not out. He played a total of five matches by the middle of June, and had his best bowling performance of 4 for 53 against Sussex . After a 14-year gap, he reappeared for Derbyshire in the 1926 season, and played two matches that year, scoring his personal best of 17 in his last game which was against Northamptonshire.

Blount was a right-hand batsman and played 11 innings in 7 first-class matches with an average of 5.77 and a top score of 17. He was a slow left-arm orthodox bowler and took 7 first-class wickets at an average of 30.71 and a best performance of 4 for 53.

Blount died at New Rossington, Yorkshire at the age of 72.
