= Listed buildings in Dunford =

Dunford is a civil parish in the metropolitan borough of Barnsley, South Yorkshire, England. The parish contains 23 listed buildings that are recorded in the National Heritage List for England. All the listed buildings are designated at Grade II, the lowest of the three grades, which is applied to "buildings of national importance and special interest". The parish is almost completely rural, containing only small settlements, including Carlecotes. Most of the listed buildings are farmhouses, farm buildings, and houses. The other listed buildings are a church, animal shelters, a boundary stone, a wayside cross, and milestones.

== Buildings ==
Name and location	Photograph	Date	Notes
Barns at Small Shaw Farm; 53.53282°N 1.68991°W	—	1632	Two barns at right angles, the later one dated 1687, in stone with stone slate roofs. Both barns have a single aisle, the earlier barn has four internal bays, and both have various openings. The date of the earlier barn is on a projecting stone, and the later barn has a central doorway with a quoined surround, and a dated and initialled Tudor arched lintel.
Dick Royd Farmhouse and barn 53.52335°N 1.73975°W	—	17th century	The oldest part is the cross-wing, with the main range dated 1741. The house is in stone, the cross-wing rendered, with quoins, and a stone slate roof. There are two storeys, the main range has three bays, with the cross-wing on the left, projecting on the front and recessed at the rear, and the barn on the right. Most of the windows are chamfered and have mullions. The barn contains two chamfered entrances.
Lower Small Shaw Farmhouse; 53.53288°N 1.68946°W	—	17th century	The farmhouse, which was extended in the 19th and 20th centuries, is in stone on a chamfered plinth, and has a stone slate roof with chamfered gable copings on shaped kneelers. There are two storeys, three bays, and a later rear wing. The doorway has a moulded surround and a cambered head. Most of the windows are mullioned, and in the earlier part are two cross windows with hood moulds. In the right gable end is a mullioned and transomed window with a hood mould in each floor, and an apex finial.
Carlecotes Hall; 53.52650°N 1.73235°W	—	Late 17th century	A large house that has been altered and extended, it is in stone with stone slate roofs and a gable with chamfered copings on moulded kneelers. There are two storeys and a Z-shaped plan consisting of three parallel east–west ranges, the southern two of which end in a north–south range. Most of the windows are mullioned and transomed. On the south range is a two-storey canted bay window, and in an angle is a two-storey square bay window, with cambered heads on the ground floor lights, and trefoiled heads on the upper floor, both with an embattled parapet.
Barn adjoining The Green; 53.52639°N 1.73350°W	—	1662	The barn is in stone, with quoins, a stone slate roof, and three internal bays. On the front is a square-headed cart entry with a quoined surround, and two quoined entrances, one with a dated lintel. At the rear is a similar cart entry, and in the right return are vents and a dovecote in the gable apex.
Lower Maythorn Farmhouse; 53.54669°N 1.71904°W	—	Late 17th century	The farmhouse, which was extended in the 19th and 20th centuries, is in stone, and has a stone slate roof with moulded gable copings on moulded kneelers, and an ornamental finial. There are two storeys and an L-shaped plan. The windows in the older part are chamfered with mullions and hood moulds.
Barn at Lower Maythorn Farm; 53.54672°N 1.71856°W		Late 17th century	A stone barn with quoins, and a stone slate roof with gable coping and moulded kneelers on the right. There are five internal bays, an aisle on the front, and a smaller aisle at the rear. In the centre of the front is a square-headed cart entry with a chamfered surround, two Tudor arched entrances, and small chamfered vents.
Barn at Hepshaw Farm; 53.54205°N 1.73513°W	—	1697	The barn is in stone, with quoins, and a stone slate roof with chamfered gable copings on moulded kneelers. There are five internal bays, and a continuous outshut on the front. The barn contains an entrance with a chamfered surround and a dated Tudor arched lintel, and at the rear are two square-headed cart entries.
Barn, Upper Town Head Farm; 53.52158°N 1.75322°W	—	Late 17th or early 18th century	The barn is in stone, with quoins, and a stone slate roof with gable copings on moulded kneelers on the left. There are four internal bays, and a continuous rear outshut. In the centre of the front is a segmental-arched cart entry with a quoined surround, and square pitching holes. At the rear is a cart entry and two quoined entrances.
Milestone, Old Salt Road; 53.49575°N 1.77293°W		Late 18th or early 19th century (probable)	The milestone by the Old Salt Road is in millstone grit. It consists of a post with a rounded top, and is inscribed with the Roman numerals "XX", the distance to Rotherham.
Upper Wood Royd Farmhouse; 53.54825°N 1.72832°W	—	1806	A stone farmhouse, partly rendered, with a stone slate roof and coped gables on cut kneelers. There are two storeys and two bays. The central doorway has a quoined surround, above which is an ornamental initialled and dated plaque. There is one sash window, and the other windows are mullioned.
Milestone east of junction with Windleden Lane; 53.49795°N 1.77487°W		Early 19th century	The milestone is on the south side of Woodhead Road (A628 road). It consists of an upright stone with a rounded top, inscribed with the distances to Barnsley and Manchester.
Small Shaw Farmhouse; 53.53290°N 1.68964°W	—	Early 19th century	The farmhouse is in stone on a chamfered plinth, with a floor band, and a stone slate roof with chamfered gable copings on moulded kneelers. There are two storeys and an L-shaped plan, with a symmetrical front of three bays, and a rear lean-to. In the centre of the front is a chamfered doorway, and the windows are mullioned, some with hood moulds.
Hazlehead Hall; 53.52474°N 1.69683°W		Mid 19th century	A large stone house with Welsh slate roof, two storeys, and an H-shaped plan. Most of the windows are sashes. The garden front has a gabled bay on the left containing a two-storey canted bay window and a small round-arched window above. The right bay is also gabled, and this bay and the part between contain French windows. At the rear is a central doorway, and single-storey wings extend from the gable ends. The left return has four bays, and contains a two-storey square porch with a round-headed doorway and windows, and an embattled parapet.
St Anne's Church; 53.52625°N 1.73231°W		1856–57	The church is in the grounds of Carlecotes Hall, and was designed by George Shaw. It is in stone with a tile roof, and consists of a nave, a south porch, a chancel and a north vestry. Between the bays are diagonal buttresses.
Boundary Stone; 53.55994°N 1.72319°W	—	Mid to late 19th century	The ward boundary stone is by a crossroads. It consists of a triangular stone post inscribed "FULSTONE" and "SCHOLES".
Cattle shelter 53.52811°N 1.69967°W	—	Mid to late 19th century	The cattle shelter, later used for other purposes, is in stone with a pyramidal Welsh slate roof. It has a square plan with diagonal walls radiating from a small square central chamber. Two monolithic stone posts on each side support the eaves of the roof.
Sheep shelter 53.51734°N 1.71032°W	—	Mid to late 19th century	The sheep shelter is in stone with a pyramidal Welsh slate roof. It has a square plan with diagonal walls radiating from a small square central chamber. Two brick piers on each side support the eaves of the roof.
Milestone near Bents Road; 53.52724°N 1.70908°W		Late 19th century	The milestone is on the west side of the A616 road, south of its junction with Bents Road. It is in stone with cast iron overlay, and has a rounded top. It formerly had a triangular plan, but the front is damaged. On the top is inscribed "NEW MILL DISTRICT ROAD" and "THURLSTONE". The lower part had the distances to Huddersfield, Sheffield, and Holmfirth.
Milestone north of Prince of Wales Public House; 53.53880°N 1.72238°W		Late 19th century	The milestone is on the southwest side of Whams Road (A616 road). It is in stone with cast iron overlay, and has a triangular plan and a rounded top. On the top is inscribed "NEW MILL DISTRICT ROAD" and "HEPWORTH", and on the sides are the distances to Huddersfield and Sheffield.
Milestone near Bare Bones Road; 53.53496°N 1.77570°W		Late 19th century	The milestone is on the west side of Dunford Road near its junction with Bare Bones Road. It is in stone with cast iron overlay, and has a triangular plan and a rounded top. On the top is inscribed "DUNFORD ROAD" and "CARTWORTH", and on the sides are the distances to Huddersfield, Dunford Bridge and Holmfirth.
Barn at Softley Farm; 53.52300°N 1.72032°W	—	1870s or 1880s	The barn is in stone with oversailing eaves and a stone slate roof. There are fronts of three and two bays, and a further bay at the rear. On the front are giant round-arched openings, with square piers, and two orders of voussoirs on imposts.
Catshaw Cross; 53.52777°N 1.69046°W		Uncertain	The cross was placed in its present site in a dry wall enclosure on the south side of Lee Lane (B6106 road) in about 1980. It consists of a square post in millstone grit with chamfered sides and a rounded top.
