= Eric Murray =

Eric Murray may refer to:

- Eric Murray (bridge) (1928–2018), Canadian bridge player
- Eric Murray (cricketer) (1883–1971), South African cricketer
- Eric Murray (footballer) (1941–2016), Scottish footballer (Kilmarnock FC)
- Eric Murray (rower) (born 1982), New Zealand rower
- Eric Murray (American football) (born 1994), American football cornerback
