= Lemuel Smith (cricketer) =

English cricketer

Personal information
- Full name: Lemuel Strutt Tugby Smith
- Born: 5 June 1880; Tibshelf, Derbyshire, England
- Died: 30 December 1927 (aged 47); South Kirkby, Yorkshire, England
- Batting: Right-handed

Domestic team information
- Years: Team
- 1909: Derbyshire
- FC debut: 3 May 1909 Derbyshire v Yorkshire
- Last FC: 10 May 1909 Derbyshire v Sussex

Career statistics
Competition	First-class
Matches	2
Runs scored	9
Batting average	3.00
100s/50s	0/0
Top score	5
Catches/stumpings	1/–
- Source: CricketArchive, October 2012

Lemuel Strutt Tugby Smith (5 June 1880 – 30 December 1927) was an English cricketer who played for Derbyshire in 1909.

Smith was born in Tibshelf, Derbyshire. He made his debut for Derbyshire in the 1909 season in a match against Yorkshire in May, in which Smith scored a few runs and took a single catch. His next and last first-class game followed a week later, in a draw against Sussex.

Smith was a right-handed batsman and played three innings in two first-class matches, making a total of 9 runs.

Smith died in South Kirkby, Yorkshire at the age of 47.
