= Stanley Dickinson =

English cricketer

Personal information
- Full name: Stanley Patrick Dickinson
- Born: 7 March 1890; Norton, Derbyshire, England
- Died: 25 June 1972 (aged 82); Criccieth, Caernarvonshire, Wales
- Batting: Right-handed
- Bowling: Right-arm medium-fast

Domestic team information
- Years: Team
- 1909: Derbyshire
- FC debut: 3 May 1909 Derbyshire v Yorkshire
- Last FC: 15 May 1909 Derbyshire v Warwickshire

Career statistics
Competition	First-class
Matches	2
Runs scored	13
Batting average	6.50
100s/50s	0/0
Top score	10*
Balls bowled	78
Wickets	1
Bowling average	45.00
5 wickets in innings	0
10 wickets in match	0
Best bowling	1/38
Catches/stumpings	0/–
- Source: CricketArchive, October 2012

Stanley Patrick Dickinson (7 March 1890 — 25 June 1972) was an English cricketer who played for Derbyshire in 1909.

Dickinson was born in Norton, Derbyshire and educated at Haileybury College where he was in the cricket XI in 1906 and 1907. He made two appearances for Derbyshire during the 1909 season, his first coming in an innings defeat at the hands of Yorkshire and his second in a draw against Warwickshire.

Dickinson was a right-handed batsman and scored 13 runs overall. He was a right-arm medium-fast bowler and took one wicket.

Dickinson died at Dolbenmaen, near Criccieth, Caernarvonshire at the age of 82.
