= William Thompson (cricketer, born 1882) =

English cricketer

Personal information
- Full name: William Holloway Thompson
- Born: 24 June 1882; Spondon. Derbyshire, England
- Died: 19 October 1954 (aged 72); Spondon, Derbyshire, England
- Batting: Right-handed

Domestic team information
- Years: Team
- 1908: Derbyshire
- Only FC: 20 July 1908 Derbyshire v Leicestershire

Career statistics
Competition	First-class
Matches	1
Runs scored	17
Batting average	8.50
100s/50s	0/0
Top score	17
Catches/stumpings	0/–
- Source: CricketArchive, July 2012

William Holloway Thompson (24 June 1882 – 19 October 1954) was an English cricketer who played first-class cricket for Derbyshire in 1908.

Thompson was born in Spondon, Derbyshire. He played one game for Derbyshire in the 1908 season, against Leicestershire in July at Derby. He scored 17 runs in the first innings, but was out for a duck in the second. He was a right-handed batsman.

Thompson died 19 October 1954 at Spondon at the age of 72.
