= Herbert Bowmer =

English cricketer

Personal information
- Full name: Herbert Edgar Bowmer
- Born: 4 July 1891; Wirksworth, Derbyshire, England
- Died: 1 May 1966 (aged 74); Derby, England
- Batting: Right-handed
- Bowling: Right arm medium-fast

Domestic team information
- Years: Team
- 1909–1911: Derbyshire
- FC debut: 2 August 1909 Derbyshire v Essex
- Last FC: 26 June 1911 Derbyshire v Hampshire

Career statistics
Competition	First-class
Matches	3
Runs scored	6
Batting average	1.00
100s/50s	0/0
Top score	3
Catches/stumpings	1/–
- Source: CricketArchive, October 2012

Herbert Edgar Bowmer (4 July 1891 – 1 June 1966) was an English cricketer who played for Derbyshire between 1909 and 1911.

Bowmer was born in Wirksworth, Derbyshire and was educated at Wellingborough Grammar School where he was in the first eleven for cricket from 1907 to 1909. He played two matches for Derbyshire during the 1909 season - debuting against Essex and following up with a match against Northamptonshire. In both matches he was out for a duck in the first innings and made low single figure scores in the second. Bowmer reappeared in the 1911 season for one match against Hampshire in which his performance was little changed from previously. He played once for Derbyshire second XI in 1913.

Bowmer was a right-handed batsman and played six innings in three first-class matches and made a total of six runs in them. He was a right-arm medium-fast bowler but did not bowl in first-class cricket.

Bowmer died at the age of 75 in Derby.
