= Charles Nornable =

English cricketer (1886–1970)

Personal information
- Full name: Charles Ernest Nornable
- Born: 25 December 1886; Norton, Derbyshire, England
- Died: 21 April 1970 (aged 83); Sheffield, England
- Batting: Right-handed
- Bowling: Right-arm fast-medium

Domestic team information
- Years: Team
- 1909: Derbyshire
- Only FC: 10 May 1909 Derbyshire v Sussex

Career statistics
Competition	First-class
Matches	1
Runs scored	8
Batting average	8.00
100s/50s	0/0
Top score	8
Balls bowled	127
Wickets	5
Bowling average	14.40
5 wickets in innings	0
10 wickets in match	0
Best bowling	3/24
Catches/stumpings	0/–
- Source: CricketArchive, October 2012

Charles Ernest Nornable (25 December 1886 – 21 April 1970) was an English cricketer who played for Derbyshire in 1909.

Nornable was born in Norton, in Derbyshire.

Nornable played just one game for the Derbyshire team in the 1909 season which was against Sussex in May. Demands of his business prevented him from playing further games for Derbyshire. He was a right-arm medium-fast bowler, and in the first innings, he took three wickets, including that of Test cricketer Harry Butt. In the second innings he took two more wickets. He was a right-handed batsman and scored 8 runs.

Nornable died in hospital in Sheffield at the age of 83. His son Gordon Nornable was decorated for underground service with the French resistance during World War II.
