= John Eyre (cricketer, born 1885) =

English cricketer

Personal information
- Full name: John Arthur Eyre
- Born: 25 July 1885; North Wingfield, England
- Died: 12 June 1964 (aged 78); Bolton-on-Dearne, England
- Batting: Right-handed

Domestic team information
- Years: Team
- 1908: Derbyshire
- Only FC: 17 August 1908 Derbyshire v Gentlemen of Philadelphia

Career statistics
Competition	First-class
Matches	1
Runs scored	2
Batting average	2.00
100s/50s	0/0
Top score	1*
Catches/stumpings	0/–
- Source: CricketArchive, July 2012

John Arthur Eyre (25 July 1885 – 12 June 1964) was an English cricketer who played first-class cricket for Derbyshire in 1908.

Eyre was born in North Wingfield, the son of Frederick Eyre, a coal miner. His father played a single game for Derbyshire in the 1892 season.

Eyre appeared in a single first-class fixture for Derbyshire in the 1908 season, against the Gentlemen of Philadelphia. Eyre was a right-handed middle-lower order batsman and scored one run in each innings.

Eyre died in Bolton-on-Dearne.
