= George Grainger (cricketer) =

English cricketer

Personal information
- Full name: George Grainger
- Born: 11 January 1887; Morton, Derbyshire, England
- Died: 17 August 1977 (aged 90); Walton, Derbyshire, England
- Batting: Left-handed
- Bowling: Left-arm slow-medium

Domestic team information
- Years: Team
- 1909–1921: Derbyshire
- FC debut: 23 August 1909 Derbyshire v Lancashire
- Last FC: 15 June 1921 Derbyshire v Gloucestershire

Career statistics
Competition	First-class
Matches	5
Runs scored	36
Batting average	6.00
100s/50s	0/0
Top score	10*
Balls bowled	756
Wickets	7
Bowling average	49.71
5 wickets in innings	0
10 wickets in match	0
Best bowling	4/91
Catches/stumpings	1/–
- Source: CricketArchive, July 2012

George Grainger (11 November 1887 — 17 August 1977) was an English cricketer who played first-class cricket for Derbyshire between 1909 and 1921.

Grainger was born in Morton, Derbyshire. He began his cricket career for Derbyshire in the 1909 season, making his debut against Lancashire. He was moved up the batting order for the first innings in his next game but did not capitalise on it. He played just one match during the 1910 season, but did not play another game for eleven years.

Grainger made his return in the first half of the 1921 season, at the age of 34 and took 4–91 bowling against Somerset. He played one more match in a season when Derbyshire finished in twelfth place in the County Championship.

He was a left-handed batsman who played 9 innings in 5 first-class games with a top score of 10 and an average of 6.0. He was a left-arm slow-medium bowler and took 7 wickets with an average of 49.71.

Grainger died in Walton, Derbyshire aged 89.
