= Peter Higson =

English cricketer (1905–1986)

Personal information
- Born: 1 December 1905; Bramhall, Cheshire, England
- Died: 19 April 1986 (aged 80); Hove, Sussex, England
- Batting: Right-handed
- Relatives: Thomas Higson, Sr. (father); Thomas Higson, Jr. (brother)

Domestic team information
- Years: Team
- 1928–1931: Lancashire
- 1933: Minor Counties

Career statistics
| Competition | First-class |
|---|---|
| Matches | 4 |
| Runs scored | 51 |
| Batting average | 25.50 |
| 100s/50s | 0/0 |
| Top score | 29 |
| Balls bowled | 54 |
| Wickets | 0 |
| Bowling average | – |
| 5 wickets in innings | – |
| 10 wickets in match | – |
| Best bowling | – |
| Catches/stumpings | 2/– |
- Source: Cricinfo, 29 March 2014

Peter Higson (1 December 1905 – 19 April 1986) was an English cricketer active in the late nineteen-twenties and early nineteen-thirties. Born at Bramhall, Cheshire and educated at Cheltenham College, Higson was a right-handed batsman who played first-class cricket for Lancashire.

Higson made his first-class debut for Lancashire in 1928 after playing five seasons for the Lancashire Second XI in the Minor Counties Championship. His first-class debut was against Sussex at Old Trafford in the County Championship. He played two further first-class matches for Lancashire, against Warwickshire in 1929 and Somerset in 1931, though his appearances for Lancashire remained predominantly for the Second XI in the Minor Counties Championship. He was selected to play a combined Minor Counties team in a first-class fixture against Oxford University in 1933, his final appearance in first-class cricket. Higson scored a total of 51 runs in his four first-class matches, top-scoring with 29.

Following his playing career, Higson was the President of Lancashire County Cricket Club in 1973 and 1974. He died at Hove, Sussex on 19 April 1986. His father Thomas Higson was a first-class cricketer, as was his brother, also Thomas.
