= Kenneth Woodward (cricketer) =

English cricketer

Kenneth Alexander Woodward (23 December 1874 – 24 December 1950) was an English cricketer who played first-class cricket for Oxford University in 1896 and for Derbyshire in 1909.

Woodward was born at Sefton Park, Liverpool, the son of Ernest T. Woodward, a corn merchant and his wife Anita. In 1881 the family were living at Toxteth Park. He was educated at Harrow School where he was a member of the Harrow XI in 1892 and 1893 and from 1893, he also played for Herefordshire. He went to University College, Oxford and played one match for Oxford University in 1896 against Marylebone Cricket Club (MCC), but did not gain a Blue. He subsequently played occasional games for Herefordshire. In the 1909 season he played two matches in August for Derbyshire. Against Lancashire he scored one and seven and against Northamptonshire scored a duck and was not out on four.

Woodward was a right-hand batsman and played six innings in three first-class matches with an average of 4.60 and a top score of seven. He was a right-arm medium pace bowler, but did not bowl in the first-class game.

During World War I, Woodward served in the Royal Marine Engineers.

Woodward died at Charlton Kings, Gloucestershire, aged 76.
