= Winscar Reservoir =

Reservoir in South Yorkshire, England

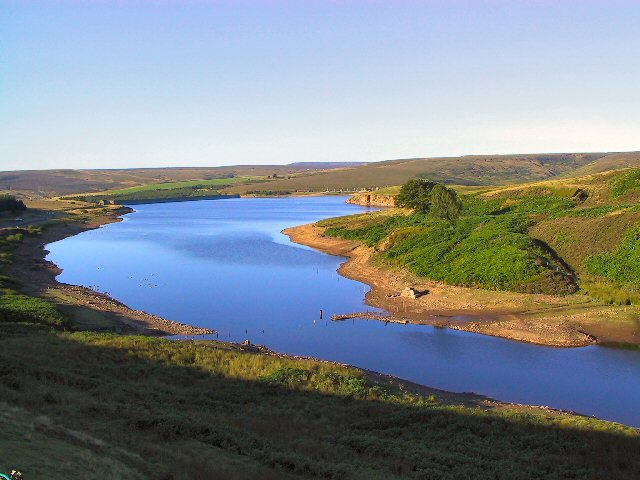
- Winscar Reservoir

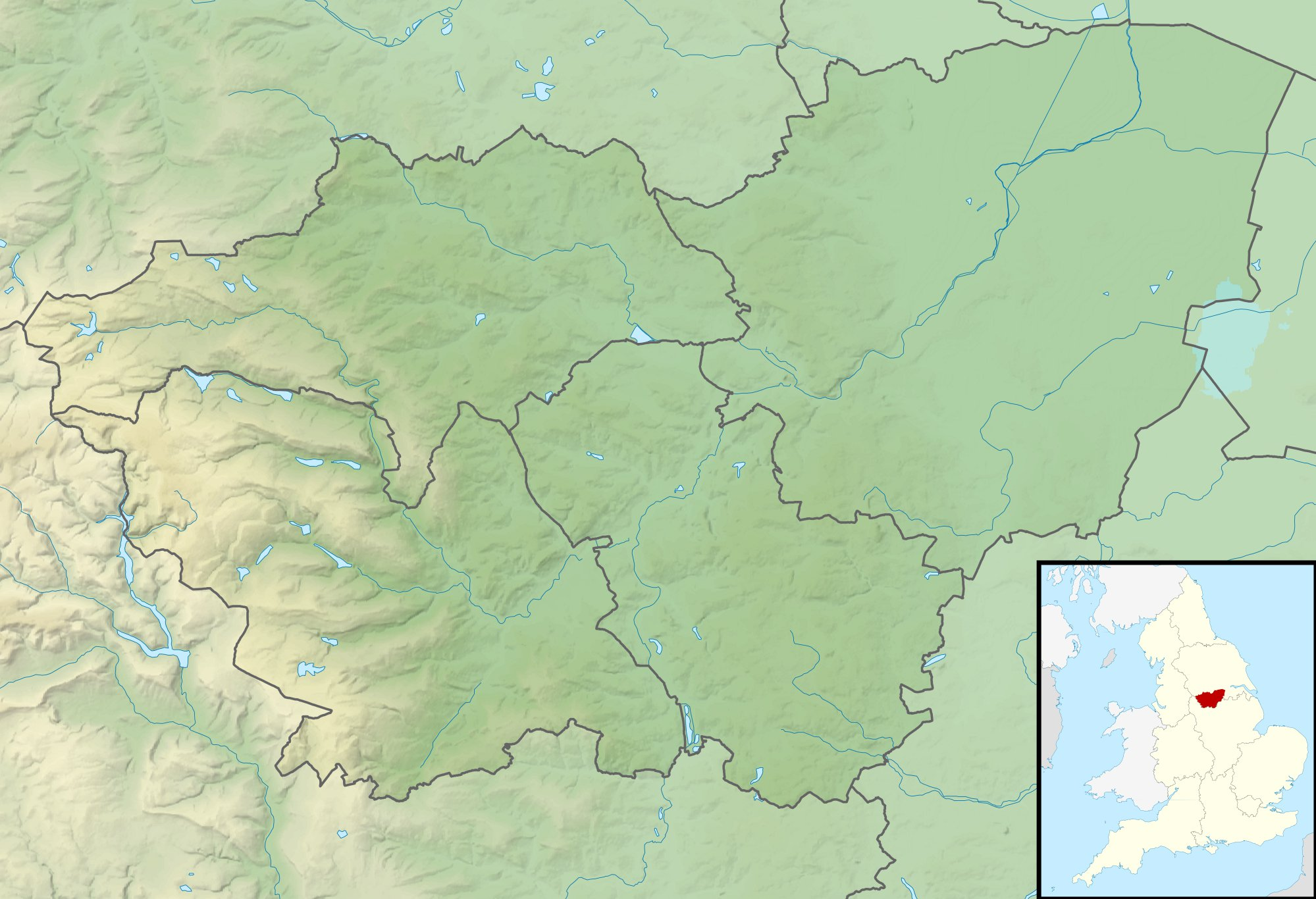
- Location within South Yorkshire
- Location: Dunford Bridge, South Yorkshire, England
- Coordinates: 53.5208°N 1.7741°W
- Type: Reservoir
- Etymology: Winscar Hales
- River sources: River Don
- Catchment area: 2,040 acres (825 ha)
- Managing agency: Yorkshire Water
- Built: 1972–1975
- First flooded: 1975–1982
- Surface area: 130 acres (51 ha)
- Average depth: 58 feet (17.8 m)
- Max. depth: 137 feet (41.8 m)
- Water volume: 323,807,000 cubic feet (9,169,194 m^{3})
- Shore length^{1}: 3.1 miles (5 km)
- Surface elevation: 1,135 feet (346 m)
- ^{1} Shore length is not a well-defined measure.

Winscar Reservoir (also known as Winscar dam), is a compensation reservoir on the headwaters of the River Don in South Yorkshire, England. The reservoir is located at Dunford Bridge in Barnsley 25 miles (40 km) northwest of Sheffield, and is just inside the Peak District National Park on the Pennine watershed. The reservoir was built on an existing dam and has suffered from leaking which necessitated a new membrane being installed at the dam head in the years 2000 and 2001.

It was the first major dam to be built in England with an asphaltic concrete membrane on the upstream dam wall and was the last dam to be built that was fed from the River Don.

== History ==
Dunford Bridge Dam was built in the 1850s and was used to supply water not only for the River Don, but also to towns in the Spen Valley. The height of Dunford Bridge dam was 1,100 feet (340 m), some 35 feet (11 m) lower than the present Winscar Reservoir. An iron and brick conduit was used to convey the water the 18 miles (29 km) to a processing works at Heckmondwike. The dam was completed in the summer of 1857 when it was registered as having a dam wall 90 feet (27 m) deep and 350 feet (110 m) wide.

Winscar Reservoir was built in place of Dunford Bridge Dam, and all of it was subsumed into the enlarged reservoir in the valley. Mapping printed from before the construction of Winscar shows Dunford Bridge Dam to have a dam wall facing due east, mapping from post-1975 shows Winscar Reservoirs' dam wall to be facing southeast, having been moved eastwards and a greater portion of land around Harden Dike stream to have been flooded. Plans for a larger reservoir at Dunford Bridge were submitted in the early 1970s as it was deemed necessary to store more water in fear of shortages in places such as Halifax and Brighouse. At the time of authorisation, the water company involved was the Mid Calder Water Board, who would go on with several others to be the constituent companies in the formation of Yorkshire Water.

The name Winscar applies to the high ground on the east bank of Harden Dike as it flows out of Harden Reservoir. Winscar was also the site of former quarry workings and the Scar suffix is typical of describing rough layers of rock projecting through the surface. Winscar is fed by Dearden Clough from the southwest, the nascent River Don from the east and from Harden Reservoir via Harden Dike to the north.

Winscar is one of 25 reservoirs along the course of the River Don and was the last to be built, being completed in 1975. As Yorkshire Water was founded by the constituent companies in 1974, it also remains the only reservoir on the Don to have been built under the tenure of Yorkshire Water. The reservoir was also the first major dam in England to be built with a membrane on the dam wall constructed from asphaltic concrete. When construction was completed in 1975, impounding of water began, but it took until 1982 for the water to completely fill the reservoir. Likewise, when the water has been drained from the reservoir, the water takes on average two years to fully restock to previous water levels. This is down to the catchment being low on supply rather than the size of the reservoir itself. A wide pool (known as jump pool or a stilling pool) was built at the bottom of the culvert downstream of the dam head. This dissolves the kinetic energy from the water travelling through the downhill culvert.

The Upper Don River was subject to severe siltation when the construction of Winscar was underway. This had an adverse effect on the spawning fish grounds in the upper catchment, which necessitated the release of water in flushes to disperse the silted riverbed. The height of the dam head is 174 feet (53 m) and the dam head extends for a width of 1,710 feet (520 m). The centre of the dam head is compacted rock and layered over with asphaltic concrete that covers over 270,000 square feet (25,000 m^{2}). The use of rock allowed for very steep walls on both sides of the dam head, which in turn meant that the water level could be significantly higher and the new dam head could be built between the old dam and the village of Dunford Bridge.

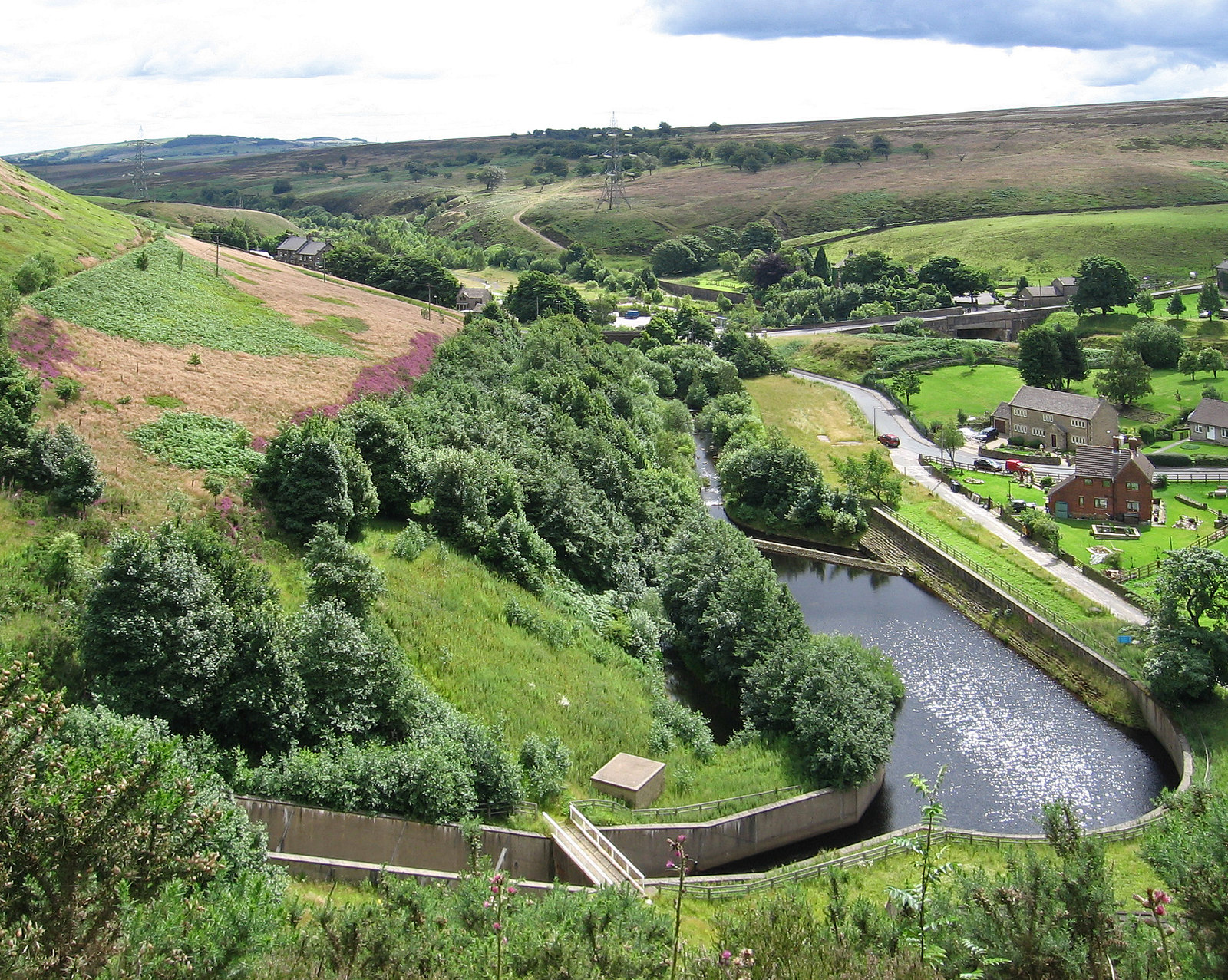
The stilling pool at the bottom of the reservoir

In 2001, the water seeping from the reservoir through a crack had drained so much water from Winscar, that the entire reservoir was drained to enable engineers to find the source of the leak. Many smaller leaks had developed between 1975 and 2001, some relatively small, and initially, many of these were due to the settlement of rocks being at a different rate of stabilisation to the culverts and other grouted areas. In doing so, the old Dunford Bridge Dam, was partially recommissioned as it lay upstream from the Winscar Reservoir head, and this allowed the water to settle before being released through Winscar whilst remedial work was taking place. The leak was located 65 feet (20 m) below the normal water level, and was responsible for the loss of between 140,000 cubic feet (4,000 m^{3}) and 210,000 cubic feet (6,000 m^{3}) of water per day.

A PVC geomembrane was suggested to cover the embankment and cover the holes and cracks. As PVC had not been used in this type of application before, there was some concern about chemicals leaching out of the PVC and into the water supply. The work was complete by March 2002 and the reservoir was allowed to restock back to normal levels.

Immediately downstream of the reservoir is Dunford Bridge gauging station, which is part of the maintained flow from the reservoir to keep water in the River Don. Yorkshire Water is expected to allow over 2,000,000 imperial gallons (9,100,000 L; 2,400,000 US gal) of water to pass through the gauging station per day, with limitations down by 50% in times of drought. Winscar Reservoir is also permitted to compensate the River Calder when necessary. Whilst the chemical composition of the water is good, the ecological and overall condition of the water is classified as bad by the Environment Agency.

== Recreation and other uses ==
Pennine Sailing Club use the reservoir recreationally. The club have achieved Royal Yachting Association status. The dam head is furnished with a road that can be used for walking and is also on National Cycle Route 68, with National Cycle Route 62 and the Trans Pennine Trail just to the south. The dam head is also on the route of the Yorkshire Water Way. The Peak District Boundary Walk runs along the east side of the reservoir.

Emergency services also use Winscar Reservoir to practise for water rescues and possible major events with mass casualties.
