= Albert Howcroft =

English cricketer

Personal information
- Born: 27 December 1882; Cliffe, Yorkshire, England
- Died: 7 March 1955 (aged 72); Belper, Derbyshire, England
- Batting: Left-handed

Domestic team information
- Years: Team
- 1908–1910: Derbyshire
- FC debut: 11 May 1908 Derbyshire v Surrey
- Last FC: 11 July 1910 Derbyshire v Leicestershire

Career statistics
Competition	First-class
Matches	4
Runs scored	46
Batting average	5.75
100s/50s	0/0
Top score	19
Catches/stumpings	2/–
- Source: CricketArchive, 1 January 2012

Albert Howcroft (27 December 1882 – 7 March 1955) was an English cricketer who played for Derbyshire in 1908 and 1910.

Howcroft was born in Cliffe, Yorkshire. He made his debut for Derbyshire in the 1908 season, in May against Surrey, when he scored 19 during the second innings, having been caught out in the first. His second appearance came a week later against Sussex, but he made little impact. He next played for Derbyshire in the 1910 season, playing two games. His final first-class game was against Leicestershire when Ernest Needham and Leonard Oliver both scored first-innings centuries for a Derbyshire victory. Howcroft was a left-handed lower-order batsman and played 8 innings in four first-class matches. His best score was his debut 19 and his average 5.75.

Howcroft died at Belper, Derbyshire at the age of 73.
