= Charles Newcombe =

English sportsman

Personal information
- Full name: Charles Neil Newcombe
- Born: 16 March 1891; Great Yarmouth, Norfolk, England
- Died: 27 December 1915 (aged 24); Fleurbaix, France
- Batting: Right-handed
- Bowling: Left-arm medium-slow

Domestic team information
- Years: Team
- 1910: Derbyshire
- Only FC: 26 May 1910 Derbyshire v Yorkshire

Career statistics
Competition	First-class
Matches	1
Runs scored	1
Batting average	0.50
100s/50s	0/0
Top score	1
Balls bowled	72
Wickets	0
Bowling average	–
5 wickets in innings	–
10 wickets in match	–
Best bowling	–
Catches/stumpings	0/–
- Source: CricketArchive, November 2012

Charles Neil Newcombe (16 March 1891 – 27 December 1915) was an English cricketer and footballer who played first-class cricket for Derbyshire in 1910 and played for a number of football clubs, including Glossop, Chesterfield Town, Manchester United and Rotherham Town. He was killed in action in the First World War.

== Early life ==
Newcombe was born in Great Yarmouth, the son of E. Percy G. Newcombe and Helen Ada L. Newcombe, later of Matlock. He was educated at Chesterfield School, where he was head boy.

== Cricket career ==
Newcombe made a single first-class appearance for Derbyshire in the 1910 season against Yorkshire in May, when he hit wicket after 1 run in the first innings and was bowled out for a duck by Drake in the second. He was a right-handed batsman and a left-arm slow-medium bowler although he never bowled a first-class ball.

== Football career ==
Newcombe began his football career at Sheepbridge Works before joining Creswell. He moved to Chesterfield Town ahead of the 1910/11 season and spent the following season there before moving to Rotherham Town. After a brief spell at Manchester United, he made two Football League appearances for Glossop during the 1913/14 season, before finishing his career at Tibshelf Colliery.

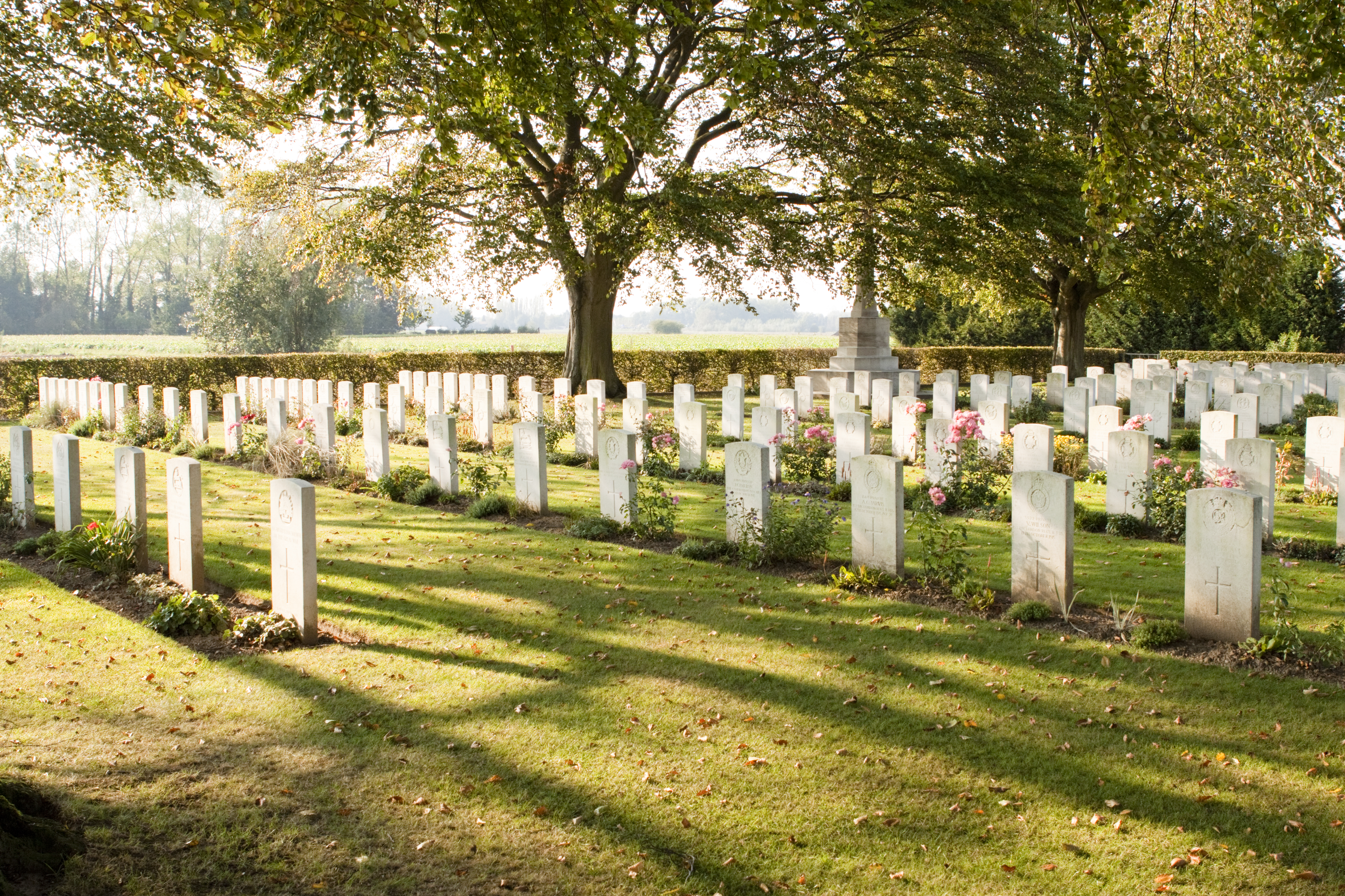
Y Farm Military Cemetery

== First World War ==
Newcombe served in the First World War with the 7th (Service Battalion of the King's Own Yorkshire Light Infantry as a lieutenant and was killed in action at Fleurbaix in France. He was buried at Y Farm Military Cemetery, Bois-Grenier.
