= George Burnham (cricketer) =

English cricketer

Personal information
- Full name: George Joseph Burnham
- Born: 5 November 1878; Nottingham, England
- Died: 7 March 1971 (aged 92); Nottingham, England
- Batting: Right-handed

Domestic team information
- Years: Team
- 1912: Derbyshire
- FC debut: 13 May 1912 Derbyshire v Warwickshire
- Last FC: 24 June 1912 Derbyshire v Warwickshire

Career statistics
| Competition | First-class |
|---|---|
| Matches | 5 |
| Runs scored | 30 |
| Batting average | 6.00 |
| 100s/50s | 0/0 |
| Top score | 15 |
| Catches/stumpings | 3/– |
- Source: CricketArchive, February 2011

George Joseph Burnham (5 November 1878 – 7 March 1971) was an English cricketer who played first-class cricket for Derbyshire in 1912.

Burnham was born in Nottingham, the son of Jesse Burnham, a millwright, and his wife Hannah. He played his only first-class matches for Derbyshire in the 1912 season. He made his debut against Warwickshire in May 1912 when he was not out for 10 in the second innings. Over the next six weeks, he played four more matches, most of which were abandoned as draws, and that was the limit of his career. Burnham played six innings in five first-class matches with an average of 6.00 and a top score of 15.

Burnam acted as scorer in a few minor counties matches in the 1950s. He died at Nottingham at the age of 82.
