= Gordon Nornable =

British Army officer (1915–2002)

Gordon Nornable MC (9 January 1915 – 4 November 2002) won the Military Cross and Croix de Guerre in 1944 fighting with the French Maquis in eastern France.

== Biography ==
Nornable was born at Woodseats, Sheffield, the son of Charles Ernest Nornable. He was educated locally at King Edward VII School where he excelled at sport (his father had played cricket for Derbyshire).

In April 1940, he joined the London Scottish as a regimental police officer. In July 1942, he was drafted to the 6th Battalion, Gordon Highlanders, and volunteered to undertake commando missions for the Special Service in France. He was commissioned on the General List in March 1944, having previously been a sergeant. In June 1945, as a lieutenant, he transferred back to the Gordons. He was awarded the Military Cross in June 1945.

Apart from his military service, he was a local government officer with Sheffield Public Works Department from 1934 until he retired in 1975. In retirement, Nornable lived at Norton, Sheffield, where he died aged 87.
