= Stanley Holden (cricketer) =

English cricketer

Personal information
- Full name: Stanley Mitton Holden
- Born: 25 January 1886; Chesterfield, England
- Died: 10 May 1971 (aged 85); Coventry, England
- Batting: Right-handed
- Bowling: Left-arm medium-fast

Domestic team information
- Years: Team
- 1910–1920: Derbyshire
- FC debut: 1 August 1910 Derbyshire v Essex
- Last FC: 1 September 1920 Derbyshire v Somerset

Career statistics
| Competition | First-class |
|---|---|
| Matches | 4 |
| Runs scored | 13 |
| Batting average | 3.25 |
| 100s/50s | 0/0 |
| Top score | 6* |
| Balls bowled | 228 |
| Wickets | 3 |
| Bowling average | 37.00 |
| 5 wickets in innings | 0 |
| 10 wickets in match | 0 |
| Best bowling | 3/72 |
| Catches/stumpings | 1/– |
- Source: CricketArchive, November 2012

Stanley Mitton Holden (25 January 1886 – 10 May 1971) was an English cricketer who played first-class cricket for Derbyshire in 1910 and 1920.

Holden was born in Chesterfield, Derbyshire. He made his debut for Derbyshire in the 1910 season in August in a match against Essex. In that and the next match he had little opportunity to bowl and batted at the tail end. His third match that season was a wash-out. Holden next played for Derbyshire after the First World War in a single game in the 1920 season against Somerset. He took three wickets in that match and again batted at the tail end. Holden was a left-arm medium-fast bowler and took three wickets in his first-class career at an average of 37.00. He was a right-handed batsman and played 6 innings in 4 matches with a top score of 6 not out and an average of 3.25.

Holden died in Coventry at the age of 85.
