= Dunford =

Civil parish in South Yorkshire, England

Coordinates: 53.5245°N 1.7476°W

- Civil parish
- Location within South Yorkshire
- Population: 568 (2011 census)
- OS grid reference: SE166032
- Civil parish: Dunford
- Metropolitan borough: Barnsley
- Metropolitan county: South Yorkshire
- Region: Yorkshire and the Humber
- Country: England
- Sovereign state: United Kingdom
- Post town: SHEFFIELD
- Postcode district: S36
- Dialling code: 01226
- Police: South Yorkshire
- Fire: South Yorkshire
- Ambulance: Yorkshire
- UK Parliament: Penistone and Stocksbridge

Dunford is a civil parish in the Metropolitan Borough of Barnsley, in South Yorkshire, England. It lies in the Peak District and within the Metropolitan Borough of Barnsley. The population of the civil parish as of the 2011 census was 568. The parish is centred on Dunford Bridge to the west and Crow Edge to the east.

The parish includes several other villages and hamlets such as Carlecotes and Flouch. There are several important water sources in the parish, such as Broadstones, Harden, Snailsden, Winscar, and Upper and Lower Windleden Reservoirs, fed from the surrounding moorlands and managed by Yorkshire Water.

== History ==
The parish was formed in 1938 from parts of the urban districts of Holme, Newmill (Fulstone, Hepworth, Scholes) and Thurlstone.

Before the creation of the Metropolitan County of South Yorkshire in April 1974, the parish was part of the West Riding of Yorkshire. At the time of the 2001 census it had a population of 627.

Although the parish is within South Yorkshire some members of the parish council and the clerk to the council are residents of the adjoining parish of Holmfirth in West Yorkshire.

For well over a millennium, Dunford lay within the ancient Wapentake of Staincross, an area that almost corresponds with the borders of the modern day Barnsley Metropolitan Area.

== See also ==
- Listed buildings in Dunford
