= Samuel Langton =

English cricketer

Personal information
- Full name: Samuel Thomas Langton
- Born: 24 January 1886; Rotherham, Yorkshire, England
- Died: 10 July 1918 (aged 32); Doncaster, Yorkshire, England
- Batting: Right-handed

Domestic team information
- Years: Team
- 1909–1910: Derbyshire
- FC debut: 7 June 1909 Derbyshire v Leicestershire
- Last FC: 9 May 1910 Derbyshire v Sussex

Career statistics
Competition	First-class
Matches	3
Runs scored	14
Batting average	2.80
100s/50s	0/0
Top score	6
Balls bowled	78
Wickets	0
Bowling average	–
5 wickets in innings	–
10 wickets in match	–
Best bowling	–
Catches/stumpings	1/–
- Source: CricketArchive, October 2012

Samuel Thomas Langton (24 January 1886 – 10 July 1918) was an English cricketer who played first-class cricket for Derbyshire in 1909 and 1910.

Langton was born at Parkgate, Rotherham, Yorkshire. He made his debut for Derbyshire in the 1909 season in June in a match against Leicestershire and made one more appearance during the season, making little contribution to Derbyshire's run count during the season. He played one game in the 1910 season against Sussex when he made his top scoring innings of 6 runs. He was a right-handed batsman and played 5 innings in 3 matches with a top score of 6 and an average of 2.80. He bowled 13 overs giving 42 runs for no wickets.

Langton died at the age of 32 in Doncaster.
