= Thomas Higson (cricketer, born 1873) =

English cricketer (1873–1949)

Personal information
- Full name: Thomas Atkinson Higson
- Born: 19 November 1873; Stockport, Cheshire, England
- Died: 3 August 1949 (aged 75); Grange-over-Sands, England
- Batting: Right-handed
- Bowling: Right-arm off-break
- Relatives: Thomas Higson (son); Peter Higson (son)

Domestic team information
- Years: Team
- 1892: Oxford University
- 1899: Derbyshire
- 1905–1908: Lancashire
- 1909–1910: Derbyshire
- 1923: Lancashire
- FC debut: 20 June 1892 Oxford University v Lancashire
- Last FC: 27 June 1923 Lancashire v West Indies

Career statistics
Competition	First-class
Matches	29
Runs scored	584
Batting average	12.69
100s/50s	0/0
Top score	46
Balls bowled	2,537
Wickets	41
Bowling average	28.41
5 wickets in innings	0
10 wickets in match	0
Best bowling	4/74
Catches/stumpings	12/–
- Source: CricketArchive, November 2011

Thomas Atkinson Higson (19 November 1873 – 3 August 1949) was an English cricketer who played first-class cricket for Oxford University in 1892, for Derbyshire in 1899, 1909 and 1910 and for Lancashire between 1905 and 1923.

Higson was born at Stockport, Cheshire, the son of Jacob Higson, a civil mining engineer, and his wife Eliza Alice Smith He was educated at Rossall School where he was in the cricket XI for three years and captained it in his last year, also being fives champion. He played casual games for an assortment of teams from his late teens. In 1889 he played a match for Lancashire against Cheshire. He was then at New College, Oxford and 1892 he played one match for the university against Lancashire, missing his first innings through injury. Also in 1892 he played for Cheshire against MCC. In 1893 he played for Blackpool against the Australians. By profession, he became a solicitor and played a couple of games for Incogniti in 1896.

Higson played a full season for Derbyshire in 1899, making his debut against Surrey. He achieved his best bowling performance of 4 for 74 against Warwickshire and his top score of 46 against Hampshire. From 1901 he was playing for Lancashire in the first and second XIs. He next played first-class in 1904 for Marylebone Cricket Club (MCC) against South Africans, and in 1905, 1906 and 1907 also played occasional first-class games for Lancashire . In the 1909 season he was back with Derbyshire for one game and then played three matches for the club in the 1910 season. After the war in 1921 he was again with Lancashire playing mainly in the second team, apart from one game in 1923 against West Indies.

Higson was a right-arm off-break bowler and took 41 first-class wickets at an average of 28.41 and a best performance of 4 for 74. He was a right-hand batsman and played 50 innings in 29 first-class matches at an average of 12.69 and a top score of 46.

From 1931 to 1934, Higson was a member of the Selection Committee, with Sir Pelham Warner and P. A. Perrin. He helped to choose the M.C.C. team which visited Australia in 1932–33 for the controversial bodyline tour. On this, his view was that such bowling was detrimental to cricket. He had strong views on many aspects of the game and in 1934 argued for two-day single innings county matches to brighten the game.

Higson was chairman of Lancashire County Cricket Club from 1932 to 1949, in succession to Sir Edwin Stockton.

Higson died at Grange-over-Sands, Lancashire, at the age of 75. His sons Thomas Higson and Peter Higson also played first-class cricket for Lancashire, and his brother Peter Higson played for Cheshire.
