= Arthur Marsden (cricketer) =

English cricketer

Personal information
- Born: 28 October 1880; Buxton, England
- Died: 31 July 1916 (aged 35); St Pancras, London, England
- Batting: Right-handed

Domestic team information
- Years: Team
- 1910: Derbyshire
- Only FC: 2 June 1910 Derbyshire v Kent

Career statistics
Competition	First-class
Matches	1
Runs scored	6
Batting average	3.00
100s/50s	0/0
Top score	6
Catches/stumpings	1/–
- Source: CricketArchive, November 2012

Arthur Marsden (28 October 1880 – 31 July 1916) was an English cricketer who played first-class cricket for Derbyshire in 1910.

Marsden was born in Buxton the son of William E. Marsden, a railway engine driver, and his wife Eliza,

Marsden made one appearance for Derbyshire, in the 1910 season, against Kent in a heavy defeat for the team. Marsden, a right-handed batsman, appeared as an opening batsman in the first innings of the match when he was out for a duck, and scored 6 in his second innings slightly lower down the order.

Marsden died in St. Pancras at the age of 35 from wounds he had suffered during World War I.
