= Frederick Forman =

English cricketer

Frederick Forman (30 August 1884 — 8 December 1960) was an English cricketer. He was born in Chellaston and died in Penzance.

Forman played one first-class match for Derbyshire during the 1911 season, in which he scored a duck in the first innings and just three runs in the second, Derbyshire losing the match by an innings margin.

Forman was a tailend batsman.
