= William Webster (cricketer, born 1880) =

English cricketer (1880–1931)

Personal information
- Born: 1880
- Died: 10 March 1931 (aged 50–51); Dinnington, South Yorkshire

Domestic team information
- Years: Team
- 1911: Derbyshire

William Webster (1880 —10 March 1931) was an English cricketer who played for Derbyshire in 1911.

Webster made a single first-class appearance for the side in May 1911 against Yorkshire. Batting from the lower order, Webster scored three runs in the first innings and a duck in the second, being bowled out both times.

Webster died at Dinnington, Yorkshire at the age of 50.
