= Frederick Barber (cricketer) =

English cricketer

Frederick Arthur Barber (13 May 1887 – 4 June 1943) was an English cricketer who played first-class cricket for Derbyshire between 1907 and 1920.

== Biography ==
Barber was born at Ilkeston, Derbyshire. He made his first-class debut for Derbyshire in May 1907 against Marylebone Cricket Club (MCC) when he took a total of three wickets, but was out for a duck in both innings. He next played two matches in 1911, and then another two matches several years later in 1920. Barber took 9 first-class wickets at an average of 29.66 and a best performance of 2 for 19. He played ten innings in five first-class matches with an average of 3.33 and a top score of 10.

Barber died at The Pastures, Mickleover, Derbyshire at the age of 56.
