= James Handford =

English cricketer (1890–1948)

Personal information
- Full name: James Handford
- Born: 1 February 1890; Hayfield, Derbyshire, England
- Died: 14 August 1948 (aged 58); Stockport, Cheshire, England
- Batting: Right-handed
- Role: Batsman

Domestic team information
- Years: Team
- 1910: Derbyshire

Career statistics
Competition	First-class
Matches	9
Runs scored	137
Batting average	9.78
100s/50s	0/0
Top score	23
Balls bowled	36
Wickets	0
Bowling average	–
5 wickets in innings	–
10 wickets in match	–
Best bowling	–
Catches/stumpings	4/–
- Source: CricInfo, 24 August 2009

James Handford (1 February 1890 – 14 August 1948) was an English cricketer for Derbyshire. A right-handed batsman, he was born in Hayfield, Derbyshire. He placed nine first-class matches for his county during the 1910 County Championship, scoring 137 runs at 9.78. Handford played all around the batting order, making his career best 23 against Essex on 16 May 1910. He went on to play minor cricket for Heavy Woollen District against Yorkshire Second XI in 1911, where he enjoyed his strongest performance, nine and 54 with the bat as well as six wickets – including a five wicket haul – with the ball. He died in Stockport, Cheshire.
