= Carlecotes =

Village in South Yorkshire, England

Coordinates: 53.5261°N 1.73365°W

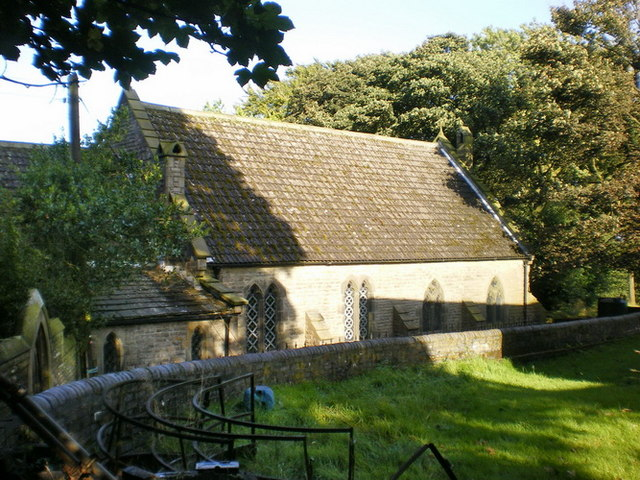
- Church of St Anne, Carlecotes

- Location within South Yorkshire
- OS grid reference: SE177033
  - London: 150 mi (240 km) SSE
- Civil parish: Dunford
- Metropolitan borough: Barnsley
- Metropolitan county: South Yorkshire
- Region: Yorkshire and the Humber
- Country: England
- Sovereign state: United Kingdom
- Post town: Sheffield
- Postcode district: S36
- Dialling code: 01226
- Police: South Yorkshire
- Fire: South Yorkshire
- Ambulance: Yorkshire
- UK Parliament: Barnsley West and Penistone

Carlecotes is a village in the metropolitan borough of Barnsley in South Yorkshire, England. Carlecotes is within Dunford civil parish. The village is situated at the eastern edge of the Peak District National Park, approximately 4 miles (6 km) west from Penistone, and just over 1 mile (1.6 km) north from the A628 road.

Carlecotes' church, dedicated to St Anne, is in the united benefice of Penistone and Thurlstone, and the Diocese of Sheffield. The church was completed in 1857 as a private chapel to Carlecotes Hall, and is a Grade II listed building. Carlecotes Hall, which dates to the 17th century, is 15 yards (14 m) to the north of the church, and also Grade II listed.

== See also ==
- Listed buildings in Dunford
