= List of Suffolk County Cricket Club grounds =

Suffolk County Cricket Club was originally established on 27 July 1864, and competed in the Minor Counties Championship from 1904 to 1914. The present club was founded in August 1932, and has played minor counties cricket from 1934, as well as playing in List A cricket from 1966 to 2005.

The club has used a different number of home grounds. Their first home minor counties fixture in 1904 was against Norfolk at the Town Ground, Felixstowe, while their first home List A match came 62 years later against Kent in the 1966 Gillette Cup at Ipswich School Ground.

== Grounds ==
The 18 grounds that Suffolk have used for home matches since 1904 are listed below.

As of 31 August 2025

Name	Location	List A	MCCA Champ	MCCA Trophy	MCCA T20	First match	Last match	Refs
Town Ground	Felixstowe	0	101	0	0	20 July 1904 v Norfolk	26 July 1983 v Hertfordshire	
Cemetry Road	Bury St Edmunds	0 (Note: Suffolk teams played two first-class matches on the ground in the 19th century before the formation of Suffolk County Cricket Club.)	8	0	0	28 July 1904 v Cambridgeshire	19 August 1914 v Lincolnshire	
Portman Road	Ipswich	0	14	0	0	4 July 1905 v Norfolk	10 August 1914 v Bedfordshire	
Woodbridge School	Woodbridge	0	2	0	0	29 July 1908 v Bedfordshire	10 May 2009 v Hertfordshire	
Denes Oval	Lowestoft	0	31	0	0	4 July 1934 v Lincolnshire	18 August 1971 v Norfolk	
The Victory Ground	Bury St Edmunds	10 (Note: Unicorns played a single List A match against Essex on the ground in 2011. Only matches played by Suffolk are included in the count)	66	9	2	22 July 1935 v Surrey Second XI	20 July 2025 v Buckinghamshire	
Ipswich School Ground	Ipswich	1	42	7	11	7 August 1935 v Hertfordshire	8 June 2025 v Cambridgeshire	
Churchman's Ground	Ipswich	0	3	0	0	29 July 1949 v Hertfordshire	24 August 1951 v Middlesex Second XI	
Ransomes and Reavell Sports Club Ground	Ipswich	0 (Note: Minor Counties East played a single List A match on the ground in 1978. Only matches played by Suffolk are included in the count.)	48	2	0	2 August 1972 v Hertfordshire	23 May 2010 v Berkshire	
Manor Road	Haverhill	0	1	0	0	25 August 1974 v Lincolnshire		
Wamil Way	Mildenhall	3	31	7	0	17 August 1977 v Norfolk	18 May 2025 v Shropshire	
Guardian Royal Exchange Ground	Ipswich	0	8	0	0	3 August 1979 v Buckinghamshire	23 July 1985 v Hertfordshire	
Framlingham College	Framlingham	0	4	10	0	28 July 1985 v Cumberland	24 May 1998 v Norfolk	
Old London Road	Copdock	1	16	8	2	30 August 1992 v Norfolk	10 August 2025 v Staffordshire	
Chilton Fields	Stowmarket	0	1	0	0	1 June 1993 v Hertfordshire		
Exning Park	Exning	0	0	5 (Note: Cambridgeshire County Cricket Club have played on the ground, which is on the border between Cambridgeshire and Suffolk, since 2019.)	0	17 May 1998 v Bedfordshire	26 May 2002 v Cambridgeshire	
Woolpit Sports Field	Woolpit	0	1	1	6	21 May 2017 v Bedfordshire	29 June 2025 v Norfolk	
Friars Street	Sudbury	0	0	7	0	4 July 2021 v Hertfordshire	11 May 2025 v Herefordshire	
