= Thomas Higson (cricketer, born 1911) =

English cricketer

Personal information
- Full name: Thomas Atkinson Higson
- Born: 25 March 1911; Whaley Bridge, Derbyshire, England
- Died: 15 January 1993 (aged 81); Stockport, England
- Batting: Left-handed
- Bowling: Right-arm medium
- Relatives: Thomas Higson (father); Peter Higson (brother)

Domestic team information
- Years: Team
- 1932–1935: Derbyshire
- 1936–1946: Lancashire
- FC debut: 8 June 1932 Derbyshire v Surrey
- Last FC: 17 July 1946 Lancashire v Glamorgan

Career statistics
Competition	First-class
Matches	26
Runs scored	326
Batting average	10.51
100s/50s	0/1
Top score	51
Balls bowled	606
Wickets	6
Bowling average	50.33
5 wickets in innings	0
10 wickets in match	0
Best bowling	1/14
Catches/stumpings	8/–
- Source: CricketArchive, December 2011

Thomas Atkinson Higson (25 March 1911 – 15 January 1993) was an English cricketer who played first-class cricket for Derbyshire from 1932 to 1935 and for Lancashire from 1936 to 1946.

Higson was born at Whaley Bridge, Derbyshire, the son of Thomas Higson. His father also played for Derbyshire and Lancashire.

Higson turned out for Julien Cahn's XI in 1929, and made his debut for Derbyshire against Surrey in June 1932 which was the only first-class match he played that year. He played four games in 1933 making his top score of 51 against Essex and turned out for Derbyshire against the South Africans in 1935. He played 12 innings in 6 matches for Derbyshire with an average of 14.41.

Higson moved to Lancashire in 1935 playing mainly for the second XI with one first team appearance against Warwickshire in that year. He played two first team games in 1937, three in 1938 and almost a full season in 1939. After the war he played unqualifying matches in 1945 and one first-class game in 1946. His batting average was lower for Lancashire but he took all his wickets with the club. Higson was a left-hand batsman and played 32 innings in 26 first-class matches with an average of 10.51 and a top score of 51. He was a right-arm medium pace bowler and took six wickets at an average of 50.33.

Higson was chairman of Lancashire from 1965 to 1968 and president of Lancashire from 1977 to 1978.

Higson died at Stockport at the age of 81. As well as his father, his brother Peter Higson also played first-class cricket.
