= Charles Lowe (cricketer) =

English cricketer (1890–1953)

Charles Lowe (23 June 1890 – 11 May 1953) was an English cricketer who played for Derbyshire from 1909 to 1912.

== Life ==
Lowe was born in Whitwell, Derbyshire. He made his cricket debut for Derbyshire in 1909 against a team of touring Australians. In 1910 he made his first County Championship appearance against Leicestershire. He made two further appearances for Derbyshire during the 1910 season, in which the team finished second-bottom in the table. Lowe made his next and final appearance at the start of the 1912 season in a match that was abandoned. He was a right-handed batsman who played 8 innings in 5 first-class matches with a top score of 17 and an average of 4.16. He was a right-arm medium-fast bowler and took 2 wickets at an average of 45.00 and a best performance of 1–20.

== Death ==
Lowe died in Worksop at the age of 63.
