= Archibald Wickstead =

English cricketer

Personal information
- Full name: Archibald Wickstead
- Born: 6 November 1884; Meltham Mills, Yorkshire, England
- Died: 1 February 1966 (aged 81); Mansfield, Nottinghamshire, England
- Batting: Left-handed
- Bowling: Unknown

Domestic team information
- Years: Team
- 1911–1912: Derbyshire

Career statistics
| Competition | First-class |
|---|---|
| Matches | 14 |
| Runs scored | 385 |
| Batting average | 16.73 |
| 100s/50s | –/2 |
| Top score | 68 |
| Balls bowled | 6 |
| Wickets | 0 |
| Bowling average | – |
| 5 wickets in innings | – |
| 10 wickets in match | – |
| Best bowling | – |
| Catches/stumpings | 2/– |
- Source: Cricinfo, 16 June 2022

Archibald Wickstead (6 November 1884 – 1 February 1966) was an English cricketer who played first-class cricket for Derbyshire in 1911 and 1912.

Wickstead was born at Meltham Mills, Yorkshire. He debuted against Yorkshire in May 1911 with the team's highest score of 24 in the first innings until he was out to England Test bowler Schofield Haigh. He was absent hurt in the second innings, and Derbyshire went to an innings defeat. He was a regular starter in the upper-middle order in his debut season and made 68 against Northamptonshire and 65 against Essex. His one over of bowling was against Lancashire. In 1912 he played against the South Africans and played one County match against Warwickshire. He made little impression in either match.

Wickstead was a left-handed batsman and played 26 innings in 14 matches with an average of 16.73 and a top score of 68. He bowled one over without taking a wicket.

Wickstead died in Mansfield at the age of 82.
