= Arthur Wood (cricketer, born 1892) =

English cricketer

Personal information
- Full name: Arthur John Wood
- Born: 7 February 1892; Derby, England
- Died: 1 March 1951 (aged 59); Norwood, England
- Batting: Right-handed
- Bowling: Right-arm medium-fast

Domestic team information
- Years: Team
- 1911–1912: Derbyshire
- FC debut: 29 July 1911 Derbyshire v Leicestershire
- Last FC: 25 July 1912 Derbyshire v Leicestershire

Career statistics
Competition	First-class
Matches	13
Runs scored	264
Batting average	14.66
100s/50s	0/2
Top score	52
Balls bowled	72
Wickets	0
Bowling average	–
5 wickets in innings	–
10 wickets in match	–
Best bowling	–
Catches/stumpings	5/–
- Source: CricketArchive, November 2012

Arthur John Wood (7 February 1892 – 1 March 1951) was an English cricketer who played for Derbyshire between 1911 and 1912.

== Personal life and career ==
Wood was born in Derby and was educated at Denstone College, playing for the old boys team in later years. He debuted for Derbyshire against Leicestershire in July 1911 when he made 51 in his first innings. He played five games that season in the County Championship and made his second half-century and his highest total of 52 against Nottinghamshire.

In 1912 he played a full season of matches, but only achieved a top score of 25. Wood was a right-handed batsman and played 19 innings in 13 first-class matches with an average of 14.66 and a top score of 52. He was a right-arm medium-fast bowler but took no wickets in the twelve overs he bowled.

Wood died in Norwood, Surrey at the age of 59.
