= John Chapman (cricketer, born 1877) =

English cricketer

Personal information
- Born: 11 March 1877; Frocester, Gloucestershire, England
- Died: 12 August 1956 (aged 79); Carlecotes Yorkshire, England
- Batting: Right-handed

Domestic team information
- Years: Team
- 1909–1920: Derbyshire
- FC debut: 15 May 1909 Derbyshire v Warwickshire
- Last FC: 1 September 1920 Derbyshire v Somerset

Career statistics
Competition	First-class
Matches	113
Runs scored	3,624
Batting average	18.58
100s/50s	2/17
Top score	198
Balls bowled	264
Wickets	1
Bowling average	241.00
5 wickets in innings	0
10 wickets in match	0
Best bowling	1/42
Catches/stumpings	35/–
- Source: CricketArchive, 31 January 2010

John Chapman (11 March 1877 – 12 August 1956) was an English first-class cricketer who played for Derbyshire between 1909 and 1920, and captained the side from 1910 to 1912 and in 1920.

Chapman was born at Frocester, Gloucestershire, the son of Charles Chapman a farmer. He was educated at Uppingham School and in 1899 was playing club cricket for the Incogniti. He also played for Sheffield Collegiate and Barnsley and captained the Yorkshire second team. He joined Derbyshire in the 1909 season, making his debut against Warwickshire when he was not out at the end of a drawn match. He played a full season and in his second match against Warwickshire made his top score of 198. In 1910 he was appointed captain and, again against Warwickshire, he made 165 while putting on 283 for the ninth wicket with Arnold Warren. In 2012 this remained the world record for a ninth-wicket partnership in first-class cricket. Chapman was captain of Derbyshire again in 1911 and 1912. He achieved a batting average of over 30 in the 1911 season, but this was down to 8 in the 1912 Season. He played regularly in the 1913 and 1914 seasons, and also after World War I in 1919.

Chapman took the captaincy again for the disastrous 1920 season, when Derbyshire failed to win a match and he gave up county cricket at the end of the season.

Chapman was described as "An attractive batsman and excellent cover-point". He was a right-hand batsman and played 210 innings in 113 first-class matches with an average of 18.58 and a top score of 198. He took one first-class wicket at the cost of 241 runs.

Chapman died at Carlecotes, Dunford Bridge, Yorkshire at the age of 79.

Sporting positions
Preceded by Albert Lawton	Derbyshire cricket captains 1910–1912	Succeeded by Richard Baggallay
