= Dunford Bridge =

Hamlet in South Yorkshire, England

Coordinates: 53.517°N 1.750°W

- Hamlet
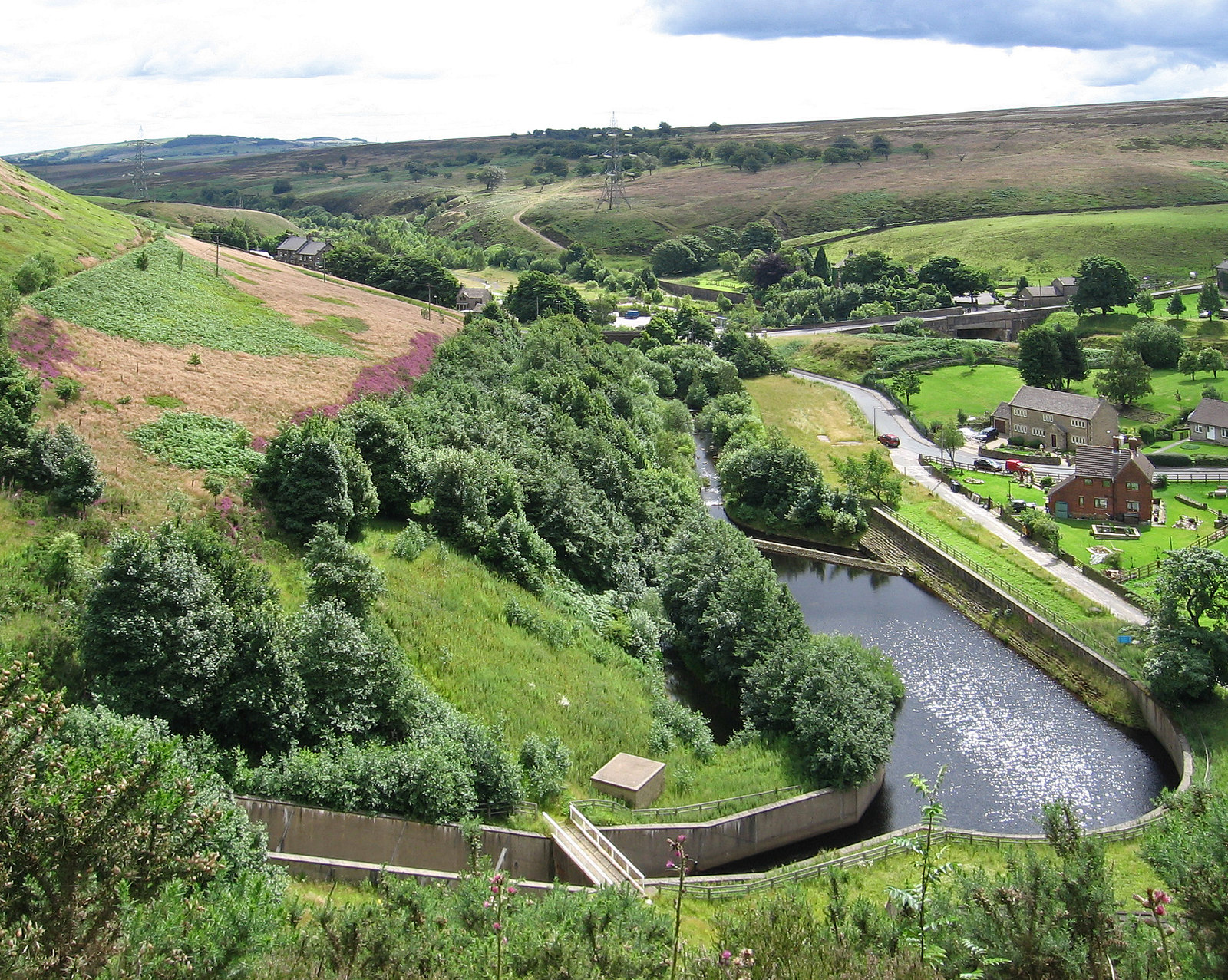
- Dunford Bridge – view from Winscar Reservoir

- Location within South Yorkshire
- Civil parish: Dunford
- Metropolitan borough: Barnsley
- Metropolitan county: South Yorkshire
- Region: Yorkshire and the Humber
- Country: England
- Sovereign state: United Kingdom
- Post town: SHEFFIELD
- Postcode district: S36
- Dialling code: 01226
- Police: South Yorkshire
- Fire: South Yorkshire
- Ambulance: Yorkshire
- UK Parliament: Penistone and Stocksbridge

Dunford Bridge is a remote hamlet in the civil parish of Dunford, in Barnsley, South Yorkshire, England, 1.3 miles (2 km) from the border with West Yorkshire and 2.3 miles (4 km) from the border with Derbyshire. It lies in the Peak District, 5 miles (8 km) west of Penistone and 5 miles (8 km) south of Holmfirth, within the Metropolitan Borough of Barnsley.

The settlement, consisting of a few houses, lies beneath the Winscar Reservoir. Water draining from the moorland around Grains Moss forms small rivers that join together to form the source of the River Don, which feeds into the reservoir. The reservoir had suffered from leakage for many years, until Yorkshire Water, the reservoir owners, employed a construction company to correct the problem, using £400,000 worth of specialist grouting and artificial membrane.

The eastern end of the Woodhead Tunnel is in the centre of the hamlet. The site of the former railway station is now a parking area with the old rail line forming the route of the Trans-Pennine Trail.

In 1974 the two terraces of railway cottages at the eastern tunnel portal, comprising 19 houses, were bought by the Lifespan Educational Trust to establish a commune based on the principles of Summerhill School. The Lifespan Community Collective, which set up a registered housing cooperative and in 1976 opened a wholefood shop in Huddersfield (the cooperative was dissolved in 1987). In the 1980s the community launched a worker cooperative in printing and publishing. The community continues today with about 20 residents; it farms according to permaculture principles and produces the quarterly Communes Network magazine.

The Stanhope Arms Public House (former hunting Lodge belonging to the Stanhope Family) was the only public house in the hamlet of Dunford Bridge. The Stanhope Arms closed down in the early 2000s. It was used as a theatrical and drama training workshop for a short time afterwards but has been a private residence since 2015.

Windle Edge Road leads 1.5 miles southwest from the hamlet to the Woodhead PassA628 and northeast to the B6106 Holmfirth to Penistone road. The A628 gives access westwards to the M67 and Manchester and east to the M1 at Barnsley, and southeast to the A616 and Northern Sheffield.

Dunford Bridge is a centre for watersports enthusiasts. It benefits from walkers exploring the Pennine moorland surrounding the hamlet, using it as a base. There is a car parking area next to the road bridge and further parking along the side of the Winscar Reservoir on Dunford Road, to the north. The reservoir is used by a local sailing club.

On 15 September 2015 National Grid announced a plan to bury electricity cables so that it could remove seven overhead pylons from the village. This was completed in October 2022 when the pylons were removed.

Dunford Bridge was for hundreds of years within the ancient Wapentake of Staincross, an area that almost corresponds with the borders of the modern day Barnsley Metropolitan Area.

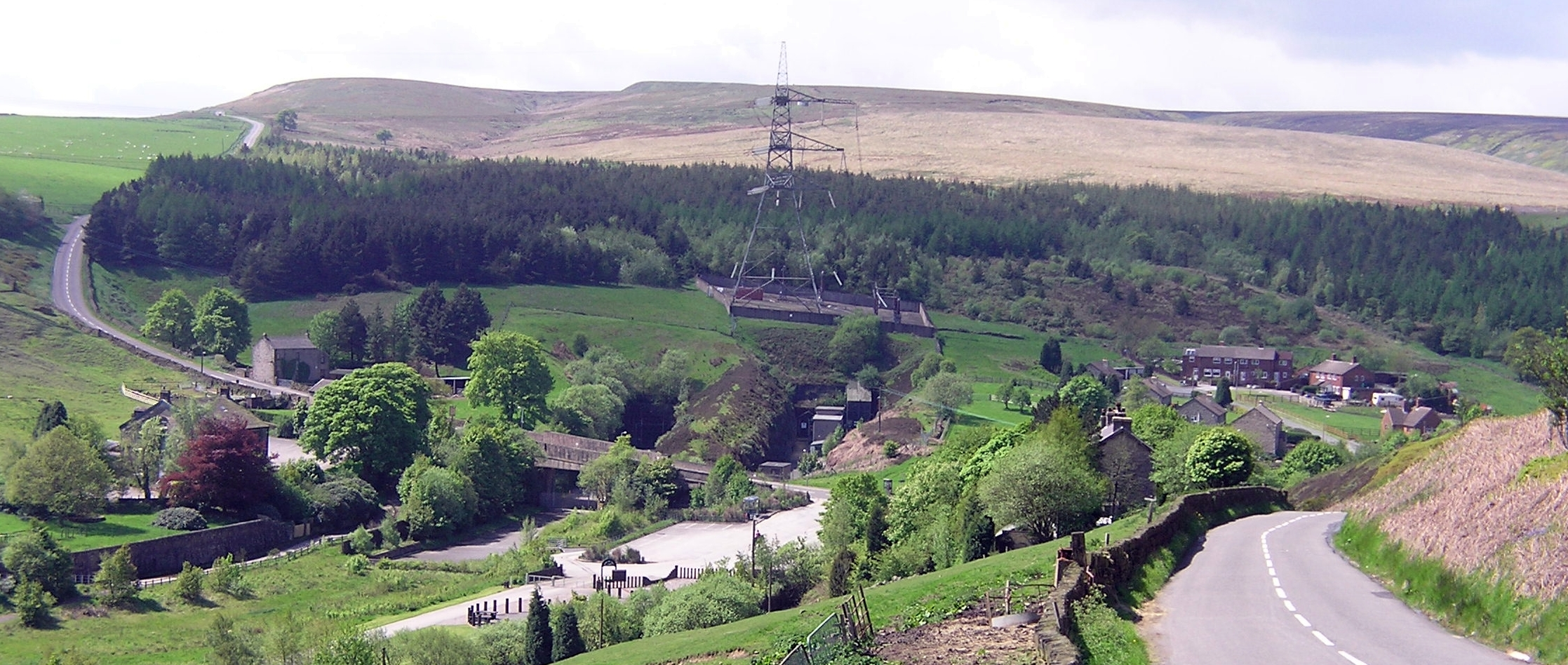
Dunford Bridge (the pylon seen in the picture has subsequently been removed)

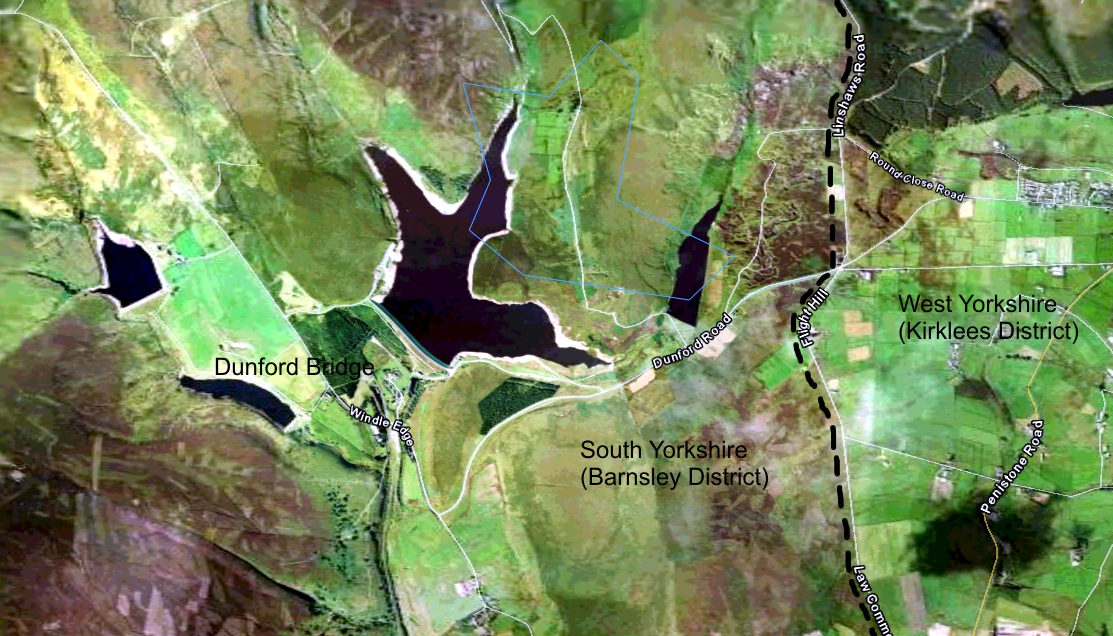
Aerial photo of Dunford Bridge and Winscar Reservoir
