= Australian cricket team in England in 1912 =

Tour of Australian national Cricket team

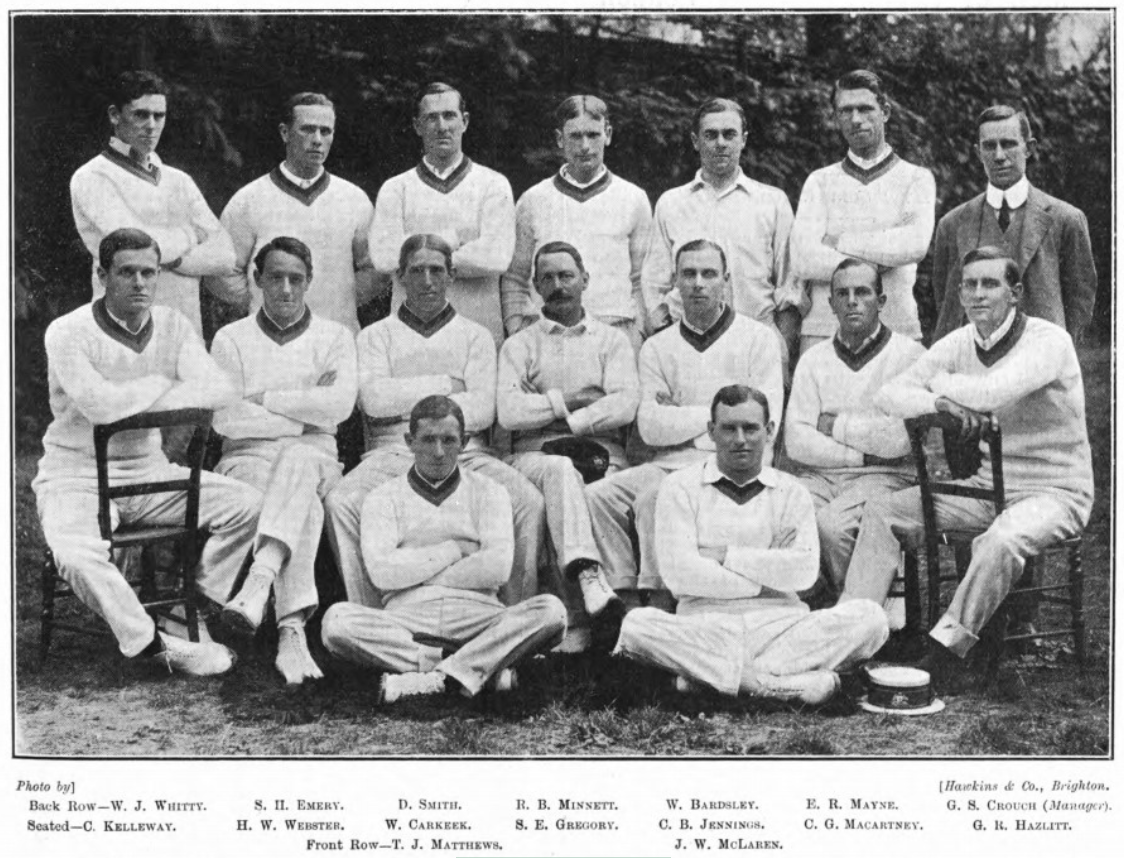
The Australian team that toured England in 1912.

The Australia national cricket team toured England from May to September 1912, and took part in the 1912 Triangular Tournament, playing three Test matches each against the England national cricket team and the South Africa national cricket team. The tournament was won by England. Australia were captained by Syd Gregory.

== Ceylon ==
The Australians had a stopover in Colombo en route to England and on 4 April played a one-day single-innings match there against the Ceylon national team, which at that time did not have Test status.
