= Eric Murray (cricketer) =

South African cricketer (1893–1971)

Eric Claude Murray (18 July 1893 – 10 July 1971) was a South African cricketer who played first-class cricket for Derbyshire in 1911 and for Transvaal between 1912 and 1923.

Murray was born Eric Claude Moses in Johannesburg, Transvaal. He was educated in England at Repton School and played three games for Derbyshire in August 1911. His debut was against Warwickshire. He made few runs and took no wickets.

Murray returned to South Africa and played for Transvaal from the 1912–13 season. After 1913–14, his career was interrupted by the First World War. Resuming in 1919–20 he played three more seasons.

Murray was a right-hand batsman who played 18 innings in 11 first-class matches with a top score of 31 and an average of 7.35. He was a right-arm off-break bowler and took 17 first-class wickets at an average of 17.11 and a best performance of 4 for 32.

Murray died at Durban, Natal, South Africa at the age of 77.
