= Fred Root =

English cricketer

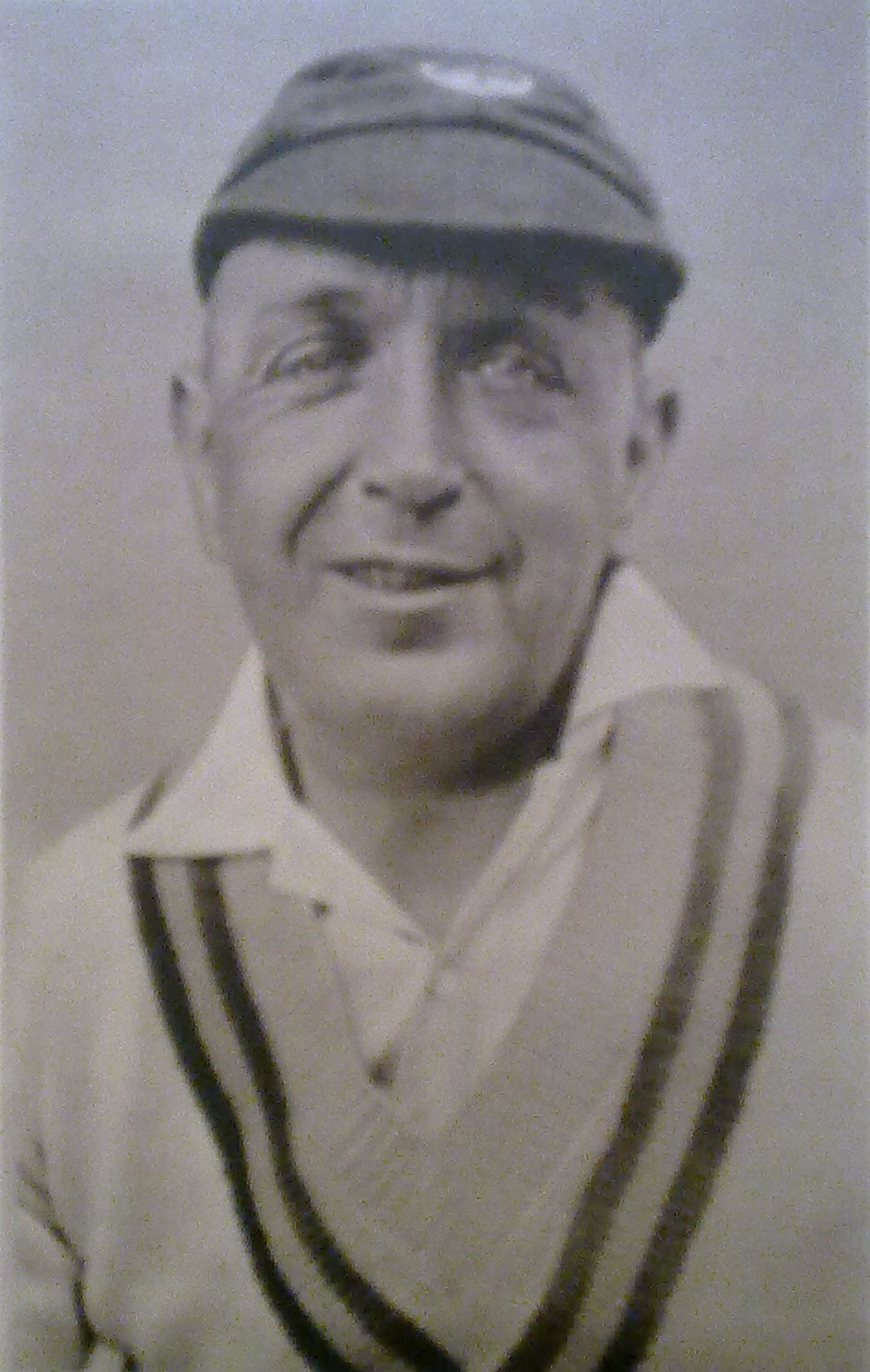

Personal information
- Full name: Charles Frederick Root
- Born: 16 April 1890; Somercotes, Derbyshire, England
- Died: 20 January 1954 (aged 63); Wolverhampton, England
- Batting: Right-handed
- Bowling: Right-arm fast-medium

International information
- National side: England
- Test debut: 12 June 1926 v Australia
- Last Test: 24 July 1926 v Australia

Domestic team information
- Years: Team
- 1910–1920: Derbyshire
- 1921–1932: Worcestershire

Career statistics
Competition	Test	First-class
Matches	3	365
Runs scored	–	7,911
Batting average	–	14.78
100s/50s	–	1/23
Top score	–	107
Balls bowled	642	80,614
Wickets	8	1,512
Bowling average	24.25	21.11
5 wickets in innings	0	125
10 wickets in match	0	33
Best bowling	4/84	9/23
Catches/stumpings	1/–	244/–
- Source: CricketArchive, 11 July 2010

Charles Frederick Root (16 April 1890 – 20 January 1954) was an English cricketer who played for England in 1926 and for Derbyshire between 1910 and 1920 and for Worcestershire between 1921 and 1932.

== Early career ==
Root was born in Somercotes, Derbyshire and initially served on ground staff of Leicestershire before beginning his first-class career for Derbyshire, making his debut in the 1910 season. He played for five seasons for Derbyshire before cricket was suspended in England because of World War I, doing very little apart from a couple of promising performances in 1913. During the war, Root was hit in the chest while serving as a dispatch rider, but recovered and resumed his cricketing career after the war.

== Worcestershire ==
Root moved to Worcestershire in 1921 after two seasons in league cricket. After a season and a half when he failed to establish himself as an orthodox right-arm fast medium bowler, Root became an exponent of the leg theory style of bowling, and achieved great success with it. His ability to swing the ball in and make it gain pace off the ground made him very difficult on anything like a fiery pitch, whilst his powerful physique and consequent stamina made Root respected even on pitches giving bowlers no assistance. In 1923 he took 170 wickets for 20.53 each and 153 for less than 17 each in 1924, but spoilt his chances of going on that winter's Ashes tour with a poor performance for the Players at The Oval on a pitch that should have suited him.

His character may be summed up by an event in a match against Glamorgan. The batsmen, Arnold Dyson and Eddie Bates, had collided mid-pitch, and the ball was returned to Root, the bowler. Root didn't break the stumps, as both batsmen seemed injured. An amateur repeatedly shouted, "Break the wicket, Fred, break the wicket!" until Root said: "If you want to run him out, here's the ball: you come and do it." The amateur responded with the words, "Oh, I'm an amateur. I can't do such a thing."

== England selection ==
Although Worcestershire were entering a period where they were the weakest of the County teams, Root's tireless, accurate and lively bowling only improved. In 1925, he took a record 207 wickets for the county, almost half of Worcestershire's wickets in first-class matches. During the late 1920s, Root was effectively the team's only penetrative bowler.

In 1926, Root took 7 for 42 against the Australians on a pitch so dead as to be quite unsuited to him. Though he was less effective than previously in county cricket (soft pitches may have played a part), Root played three Test matches for England against Australia that year. Unusually, he was unable to bat in any of the three tests, due to rain interruptions and the depth of the England batting. Root still holds the record for the most Test Matches in a career without ever batting.

== Later years ==
In 1927, Root took 145 Championship wickets as the County won only one of thirty fixtures. The batsman's pitches of 1928 resulted in an expensive yield though he did achieve the double for the only time in his career. Root's 146 wickets in 1929 was almost triple the next best return by his teammates. In 1931, he took 9 for 23 against Lancashire, representing the best bowling ever achieved for Worcestershire.

Root declined rapidly in 1932 and lost his place. Apart from one match for Sir L Parkinson's XI in 1933, Root retired from first-class cricket after this. He spent some time as coach to Leicestershire, and also continued to play club cricket in the Lancashire League. He also remained a keen observer of the international game, and was unimpressed by Australian protests against Bodyline, saying that their players should stick to playing with tennis balls if they could not learn how to play it. Root also wrote a well-known book about the life of professional cricketers, A Cricket Pro's Lot (1937).

== As an umpire ==
Root stood as an umpire in 35 first-class matches between 1947 and 1949.

== Bowling method ==
After Root joined Worcestershire, he changed his bowling style to deliver fast-medium in-swingers with a leg trap of up to five fielders. An illustration appears in the 1926 Cricketer of this employed against Australia. There is speculation that it may have influenced the thinking of Douglas Jardine when he was contemplating the use of bodyline against Don Bradman. Current regulations render this illegal.

Root died in a Wolverhampton hospital in 1954.
