= South African cricket team in England in 1912 =

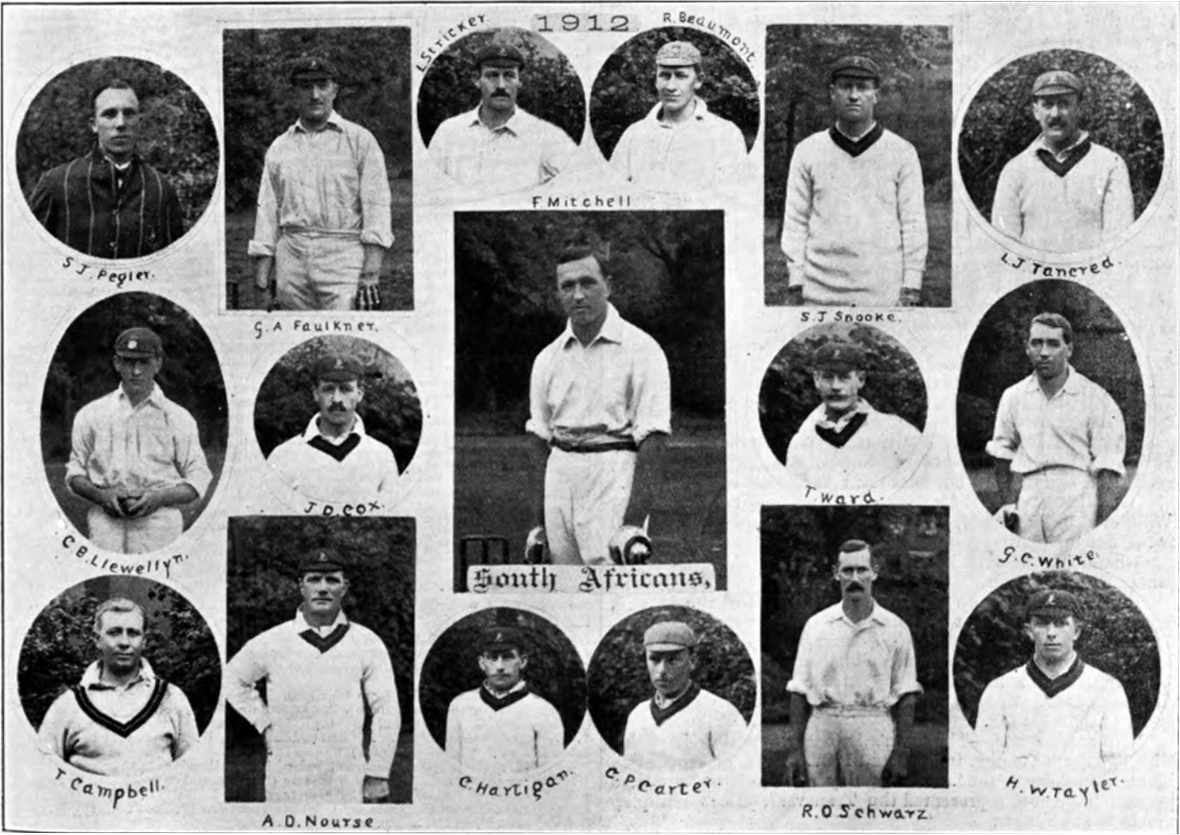
The South African team that toured England in 1912.

The South Africa national cricket team toured England from May to September 1912 and took part in the 1912 Triangular Tournament, playing three Test matches each against the England national cricket team and the Australia national cricket team. The tournament was won by England. South Africa were captained by Frank Mitchell and Louis Tancred.
