= Richard Sale (cricketer) =

English cricketer

Personal information
- Full name: Richard Sale
- Born: 21 June 1889; Broughty Ferry, Angus, Scotland
- Died: 7 September 1970 (aged 81); East Hanney, Berkshire, England
- Batting: Left-handed
- Bowling: Right-arm medium-fast
- Relatives: Dick Sale (son)

Domestic team information
- Years: Team
- 1908–1912: Derbyshire
- 1909–1911: Oxford University
- FC debut: 3 August 1908 Derbyshire v Hampshire
- Last FC: 13 June 1912 Derbyshire v Hampshire

Career statistics
Competition	First-class
Matches	39
Runs scored	961
Batting average	14.13
100s/50s	0/3
Top score	69
Balls bowled	734
Wickets	10
Bowling average	47.10
5 wickets in innings	0
10 wickets in match	0
Best bowling	2/25
Catches/stumpings	12/–
- Source: CricketArchive, July 2012

Richard Sale (21 June 1889 – 7 September 1970) was an English cricketer who played first-class cricket for Derbyshire between 1908 and 1912 and for Oxford University between 1909 and 1911.

Sale was born at Broughty Ferry, Angus, Scotland. He was educated at Repton School and was in the Repton XI from 1906 to 1908. He was then at Oxford University. He made his debut for Derbyshire in the 1908 season in August 1908 and scored 31 in his second innings in a victory against Hampshire. He played six more matches in the 1908 season. In 1909 he joined the Oxford University team and spent the three years to 1911 closing the season for Derbyshire after playing his matches for Oxford University. Sale was a left-hand batsman and played 70 innings in 39 first-class matches, with a top score of 69 and an average of 14.13. He was a right-arm fast-medium bowler who took 10 first-class wickets in all at an average of 47.10 and a best performance of 2 for 25.

Sale became a schoolmaster at Shrewsbury School and ran the junior OTC during World War I.

He died at East Hanney, Berkshire, at the age of 81.

Sale married Rachel Cattley on 1 January 1919. Their son Dick Sale also played for Derbyshire.
