= Derbyshire County Cricket Club in 1914 =

1914 season of an English cricket team

Derbyshire County Cricket Club seasons
1914 season
- Captain: Richard Baggallay
- County Championship: 12
- Most runs: Arthur Morton
- Most wickets: Tom Forrester
- Most catches: Joe Humphries

Derbyshire County Cricket Club in 1914 represents the last cricket season before World War I and was when the English club Derbyshire had been playing for forty three years. It was the club's twentieth season in the County Championship and the team won five matches, ending twelfth in the Championship table.

== 1914 season ==
Derbyshire CCC played twenty games in the County Championship in 1914 and no other matches. The captain for the year was Richard Baggallay in his second season as captain. Arthur Morton was top scorer. Tom Forrester took most wickets with 70.

Players who made their debut in 1914 and continued playing for Derbyshire after the war were Walter Reader-Blackton, Geoffrey Bell and James Horsley who had previously played for Nottinghamshire. Joseph Gladwin made his debut in 1914 playing two matches and played one match in 1818. Colin Hurt only played his three first class matches in 1914.

First class cricket and the County Championship were suspended during the Great War and did not resume again until the 1919 season.

=== Matches ===
List of matches
No.	Date	V	Result	Margin	Notes
1	9 May 1914	Worcestershire; County Ground, Derby	Won	Innings and 158 runs	AG Slater 6–19 and 5–24
2	16 May 1914	Lancashire; Old Trafford, Manchester	Lost	35 runs	Sharp 105; T Forrester 5–47 and 5–83
3	23 May 1914	Nottinghamshire; Queen's Park, Chesterfield	Won	5 runs	Wass 6–86 and 7–91
4	27 May 1914	Hampshire; May's Bounty, Basingstoke	Lost	8 wickets	AG Slater 99; Greig 100; Jacques 8–67 and 6–38; SWA Cadman 6–94
5	1 Jun 1914	Essex; County Ground, Leyton	Lost	145 runs	T Forrester 7–89 and 7–124; Johnny Douglas 6–77 and 6–73
6	8 Jun 1914	Yorkshire; Headingley, Leeds	Lost	Innings and 5 runs	Wilson 101; SWA Cadman 5–69; W Rhodes 7–19
7	11 Jun 1914	Warwickshire; Edgbaston, Birmingham	Lost	125 runs	F Foster 6–18; A Morton 5–26; Howell 6–31
8	20 Jun 1914	Northamptonshire; County Ground, Derby	Drawn		L Oliver 124; Denton 102; Haywood 100
9	27 Jun 1914	Somerset; Queen's Park, Chesterfield	Won	167 runs	White 5–61; J Horsley 5–32
10	4 Jul 1914	Nottinghamshire; Trent Bridge, Nottingham	Lost	152 runs	Payton 104; Barratt 5–54 and 5–68
11	11 Jul 1914	Lancashire; County Ground, Derby	Drawn		Bullough 5–123
12	16 Jul 1914	Yorkshire; Queen's Park, Chesterfield	Lost	Innings and 48 runs	J Horsley 6–77; Drake 5–6
13	24 Jul 1914	Northamptonshire; County Ground, Northampton	Lost	Innings and 3 runs	Thompson 6–52 and 5–80; J Horsley 5–77
14	30 Jul 1914	Somerset; County Ground, Taunton	Lost	6 wickets	Robson 7–32 and 7–64; SWA Cadman 6–27
15	3 Aug 1914	Essex; County Ground, Derby	Lost	Innings and 131 runs	A Morton 6–95; Johnny Douglas 6–21; Tremlin 6–43
16	6 Aug 1914	Leicestershire; Aylestone Road, Leicester	Drawn		Brown 7–51 and 5–78
17	10 Aug 1914	Warwickshire; County Ground, Derby	Lost	6 wickets	Foster 5–47; Santall 5–66; AG Slater 6–51
18	13 Aug 1914	Hampshire; Queen's Park, Chesterfield	Lost	15 runs	A Morton 5–31; Kennedy 5–71; AG Slater 5–89; Newman 7–64
19	17 Aug 1914	Leicestershire; The Town Ground, Burton-on-Trent	Won	6 wickets	Wood 147; J Horsley 6–17
20	29 Aug 1914	Worcestershire; County Ground, New Road, Worcester	Won	5 wickets	M Foster 158; SWA Cadman 119; J Horsley 5–40

== Statistics ==
=== County Championship batting averages ===
Name	Matches	Inns	Runs	High score	Average	100s
A Morton	20	38	1023	96	27.64	0
NM Hughes-Hallett	3	5	137	67	27.40	0
SWA Cadman	20	38	830	119*	23.05	1
J Chapman	9	16	354	88	22.12	0
L Oliver	19	36	780	124	21.66	1
AG Slater	20	38	757	99	19.92	0
G Curgenven	18	31	565	86	18.83	0
G Beet	13	25	388	45	16.16	0
J Bowden	16	30	428	70	15.85	0
T Forrester	19	33	389	35	12.96	0
J Humphries	15	28	210	46*	12.35	0
H Wild	7	13	112	47	11.20	0
J Horsley	13	22	167	55	11.13	0
RRC Baggallay	11	21	231	66	11.00	0
CF Root	3	6	44	25	8.80	0
GL Jackson	1	2	16	9	8.00	0
FC Bracey	7	12	44	10*	6.28	0
CNB Hurt	3	5	23	13	4.60	0
J Gladwin	2	4	8	5*	4.00	0
W Reader-Blackton	1	1	31	31*	0	
GF Bell	1	1	0	0	0.00	0

=== County Championship bowling averages ===
Name	Balls	Runs	Wickets	BB	Average
T Forrester	3739	1405	70	7–89	20.07
AG Slater	2864	1264	69	6–19	18.31
J Horsley	1921	915	56	6–17	16.33
A Morton	3229	1298	50	6–95	25.96
SWA Cadman	2252	985	44	6–27	22.38
CF Root	494	238	8	4–51	29.75
FC Bracey	366	144	7	3–5	20.57
J Gladwin	30	20	1	1–15	20.00
L Oliver	58	44	1	1–19	44.00
J Chapman	102	83	1	1–42	83.00
G Curgenven	24	6	0		
CNB Hurt	18	6	0		
G Beet	24	18	0		
H Wild	96	47	0		

=== Wicket Keeping ===
- Joe Humphries – Catches 21, Stumping 7

== See also ==
- Derbyshire County Cricket Club seasons
- 1914 English cricket season
