= Alonzo Drake =

English footballer and cricketer (1884–1919)

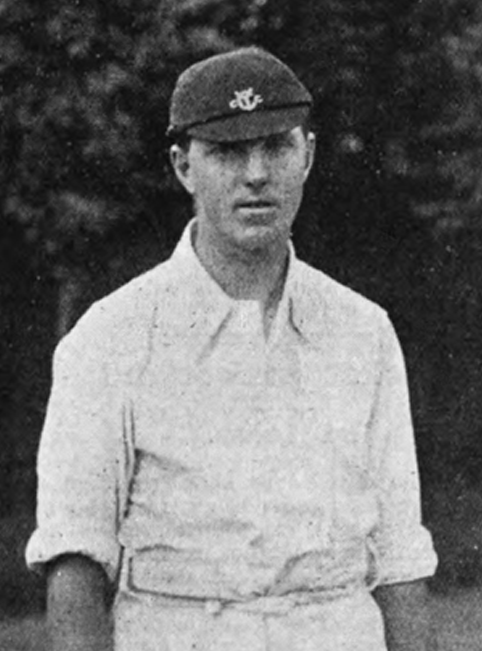

Personal information
- Full name: Alonzo Robson Drake
- Date of birth: 16 April 1884
- Place of birth: Parkgate, Rotherham, England
- Date of death: 14 February 1919 (aged 34)
- Place of death: Honley, England
- Height: 5 ft 10 in (1.78 m)
- Position: Forward

Youth career
- Parkgate

Senior career*
Years	Team	Apps	(Gls)
1902–1903	Doncaster Rovers	36	(7)
1903–1907	Sheffield United	95	(20)
1907–1908	Birmingham	11	(2)
1908–1909	Queens Park Rangers	19	(5)
1909–1914	Huddersfield Town		
1914–1915	Rotherham Town		
- * Club domestic league appearances and goals

Alonzo Robson Drake (16 April 1884 – 14 February 1919) was an English footballer and first-class cricketer.

Born in Rotherham, Drake was a good all-round sportsman but initially focused on his football career. Starting out with Doncaster Rovers it would be at his next club, Sheffield United, where he enjoyed most success, playing in the top flight of English football. After leaving the Blades he had spells at Birmingham, Queens Park Rangers, Huddersfield Town and Rotherham Town before retiring at the outset of World War I.

Drake also played 157 matches for Yorkshire between 1909 and 1914. Despite making his first-class debut at the relatively late age of 25, Drake was a vital part of the Yorkshire team in the seasons before World War I.

== Football career ==
Drake started his career with Doncaster Rovers, for whom he made his Football League debut in 1902 but was soon bought by Sheffield United where he became a regular in the side for three seasons. Despite this he was viewed by some supporters as lazy with claims that he conceded possession too easily which led to regular barracking during games. He moved to Birmingham in December 1907 for £700 but his stay was only a brief one, as he moved south to Queens Park Rangers the following August. His best days now behind him he later spent five years at Huddersfield Town before finishing his career with Rotherham Town.

== Cricket career ==
Alonzo Drake
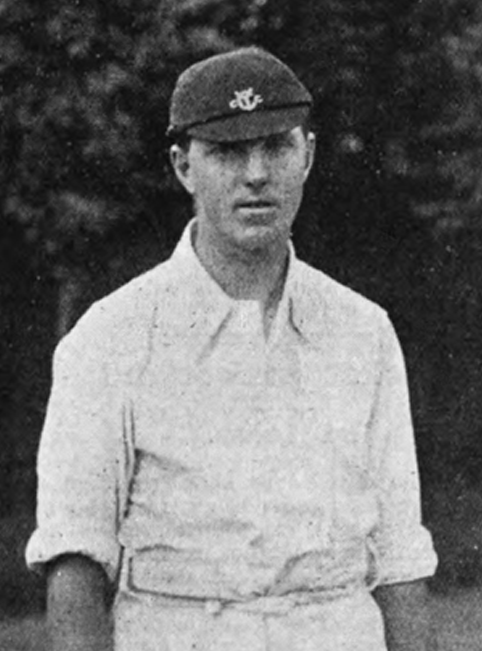

Cricket information
- Batting: Left-handed
- Bowling: Left-arm slow-medium

Domestic team information
- Years: Team
- 1909–1914: Yorkshire

Career statistics
Competition	First-class
Matches	157
Runs scored	4,816
Batting average	21.69
100s/50s	3/20
Top score	147*
Balls bowled	21,293
Wickets	480
Bowling average	18.03
5 wickets in innings	29
10 wickets in match	1
Best bowling	10/35
Catches/stumpings	93/–
- Source: ESPNcricinfo, 21 April 2011

Drake played for the Yorkshire Second XI in 1908 and 1909, the year he first broke into the first team. He took 12 wickets in five matches, and 28 in 1910 including a spell of 5/10 against Western Counties, at Titwood, Glasgow. In 1911, he finally established himself in the Yorkshire side. A more than useful left-handed batsman, he averaged 35 with the bat and took 79 wickets at 22.40.

In 1913, he took 102 wickets at the top of the Yorkshire averages and, in the last season of a truncated career, claimed 135 wickets at 15.30, including 11 five-wicket hauls. Like Schofield Haigh, he was devastating on poor or rain affected wickets but, unlike Haigh, could bowl long spells and had a fine economy rate on flatter batting tracks. He took five wickets in an innings 29 times.

He claimed remarkable 4/4 and 3/3 returns, for match figures of 7/7, against Somerset at The Recreation Ground, Bath in 1913. He grabbed 5/6 in the second innings against Derbyshire at Queen's Park, Chesterfield in 1914, including the wickets of Richard Baggallay, Gilbert Curgenven, Colin Hurt and Thomas Forrester in consecutive balls. His most famous feat was the taking all ten Somerset wickets for 35 at Clarence Park, Weston-super-Mare in August 1914, when he took 15 in the match for 51 runs. He bowled unchanged throughout both innings of the match. Only Drake, Hedley Verity (twice), and Frank Smailes, have taken all ten wickets in an innings for Yorkshire.

He took a hat-trick against Essex at Fartown Ground, Huddersfield in 1912, in a spell in which he took 5 wickets and conceded no runs. He took three wickets in four balls in a first-class 'friendly' Roses Match at The Circle, Kingston upon Hull that year. He bowled unchanged with Major Booth throughout the game in consecutive matches in 1914 – against Gloucestershire and Somerset. In the match against Somerset, he took all ten wickets in the space of just 42 balls.

His batting continued to be useful. He scored 4,816 runs in all, with three centuries and a best of 147* against Derbyshire, for an average of 21.69.

== Personal life ==
Drake was a heavy smoker and was twice rejected by the army when he tried to enlist at the outbreak of World War I. He subsequently fell into ill health, and died aged 34 in February 1919, in Honley, Yorkshire.
