= Archibold =

Archibold is a given name and a surname. Notable people with the name include:

== First name ==
- Archibold Cooper (1878–1922), English cricketer
- Archibold Figlan, South African politician
- Archibold Jomo Nyambi (born 1972), South African politician

== Surname ==
- Franklin Archibold (born 1996), Panamanian cyclist
- Henry Archibold (?–1669), Lieutenant Colonel in the English Army
- Randal C. Archibold (born 1965), American journalist
