= Curgenven =

Curgenven is a Cornish surname; variant forms of it are Cargenven and Corgenvin. There are records of persons with this name in Cornwall and Devon parish registers of the 18th and 19th centuries. It is also the title of an 1893 novel by Sabine Baring-Gould.

Persons bearing the name include:

- Gerald Curgenven, the last lord of the manor of Trevalga (died 1959)
- Gilbert Curgenven, English cricketer
- Henry Curgenven, English cricketer
- William Curgenven, English surgeon and cricketer
