= Derbyshire County Cricket Club in 1913 =

1913 season of an English cricket team

Derbyshire County Cricket Club seasons
1913 season
- Captain: Richard Baggallay
- County Championship: 13
- Most runs: Leonard Oliver
- Most wickets: Thomas Forrester
- Most catches: Joe Humphries

Derbyshire County Cricket Club in 1913 was the cricket season when the English club Derbyshire had been playing for forty two years. It was their nineteenth season in the County Championship and they won four matches to finish thirteenth in the Championship table.

== 1913 season ==
Derbyshire played eighteen matches which were all in the County Championship. After winning their first three matches convincingly the team's form declined and they did not win again until the last match of the season.

Richard Baggallay was in his first year as captain. Leonard Oliver scored most runs and Thomas Forrester took most wickets.

First class cricket was suspended for the duration of the war, and most of the new players in the season had their potential limitied after 1914. Of the players who made their debut the greatest contributor was Harold Wild who played 32 matches in four seasons. Thomas Revill also played intermittently over four seasons. Norton Hughes-Hallett played in the two seasons before the war, while Terence Cole and Willie Smith only appeared in the 1913 season.

=== Matches ===
List of matches
No.	Date	V	Result	Margin	Notes
1	12 May 1913	Essex; County Ground, Leyton	Won	9 wickets	Tremlin 5-46
2	15 May 1913	Hampshire; County Ground, Southampton	Won	8 wickets	Bowell 103; T Forrester 5-88
3	21 May 1913	Warwickshire; County Ground, Derby	Won	7 wickets	L Oliver 103; Foster 5-54
4	30 May 1913	Lancashire; Queen's Park, Chesterfield	Lost	Innings and 25 runs	AG Slater 5-43; Dean 6-45; Whitehead 7-61
5	05 Jun 1913	Somerset; County Ground, Taunton	Lost	91 runs	CF Root 6-42; White 6-26 and 6-57
6	09 Jun 1913	Sussex; County Ground, Hove	Lost	Innings and 92 runs	Relf 6-46 and 5-23; T Forrester 5-76; Holloway 5-69
7	12 Jun 1913	Hampshire; County Ground, Derby	Lost	9 wickets	Bowell 104; Newman 6-51; SWA Cadman 5-78
8	21 Jun 1913	Northamptonshire; Miners Welfare Ground, Blackwell	Lost	9 wickets	Seymour 136; Thompson 6-65
9	28 Jun 1913	Leicestershire; Queen's Park, Chesterfield	Lost	Innings and 43 runs	de Trafford 137; Shipman 5-40
10	04 Jul 1913	Nottinghamshire; Trent Bridge, Nottingham	Lost	Innings and 125 runs	T Forrester 7-127; Iremonger 6-21
11	10 Jul 1913	Sussex; County Ground, Derby	Drawn		Vine 136
12	14 Jul 1913	Somerset; County Ground, Derby	Lost	59 runs	A Morton 7-43 and 6-75; White 5-45; Robson 5-51
13	21 Jul 1913	Warwickshire; Edgbaston, Birmingham	Lost	Innings and 31 runs	Parsons 118; Field 6-25
14	26 Jul 1913	Leicestershire; Bath Grounds, Ashby-de-la-Zouch	Drawn		SWA Cadman 122; Astill 5-59; CF Root 5-32; Wood 5-33
15	04 Aug 1913	Essex; County Ground, Derby	Drawn		Freeman 100; SWA Cadman 7-39; Davies 6-57
16	08 Aug 1913	Lancashire; Old Trafford, Manchester	Drawn		J Tyldesley 5-59; T Forrester 6-72; Dean 5-55
17	15 Aug 1913	Northamptonshire; County Ground, Northampton	Lost	151 runs	FC Bracey 6-62; S SMith 6-82; A Morton 6-95
18	23 Aug 1913	Nottinghamshire; Queen's Park, Chesterfield	Won	21 runs	Iremonger 6-63; Wass 6-16; A Morton 6-33

== Statistics ==
=== County Championship batting averages ===
Name	Matches	Inns	Runs	High score	Average	100s
L Oliver	18	36	957	103*	28.14	1
SWA Cadman	17	34	869	122	27.15	1
CJ Corbett	3	6	126	49	21.00	0
AG Slater	18	32	623	76	20.76	0
T Forrester	18	32	567	87	19.55	0
G Beet	7	14	213	59	16.38	0
A Morton	15	28	430	59	15.92	0
TGO Cole	6	11	171	36	15.54	0
J Humphries	17	30	331	51*	15.04	0
J Chapman	11	20	284	76	14.94	0
RRC Baggallay	15	29	415	88	14.82	0
A Warren	8	13	154	61	12.83	0
TF Revill	2	4	30	12	10.00	0
FC Bracey	14	25	113	18*	9.41	0
J Bowden	5	7	65	32	9.28	0
CF Root	14	25	210	42	9.13	0
NM Hughes-Hallett	3	6	41	32	8.20	0
GL Jackson	2	4	21	19	5.25	0
H Wild	3	6	22	9	4.40	0
W Smith	2	4	13	8	3.25	0

=== County Championship bowling averages ===
Name	Balls	Runs	Wickets	BB	Average
T Forrester	4273	1784	65	7-127	27.44
A Morton	2887	1117	60	7-43	18.61
SWA Cadman	2852	1044	49	7-39	21.30
FC Bracey	1316	637	26	6-62	24.50
CF Root	1459	725	26	6-42	27.88
AG Slater	832	426	16	5-43	26.62
A Warren	774	385	13	4-67	29.61
GL Jackson	174	97	6	3-52	16.16
H Wild	114	46	2	1-3	23.00
NM Hughes-Hallett	48	27	1	1-16	27.00
L Oliver	24	10	0		
CJ Corbett	12	5	0		
J Bowden	6	3	0		

=== Wicket Keepers ===
- Joe Humphries Catches 30, Stumping 5

== See also ==
- Derbyshire County Cricket Club seasons
- 1913 English cricket season
