= George Gunn =

George Gunn may refer to:

- George Gunn (Canadian politician) (1833–1901?), politician in Manitoba, Canada
- George Gunn (cricketer) (1879–1958), English cricketer
- George P. Gunn (1903–1973), American Episcopal Bishop of Southern Virginia
- George Gunn Jr. (cricketer) (1905–1957), English cricketer, son of the older cricketer
- George Ward Gunn (1912–1941), British recipient of the Victoria Cross in World War II
- George F. Gunn Jr. (1927–1998), U.S. federal judge
- George Gunn, New Zealand landowner for whom Lake Gunn is named
