= John Bullough =

John Bullough may refer to:

- John Bullough (businessman) (1969–2023), British businessman
- John Bullough (cricketer) (1893–1967), English cricketer
