= Derbyshire County Cricket Club in 1902 =

1902 season of an English cricket team

Derbyshire County Cricket Club seasons
1902 season
- Captain: Albert Lawton
- County Championship: 10
- Most runs: Maynard Ashcroft
- Most wickets: Billy Bestwick
- Most catches: Joe Humphries

Derbyshire County Cricket Club in 1902 was the cricket season when the English club Derbyshire had been playing for thirty-one years. It was their eighth season in the County Championship and they won five matches to finish tenth in the Championship table.

== 1902 season ==
Derbyshire played sixteen games in the County Championship in 1902, two matches against London County, one match against MCC and one against the touring Australians.

Derbyshire won four matches in the County Championship which brought them up to tenth in the table. The captain for the year was Albert Lawton in his first season as captain. Maynard Ashcroft was top scorer. Billy Bestwick took most wickets.

The most significant additions to the Derbyshire squad in the season was Thomas Forrester who carried on playing for the club for many seasons. Also making his debut was Charles Ollivierre the first Caribbean to play for an English county who also played several seasons. Noah Buxton played occasionally until 1911 and Guy Wilson played once in 1902 and once in 1905. Other players who made their debut but played only in 1902 were Charles Lyon who played two matches and Ernest Stapleton, Archibold Cooper and Bert Hall who played one each.

=== Matches ===
List of matches
No.	Date	V	Result	Margin	Notes
1	19 May 1902	Hampshire; County Ground, Southampton	Won	180 runs	Llewellyn 7-59; JJ Hulme 5-57 and 7-48; Soar 5-80
2	29 May 1902	Yorkshire; Dewsbury and Savile Ground	Drawn		TL Taylor 106
3	05 Jun 1902	Yorkshire Queen's Park, Chesterfield	Drawn		TL Taylor 142; JJ Hulme 5-68; Hirst 5-32; Haigh 5-31
4	09 Jun 1902	Warwickshire; Edgbaston, Birmingham	Lost	9 wickets	Hargreave 6-54; Santall 5-50
5	12 Jun 1902	Worcestershire; North Road Ground, Glossop	Drawn		W Bestwick 7-28; Wilson 6-53
6	19 Jun 1902	Australians; County Ground, Derby	Lost	8 wickets	W Bestwick 6-82; Saunders 6-40
7	23 Jun 1902	MCC; Lord's Cricket Ground, St John's Wood	Lost	6 wickets	Trott 7-84; Mead 6-36
8	26 Jun 1902	London County Cricket Club; County Ground, Derby	Lost	6 wickets	AE Lawton 149; CJB Wood 124; Grace 5-105; Llewellyn 5-92 and 6-101
9	30 Jun 1902	Leicestershire; Queen's Park, Chesterfield	Drawn		LG Wright 101; EM Ashcroft 104; AE Knight 103
10	03 Jul 1902	Surrey; Kennington Oval	Lost	7 wickets	VFS Crawford 101; W Bestwick 6-107; Richardson 5-81
11	10 Jul 1902	Leicestershire; Aylestone Road, Leicester	Won	242 runs	EM Ashcroft 162; Coe 6-40; A Warren 7-70
12	14 Jul 1902	Nottinghamshire; County Ground, Derby	Lost	9 wickets	Iremonger 146; Gunn 120; Hallam 5-46; Wass 6-152
13	21 Jul 1902	London County Cricket Club; Crystal Palace Park	Won	99 runs	Gill 6-83; W Bestwick 8-52; Braund 5-70
14	24 Jul 1902	Essex; County Ground, Derby	Lost	120 runs	McGahey 5-24; JJ Hulme 5-18; Mead 6-55
15	04 Aug 1902	Hampshire; County Ground, Derby	Drawn		AE Lawton 146; Llewellyn 109 and 5-117
16	07 Aug 1902	Worcestershire; County Ground, New Road, Worcester	Drawn		HK Foster 112; FL Bowley 122; RE Foster 109
17	11 Aug 1902	Nottinghamshire; Trent Bridge, Nottingham	Lost	Innings and 89 runs	Gunn 101; Shrewbury 108; W Bestwick 6-82; Wass 5-84 and 6-53
18	14 Aug 1902	Warwickshire; County Ground, Derby	Won	Innings and 250 runs	CA Ollivierre 167; AE Lawton 126; A Warren 6-33
19	18 Aug 1902	Surrey; North Road Ground, Glossop	Drawn		
20	21 Aug 1902	Essex; County Ground, Leyton	Won	15 runs	Lucas 103; Mead 5-44 and 5-59; A Warren 6-75; W Bestwick 7-55

== Statistics ==
=== County Championship batting averages ===
Name	Matches	Inns	Runs	High score	Average	100s
EM Ashcroft	13	19	843	162	46.83	2
CA Ollivierre	7	9	363	167	40.33	1
G Curgenven	3	5	120	51	30.00	0
AE Lawton	16	22	652	146	29.63	2
LG Wright	16	24	629	101	26.20	1
E Needham	15	22	480	66	24.00	0
W Storer	16	22	474	54	21.54	0
T Forrester	8	12	156	41	19.50	0
JJ Hulme	16	22	329	47	18.27	0
J Humphries	13	19	248	43	17.71	0
Samuel Hill Wood	3	4	52	43	13.00	0
A Warren	14	20	242	71	12.73	0
W Chatterton	7	10	76	32	8.44	0
W Locker	1	1	8	8	8.00	0
H Bagshaw	2	4	28	16	7.00	0
W Bestwick	16	20	83	26	6.38	0
W Sugg	5	7	44	13	6.28	0
B Hall	1	2	10	7	5.00	0
CH Lyon	2	2	6	4	3.00	0
N Buxton	1	2	7	7	3.50	0
AHH Cooper	1	1	0	0	0.00	0

Leading first-class batsmen for Derbyshire by runs scored
Name	Mat	Inns	Runs	HS	Ave	100
EM Ashcroft	15	23	897	162	39.80	2
AE Lawton	19	28	861	149	30.75	3
LG Wright	18	28	736	101	26.29	1
W Storer	19	28	611	61	21.82	0
E Needham	16	24	489	66	20.38	0

(a) Figures adjusted for non CC matches

Outside the County Championship, E Stapleton played against MCC and GD Wilson against London County

=== County Championship bowling averages ===
Name	Balls	Runs	Wickets	BB	Average
W Bestwick	3362	1339	63	7-28	21.25
JJ Hulme	3385	1362	55	7-48	24.76
A Warren	1720	934	38	7-70	24.57
T Forrester	894	360	17	4-38	21.17
AE Lawton	650	335	16	4-59	20.93
W Storer	811	564	15	3-63	37.60
EM Ashcroft	482	272	4	2-46	68.00
W Chatterton	138	80	3	2-40	26.66
N Buxton	42	14	2	2-14	7.00
W Sugg	72	56	2	1-7	28.00
J Humphries	30	19	1	1-19	19.00
CA Ollivierre	54	53	0		
E Needham	42	35	0		
LG Wright	24	25	0		
CH Lyon	12	6	0		
AHH Cooper	12	12	0		
G Curgenven	6	0	0		

Leading first class bowlers for Derbyshire by wickets taken
Name	Balls	Runs	Wkts	BBI	Ave
W Bestwick	4095	1684	81	8-52	20.79
JJ Hulme	3695	1476	66	7-48	22.36
A Warren	2216	1184	49	7-70	24.16
T Forrester	894	360	17	4-38	21.17
AE Lawton	698	385	17	4-59	22.65

== Wicket Keeping ==
- Joe Humphries Catches 41, Stumping 3

== See also ==
- Derbyshire County Cricket Club seasons
- 1902 English cricket season
