= Derbyshire County Cricket Club in 1904 =

1904 season of an English cricket team

Derbyshire County Cricket Club seasons
1904 season
- Captain: Maynard Ashcroft
- County Championship: 10
- Most runs: Charles Ollivierre
- Most wickets: Arnold Warren
- Most catches: Joe Humphries

Derbyshire County Cricket Club in 1904 was the cricket season when the English club Derbyshire had been playing for thirty three years. It was their tenth season in the County Championship and they won five matches to finish tenth in the Championship table.

== 1904 season ==
In addition to eighteen games in the County Championship, Derbyshire played one game against MCC, one against the touring South Africans and two against Grace's London County side. They won seven matches overall. Dr Maynard Ashcroft was in his only season as captain. Charles Ollivierre was top scorer and Arnold Warren took most wickets.

The season saw one of Derbyshire's most accomplished performances - the defeat of Essex by nine wickets at Chesterfield. Essex made 597 in their first innings, P. A. Perrin scoring 343 not out, and looked to be in a commanding position. However Derbyshire replied with 548, Olliviere making 229, and dismissed Essex for 97 in the second innings. Derbyshire lost only one wicket in their second innings for 149, with Olliviere 92 not out and won by nine wickets.

George Stevenson was the only new player in the season and played his only two matches for the club in the year.

=== Matches ===
List of matches
No.	Date	V	Result	Margin	Notes
1	16 May 1904	Surrey; Kennington Oval	Won	122 runs	Lockwood 7-79; W Bestwick 8-103; Hayes 6-48
2	19 May 1904	London County Cricket Club; Crystal Palace Park	Lost	Innings and 31 runs	LG Wright 139; Hathorn 117; Braund 6-40
3	23 May 1904	Hampshire; County Ground, Southampton	Drawn		Hill 111; W Bestwick 5-133
4	26 May 1904	Yorkshire; County Ground, Derby	Drawn		
5	06 Jun 1904	Sussex; County Ground, Hove	Lost	Innings and 65 runs	C. B. Fry 226; EM Ashcroft 111; Relf 5-81
6	09 Jun 1904	MCC; Lord's Cricket Ground, St John's Wood	Won	8 wickets	W Storer 110; Thompson 7-101; W Bestwick 5-31; A Warren 5-23
7	13 Jun 1904	Leicestershire; County Ground, Derby	Lost	6 wickets	Allsopp 5–54
8	16 Jun 1904	Essex; County Ground, Leyton	Won	39 runs	Gillingham 103; SWA Cadman 126; A Warren 5-71 and 6-66
9	20 Jun 1904	Warwickshire; North Road Ground, Glossop	Won	Innings and 24 runs	A Warren 6-66
10	27 Jun 1904	Nottinghamshire; Queen's Park, Chesterfield	Lost	330 runs	James Iremonger 142; Jones 119; W Storer 5-34; Wass 5-103; A Warren 5-56; Gunn 6-19
11	30 Jun 1904	Surrey; County Ground, Derby	Lost	Innings and 103 runs	G Curgenven 124; Hayes 273; Lees 8-66
12	04 Jul 1904	Yorkshire; Bramall Lane, Sheffield	Lost	4 wickets	Haigh 104 and 5-85
13	07 Jul 1904	Leicestershire; Aylestone Road, Leicester	Won	306 runs	LG Wright 140; EM Ashcroft 100; W Bestwick 7-42
14	14 Jul 1904	Lancashire; County Ground, Derby	Lost	Innings and 129 runs	James Hallows 111; Brearley 6-33
15	18 Jul 1904	Essex; Queen's Park, Chesterfield	Won	9 wickets	Perrin 343; CA Ollivierre 229; Bill Reeves 5-192
16	25 Jul 1904	Sussex; County Ground, Derby	Drawn		Vine 169
17	28 Jul 1904	Nottinghamshire; Welbeck Abbey Cricket Ground	Drawn		A Warren 8-69 and 7-43; Wass 6-71
18	01 Aug 1904	Hampshire; County Ground, Derby	Lost	9 wickets	Hesketh-Pritchard 6-68; Baldwin 5-53
19	04 Aug 1904	Warwickshire; Edgbaston, Birmingham	Drawn		LG Wright 131; A Warren 5-47; Santall 5-46
20	08 Aug 1904	London County Cricket Club; Queen's Park, Chesterfield	Won	139 runs	W. G. Grace 6-78; EM Ashcroft 5-18; Coe 5-46
21	15 Aug 1904	South Africans; County Ground, Derby	Drawn		A Warren 5-60
22	25 Aug 1904	Lancashire; Old Trafford, Manchester	Lost	131 runs	Johnny Tyldesley 104; A Warren 6-62

== Statistics ==
=== County Championship batting averages ===
Name	Matches	Inns	Runs	High score	Average	100s
CA Ollivierre	18	31	1099	229	36.63	1
LG Wright	18	31	1074	140	34.64	2
EM Ashcroft	18	29	802	111	29.70	2
W Storer	17	28	647	78	25.88	0
G Curgenven	18	29	691	124	23.82	1
SWA Cadman	18	30	614	126	21.17	1
AE Lawton	5	8	187	80	23.37	0
A Morton	14	22	318	56*	17.66	0
E Needham	12	20	323	72	17.00	0
J Humphries	18	27	287	44	16.88	0
A Warren	18	29	394	55	15.15	0
HF Wright	1	2	20	16	10.00	0
G Green	2	4	30	20	7.50	0
T Forrester	1	1	4	4	4.00	0
GR Gregory	2	2	8	8	4.00	0
W Bestwick	17	25	56	15	3.73	0
GS Stevenson	1	2	1	1	0.50	0

=== County Championship bowling averages ===
Name	Balls	Runs	Wickets	BB	Average
A Warren	3994	2241	101	8-69	22.18
W Bestwick	4099	1951	71	8-103	27.47
SWA Cadman	2815	1225	29	4-48	42.24
W Storer	584	370	17	5-34	21.76
G Curgenven	1001	659	17	3-32	38.76
EM Ashcroft	545	319	8	2-44	39.87
A Morton	307	179	6	3-16	29.83
G Green	258	152	4	2-40	38.00
AE Lawton	276	184	3	1-24	61.33
CA Ollivierre	42	44	1	1-15	44.00
GR Gregory	96	45	0		
T Forrester	60	30	0		
LG Wright	48	44	0		
GS Stevenson	36	13	0		

=== Wicket Keeper ===
- Joe Humphries Catches 34, Stumping 2

== See also ==
- Derbyshire County Cricket Club seasons
- 1904 English cricket season
