= 2004 Republican National Convention protest activity =

- Part of the 2004 United States presidential election and the Opposition to the Iraq War
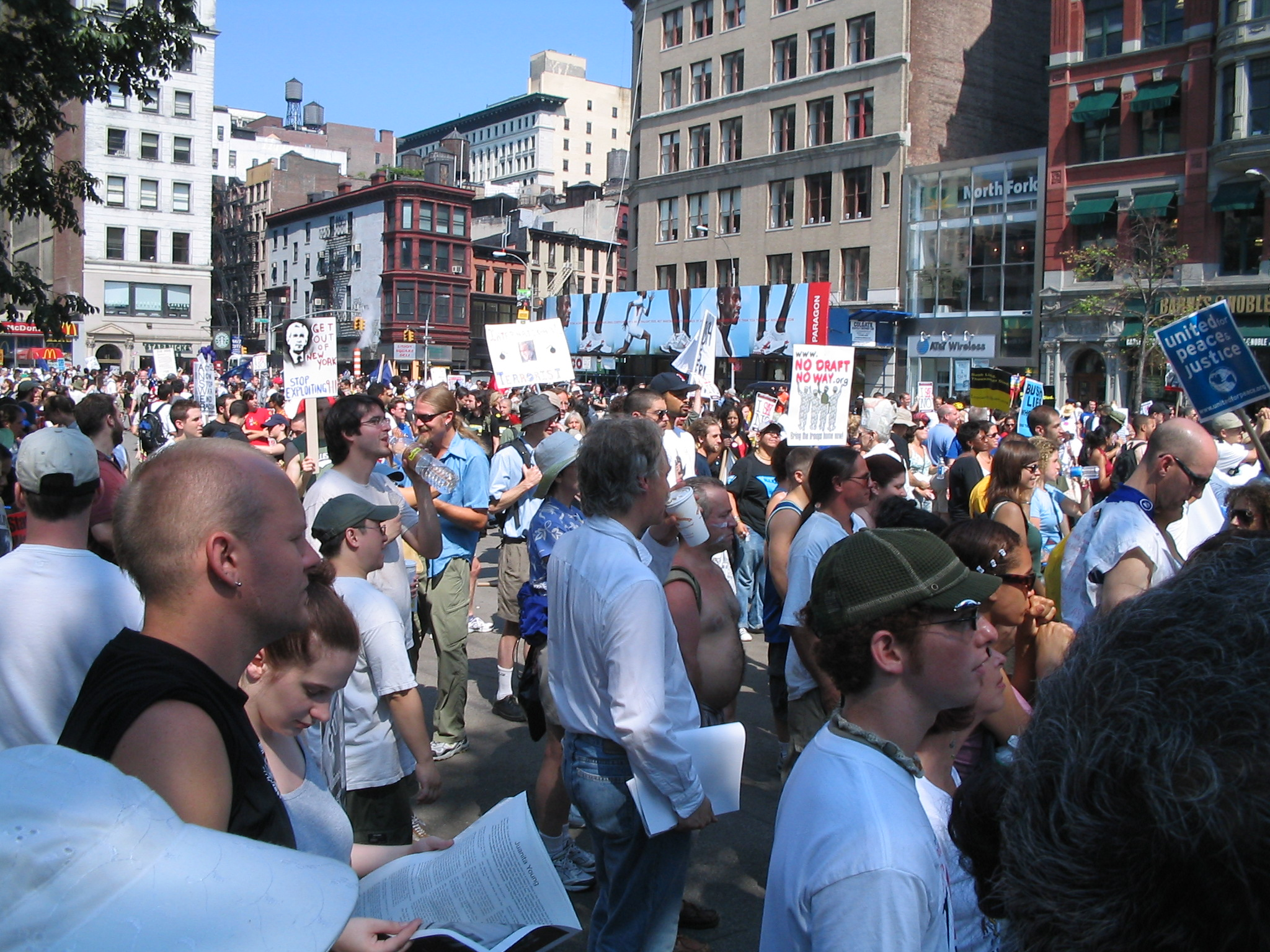
- Protesters gather in Union Square before the march
- Location: New York City, New York
- Caused by: Nomination of George W. Bush

2004 Republican National Convention protest activity includes the broad range of marches, rallies, performances, demonstrations, exhibits, and acts of civil disobedience in New York City to protest the 2004 Republican National Convention and the nomination of President George W. Bush for the 2004 U.S. presidential election.

Hundreds of groups organized protests, including United for Peace and Justice, a coalition of more than 800 anti-war and social justice groups, and International ANSWER. Over 1800 individuals were arrested by the authorities, a record for a political convention in the U.S. However 90% of those charges were eventually dropped.

== Size of protests ==
While Democratic National Conventions had historically attracted more protesters the Republican National Conventions, 2004 marked a shift. Hundreds of thousands of protesters participated in protests of the Republican convention.

== Thursday, August 26 ==
Four young professionals and students, who called themselves Operation Sybil, hung a banner over the front of the Plaza Hotel. Two of them, including Terra Lawson-Remer, rappelled down the front of the hotel, after which they were able to hang the banner more than a dozen stories above the ground. The banner, which measured 60 feet (18 m) wide and roughly three stories high, said "Truth," with an arrow pointing in one direction (toward Central Park, where the United for Peace March was supposed to take place) and "Bush," with an arrow pointing the other direction (toward Madison Square Garden, the site of the convention). The four climbers were quickly arrested and the banner was removed by the police. One police officer was injured in the process when he stepped on a skylight and it broke. As a result of the officer's injury, the climbers were charged with assault of a police officer along with their other charges.

Twelve AIDS activists from the AIDS Coalition to Unleash Power (ACT UP) staged a naked protest in front of Madison Square Garden, demanding debt cancellation for poor countries. They took their clothes off in the crosswalk, stopping traffic, as they joined hands and began chanting "Bush, Stop AIDS. Drop the Debt Now!" "Drop the Debt" and "Stop AIDS" were stenciled in black paint on their chests and backs. Their intent was to tell "the naked truth" about Bush's global AIDS policies – that they are inadequate, and that debt cancellation must be a top priority.

Seven of the protesters were completely naked, three were semi-clothed, and two others, who stood off to the side, were fully clothed, and held a large banner that read "W: Drop the Debt. Stop AIDS." The two clothed activists climbed on top of a nearby trailer to make the banner more visible. They were later arrested and faced several charges, including endangerment of a police officer, which was a result of the fact that officers had to climb on top of the trailer, which was a generator, in order to arrest them.

Although there were several times as many police officers as there were protesters on the scene, it was seventeen minutes before the activists were arrested. They were represented by Ron Kuby, and all of the charges were later dropped. A few protesters who were semi-clothed were not arrested, and faced no charges.

The activists later became one of the subjects in photographer Richard Avedon's last project, published in the New Yorker.

== Friday, August 27 ==
Between 5,000 and 6,000 participants took part in the Critical Mass bicycle ride. The monthly NYC Critical Mass ride promoted by the environmental group Time's Up! occurs on the last Friday of each month and prior to this ride had usually attracted about 1,500 riders. Police eventually blockaded roads and arrested 264 people in relation to that event. Most of them were charged with disorderly conduct and held in custody for up to 72 hours. This was the first time the NYPD had made any significant arrests of Critical Mass participants in New York City.

== Sunday, August 29 ==
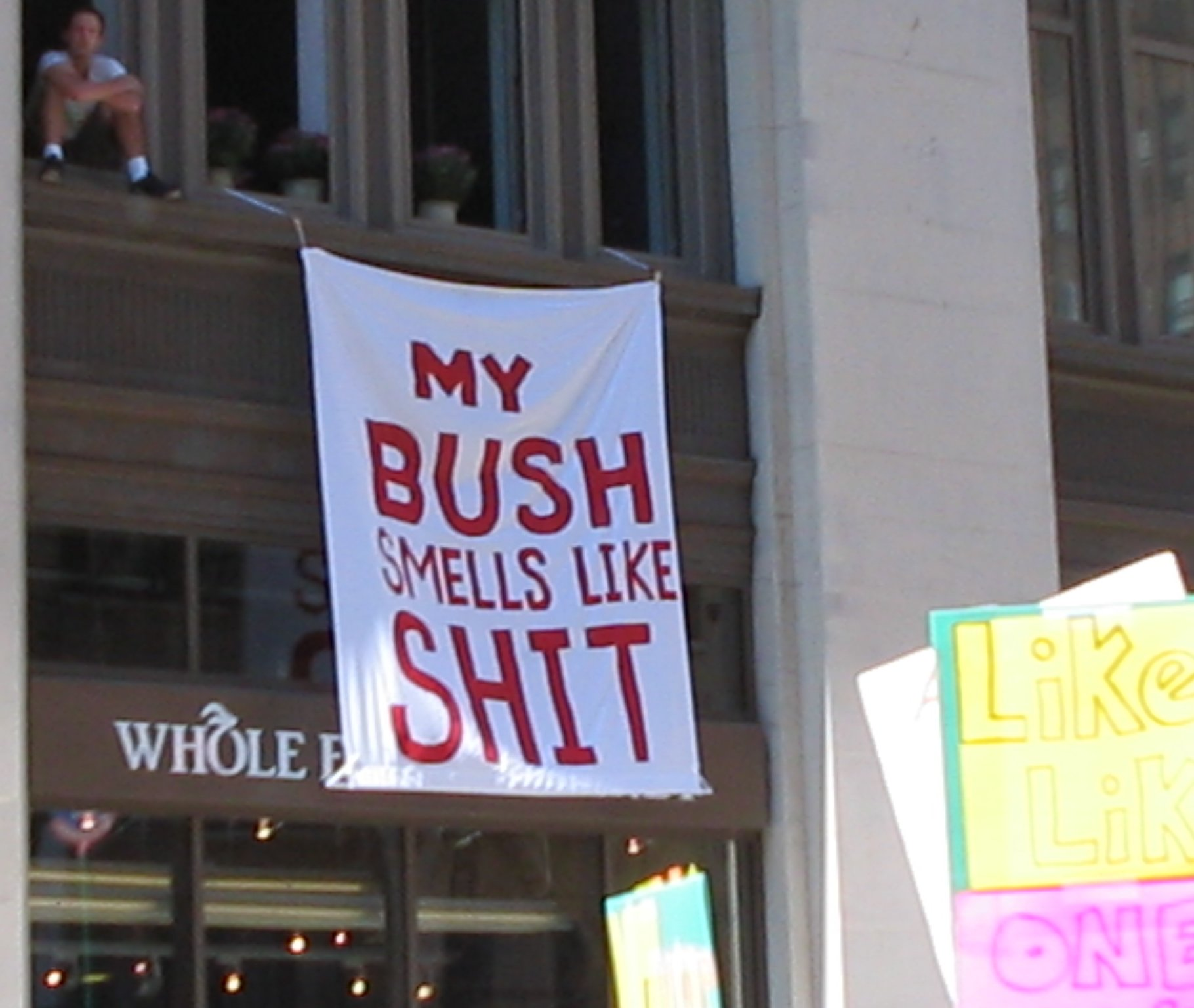
Many protesters showed solidarity with the marchers

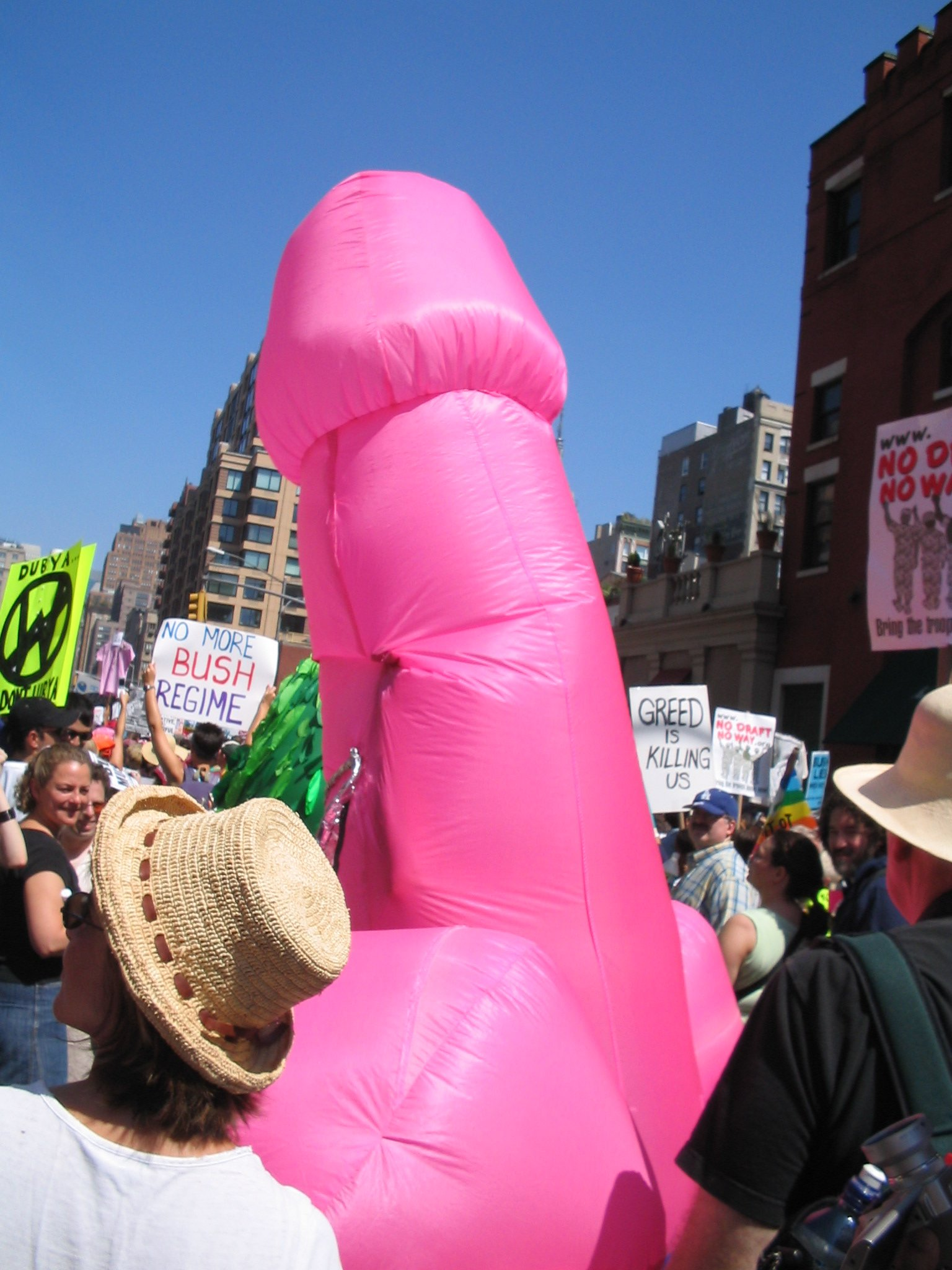
Visual pun effigies of Dick Cheney and George W. Bush at the march

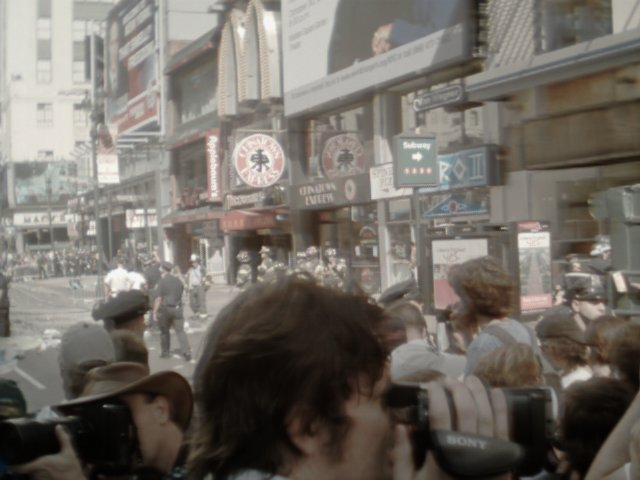
Police and fire officers stand amidst debris following the torching of a dragon float

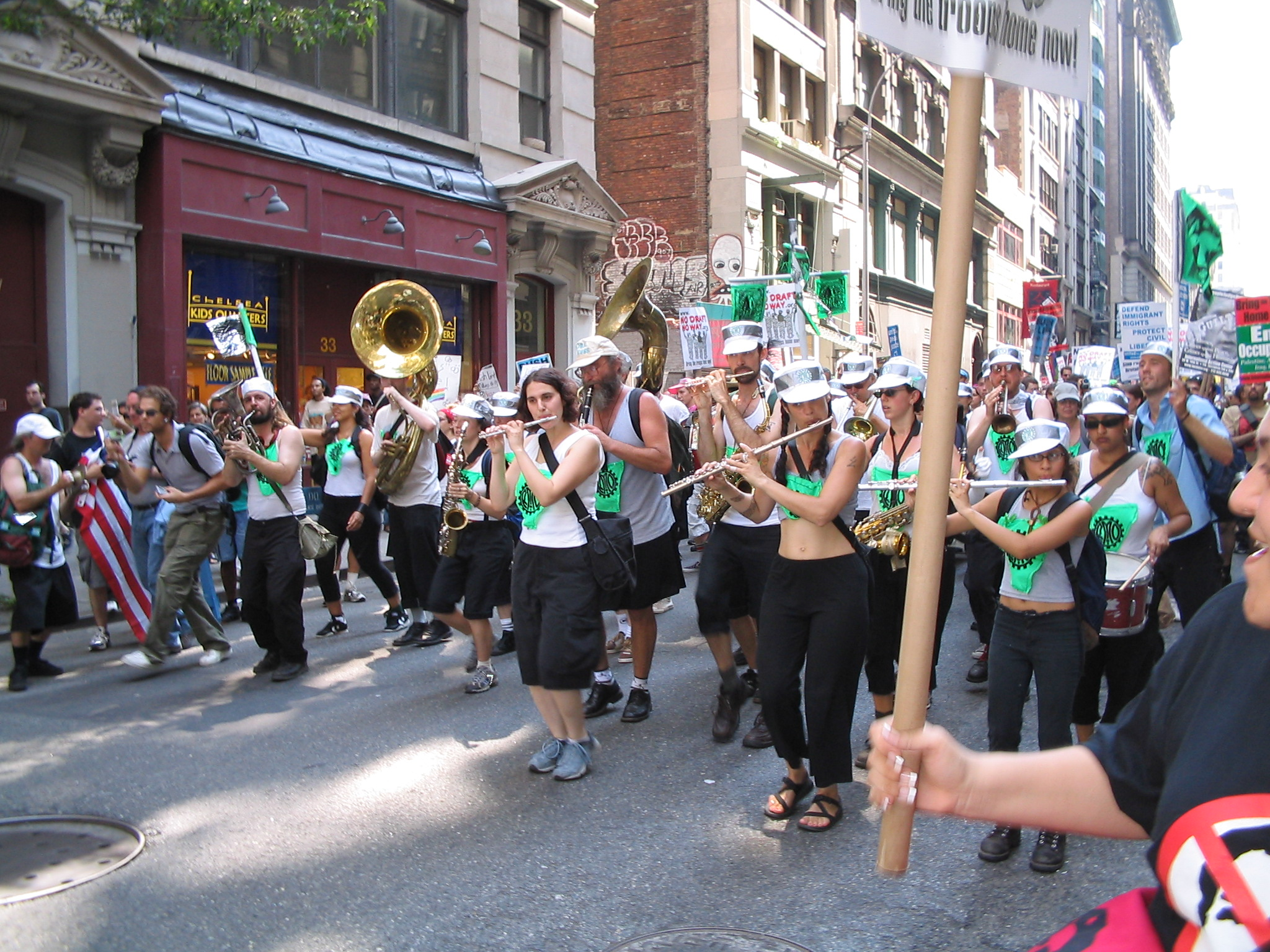
Radical drum corps and marching bands, such as the Rude Mechanical Orchestra shown here, were a common sight

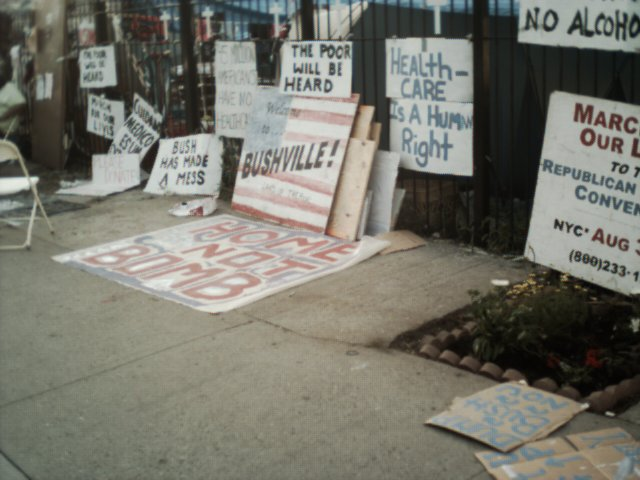
Signs outside the mobile Bushville in Brooklyn

United for Peace and Justice organized the main march of the week, one of the largest protests in U.S. history, in which protesters marched past Madison Square Garden, the site of the convention. The march included hundreds of separate contingents as well as individual marchers. One Thousand Coffins, a nationwide group of citizens, veterans and clergy, held a procession of one thousand full-scale flag-draped coffins commemorating the fallen troops. Several hundred members of Billionaires for Bush held a mock countermarch. Estimates of crowd size ranged from 120,000 (unnamed police spokesman) to over 500,000 (organizers, second unnamed police source). In March, 2007 NYPD Deputy Commissioner Paul Browne stated about the RNC protests: "You certainly had 800,000 on August 29."

Organizers held a pre-march press conference in front of thousands on 7th Avenue. Several people spoke in opposition to the war in Iraq and Bush administration policies including Michael Moore, Jesse Jackson, Congressman Charles Rangel, and a father who had lost his son in Iraq. The whole event lasted six hours, with the lead contingent finishing the march long before thousands of people could even move from the starting point. The City government, under Republican Mayor Michael Bloomberg, had earlier denied the protesters a permit to hold a rally in Central Park following the march, citing concern for the park's grass. The West Side Highway was offered instead, but organizers refused, citing exorbitant costs for the extra sound equipment and problems for the location. Organizers encouraged people to go to Central Park following the march's conclusion in Union Square. Disturbances were minor, as New York Commissioner Raymond W. Kelly reported about 200 arrests with 9 felonies, most of them occurring after the march had concluded. Incidentally, this was also the day when the Protest Warrior and Communists for Kerry counter-protest groups held their main counter-demonstrations in support of Bush and the RNC.

For the most part, the march proceeded peacefully and without violence. The only major incident during the march occurred when some individuals of unknown affiliations torched a large dragon float between Madison Square Garden and the Fox News building. The float turned into a huge fireball, and the march was halted until firefighters were able to clear the street of debris. Later, there was a minor scuffle as some individuals tried to take some of the Protest Warriors' signs. There were isolated incidents of violent attacks against delegates according to Randal C. Archibold, writer from the New York Times. In his article, "Protesters' Encounters With Delegates on the Town Turn Ugly," he discussed events that occurred in around the theater district, including one incident outside "The Lion King" on 42nd Street, in which a delegate is punched in the face by a protester running by.

== Monday, August 30 ==
Still We Rise, a coalition of 52 NYC-based community organizations for the poor and people of color, marched at noon from Union Square to Madison Square Garden, and held a rally by the Garden.

At 4 PM, the Poor People's Economic Human Rights Campaign, a national campaign involving over sixty organizations, held a rally by the United Nations on the Dag Hammarskjold Plaza. Along with many homeless and poor people who have been marching with the PPEHRC through New Jersey and living in a "mobile Bushville" (which settled in Brooklyn a week before the convention), thousands thronged the streets despite having been denied a permit and marched down Second Avenue and up Eighth Avenue to Madison Square Garden, the police having decided not to stop the protesters. A few troublemakers apparently acting alone disrupted the march towards the end by tearing open police barricades, with one person attacking a plainclothes police detective who had driven his scooter into the crowd (see note below), knocking him unconscious. Police made several arrests and deployed tear gas.

There is considerable dispute involving this incident, as many eyewitnesses said they had no idea this was a policeman, who intentionally rammed his motorcycle straight into a dense crowd, hitting and injuring people, which started the altercation. One source said: "The divide and arrest tactics used by the police in the march have been seen in the past several days in New York here, and as have the use of undercover officers, mopeds and motorcycles." Another source stated: "Eyewitness reports confirmed that an undercover police officer in a scooter rammed his way into the throngs of protesters, driving as fast as 20 miles an hour, as the police were splitting the crowd, before being knocked off and beaten by an angry demonstrator. 'What kind of person would ram into dozens of people in a scooter with a line of police behind him?' asked protester Gonzalo Hereda afterwards in disbelief."

== Tuesday, August 31 ==
A group called the A31 Action Coalition called for massive civil disobedience on Tuesday, August 31.

Members of CODEPINK and others gathered in front of Fox News Channel's headquarters in New York City and held a "Fox News Shut-Up-A-Thon." About 1,000 people protested the network, complaining about lack of balance and deriding it as a propaganda arm of the Republican Party.

Most of the protesters from the War Resisters League didn't get very far from the World Trade Center on their 3-mile procession to the RNC convention at Madison Square Garden. They crossed one block and 227 of them were instantly surrounded by police and arrested. The several hundred remaining in the WRL contingent proceeded up a different route and got closer to the convention, and did a "die-in" in the street where 54 more were arrested.

== Protest from within the convention ==
Throughout the convention, there were several protesters who were able to sneak into Madison Square Garden and disrupt the speakers at the podium. Some even described it as surprisingly easy. Anti-war activists from CODEPINK disrupted primetime addresses three nights in a row and twice during George W. Bush's acceptance speech. The father of one of the first U.S. servicemen killed in Iraq was ejected after holding up a sign that read "Bush Lied. My Son Died."

Eleven AIDS activists from ACT UP also infiltrated the convention center during the Republican Youth Convention, chanting anti-Bush slogans and disrupting the event. One female protester holding a sign was subdued by security, and alleged that she was kicked by a member of the Young Republicans while she was on the ground. Video of this event was shot by a local news station, but it proved to be inconclusive, because while it showed the Republican making kicking motions, it didn't show that any contact was made. News of the alleged attack spread through the blogosphere, leading a website to identify a person who they believed was the alleged attacker. The female protester who was kicked then came forward and said she would consider pressing charges; however, she later decided that it was more worthwhile to expend her energy fighting AIDS. The identity of the alleged attacker has not been conclusively confirmed. The eleven ACT UP protesters were charged with disorderly conduct, 2nd and 3rd degree assault, and inciting a riot (1 violation, 1 misdemeanor, and 2 felonies), although all of the charges were dropped. A twelfth individual, not associated with ACT UP, was also arrested with them for taking pictures of the action.

== Controversial police tactics ==
Concerns have been raised about police tactics in arresting nonviolent protesters with many apparently innocent people being swept up in mass arrests. For instance, a lawyer, along with 1,000 other people, was detained in a facility by the New York City Police Department in such conditions that he said that the city had created its "own little Guantanamo on the Hudson", referring to the tortures reported in prisoners camps in Guantanamo Bay. The police closed a street adjoining Union Square where protesters were marching, arresting protesters and bystanders alike. People were required to show identification cards or face arrest; the arrested people were not immediately informed of charges against them.

The facility was the then-recently closed Hudson Pier Depot at Pier 57 on the Hudson River, a three-story, block-long pier that has been converted into a temporary prison, though unfit for detention of prisoners. Arrested protesters have complained about extremely poor conditions describing it as overcrowded, dirty, and contaminated with oil and asbestos. People reported having suffered from smell, bad ventilation, and even chemical burns and rashes.

On May 17, 2006 Amy Goodman, host of Democracy Now!, reported on the FBI launch of a criminal civil rights investigation of NYPD after Gulf War veteran Dennis Kyne went to trial and had all charges dropped due to video evidence showing the police falsified reports and sworn testimony.

In 2014, the city settled the lawsuits. $6.4 million was paid to 430 individual plaintiffs. $6.6 million was paid to settle a class-action lawsuit filed by 1,200 additional people. The legal fees were $5 million. The city did not admit any wrongdoing. One of the plaintiffs, artist Constantina Zavistanos, has incorporated her settlement into the art work "Sweepstakes" where viewers are given a portion of the settlement.

Numerous cases were reported, notably:

- A 15-year-old diabetic girl on her way to a movie was arrested.
- A former vice president of Morgan Stanley was arrested while riding her bicycle.
- A 16-year-old protester was lost to her mother for two days, even though her mother knew about and supported her daughter's participation.
- One of the most prominent personalities arrested was Eric Corley "Emmanuel Goldstein", an important advocate of public rights and independent media, and editor of 2600: The Hacker Quarterly.
- Small pens were used to contain "30 to 40 people" at once.
- Many people were detained longer than 24 hours on relatively trivial charges. One was a 23-year-old Montreal student arrested for disorderly conduct and released three days later. "He says he spent a total of 57 hours between the pier and Central Booking, during which time he says he was moved 14 times and repeatedly handcuffed and shackled to other protesters as young as 15."

The New York Times has also reported on two occasions that the police videotaped and infiltrated protests, as well as acting as agents provocateurs during the protests. In addition, the New York Times reported that prior to the protests, NYPD officers traveled as far away as Europe and spied on people there who planned to protest at the RNC.

The City reportedly refused to release the prisoners until a judge threatened to fine it for every extra hour every prisoner would spend in prison. The victims of the arrests have filed lawsuits against the City of New York. Several cases have since gone to court, and it has come out that the charges of resisting arrest in those cases were completely fabricated. Video evidence was shown of defendants complying peaceably with police demands. Many of the cases have since been summarily dismissed. Some of them, as of 2011, however, remain open and are expected to proceed to trial.

== See also ==
- The After Party: The Last Party 3, a documentary film about the mass arrests
- Free speech zone
- List of demonstrations against corporate globalization
