= George Stevenson (cricketer) =

English cricketer

Personal information
- Born: 20 July 1876; Derby, England
- Died: 25 July 1938 (aged 62); Fritchley, Derbyshire, England
- Batting: Left-handed
- Bowling: Left-arm fast-medium

Domestic team information
- Years: Team
- 1904: Derbyshire
- FC debut: 19 May 1904 Derbyshire v London County
- Last FC: 16 June 1904 Derbyshire v Essex

Career statistics
Competition	First-class
Matches	2
Runs scored	10
Batting average	2.50
100s/50s	0/0
Top score	9
Balls bowled	138
Wickets	1
Bowling average	92.00
5 wickets in innings	0
10 wickets in match	0
Best bowling	1/79
Catches/stumpings	1/–
- Source: CricketArchive, June 2012

George Stevenson should not be confused with Bob Stephenson, real name George Stephenson, former Derbyshire and Hampshire cricketer.

George Stanley Stevenson (20 July 1876 – 25 July 1938) was an English cricketer who played first-class cricket for Derbyshire in 1904.

Stevenson was born in Derby, the son of James Henry Stevenson, an ironmonger, and his wife Elizabeth. He made his debut for Derbyshire in the 1904 season in a first-class match in May against London County captained by WG Grace. In the match, he made his top score of 9 and took a wicket. Stevenson's only County Championship match came against Essex a month later, in which he bowled economically without taking a wicket and made zero and 1 from the tailend.

Stevenson was a left-handed batsman who played 4 innings in 2 first-class matches with an average of 2.50 and a top score of 9. He was a left-arm fast-medium bowler and took 1 first-class wicket at an average of 92.00.

Stevenson died in Fritchley, Derbyshire at the age of 62.
