= Bert Hall (cricketer) =

English cricketer

Bert Hall was an English cricketer who played first-class cricket for Derbyshire in 1902.

Hall represented Derbyshire during the 1902 season in one match against Hampshire, a 180-run victory in which Hall put on ten runs in the two innings in which he played.
