= Noah Buxton =

English cricketer

Personal information
- Born: 6 November 1876; Codnor, Derbyshire, England
- Died: 26 May 1967 (aged 90); Pontefract, Yorkshire, England
- Batting: Right-handed
- Bowling: Right-arm medium-fast
- Relatives: Joseph Buxton (nephew)

Domestic team information
- Years: Team
- 1902–1911: Derbyshire
- FC debut: 9 June 1902 Derbyshire v Warwickshire
- Last FC: 24 July 1911 Derbyshire v Surrey

Career statistics
Competition	First-class
Matches	7
Runs scored	40
Batting average	3.33
100s/50s	0/0
Top score	7
Balls bowled	312
Wickets	5
Bowling average	34.20
5 wickets in innings	0
10 wickets in match	0
Best bowling	2/14
Catches/stumpings	1/–
- Source: CricketArchive, October 2011

Noah Buxton (6 November 1876 – 26 May 1967) was an English cricketer who played first-class cricket for Derbyshire between 1902 and 1911.

Buxton was born at Codnor, Derbyshire, the son of William Buxton, a coal miner, and his wife Mary. In 1881 the family was living at Kirkby in Ashfield, Nottinghamshire. Buxton made his debut for Derbyshire in the 1902 season. In his opening match against Warwickshire in June, he achieved his best bowling performance of 2 for 14. He played four more matches for Derbyshire during the 1902 season. In 1905, he played for Staffordshire in a Minor Counties match and reappeared for Derbyshire for one match in the 1907 season. In 1909 he was playing minor counties cricket for Cheshire but put in two appearances for Derbyshire in the 1911 season.

Buxton was a right-hand batsman and played 14 innings in 7 first-class matches with an average of 3.33 and a top score of 7. He was a right-arm fast-medium bowler and took five first-class wickets at an average of 34.2 and a best performance of 2 for 14.

Buxton died at Pontefract, Yorkshire at the age of 90. His nephew Joseph Buxton played cricket for Nottinghamshire in 1937.
