= Charles Lyon (British Army officer) =

English soldier and cricketer

Brigadier-General Charles Lyon CB CMG DSO
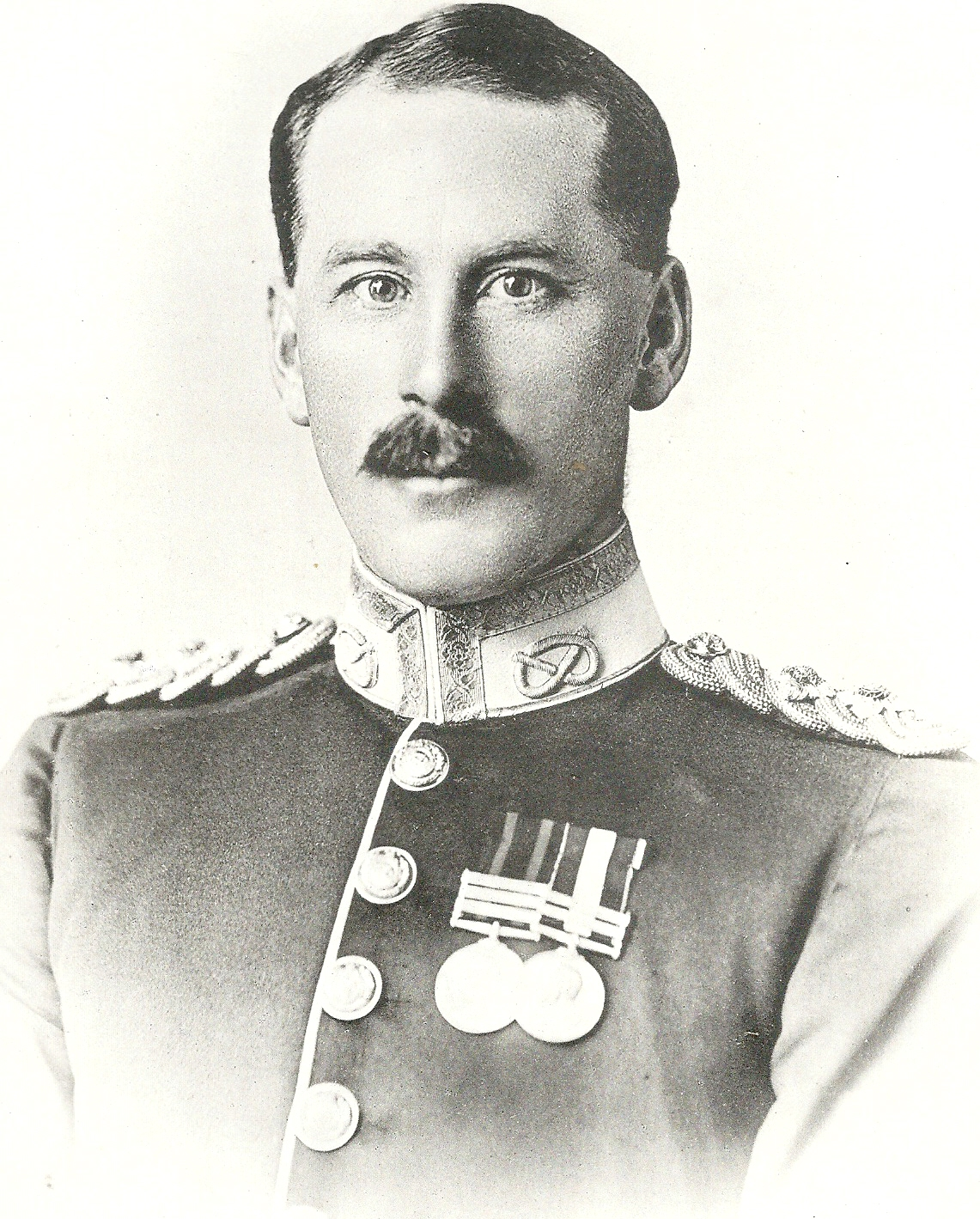
- Lyon pictured in India in 1908
- Born: 18 March 1878; Rocester, Staffordshire, England
- Died: 3 December 1959 (aged 81); Ightfield, Shropshire, England
- Military career
- Allegiance: United Kingdom
- Branch: British Army
- Service years: 1900–1933
- Rank: Brigadier-General
- Unit: North Staffordshire Regiment
- Conflicts: Second Boer War; World War I
- Awards: Companion of the Order of the Bath; Companion of the Order of St Michael and St George; Distinguished Service Order; Mentioned in dispatches
- Other work: Land Tax Commissioner

Brigadier-General Charles Harry Lyon CB CMG DSO (18 March 1878 – 3 December 1959) was a British Army officer who also played first-class cricket for Derbyshire in 1902.

== Early life ==
Lyon was born at The Lodge, Rocester, Staffordshire, the eldest son of Charles William Lyon and his wife Florence. His father was a cotton manufacturer who ran a mill at Rocester and was a Justice of the Peace.

== Military career ==
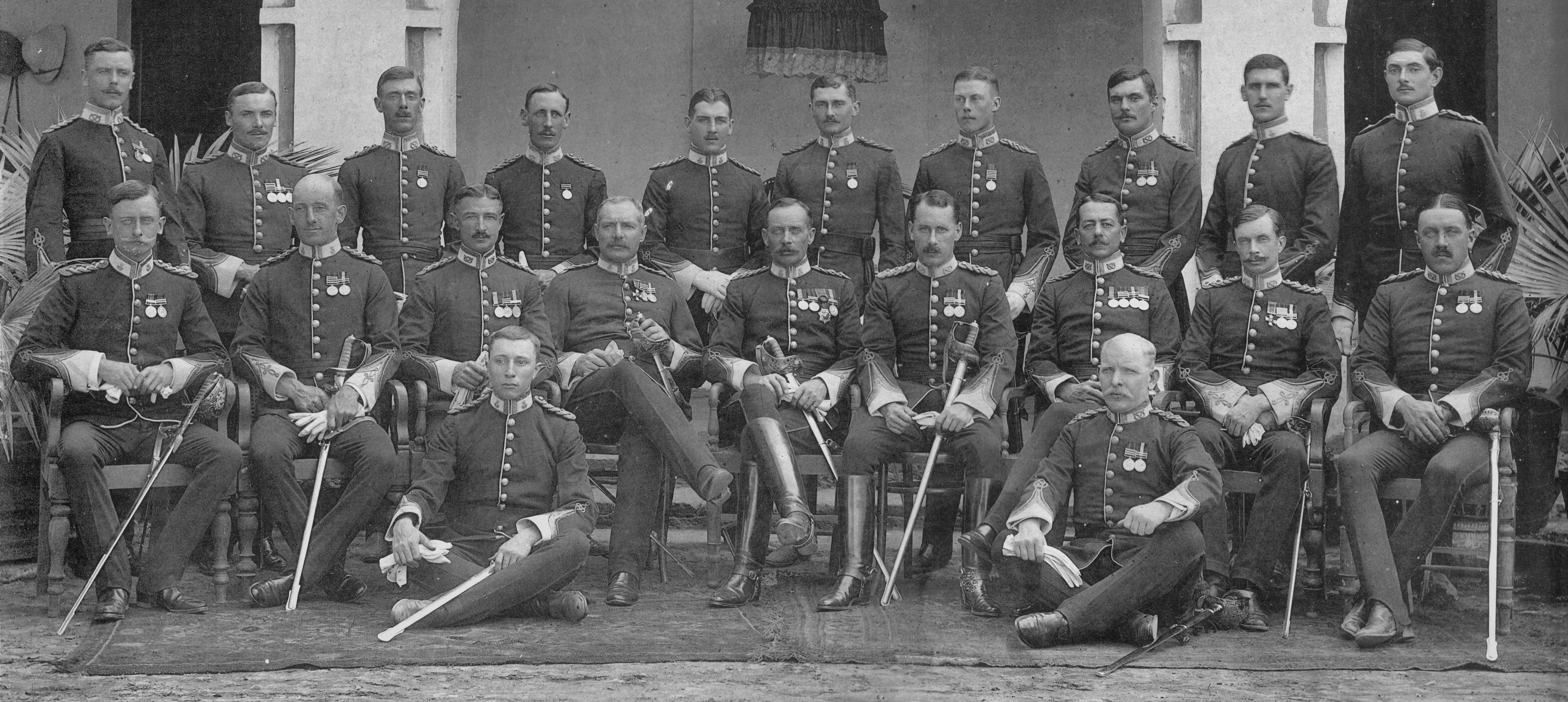
Officers of the 2nd Battalion, North Staffordshire Regiment outside the officers' mess in Multan, India, 1908. Lieutenant Lyon, then the battalion's adjutant, is sitting fourth from the right, next to Lieutenant Colonel Henry Marwood, the battalion's commander, in the centre.

Lyon was commissioned as a second lieutenant into the 4th (Extra Reserve) Battalion, the North Staffordshire Regiment in February 1900, but two months later, in April of the same year, transferred to the 2nd Battalion of the regiment. The 2nd Battalion was a regular battalion and was at the time on active service in South Africa during the Second Boer War, where Lyon joined the battalion and served with it throughout the war, being mentioned in dispatches in 1901. He was promoted to lieutenant on 19 January 1901, while in South Africa. After peace was declared in May 1902, Lyon left Cape Town on board the SS Bavarian and arrived in the United Kingdom the following month. He remained with the 2nd Battalion when it was posted to India in 1903 where he became adjutant, in 1906, and was promoted to captain in 1909.

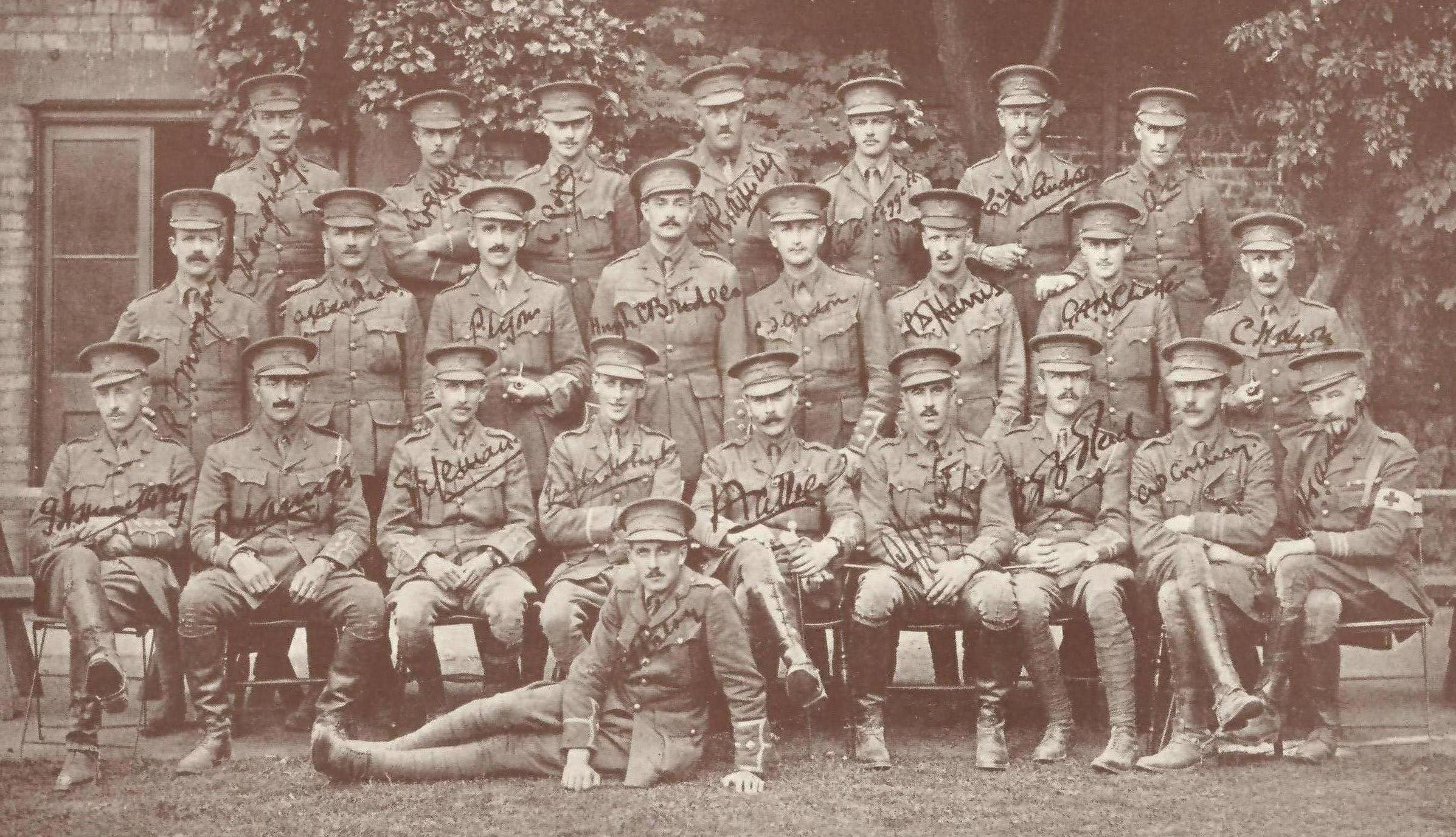
Officers of the 1st Battalion, North Staffordshire Regiment, photographed in Cambridge, August 1914. Captain Charles Lyon is pictured standing on the far right in the second row.

In 1912 Lyon was seconded as a student to the Staff College, Camberley Upon leaving the Staff College, Lyon was posted to the 1st Battalion, North Staffords which was then serving in Ireland; and he was still with it at the outbreak of the First World War in mid-1914. The battalion mobilised in August 1914 and went to France in September, but Lyon only remained with it for another month, until October 1914, when he was attached to the general staff as a staff captain. This was the first of many staff posts that he held until the end of his career, and he never returned to regimental duty. In March 1915 he moved to become a deputy assistant quartermaster general, and by the end of the war held the substantive rank of major, the brevet rank of lieutenant colonel and the temporary rank of brigadier-general. He was awarded the Distinguished Service Order (DSO) in the New Year's Honours List for 1916, appointed a Companion of the Order of St Michael and St George (CMG) in January 1918, and made a Companion of the Order of the Bath; as well as two Belgian decorations, being made an Officier de l'Ordre de la Couronne and receiving the Croix de guerre.

Post-war, Lyon served as Assistant Director of Quartering at the War Office. He finished his army career as assistant quarter master general, retiring on half pay in March 1927 with the honorary rank of brigadier general.

== Cricketing career ==
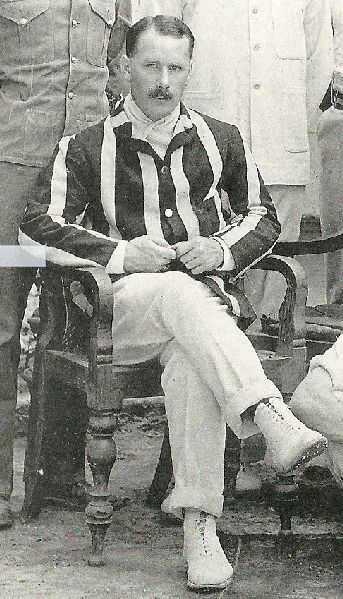
Charles Lyon seated wearing cricket flannels and a blazer. Picture taken in India in 1908.

Between his return from South Africa and his departure for India Lyon played two first-class cricket matches for Derbyshire in the 1902 season. The first was in a match against Worcestershire, which resulted in a draw. Less than a week later, Lyon made his only other first-class appearance, against Nottinghamshire. He was a right-handed batsman and made six runs in his two matches. He bowled two overs without taking a wicket.

After the First World War, he played for the Free Foresters Cricket Club.

== Personal life ==
Lyon married Gwenlliam Mary Campbell, a member of the Minton pottery family. The couple had one daughter, Frances Mary Lyon. After his retirement from the Army Lyon settled in Ightfield, Shropshire, and became a Land Tax Commissioner for the county. He died at Ightfield in 1959, leaving an endowment, the Charles Harry Lyon Endowment, managed by the charity Ightfield with Calverhall Village Hall and Playing Field, to manage the land and buildings held by the committee for the villagers, clubs and wider community of Ightfield.
