= Ernest Stapleton =

English cricketer

Personal information
- Born: 15 January 1869; New Basford, Nottinghamshire, England
- Died: 14 December 1938 (aged 69); Nottingham, England
- Batting: Right-handed

Domestic team information
- Years: Team
- 1902: Derbyshire
- Only FC: 23 June 1902 Derbyshire v MCC

Career statistics
Competition	First-class
Matches	1
Runs scored	3
Batting average	1.50
100s/50s	0/0
Top score	2
Catches/stumpings	0/–
- Source: CricketArchive, May 2012

Ernest Stapleton (15 January 1869 — 14 December 1938) was an English cricketer who played first-class cricket for Derbyshire in 1902.

Stapleton was born in New Basford, Nottinghamshire, the son of Ernest Stapleton, a hose trimmer, and his wife Sarah.

Stapleton made a cricketing appearance for the Nottinghamshire Colts against the Yorkshire Colts in 1896. He played in his first and only first-class match for Derbyshire in the 1902 season in a match in June against Marylebone Cricket Club. Stapleton, as an opening batsman, made just one run in the first innings and just two runs in the second. He was a right-handed batsman and played just that one match with a first-class run total of 3.

Stapleton made no further first-class appearances but in 1909 played one match for Glamorgan in the Minor Counties Championship.

Stapleton died in Nottingham. His brothers-in-law, John and George Gunn played Test cricket for England, while his nephew, also named George Gunn played for Nottinghamshire for 22 years.
