= Joseph Buxton =

English cricketer

Personal information
- Full name: Joseph Herbert Buxton
- Born: 20 November 1912; Kirkby-in-Ashfield, Nottinghamshire, England
- Died: 10 February 1992 (aged 79); Mansfield, Nottinghamshire, England
- Batting: Right-handed
- Bowling: Right-arm fast-medium
- Relatives: Noah Buxton (nephew)

Domestic team information
- Years: Team
- 1937: Nottinghamshire

Career statistics
Competition	First-class
Matches	1
Runs scored	6
Batting average	6.00
100s/50s	0/0
Top score	6
Balls bowled	174
Wickets	1
Bowling average	90.00
5 wickets in innings	0
10 wickets in match	0
Best bowling	1/54
Catches/stumpings	2/–
- Source: Cricinfo, 19 May 2012

Joseph Herbert Buxton (20 November 1912 – 10 February 1992) was an English cricketer. Buxton was a right-handed batsman who bowled right-arm fast-medium. He was born at Kirkby-in-Ashfield, Nottinghamshire.

Buxton made a single first-class appearance for Nottinghamshire against Gloucestershire at Trent Bridge in the 1937 County Championship. Batting first, Nottinghamshire made 396 all out, with Buxton the last man out when he was dismissed by Reg Sinfield for 6 runs. In response, Gloucestershire were dismissed for 350, with Buxton taking the wicket of Charlie Barnett to finish with figures of 1/54 from eighteen overs. Nottinghamshire declared their second-innings on 204/4, with Buxton not required to bat. Gloucestershire reached 107/2 in their second-innings, in which Buxton bowled eleven wicketless overs. The match ended in a draw. This was his only major appearance for the county.

He died at Mansfield, Nottinghamshire, on 10 February 1992. His uncle, Noah Buxton, was also a first-class cricketer.
