= Harold Wild =

English cricketer (1891–1977)

Personal information
- Born: 3 February 1891; Hadfield, Derbyshire, England
- Died: 8 August 1977 (aged 86); Glossop, England
- Batting: Right-handed
- Bowling: Right-arm medium

Domestic team information
- Years: Team
- 1913–1920: Derbyshire
- FC debut: 28 June 1913 Derbyshire v Leicestershire
- Last FC: 14 August 1920 Derbyshire v Essex

Career statistics
Competition	First-class
Matches	32
Runs scored	628
Batting average	12.07
100s/50s	0/2
Top score	68
Balls bowled	252
Wickets	2
Bowling average	64.50
5 wickets in innings	0
10 wickets in match	0
Best bowling	1/3
Catches/stumpings	29/–
- Source: CricketArchive, January 2012

Harold Wild (3 February 1891 – 8 August 1977) was an English cricketer who played first-class cricket for Derbyshire between 1913 and 1920.

Wild was born at Hadfield, Derbyshire. He made his debut for Derbyshire in the 1913 season against Leicestershire in June when he took a wicket and scored 8 and 9. He played two more games in 1913 and a series in the 1914 season. After the First World War, Wild returned to play a full season in 1919 and made his highest score of 68 against Warwickshire at Edgbaston. Wild alternated between opening the batting and playing in the middle order. In his last game in the 1920 season against Essex he was opening batsman and scored in lower double figures.

Right-handed batter Wild participated in 32 first-class games for 59 innings with an average of 12.07 and a highest score of 68. He was a right-arm medium pace bowler and took 2 first-class wickets at an average of 64.50.

Wild died at Glossop, Derbyshire at the age of 86.
