= Guy Wilson (cricketer) =

English cricketer

Personal information
- Full name: Guy Denis Wilson
- Born: 30 November 1882; Melbourne, Derbyshire, England
- Died: 30 November 1917 (aged 35); Cambrai, France

Domestic team information
- Years: Team
- 1902–1905: Derbyshire
- FC debut: 26 June 1902 Derbyshire v London County
- Last FC: 17 July 1905 Derbyshire v MCC

Career statistics
Competition	First-class
Matches	2
Runs scored	19
Batting average	4.75
100s/50s	0/0
Top score	19
Balls bowled	35
Wickets	0
Bowling average	–
5 wickets in innings	–
10 wickets in match	–
Best bowling	–
Catches/stumpings	0/–
- Source: CricketArchive, April 2012

Guy Denis Wilson (30 November 1882 – 30 November 1917) was an English cricketer who played for Derbyshire in 1902 and 1905. He was killed in action during the First World War.

Wilson was born in Melbourne, Derbyshire, the son of Arthur Wilson MA JP. He was educated at Derby School where he captained the cricket and football XI, was an all-round athlete, and was a captain in the Cadet Corps in 1900/1901. He played one first-class match for Derbyshire in the 1902 season against W.G.Grace's London County but made little impact in the match. His second game came in the 1905 season against Marylebone Cricket Club (MCC) when again he made little impression. He played 4 innings in 2 first-class matches with an average of 4.75 and a top score of 9. He took no wickets in the six overs he bowled.

In 1908 Wilson was commissioned into the 1st Derbyshire Howitzer Battery of the Territorial Force as a Second lieutenant. He saw active service in the First World War, becoming a captain in the Royal Field Artillery. He was killed in France on his 35th birthday during the Battle of Cambrai of 1917.
