= George Gregory (cricketer) =

English cricketer

Personal information
- Full name: George Robert Gregory
- Born: 27 August 1878; Pilsley, Derbyshire, England
- Died: 28 November 1958 (aged 80); Scarborough, England
- Batting: Right-handed
- Bowling: Leg break

Domestic team information
- Years: Team
- 1899–1910: Derbyshire
- FC debut: 20 July 1899 Derbyshire v Leicestershire
- Last FC: 18 August 1910 Derbyshire v Nottinghamshire

Career statistics
Competition	First-class
Matches	15
Runs scored	174
Batting average	8.70
100s/50s	0/0
Top score	23
Balls bowled	414
Wickets	12
Bowling average	22.25
5 wickets in innings	0
10 wickets in match	0
Best bowling	4/70
Catches/stumpings	5/–
- Source: CricketArchive, November 2011

George Robert Gregory (27 August 1878 – 28 November 1958) was an English first-class cricketer who played for Derbyshire intermittently between 1899 and 1910.

Gregory was born at Pilsley, Derbyshire, the son of George Gregory, an innkeeper of Pilsley, and his wife Mary. He made his debut for Derbyshire in the 1899 season in July against Leicestershire when he opened the batting in the only innings played. He next played for Derbyshire in two games in the 1901 season. His main season was in 1903 when he played eight matches and bowled regularly to take 12 wickets. His best bowling performance of 4 for 70 was against Surrey. In the 1904 season he played two matches, and then his next game was in the 1906 season. He finally played one match in the 1910 season.

Gregory was a right-hand batsman and played 22 innings in 15 first-class matches with an average of 8.70 and a top score of 23. He was a leg-break bowler and took twelve first-class wickets at an average of 22.25 and a best performance of 4-70.

Gregory died at Scarborough, Yorkshire at the age of 80.
