= John Bullough (businessman) =

British racing driver (1969–2023)

Captain The Much Honoured The Baron of Culcreuch MBE
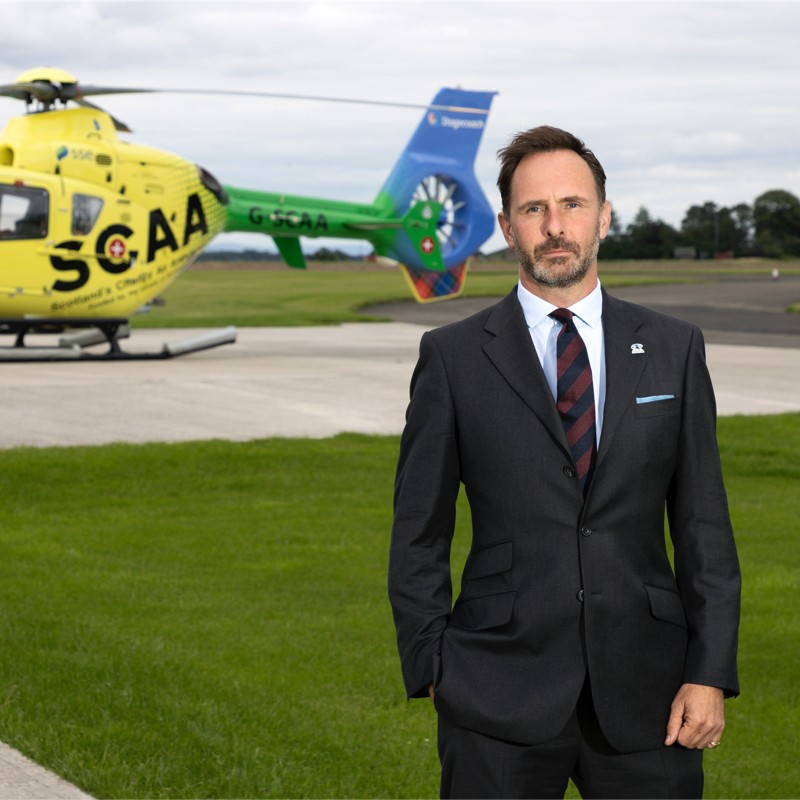
- Born: John Bullough; 2 April 1969
- Died: 5 May 2023 (aged 54)
- Education: The Royal Military Academy Sandhurst
- Occupations: Businessman, Special Constable, Charity Chairman, Racing Driver
- Spouse: Lady Culcreuch (born as Lady Georgina Dorothea Mary Murray)
- Children: 1

John Louis Bullough of Culcreuch, Baron of Culcreuch MBE (2 April 1969 – 5 May 2023) was a British businessman, special constable, racing driver, and former army officer best known for establishing Scotland's Charity Air Ambulance (SCAA) in 2013.

== Early life and military career ==
John Bullough was born in Brampton, Cumbria. He was the son of Michael and Sandra Bullough. Bullough attended Glenalmond College before graduating from the Royal Military Academy Sandhurst, where he was commissioned into the Scots Guards. He served during the first Gulf War and in Northern Ireland, rising to the rank of Captain.

== Career and philanthropy ==
Bullough was the manager of McEwens, a department store in Perth. Additionally, he played a role in the city's urban planning and development as the founding chairman of the Perth City Development Board. His tenure as chairman was marked by many notable efforts, including leading a prominent campaign aimed at repatriating the historic Stone of Destiny to Perth.

In 2013, Bullough became founding chairman of Scotland's Charity Air Ambulance (SCAA), an organisation that has made a significant impact on emergency healthcare in Scotland. Under his leadership, SCAA responded to nearly 5,000 callouts and raised over £50 million to support their mission. In recognition of his services to emergency healthcare, he was awarded an MBE in 2020.

== Personal life ==
Bullough was married to Lady Georgina Bullough, the daughter of William Murray, 8th Earl of Mansfield.

They had one son, Hercules William Michael Bullough, born on 11 April 2003.

Baronage of Scotland
Preceded by Michael Bullough	Baron of Culcreuch unknown-2023	Succeeded by Hercules Bullough
