= Colin Hurt =

English cricketer

Colin Noel Bickley Hurt (16 December 1893 — 31 December 1972) was an English cricketer who played for Derbyshire in 1914.

Hurt was born in Darley Dale. He played three first-class matches for Derbyshire during July 1914, and, in his second match, against Lancashire, was one of the three batsmen taken in a hat-trick scored by John Bullough. Hunt was a right-handed lower-order batsman and played 5 innings in 4 first-class matches. His top score was 13 and his average 4.6. He was a right-arm medium-pace bowler and bowled 3 overs without taking a wicket.

The First World War brought a stop to the championship and Hurt joined the 6th Bn, East Lancashire Regiment. He was a 2nd Lieutenant and was wounded in August 1915.

Hurt died at Little Common, Bexhill, Sussex at the age of 79.
