= Willie Smith (cricketer) =

English cricketer

Willie Smith (12 May 1885 – 8 May 1964) was an English cricketer who played first-class cricket for Derbyshire in 1913.

Smith was born at Gringley-on-the-Hill, Nottinghamshire. He made his debut for Derbyshire in May 1913 against Lancashire when he made 8 and 2. His next and last game for the club was against Somerset, when he scored 1 and 2. Smith was a right-hand batsman and played 4 innings in 2 first-class matches with a total of 13 runs.

Smith died at Scawsby, Yorkshire at the age of 78.
