= Archibold Figlan =

South African politician

Archibold Figlan MP
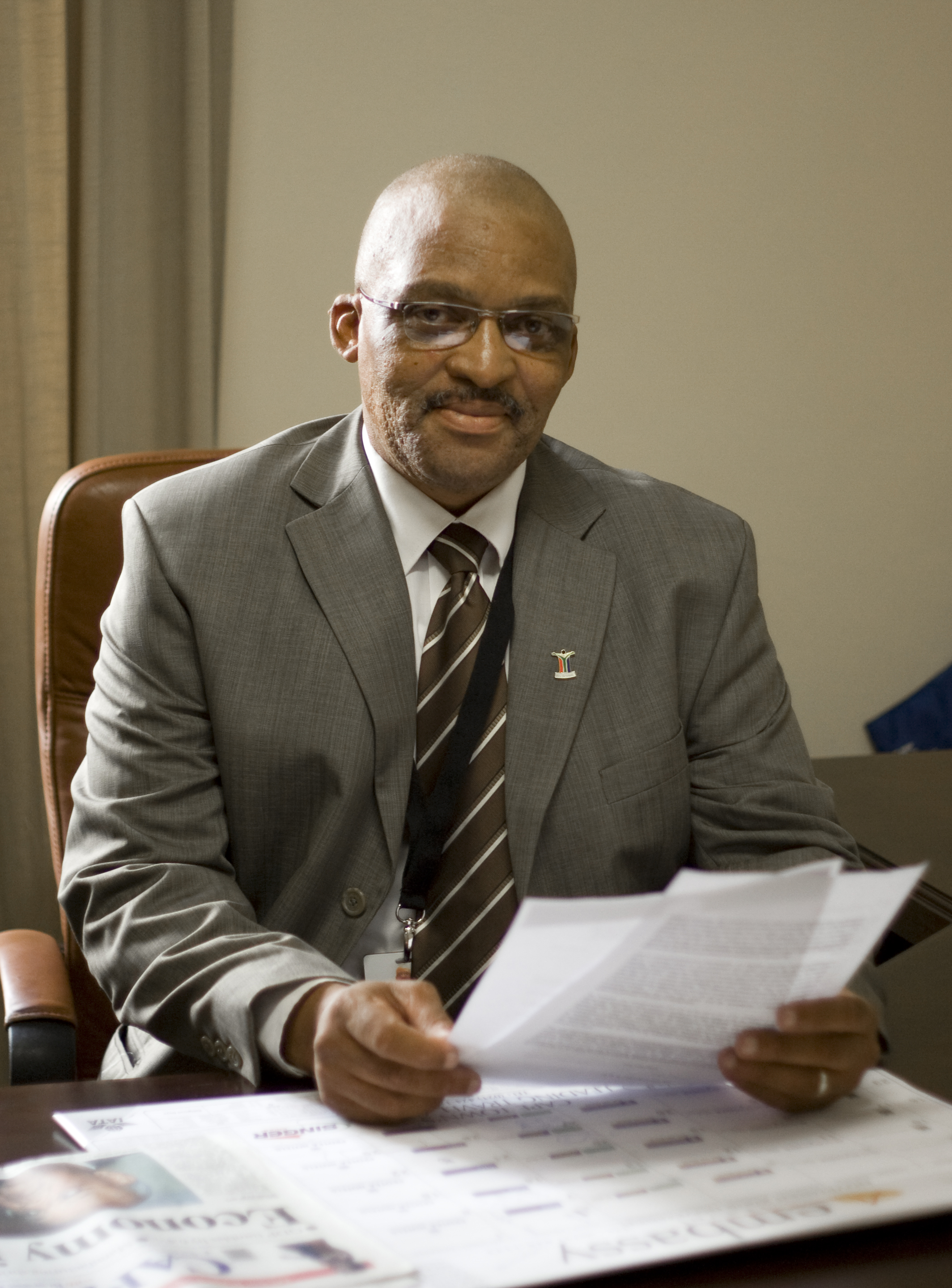

Shadow Deputy Minister of Human Settlements
- Incumbent
- Assumed office 2009
- Leader: Helen Zille

Member of Parliament for Western Cape
- Incumbent
- Assumed office 6 May 2009

Personal details
- Party: Democratic Alliance

Archibold Figlan is a South African politician, currently a Member of the Western Cape Provincial Parliament with the Democratic Alliance.

He was previously a member of national Parliament, and the Shadow Deputy Minister of Human Settlements.

He was found guilty of sexual harassment by an internal disciplinary committee and has received a suspended sentence for his crimes. He was charged after holding a colleagues hand against his private parts.

Political offices
Preceded by ??	South African Shadow Deputy Minister of Human Settlements; 2009–present	Incumbent
