= Archibold Cooper =

English cricketer

Personal information
- Full name: Archibold Henry Hedges Cooper
- Born: 14 August 1878; Cowley, Oxfordshire, England
- Died: 13 January 1922 (aged 43); Chesterfield, Derbyshire, England

Domestic team information
- Years: Team
- 1902: Derbyshire
- FC debut: 5 June 1902 Derbyshire v Yorkshire

Career statistics
Competition	First-class
Matches	1
Runs scored	0
Batting average	0.00
100s/50s	0/0
Top score	0
Balls bowled	12
Wickets	0
Bowling average	–
5 wickets in innings	–
10 wickets in match	–
Best bowling	–
Catches/stumpings	1/-
- Source: Cricinfo, 5 October 2025

Archibold Henry Hedges Cooper (14 August 1878 – 13 January 1922) was an English cricketer who played for Derbyshire in 1902.

Cooper was born in Cowley, Oxford, the son of Edward Cooper, a mercantile clerk and his wife Elizabeth. He played in one match for Derbyshire against Yorkshire during the 1902 season, though he did not bat during the match. Cooper bowled two overs during the game and took one catch in the outfield.

In 1922, Cooper died in Chesterfield at the age of 43. He officially died of complications from alcoholism leading to delirium tremens and heart failure, although he was locally believed to have died of self-inflicted stab wounds.
