= Walter Reader-Blackton =

English cricketer

Walter Reader-Blackton (4 July 1895 – 1 January 1976) was an English cricketer who played first-class cricket for Derbyshire between 1914 and 1921.

Reader-Blackton was born at Shirland, Derbyshire as Walter Blackton. He began playing for Derbyshire at the age of 18 in 1914, and after a game in the 2nd XI, made his first-class debut against Worcestershire in August 1914 when he was not out for 31.

First-class cricket was interrupted by the First World War and Reader-Blackton served in the Leicestershire Regiment (4th Bn Territorial Force). He was awarded the MC in 1919

...for conspicuous gallantry and cool leadership on 18th September, 1918, near Haisnes. He took a patrol through the enemy front line to the main line of resistance, where he remained some time acquiring valuable information, and returned safely with his patrol, though discovered by the enemy. The following night when attempting to capture a machine-gun post which he had located, his patrol was discovered, and came under heavy fire, but he got all his men back safely.

After the war, Reader-Blackton resumed playing for Derbyshire. He played two matches in 1920 in which he was out for 1 in each of his four innings and with a score of 1 in his first match in 1921 became the first player to be dismissed for 1 in five consecutive first-class innings. Against Gloucestershire in 1921 he took a rare bowling spell and achieved 3 for 40. He concluded his first-class career after his five matches in 1921.

Reader-Blackton was a right-hand batsman and played 15 innings in eight first-class matches with an average of 7.64 and a top score of 31 not out. He was a right-arm medium pace bowler and took 5 first-class wickets at an average of 16.20 and a best performance of 3 for 40.

Reader-Blackton married at Leek in 1922 and died at Derby, at the age of 80.
