= George Gunn (cricketer) =

English cricketer

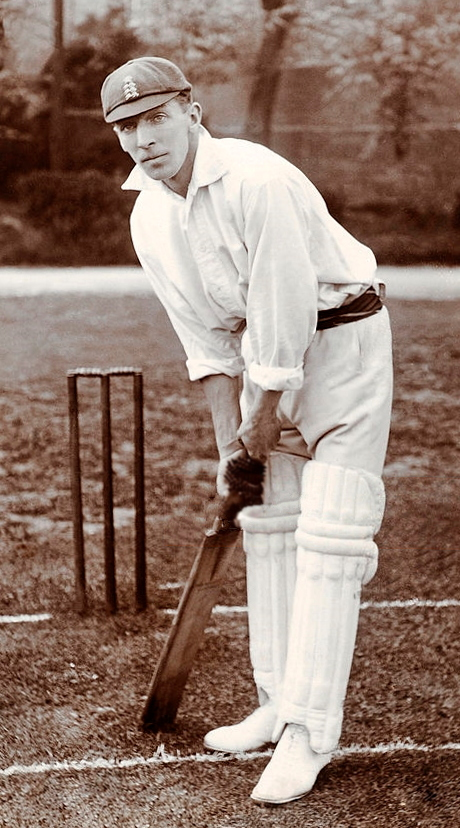
- Gunn in about 1910

Personal information
- Born: 13 June 1879; Hucknall, Nottinghamshire, England
- Died: 29 June 1958 (aged 79); Cuckfield, Sussex, England
- Batting: Right-handed
- Bowling: Right-arm
- Relatives: John Gunn (brother); George Gunn Jr. (son); Billy Gunn (uncle); Ernest Stapleton (brother-in-law)

International information
- National side: England
- Test debut: 13 December 1907 v Australia
- Last Test: 3 April 1930 v West Indies

Domestic team information
- Years: Team
- 1902–1932: Nottinghamshire

Career statistics
Competition	Test	First-class
Matches	15	643
Runs scored	1,120	35,208
Batting average	40.00	35.96
100s/50s	2/7	62/194
Top score	122*	220
Balls bowled	12	4,223
Wickets	0	66
Bowling average	–	35.68
5 wickets in innings	–	1
10 wickets in match	–	0
Best bowling	–	5/50
Catches/stumpings	15/–	477/–
- Source: CricInfo, 14 March 2020

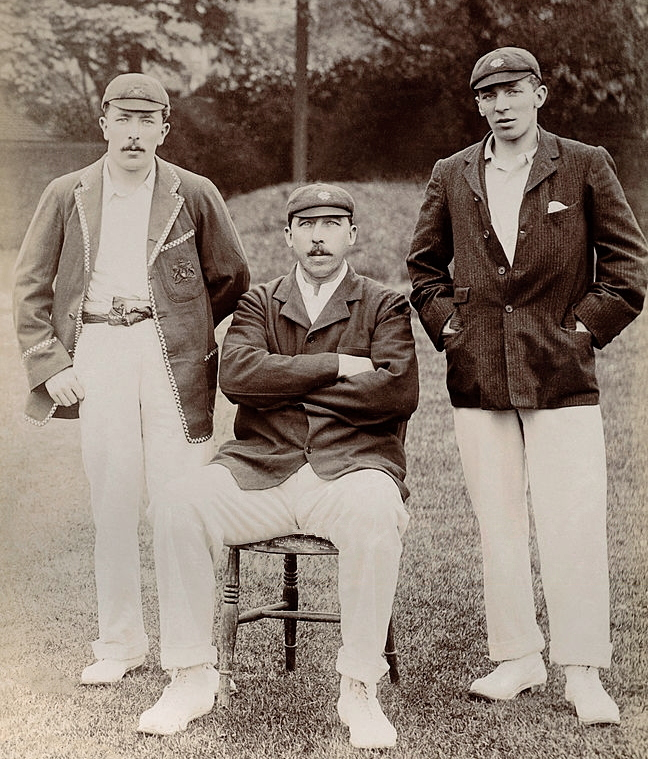
Left to right: John, Billy and George Gunn in around 1904

George Gunn (13 June 1879 – 29 June 1958) was an English cricketer who played in 15 Test matches between 1907 and 1930. Domestically, he played first-class cricket for Nottinghamshire from 1902 to 1932, and is their all-time leading run scorer.

== Playing career ==
Along with other notable batsmen such as Jack Hobbs, Frank Woolley and Phil Mead, he was one of a group who, beginning their careers in the Edwardian Era, seemed to go on for ever. In Gunn's case, it was from 1902 to 1932, in the course of which he made more runs for Nottinghamshire than anyone else, before or since: 31,592 at 35.70. Christopher Martin-Jenkins wrote of him: "A whimsical artist, George Gunn was capable of making runs against any attack, orthodox or unorthodox, as the mood took him. His record in a long career is outstanding, but all who saw him play regularly seem agreed that he should have scored even more runs than he did."

His Test career was an unusual one, all but one of his 15 Tests being outside England. He was not selected for the 1907–8 tour of Australia, but visited the country anyway, for the good of his health. It was arranged that he could be called upon by England if necessary. In the event, it was necessary, and he appeared in the first Test at Sydney. Scores of 119, in his first innings in Test cricket, and 74 ensured that he would play in all five Tests. He made another century, 122, in the fifth Test, also at Sydney. He topped the averages, with 462 runs at 51.33. He was only chosen for one Test in England's home series against Australia in 1909, making 0 and 1 in the second Test at Lord's, but toured again in 1911–12. Though not quite as successful as four years earlier, he made 381 runs at 42.33. After World War I, he was out of favour, and his final four Tests did not come until 1929–30, on a tour to the West Indies when several veteran players (e.g. Rhodes and Sandham) seem to have been chosen as a reward for long service.

He was a member of a notable Nottinghamshire cricketing family, being a younger brother of John Gunn and a nephew of Billy Gunn, both of whom also played Test cricket, and the father of G. V. Gunn. He scored 164 not out on his fiftieth birthday, 13 June 1929, at Worcester. In 1931, at the age of 52 he scored 183 against Warwickshire, with his son scoring 100 not out in the same innings, a unique occurrence in first-class cricket.

He was a Wisden Cricketer of the Year in 1914.
