= Henry Curgenven =

English cricketer

Personal information
- Full name: Henry Grafton Curgenven
- Born: 22 December 1875; Derby, England
- Died: 14 February 1959 (aged 83); Bridgend, Wales
- Batting: Right-handed
- Bowling: Right-arm fast-medium
- Relatives: William Curgenven (father); Gilbert Curgenven (brother)

Domestic team information
- Years: Team
- 1896–1897: Derbyshire
- 1897: Cambridge University
- FC debut: 23 July 1896 Derbyshire v Essex
- Last FC: 2 August 1897 Derbyshire v Hampshire

Career statistics
Competition	First-class
Matches	11
Runs scored	125
Batting average	9.61
100s/50s	0/0
Top score	26
Balls bowled	400
Wickets	7
Bowling average	31.85
5 wickets in innings	0
10 wickets in match	0
Best bowling	2/9
Catches/stumpings	6/–
- Source: CricketArchive, April 2012

Henry Grafton Curgenven (22 December 1875 – 14 February 1959) was an English cricketer. He played for Derbyshire in 1896 and 1897, and for Cambridge University in 1897.

Curgenven was born at Friar Gate Derby, the son of William Curgenven who was a doctor and former Derbyshire cricketer, and his wife Pamela Harman. He was educated at Repton School and Clare College, Cambridge, and became a farmer.

Curgenven debuted for Derbyshire in the 1896 season in a draw against Essex and played a total of five matches for the club that year. In the 1897 season he played four matches for Derbyshire and also two matches for Cambridge University against Marylebone Cricket Club (MCC).

Curvengen was a right-hand batsman and played 14 innings in 11 first-class matches with an average of 9.61 and a top score of 26. He was a right arm fast-medium bowler and took seven first-class wickets at an average of 31.85 and with a best performance of 2 for 9.

In 1913 Curgenven played a couple of matches in British Columbia, Canada against an Australian team.

Curgenven died at Bryncethin, Bridgend, Glamorgan. As well as his father, his brother Gilbert also played first-class cricket for Derbyshire.
