= Thomas Forrester (cricketer) =

English cricketer

Personal information
- Born: 21 September 1873; Clay Cross, Derbyshire, England
- Died: 27 December 1927 (aged 54); Nottingham, England
- Batting: Left-handed
- Bowling: Right-arm medium

Domestic team information
- Years: Team
- 1896–1899: Warwickshire
- 1902–1920: Derbyshire
- FC debut: 28 May 1896 Warwickshire v Leicestershire
- Last FC: 19 May 1920 Derbyshire v Lancashire

Career statistics
Competition	First-class
Matches	131
Runs scored	2,829
Batting average	15.80
100s/50s	0/11
Top score	87
Balls bowled	21,234
Wickets	347
Bowling average	25.70
5 wickets in innings	17
10 wickets in match	3
Best bowling	7/18
Catches/stumpings	61/–
- Source: CricketArchive, 23 July 2010

Thomas Forrester, also known as Thomas Forester, (21 September 1873 – 27 December 1927) was an English cricketer who played first-class cricket for Warwickshire from 1896 to 1899 and for Derbyshire from 1902 to 1920.

Forrester was born at Clay Cross, Derbyshire, the son of Thomas Forester, a coal miner, and his wife Elizabeth. Forrester made his debut for Warwickshire against Leicestershire in May 1896. He took a wicket and two catches in each of the innings. In a match against Hampshire he took 7 wickets for 56. During the 1897 season he took 5 for 72 against Leicestershire in his nine games. In 1898 he was down to four matches and in 1899 played seven.

After a break, he joined Derbyshire in the 1902 season. He played modestly in 1902 and 1903, and played just one game in the 1904 season. There was another break in his first-class cricket career, and he returned in the 1910 season a considerably developed player. He made 78 runs in a match against Hampshire although his bowling did not take off until the 1911 season. In that year he took 5 for 161 against Surrey, 5 for 36 against Lancashire, 6 for 39 against Northamptonshire and 6 for 30 against Hampshire. He also made 73 runs in a match against Essex. In the 1912 season he took 5 for 76 against an Australian touring side and his best performance of 7 for 18 against Northamptonshire. He also scored 84 not out against Essex. In the 1913 season he made his top score of 87 against Essex and took 5 for 76 against Sussex, 5 for 88 against Hampshire, 6 for 72 against Lancashire and 7 for 127 against Nottinghamshire. In the 1914 season he had two ten wicket matches with 5 for 47 and 5 for 83 in the same match against Lancashire, and 7 for 89 and 7 for 124 in the same match against Essex. First-class cricket was interrupted by the First World War, and Forrester played just two games in the 1920 season. Against Yorkshire he maintained form, but in his last match against Lancashire, after failing to take a wicket in 20 overs he was absent hurt for the remainder of the game and did not play again.

Forrester was a right-arm medium pace bowler and took 347 first-class wickets at an average of 25.70 and a best performance of 7 for 18. He took seventeen 5-wicket innings and three 10-wicket matches. He was a left-hand batsman and played 212 innings in 131 matches with an average of 15.80 and a top score of 87.

Forrester died at Standard Hill, Nottingham at the age of 54.
