= George Gunn Jr. (cricketer) =

English cricketer

George Gunn
Personal information
- Full name: George Vernon Gunn
- Born: 21 July 1905; West Bridgford, Nottinghamshire, England
- Died: 15 October 1957 (aged 52); Shelton, Shropshire, England
- Batting: Right-handed
- Bowling: Leg-break
- Relatives: George Gunn (father); John Gunn (uncle); Ernest Stapleton (uncle)

Domestic team information
- Years: Team
- 1928–1950: Nottinghamshire
- FC debut: 7 July 1928 Notts v West Indians
- Last FC: 12 August 1950 Notts v Derbyshire

Career statistics
| Competition | First-class |
|---|---|
| Matches | 266 |
| Runs scored | 10,337 |
| Batting average | 29.36 |
| 100s/50s | 11/56 |
| Top score | 184 |
| Balls bowled | 20,473 |
| Wickets | 281 |
| Bowling average | 35.67 |
| 5 wickets in innings | 9 |
| 10 wickets in match | 1 |
| Best bowling | 7/44 |
| Catches/stumpings | 114/– |
- Source: CricketArchive (subscription required), 30 March 2020

George Vernon Gunn (21 July 1905 – 15 October 1957) was an English cricketer who played first-class cricket for Nottinghamshire between 1928 and 1950. He was a right-handed middle-order batsman and a right-arm leg-break bowler.

== Early life and background ==
He was born in West Bridgford, Nottinghamshire in 1905. His father, George Gunn, and an uncle, John Gunn, played cricket for Nottinghamshire and England. Another uncle, Ernest Stapleton, played once for Derbyshire. He was generally known in his cricket career as George Gunn Jr or by his initials as G. V. Gunn.

== Playing career ==
Gunn made his First-class cricket debut for Nottinghamshire in 1928 against the touring West Indians. He received his county cap in 1931.

In a match against Warwickshire in 1931, he and his father achieved the rare feat of a father and son both scoring centuries in the same innings. Gunn's century came in unusual circumstances as he was on 95 when play ended. Under the playing conditions of the time, an extra half-hour of playing time was allowed to decide a first innings result. This time had expired with Gunn five runs short of a century, however his batting partner, Charlie Harris, convinced Warwickshire captain Bob Wyatt to resume play to allow Gunn to reach his hundred. Gunn brought up his century in the second additional over.

== Later life and death ==
After retiring from playing, Gunn took up coaching in the north of England. He served as an umpire in County Second XI cricket between 1953 and 1955.

He died in hospital at Shelton, Shropshire in 1957 as a result of injuries sustained in a motorcycle crash.
