= Joseph Gladwin =

English cricketer (1890–1962)

Joseph Gladwin (6 September 1890 — 8 September 1962) was an English first-class cricketer who played for Derbyshire.

Gladwin was born in Doe Lea, Derbyshire. He made his first cricketing appearance for the Derbyshire in the 2nd XI against the Warwickshire 2nd XI in 1914. He then played two first-class matches in the 1914 County Championship, debuting against Yorkshire as a tailender in an innings defeat and following up in a match against Warwickshire. After the interval of the First World War, Gladwin made his third and last first-class appearance in the 1919 County Championship. He was a right-handed batsman and played five innings in three first-class matches. His top score was 5. He was a right-arm medium-fast bowler who took one wicket in 30 balls bowled.

Gladwin died in Chesterfield at the age of 72. His son Cliff Gladwin played for Derbyshire and England.
