= Norton Hughes-Hallett =

English cricketer

Norton Montresor Hughes-Hallett (18 April 1895 – 26 March 1985) was a British Army officer and a cricketer who played for Derbyshire in 1913 and 1914.

Hughes-Hallett was born at Melbourne, Derbyshire, the son of Norton Joseph Hughes-Hallett, who was the Clerk to Derbyshire County Council, and his wife Alice Louisa Denton. He was educated at Haileybury College. He made his debut for Derbyshire in August 1913 in a match against Lancashire when he scored 32 in the first innings and took a wicket. He made little impact in the remaining two games that season. He played three games in 1914 with his top score of 67 against Hampshire and 53 against Leicestershire, but bowled little. Hughes-Hallett was an upper-middle order right-hand batsman and played 11 innings in 6 first-class matches for Derbyshire with a top score of 67 and an average of 17.80. He was a leg-break bowler and took one wicket with an average of 27.00.

Hughes-Hallett served with the King's Shropshire Light Infantry in World War I in France and Belgium and was wounded in action in July 1916 in France, suffering a serious wound to his right shoulder. After the war, he served in Ireland from 1919 to 1922. He played several games for the Gentlemen of Shropshire in the Netherlands in 1924. He was then posted to India, where he played for the Europeans in two Bombay Quadrangular Tournaments in 1925/26 and 1926 – 27. He achieved his best bowling performance of 8 – 81 against the Muslims in 1925 – 26, but in both years the Europeans lost to the Hindus in the final. In India, Hughes-Hallett played 6 innings in 4 matches with a top score of 41 and an average of 12.83. However, he took 16 wickets with an average of 17.81 and a best performance of 8 – 81.

Hughes-Hallett was involved in an unusual incident during the Europeans v Hindus match at Bombay during the 1925/26 Quadrangular Tournament. When batting, he received a note which said "hit or get out". Assuming that the note was from his captain, he carried out the order and got out, only to discover on his return to the pavilion that the note was a hoax.

He was a lieutenant-colonel in World War II with British Forces in Curaçao from 1941 to 1942 and garrison commander in Barbados in 1945 and 1946.

Hughes-Hallet died at Tewkesbury, Gloucestershire at the age of 89.

Hughes-Hallett married Laura Lindell Ross Fisher in Massachusetts, USA, in 1945. Following the divorce in 1951, he married Georgina Mary Thompson. His brother-in-law, John Pawle, also played first-class cricket.
