= John Bullough (cricketer) =

English cricketer

John Bullough (1893 – 3 June 1967) was an English cricketer active from 1914 to 1919 who played for Lancashire. He was born in Bolton and died in Westhoughton. He appeared in eight first-class matches as a righthanded batsman who bowled right arm slow pace. He scored 24 runs with a highest score of 17 and held three catches. He took 13 wickets with a best analysis of five for 123.
