= Maynard Ashcroft =

English cricketer and doctor (1875–1955)

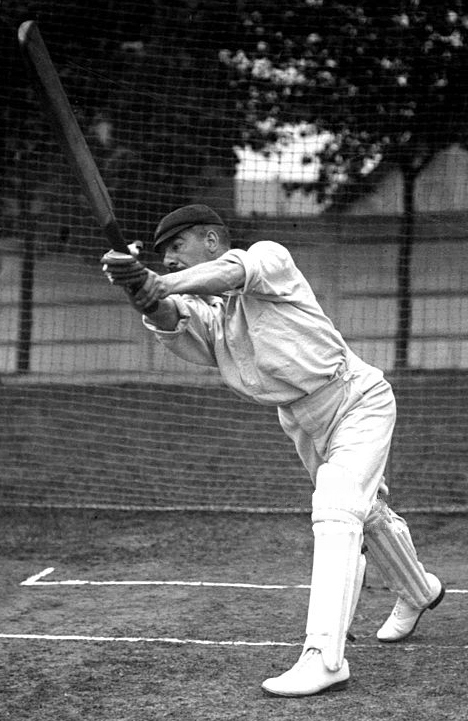
- Ashcoft photographed in around 1905

Personal information
- Full name: Edward Maynard Ashcroft
- Born: 27 September 1875; Longsight, Manchester, England
- Died: 26 February 1955 (aged 79); Upton-by-Chester, England
- Batting: Right-handed
- Bowling: Right-arm off-break

Domestic team information
- Years: Team
- 1897–1906: Derbyshire
- FC debut: 24 May 1897 Derbyshire v Surrey
- Last FC: 23 August 1906 Derbyshire v Lancashire

Career statistics
Competition	First-class
Matches	101
Runs scored	4,581
Batting average	29.17
100s/50s	8/29
Top score	162
Balls bowled	1,949
Wickets	24
Bowling average	49.41
5 wickets in innings	1
10 wickets in match	0
Best bowling	5/18
Catches/stumpings	33/–
- Source: CricketArchive, 8 February 2010

Edward Maynard Ashcroft (27 September 1875 – 26 February 1955) was an English medical doctor and cricketer who played first-class cricket for Derbyshire between 1897 and 1906 and captained the Derbyshire team in 1904.

== Early life ==
Ashcroft was born at Longsight, Manchester, son of Henry N Ashcroft, a Manchester merchant and his wife Charlotte. They lived at 14 Birch Side Moss Side. Ashcroft studied medicine at Owens College, Manchester, and became RMO at Dewsbury Smallpox Hospital. He later became assistant MOH at Derby.

== Cricket career ==
Ashcroft made his cricket debut for Derbyshire in 1897 and remained with the team until 1906. Ashcroft captained Derbyshire for part of 1904 although Albert Lawton who was captain in the preceding and succeeding years also captained games. Ashcroft was a right hand batsman who played 170 innings in 101 first-class matches. His highest score was 162 and his average 29.17. He was a right arm off-break bowler who took 24 wickets with an average of 49.41. While he was captain, Derbyshire ended the season at 10th in the table. Wisden described him as "a free-scoring batsman" who "drove and cut specially well".

== Later life ==
Ashcroft was later Medical Officer and Public Vaccinator for Levenshulme. He died at Upton-by-Chester, Cheshire aged 79.

Sporting positions
Preceded by Albert Lawton	Derbyshire cricket captains 1904	Succeeded by Albert Lawton
