= Randal C. Archibold =

Senior editor, New York Times

- Born: July 29, 1965 (age 59); Queens, New York, USA
- Education: Rutgers University
- Occupation: Senior editor of news at The New York Times
- Spouse: Lucille Renwick (m. 1998)

Randal C. Archibold (born July 29, 1965) is an American journalist who currently holds the title of Senior Editor at The New York Times.

== Early life and education ==
Archibold was born in Queens to Panamanian immigrant parents and raised in Manalapan Township, New Jersey where he graduated from Manalapan High School in 1983. He was first exposed to the world of journalism delivering newspapers for the Asbury Park Press. Archibold later attended Rutgers University where he graduated with a BA in Spanish in 1987. At Rutgers, Archibold was the senior news editor for The Daily Targum, where he covered Rutgers' South Africa Apartheid Divestment Movement.

== Career ==
=== Early career ===
Archibold started his career as a staff writer at The News-Tribune in Woodbridge, NJ. He then moved on to work as a staff writer for local news at The San Diego Union-Tribune, before moving on to be a general assignment reporter at The Los Angeles Daily News. He was a staff writer and editor for local news at The Los Angeles Times before joining The New York Times in 1998. At The New York Times, he started as a reporter on the Metro staff writing on education, politics, the suburbs of New York and the September 11 attacks. Post September 11th, he worked on the "Portraits of Grief" series, writing profiles on victims of the attacks, a series that later won the Times a Pulitzer Prize. He worked on the John Edwards presidential campaign in 2004 and the New York City mayoral campaign in 2005 before moving to National in Los Angeles to work on border and immigration stories.

=== Later career ===
In 2010, Archibold was named the bureau chief of Mexico City, where he served until 2015. In Mexico City, Archibold wrote about Joaquín "El Chapo" Guzmán including his capture and his escape, gangs in Central America, the Haiti 2010 earthquake and diplomatic relations between Cuba and the United States of America. His main coverage was on organized crime and drug cartels.

Upon his return to New York in 2015, Archibold was appointed the deputy sports editor, and later named the sports editor in 2019. As deputy sports editor, he covered Olympics, Super Bowls and social issues in sports. As sports editor, he covered the intersection of sports and society, including the influence of Colin Kaepernick on sports and politics.

After serving on the sports desk for eight years, Archibold was promoted to senior editor of news, which is the position he currently holds.

== Personal life ==
Archibold married Lucille Renwick in 1998, and they now reside in Westchester County, New York.
