= Gilbert Curgenven =

English cricketer

Personal information
- Full name: Gilbert Curgenven
- Born: 1 December 1882; Derby, England
- Died: 26 May 1934 (aged 51); Birmingham, England
- Batting: Right-handed
- Bowling: Slow
- Relatives: William Curgenven (father); Henry Curgenven (brother)

Domestic team information
- Years: Team
- 1901–1922: Derbyshire
- FC debut: 5 August 1901 Derbyshire v Hampshire
- Last FC: 26 August 1922 Derbyshire v Worcestershire

Career statistics
Competition	First-class
Matches	96
Runs scored	3,440
Batting average	20.97
100s/50s	3/18
Top score	124
Balls bowled	1913
Wickets	25
Bowling average	46.52
5 wickets in innings	0
10 wickets in match	0
Best bowling	3/32
Catches/stumpings	40/–
- Source: CricketArchive, 2 December 2010

Gilbert Curgenven (1 December 1882 – 26 May 1934) was an English first-class cricketer who played for Derbyshire between 1901 and 1922.

Curgenven was born at Friar Gate, Derby, the son of William Curgenven a doctor who was one of the founders of Derbyshire County Cricket Club. He was educated at Repton School and became a farmer. He made his first-class debut for Derbyshire in the 1901 season in August against Hampshire when he made 15 not out in his second innings. Although he played six more games that season, he only played four games in the 1902 season and one in the 1903 season. He played in full in the 1904 season making his top score of 124 against Surrey. In the 1905 season, he was down to four games and then was absent from English first-class cricket until the 1909 season. He played a spread of games in 1909 and also in the 1910 season when he scored centuries against Essex and Nottinghamshire. He went to British Columbia where in 1912 and 1913 he played for a newly formed club at Cowichan. In a game for them against the Australians he took 5 for 89 in a non first-class game. Back in Derbyshire in the 1914 season, he played a full season that year.

During World War I, Curgenven was a 2nd lieutenant in the 2nd County of London Yeomanry and then joined the Royal Flying Corps. After the war, he played a full season for Derbyshire in the 1921 season and in eight matches in the 1922 season, which was his last.

Curgenven was a right-hand batsman and played 169 innings in 96 matches at an average of 20.97. He scored three centuries with a top score of 124. He was a slow bowler and took 25 first-class wickets at an average of 46.52 and a best performance of 3 for 32.

Curgenven died at Birmingham, Warwickshire at the age of 52. As well as his father, his brother Henry Curgenven also played cricket for Derbyshire.

Curgenven married Lily Katinka D Naerup at Swansea in 1906 and had two daughters.
