= Kenward =

Kenward is a surname. Notable people with the surname include:

- Betty Kenward (1906–2001), English journalist
- Charles Kenward (1877–1948), English cricketer
- James Kenward (1908–1994), English writer and illustrator
- Michael Kenward (born 1945), British science writer
- Paul Kenward (born 1973), British businessman
- Richard Kenward (1875–1957), English cricketer
- Shane Kenward (born 1972), rugby league player

== See also ==
- Kenward Elmslie (1929–2022), American writer and poet
