= Derbyshire County Cricket Club in 1901 =

1901 season of an English cricket team

Derbyshire County Cricket Club seasons
1901 season
- Captain: Samuel Hill Wood
- County Championship: 15
- Most runs: Levi Wright
- Most wickets: Billy Bestwick
- Most catches: William Storer

Derbyshire County Cricket Club in 1901 represents the cricket season when the English club Derbyshire had been playing for thirty years. It was their seventh season in the County Championship and they failed to win a single match, ending bottom of the Championship table.

== 1901 season ==
Derbyshire CCC played twenty games in the County Championship in 1901 in addition to matches against W.G. Grace's London County Cricket Club, MCC and the touring South Africans. Derbyshire failed to win any first class match during the season.

The captain for the year was Samuel Hill Wood in his third season as captain. However he only took part in five matches and Albert Lawton filled the role on the pitch. Levi Wright was top scorer making two centuries, one of 193. Billy Bestwick took 71 wickets.

Gilbert Curgenven made his debut for the side as did Robert Else who only played in two seasons. Joseph Burton, Arthur Barton, James Oldknow and Arthur Morton made their only appearances for the side during the 1901 season.

Nudger Needham captained the English football team in 1901.

=== Matches ===
List of matches
| No. | Date | V | Result | Margin | Notes |
| 1 | 13 May 1901 | London County Cricket Club; Crystal Palace Park | Lost | Innings and 119 runs | Not a County Championship match Beldam 125; Fishwick 103; Sinclair 8-32; JJ Hulme 5-61 |
| 2 | 16 May 1901 | Surrey; Kennington Oval | Lost | Innings and 111 runs | Hayward 158; Jephson 133; W Bestwick 7-97; Lockwood 7-57; Richardson 6-67 |
| 3 | 20 May 1901 | Yorkshire; Fartown, Huddersfield | Lost | Innings and 282 runs | Tunnicliffe 145; Brown 5-33; Hirst 7-43 |
| 4 | 23 May 1901 | MCC; Lord's Cricket Ground, St John's Wood | Lost | 9 wickets | Not a County Championship match Hearne 7-67; Rawlin 5-28 |
| 5 | 27 May 1901 | Hampshire; County Ground, Southampton | Lost | 2 wickets | S Evershed 123; Greig 6-38; Llewellyn 5-76; W Bestwick 6-71 |
| 6 | 30 May 1901 | Surrey; County Ground, Derby | Lost | 5 wickets | Lees 5-47; JJ Hulme 5-71 |
| 7 | 06 Jun 1901 | South Africans; County Ground, Derby | Lost | 5 wickets | Not a County Championship match Bisset 184; Graham 6-84 and 5-47 |
| 8 | 10 Jun 1901 | Essex; County Ground, Leyton | Drawn | | Owen 106; Perrin 101; Reeves 6-46 |
| 9 | 13 Jun 1901 | Worcestershire; County Ground, New Road, Worcester | Lost | Innings and 49 runs | Wilson 6-55 |
| 10 | 17 Jun 1901 | Gloucestershire; Ashley Down Ground, Bristol | Drawn | | L Wright 155; W Chatterton 169; Langdon 114; Huggins 6-100 |
| 11 | 20 Jun 1901 | Warwickshire; County Ground, Derby | Drawn | | Willie Quaife 117; |
| 12 | 27 Jun 1901 | Yorkshire; North Road Ground, Glossop | Lost | 245 runs | Wainwright 108; W Bestwick 7-70; Haigh 5-55 |
| 13 | 01 Jul 1901 | London County Cricket Club; Queen's Park, Chesterfield | Drawn | | Not a County Championship match W Storer 5-20 |
| 14 | 15 Jul 1901 | Nottinghamshire; County Ground, Derby | Drawn | | Gunn 273; L Wright 193; Jones 6-93 |
| 15 | 18 Jul 1901 | Leicestershire; North Road Ground, Glossop | Lost | Innings and 20 runs | King 143; MacDonald 147*; Geeson 104*; Geeson 6-128 and 6-111 |
| 16 | 22 Jul 1901 | Gloucestershire; County Ground, Derby | Drawn | | Paish 6-120 |
| 17 | 29 Jul 1901 | Lancashire; County Ground, Derby | Lost | Innings and 184 runs | Ward 117; Tyldesley 158; JJ Hulme 6-135; Cuttell 7-19; Webb 5-58 |
| 18 | 05 Aug 1901 | Hampshire; At County Ground, Derby | Lost | 5 wickets | Sprot 130; Llewellyn 5-108; JJ Hulme 5-73; W Bestwick 5-89 |
| 19 | 08 Aug 1901 | Lancashire; Old Trafford, Manchester | Drawn | | |
| 20 | 12 Aug 1901 | Nottinghamshire; Welbeck Abbey Cricket Ground | Lost | Innings and 159 runs | Iremonger 108; Wass 8-17 and 5-23; Gunn 5-14 |
| 21 | 15 Aug 1901 | Warwickshire; Edgbaston, Birmingham | Lost | Innings and 52 runs | Fishwick 140*; Charlesworth 6-45 |
| 22 | 19 Aug 1901 | Worcestershire; County Ground, Derby | Lost | Innings and 121 runs | H Foster 152; Bowley 140; R Foster 111; Wilson 6-57; Pearson 5-48 |
| 23 | 22 Aug 1901 | Essex; Queen's Park, Chesterfield | Lost | 9 wickets | Carpenter 144; Russell 100; Mead 6-97; Young 7-48 |
| 24 | 29 Aug 1901 | Leicestershire; Aylestone Road, Leicester | Drawn | | King 5-65 |

== Statistics ==
=== County Championship batting averages ===
| Name | Matches | Inns | Runs | High score | Average | 100s |
|---|---|---|---|---|---|---|
| SH Evershed | 1 | 2 | 132 | 123 | 66.00 | 1 |
| LG Wright | 19 | 37 | 1239 | 193 | 33.48 | 2 |
| W Wilmot | 3 | 5 | 93 | 25* | 31.00 | 0 |
| W Chatterton | 20 | 38 | 987 | 169 | 29.90 | 1 |
| H Bagshaw | 10 | 19 | 514 | 92* | 28.55 | 0 |
| AE Lawton | 20 | 37 | 921 | 91 | 25.58 | 0 |
| W Storer | 20 | 38 | 932 | 76 | 25.18 | 0 |
| W Sugg | 4 | 8 | 174 | 59 | 24.85 | 0 |
| W Locker | 12 | 23 | 458 | 76 | 19.91 | 0 |
| JP Burton | 7 | 12 | 200 | 51* | 18.18 | 0 |
| A Warren | 8 | 15 | 233 | 37 | 17.92 | 0 |
| E Needham | 14 | 25 | 422 | 72 | 16.88 | 0 |
| SH Wood | 5 | 9 | 133 | 54* | 16.62 | 0 |
| G Curgenven | 7 | 13 | 125 | 27* | 12.50 | 0 |
| JJ Hulme | 20 | 36 | 297 | 38* | 9.28 | 0 |
| JH Young | 10 | 18 | 120 | 24 | 9.23 | 0 |
| EM Ashcroft | 2 | 4 | 36 | 22 | 9.00 | 0 |
| W Ellis | 2 | 4 | 27 | 9 | 9.00 | 0 |
| GR Gregory | 2 | 4 | 33 | 16 | 8.25 | 0 |
| SWA Cadman | 3 | 6 | 32 | 13* | 6.40 | 0 |
| D Bottom | 1 | 2 | 9 | 9 | 4.50 | 0 |
| W Bestwick | 17 | 31 | 83 | 11 | 4.36 | 0 |
| A Barton | 3 | 6 | 24 | 7 | 4.00 | 0 |
| FA Barrs | 1 | 2 | 7 | 7 | 3.50 | 0 |
| W Birkett | 3 | 6 | 14 | 10 | 2.33 | 0 |
| J Oldknow | 2 | 4 | 7 | 4* | 2.33 | 0 |
| R Else | 1 | 2 | 3 | 2 | 1.50 | 0 |
| JH Purdy | 1 | 2 | 3 | 2 | 1.50 | 0 |
| A Morton | 1 | 2 | 0 | 0 | 0.00 | 0 |
| JA Berwick | 1 | 2 | 0 | 0 | 0.00 | 0 |

Paul Boissier and Oswald Burton played in the match against MCC, but not in the County Championship.

=== County Championship bowling averages ===
| Name | Balls | Runs | Wickets | BB | Average |
|---|---|---|---|---|---|
| W Bestwick | 4159 | 1947 | 71 | 7-70 | 27.42 |
| JJ Hulme | 4847 | 2231 | 53 | 6-135 | 42.09 |
| W Storer | 1868 | 1444 | 28 | 4-121 | 51.57 |
| AE Lawton | 966 | 587 | 10 | 2-16 | 58.70 |
| JH Young | 783 | 408 | 7 | 2-11 | 58.28 |
| A Warren | 894 | 592 | 7 | 3-60 | 84.57 |
| H Bagshaw | 440 | 254 | 5 | 4-75 | 50.80 |
| W Chaterton | 282 | 121 | 4 | 2-2 | 30.25 |
| J Oldknow | 252 | 162 | 4 | 3-123 | 40.50 |
| G Curgenven | 324 | 243 | 4 | 2-45 | 60.75 |
| JA Berwick | 186 | 107 | 3 | 2-28 | 35.66 |
| SWA Cadman | 239 | 100 | 2 | 1-6 | 50.00 |
| EM Ashcroft | 78 | 40 | 1 | 1-9 | 40.00 |
| W Sugg | 102 | 43 | 1 | 1-19 | 43.00 |
| JA Berwick | 102 | 55 | 0 | | |
| A Barton | 84 | 61 | 0 | | |
| LG Wright | 60 | 18 | 0 | | |
| SH Wood | 48 | 14 | 0 | | |
| D Bottom | 36 | 12 | 0 | | |
| JH Purdy | 30 | 9 | 0 | | |
| W Ellis | 24 | 19 | 0 | | |
| A Morton | 18 | 14 | 0 | | |
| FA Barrs | 12 | 12 | 0 | | |

=== County Championship Wicket keeping ===
- W Storer Matches 18 Catches 21, Stumping 3
- W Wilmot Matches 3 Catches 8

== See also ==
- Derbyshire County Cricket Club seasons
- 1901 English cricket season
