= Icklesham =

Village and parish in East Sussex, England

Coordinates: 50.92°N 0.67°E

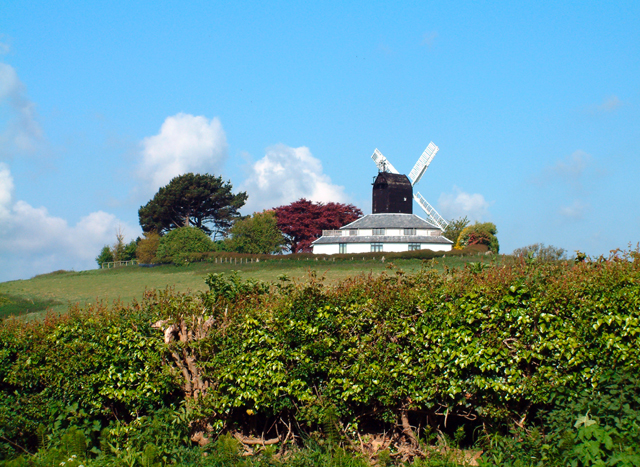
- The windmill

- Location within East Sussex
- Area: 23.5 km^{2} (9.1 sq mi)
- Population: 2,751 (Parish-2011)
  - Density: 309/sq mi (119/km^{2})
- OS grid reference: TQ875162
  - London: 53 miles (85 km) NW
- Civil parish: Icklesham
- District: Rother
- Shire county: East Sussex
- Region: South East
- Country: England
- Sovereign state: United Kingdom
- Post town: WINCHELSEA
- Postcode district: TN36
- Dialling code: 01424
- Police: Sussex
- Fire: East Sussex
- Ambulance: South East Coast
- UK Parliament: Hastings and Rye

Icklesham is a village and civil parish in the Rother district of East Sussex, England. The village is located about six miles (10 km) east of Hastings, on the main A259 Hastings to Rye road. The surrounding countryside is a made up of fields, hills, woods, orchards and vineyards.

The civil parish is large, and includes Icklesham itself, Winchelsea, Winchelsea Beach and Rye Harbour.

== History ==
Icklesham's historic roots can be traced back to 772, when it appeared as Icoleshamme in a land charter signed by Offa, King of Mercia. Strategically located on the River Brede, it was a prime target in the Norman invasion of 1066 (some 700 years later, evacuation plans were prepared in case of an invasion by Napoleon).

The 12th Century church of All Saints & St. Nicholas was restored by architect Samuel Sanders Teulon in the late 1840s. The church was originally dedicated to All Saints in the Norman period but was changed by Henry VIII to St. Nicolas. Nicholas is associated with protecting mariners, appropriate as Icklesham was still coastal at the time.

== Landmarks ==
Hogg Hill Mill which overlooks the village, is used as a recording studio by Sir Paul McCartney.

A sandstone circle is located to the east of the parish church in a field by the main A259 road. It was constructed in approximately 2012.

The parish contains three Sites of Special Scientific Interest—Winchelsea Cutting, "Dungeness, Romney Marsh and Rye Bay" and Rye Harbour. Winchelsea Cutting is a 0.3-acre (0.12 ha) roadside cutting with 33 feet (10 m) of exposed geological strata. Dungeness, Romney Marsh and Rye is a large site of 1,801 acres (729 ha), lying along the coast, and extending into the neighbouring county of Kent. Its interest is biological and geological, with various habitats of shingle, saltmarsh, sand dunes and saline lagoons. Rye Harbour is another 1,881-acre (761 ha) site of biological importance, with a varied habitat of shingle, intertidal mudflats and saltmarsh.

== Notable people ==
- Charles Kenward (1877–1948), first-class cricketer
- Richard Kenward (1875–1957), first-class cricketer
