= Alfred Charlesworth =

English cricketer

Personal information
- Full name: Alfred Charlesworth
- Born: 9 May 1865; Simmondley, Derbyshire, England
- Died: 4 December 1928 (aged 63); Lytham St Annes, England

Domestic team information
- Years: Team
- 1888–1898: Derbyshire
- FC debut: 3 July 1898 Derbyshire v Essex
- Last FC: 18 August 1898 Derbyshire v Yorkshire

Career statistics
Competition	First-class
Matches	7
Runs scored	92
Batting average	10.22
100s/50s	0/0
Top score	23
Balls bowled	60
Wickets	0
Bowling average	–
5 wickets in innings	–
10 wickets in match	–
Best bowling	–
Catches/stumpings	2/–
- Source: CricketArchive, February 2012

Alfred Charlesworth (9 May 1865 – 4 December 1928) was an English cricketer who played for Derbyshire in 1888 and 1898.

Charlesworth was born in Simmondley, Derbyshire, the son of John Charlesworth, a stonemason, and his wife Ann. In 1881 at the age of 16, Charlesworth was a clerk.

Charlesworth played three matches for Derbyshire in the 1888 season, the first of the seasons when they lost first-class status and made little impression. Charlesworth reappeared for Derbyshire in the 1898 season, making his first-class debut against Essex. Despite being absent hurt in the first innings, he returned during Derbyshire's attempt at bowling out a high-scoring Essex team, in which every player but wicket-keeper Solomon Hardy and opener Sydney Evershed had a crack at bowling, in many cases economical but unsuccessful. Charlesworth played six more first-class matches for the club in the season. He only bowled again in a draw against Nottinghamshire. His last match was against Yorkshire in what remains the highest score against Derbyshire. He was absent hurt again in this match, this time in the second innings.

Charlesworth was a lower-order/tailend batsman and played ten innings in seven first-class matches with an average of 10.22 and a top score of 23. He bowled sixty balls at the cost of 47 runs without taking a wicket.

Charlesworth died in St-Anne's-on-Sea, now part of Lytham St Annes at the age of 63.
