= Arthur Morton =

Arthur Morton may refer to:

- Arthur Morton (American football) (1914–1999), American football coach
- Arthur Morton (footballer) (1925–2011), English former professional footballer
- Arthur Morton (cricketer, born 1882) (1882–1970), English cricketer
- Arthur Morton (cricketer, born 1883) (1883–1935), English cricketer
- Arthur Henry Aylmer Morton (1836–1913), British Conservative politician, MP for Deptford
- A. L. Morton (1903–1987), English Marxist historian
- Arthur Silver Morton (1870–1945), Canadian historian, archivist and academic
