= James Cross (disambiguation) =

James Cross (1921–2021) was a British diplomat in Canada who was kidnapped by militants in 1970.

James Cross may also refer to:

- James Albert Cross (1876–1952), lawyer and political figure in Saskatchewan, Canada
- James B. Cross (1819–1876), American lawyer and politician
- James U. Cross (1925–2015), United States Air Force brigadier general and author
- James Cross (cricketer) (1862–1927), English cricketer
- James E. Cross (1840–1917), American soldier and Medal of Honor recipient
- Jim Cross (ice hockey, born 1957), Canadian former professional ice hockey player
- Jim Cross (ice hockey coach) (1933–2020), American ice hockey coach
- Jim Cross (rugby union) (1930–2024), Australian rugby union player
- Jim Cross, a character in The Reluctant Fundamentalist
- "James Cross", pseudonym of Hugh Jones Parry (1916–1997), British-born American writer
