= Albert Steeples =

English cricketer

Personal information
- Born: 29 July 1870; Somercotes, Derbyshire, England
- Died: 14 August 1945 (aged 75); Derby, England
- Batting: Right-handed
- Bowling: Right-arm medium-fast
- Relatives: Dick Steeples (brother)

Domestic team information
- Years: Team
- 1899: Derbyshire
- Only FC: May 1899 Derbyshire v Surrey

Career statistics
Competition	First-class
Matches	1
Runs scored	18
Batting average	9.00
100s/50s	0/0
Top score	16
Balls bowled	30
Wickets	0
Bowling average	–
5 wickets in innings	–
10 wickets in match	–
Best bowling	–
Catches/stumpings	0/–
- Source: CricketArchive, 1 April 2012

Albert Steeples (28 July 1870 – 14 August 1945) was an English cricketer who played for Derbyshire in 1899.

Steeples was born at Somercotes, Alfreton, Derbyshire, the son of John Steeples, a coal miner. He married Ellen Roughton, daughter of John Roughton and Hannah Carlin, on 9 July 1892 in Alfreton, Derbyshire.

Steeples' made his only first-class appearance for Derbyshire in the 1899 season in May against Surrey. Steeples as last man in made 16 in a last wicket stand to help avoid a follow on. He bowled five overs in the first innings, but with little success. Steeples was a right-handed batsman and made 18 runs in his two innings. He was a right-arm medium-fast bowler and gave away 21 runs in 30 balls for no wicket.

Steeples died in Derby at the age of 75. His brother, Dick, played three games for Derbyshire during the 1897 season.
