= Leonard Ward =

Leonard Ward may refer to:

- Leonard Ward (English cricketer) (1866–1945), English clergyman and cricketer
- Leonard C. Ward (1917–2001), United States Army officer
- Leonard Keith Ward (1879–1964), Australian geologist, public servant and cricketer
- Len Ward, player for Keighley Cougars
