= Joseph Burton =

Joseph Burton may refer to:

- Joseph R. Burton (1852–1923), American politician
- Joseph Burton (cricketer) (1873–1940), English cricketer
- Joseph William Burton (1892–1960), Canadian politician and farmer
