= Delacombe (surname) =

Delacombe is a surname. Notable people with this surname include:

- Rohan Delacombe (1906–1991), British Army officer
- William Delacombe (1860–1911), English cricketer
