= Derbyshire County Cricket Club in 1899 =

1899 season of an English cricket team

Derbyshire County Cricket Club seasons
1899 season
- Captain: Samuel Hill Wood
- County Championship: 15
- Most runs: Levi Wright
- Most wickets: John Hulme
- Most catches: William Storer

Derbyshire County Cricket Club in 1899 was the cricket season when the English club Derbyshire had been playing for twenty-eight years. It was their fifth season in the County Championship and they won three matches to finish fifteenth in the Championship table.

== 1899 season ==
Derbyshire played eighteen games in the County Championship in 1899, one match against MCC and one match against the touring Australians. They only won two matches in the County Championship, which left them at the bottom of the table. The early death of George Davidson from pneumonia in February had deprived Derbyshire of a valuable all-rounder with several years potential service ahead of him, and left the bowling dependent almost entirely upon Hulme, who had probably his best season with 93 first-class wickets in a very unfavourable summer for bowlers due to dry weather. The captain was Samuel Hill Wood in his first season as captain. Levi Wright was top scorer. William Storer played for England in the first test against Australia in June.

The most significant addition to the Derbyshire squad in the season was Joe Humphries who became a long-serving wicket keeper. John Young played the first of three seasons in which he played frequently, but the remainder who made their debut played only in 1899 or intermittently thereafter. George Gregory and Thomas Higson played intermittently up to 1910. Richard Kenward played one season and next played for Sussex. Albert Steeples, Leonard Ward and Frank Wright played one career first class match each during the season.

=== Matches ===
List of matches
No.	Date	V	Result	Margin	Notes
1	4 May 1899	Surrey; Kennington Oval	Lost	10 wickets	Brockwell 102; Jephson 5–51
2	15 May 1899	Warwickshire; County Ground, Derby	Drawn		Dickens 5–22 and 6–23; JJ Hulme 7–58
3	18 May 1899	MCC; Lord's Cricket Ground, St John's Wood	Won	2 wickets	Martin 5–13 and 6–76
4	22 May 1899	Hampshire; County Ground, Southampton	Won	7 wickets	JJ Hulme 5–60; Baldwin 6–113
5	25 May 1899	Leicestershire; Grace Road, Leicester	Drawn		de Trafford 117; JJ Hulme 5–35
6	5 Jun 1899	Surrey; Queen's Park, Chesterfield	Lost	Innings and 164 runs	Jephson 5–12
7	8 Jun 1899	Yorkshire; Dewsbury and Savile Ground	Lost	9 wickets	JA Berwick 5–82; Rhodes 5–65; Hirst 5–57
8	12 Jun 1899	Lancashire; Old Trafford, Manchester	Lost	8 wickets	Cutell 120; Hallows 5–31
9	19 Jun 1899	Nottinghamshire; Trent Bridge, Nottingham	Lost	Innings and 180 runs	Wass 5–42; Bottom 5–34; H Bagshaw 5–18
10	22 Jun 1899	Essex; County Ground, Leyton	Won	98 runs	Mead 6–54 and 5–51; JJ Hulme 6–52 and 6–29
11	26 Jun 1899	Australia; County Ground, Derby	Lost	Innings and 249 runs	Trumble 100; Noble 156; Darling 134*; McLeod 6–89
12	3 Jul 1899	Yorkshire County Ground, Derby	Lost	Innings and 160 runs	Brown 192; JJ Hulme 7–124; Wainwright 7–38
13	13 Jul 1899	Lancashire; North Road Ground, Glossop	Lost	269 runs	JJ Hulme 6–50; Mold 7–19; W Storer 5–59; A Ward 6–29
14	20 Jul 1899	Leicestershire; Queen's Park, Chesterfield	Drawn		W Storer 216
15	24 Jul 1899	Essex; County Ground, Derby	Drawn		Perrin 196; Bull 5–71
16	31 Jul 1899	Worcestershire; County Ground, Derby	Drawn		Arnold 121; W Sugg 107; W Bestwick 5–86
17	7 Aug 1899	Hampshire; County Ground, Derby	Lost	9 wickets	LG Wright 138; Heseltine 7–106; JJ Hulme 6–108
18	17 Aug 1899	Worcestershire; County Ground, New Road, Worcester	Lost	Innings and 218 runs	G Bromley-Martin 129; H Foster 162; Lowe 102; Burrows 5–37; Wilson 5–45
19	21 Aug 1899	Nottinghamshire; County Ground, Derby	Drawn		LG Wright 115; A Jones 5–140
20	28 Aug 1899	Warwickshire; Edgbaston, Birmingham	Drawn		

== Statistics ==
=== County Championship batting averages ===
Name	Matches	Inns	Runs	High score	Average	100s
W Storer	17	31	1027	216*	39.50	1
LG Wright	18	34	1064	138	33.25	2
H Bagshaw	16	30	820	77*	28.27	0
SH Evershed	2	3	78	39	26.00	0
W Sugg	14	24	552	107	23.00	1
WB Delacombe	1	2	23	20*	23.00	0
Samuel Hill Wood	4	8	125	58	20.83	0
W Chatterton	12	24	407	53	17.69	0
R Kenward	10	17	285	56	16.76	0
JH Young	3	5	61	42*	15.25	0
W Ellis	7	11	166	58	15.09	0
TA Higson	15	26	340	46	14.16	0
JJ Hulme	18	31	355	59	12.67	0
EM Ashcroft	1	1	11	11	11.00	0
JW Hancock	13	23	227	43*	10.80	0
W Locker	1	2	20	11	10.00	0
A Steeples	1	2	18	16	9.00	0
J Humphries	6	10	64	18*	8.00	0
F Davidson	5	9	62	43	6.88	0
JA Berwick	8	14	66	27	5.50	0
W Bestwick	18	29	91	25	5.05	0
W S Eadie	1	1	5	5	5.00	0
C Middleton	2	4	14	9	4.66	0
W Wilmot	1	2	6	6	3.00	0
F Wright	1	2	4	4	2.00	0
A Warren	1	2	2	1*	2.00	0
GR Gregory	1	1	2	2	2.00	0
LF Ward	1	2	0	0	0.00	0

=== County Championship bowling averages ===
Name	Balls	Runs	Wickets	BB	Average
JJ Hulme	4627	1933	82	7–58	23.57
W Bestwick	2984	1417	48	5–86	29.52
TA Higson	1835	839	27	4–74	31.07
W Storer	955	628	20	5–59	31.40
JA Berwick	820	420	12	5–82	35.00
F Davidson	570	226	11	4–77	20.54
JW Hancock	1030	586	9	3–139	65.11
H Bagshaw	235	120	5	5–18	24.00
JH Young	250	152	3	2–52	50.66
W Ellis	130	63	0		
A Warren	99	79	0		
W Chatterton	75	35	0		
W Sugg	40	41	0		
LG Wright	35	39	0		
A Steeples	30	21	0		
EM Ashcroft	25	11	0		
F Wright	20	37	0		
C Middleton	15	18	0		
Samuel Hill Wood	15	6	0		

== Wicket-keeper ==
- William Storer Catches 16, Stumping 5
- Joe Humphries Catches 14, Stumping 4
- Levi Wright Catches 16, Stumping 1

== See also ==
- Derbyshire County Cricket Club seasons
- 1899 English cricket season
