= Charles Ward (cricketer, born 1838) =

English cricketer

Personal information
- Full name: Charles Bruce Ward
- Born: 20 November 1838; Maulden, Bedfordshire, England
- Died: 9 June 1892 (aged 53); Glossop, Derbyshire, England
- Batting: Unknown
- Relatives: Leonard Ward (son); Charles Ward (nephew); Herbert Ward (nephew)

Domestic team information
- Years: Team
- 1860: Oxford University

Career statistics
Competition	First-class
Matches	1
Runs scored	2
Batting average	2.00
100s/50s	–/–
Top score	2
Catches/stumpings	1/–
- Source: Cricinfo, 6 June 2020

Charles Bruce Ward (20 November 1838 – 9 June 1892) was an English first-class cricketer and clergyman.

The son of The Reverend Charles Ward, he was born in November 1838 at Maulden, Bedfordshire. He was educated at Brighton College, before going up to Oriel College, Oxford. While studying at Oxford, he made a single appearance in first-class cricket for Oxford University against the Marylebone Cricket Club at Oxford in 1860. Batting once in the match, he was dismissed for 2 runs in Oxford's only innings by Will Martingell.

After graduating from Oxford, Ward attended the Wells Theological College 1861 and took holy orders in the Church of England in the same year. His first ecclesiastical post was as curate of Uttoxeter from 1861 to 1862, before taking up the post of curate of Oakamoor from 1862 to 1865. He moved to Lancashire in 1865, where he was curate of Middleton. Returning to the Midlands in 1870, Ward took up the post of curate in charge of Bilston, which he held for a year before taking up the post of vicar at Whitfield, Derbyshire. He held this post until his death at Glossop in June 1892. His son, Leonard, was also a clergyman and first-class cricketer. His nephews Charles Ward and Herbert Ward also played first-class cricket.
