= John Young (cricketer, born 1863) =

English cricketer

Personal information
- Full name: John William Young
- Born: 24 May 1863; Clay Cross, Derbyshire, England
- Died: 9 May 1933 (aged 69); Bolsover, England
- Batting: Right-handed

Domestic team information
- Years: Team
- 1894: Derbyshire
- FC debut: 30 July 1894 Derbyshire v Yorkshire
- Last FC: 9 August 1894 Derbyshire v Leicestershire

Career statistics
Competition	First-class
Matches	2
Runs scored	0
Batting average	0.00
100s/50s	0/0
Top score	0
Catches/stumpings	0/–
- Source: Cricket Archive, March 2012

John William Young (24 May 1863 — 9 May 1933) was an English cricketer who played first-class cricket for Derbyshire in 1894.

Young was born in Clay Cross, Derbyshire, the son of William H Young, a coal miner and his wife Mary. Young himself was a colliery carpenter.

During the 1894 season, Young appeared in two matches which were not part of the County Championship but qualified as first-class matches. These were against Yorkshire and Leicestershire and Derbyshire won both through follow-ons. As a result, Young, batting at the lower-middle-order played one inning in each and failed to score in either.

Young was a right-handed batsman and did not score a single run in his first-class career. He was one of only two Derbyshire batsmen to have an average of 0.00 in the 1894 season, the other being fellow season debutante, William Delacombe.

Young died in Bolsover at the age of 69.
