= Arthur Barton =

Arthur Barton may refer to:

- Arthur Barton (cricketer) (1874–1949), English cricketer
- Arthur W. Barton (1899–1976), headmaster, academic author and football referee
- Arthur Barton (bishop) (1881–1962), Church of Ireland clergyman and Archbishop of Dublin
