= Robert George Tomlinson =

English cricketer and brewer

Robert George Tomlinson (30 March 1869 – 13 January 1949) was an English brewer and cricketer who played for Derbyshire between 1891 and 1893 and was later umpire in first-class matches in Scotland.

Tomlinson was born at Winshill, Derbyshire, the son of Henry George Tomlinson and his wife Cecilia Mary Lowe. His father was a director of Thomas Salt and Company brewers of Burton on Trent. He was educated at Repton School where he played in the first XI and at Magdalen College, Oxford. He entered the family brewing firm of Thomas Salt and Company to become a director, and played cricket for the brewery and for Derbyshire Friars. In the 1891 season he made his debut for Derbyshire and played twice in the 1892 season and twice in the 1893 season when the club's matches were not accorded first-class status. He was described as a good batsman and slow bowler.

Tomlinson married Christiana Alexandrina Agnes Gibson Bowie, daughter of Alexander Gibson Bowie of Edinburgh in 1898. Between 1905 and 1908 he umpired first-class matches in Edinburgh during June and July when Scotland played touring Australians, West Indians and South Africans and English counties.

Tomlinson died at Malvern, Worcestershire, at the age of 79. His son William Tomlinson played first-class cricket for Derbyshire and for Cambridge University. His daughter Wanda married Keith Bullen, one of the Cairo poets. His cousin Alfred Cochrane also played cricket for Derbyshire
