= William Wilmot =

English cricketer

Personal information
- Born: 25 December 1869; Denby, Ripley, Derbyshire, England
- Died: 19 May 1957 (aged 87); Wade Hill, Lancashire, England
- Batting: Right-handed
- Role: Wicket-keeper

Domestic team information
- Years: Team
- 1897–1901: Derbyshire
- FC debut: 31 May 1897 Derbyshire v Warwickshire
- Last FC: 1 July 1901 Derbyshire v London County

Career statistics
Competition	First-class
Matches	10
Runs scored	155
Batting average	11.92
100s/50s	0/0
Top score	25*
Catches/stumpings	11/1
- Source: CricketArchive, April 2012

William Wilmot (25 December 1869 — 19 May 1957) was an English cricketer who played for Derbyshire between 1897 and 1901.

Wilmot was born in Denby, Ripley, Derbyshire, the son of John Wilmot, a labourer, and his wife Elizabeth.

Wilmot made his debut as a wicket-keeper for Derbyshire in the 1897 season, against Warwickshire and made a good account of himself during his remaining four games for the club during the season. In the 1898 season, he played for Lancashire Second XI and returned to the Derbyshire team during the 1899 season. He played one match in the County Championship before Derbyshire played host to the touring Australian cricket team. Despite Wilmot finishing not out from seventh in the batting lineup, Derbyshire lost by an innings margin, thanks to centuries from the Australians' batsmen Hugh Trumble, Monty Noble and Joe Darling, all of whom were past and future Test cricketers for the national side. There was a two-year gap before his next County Championship appearance in the 1901 season when he played one first-class game in July against London County.

Wilmot was a wicket-keeper and took eleven catches and one stumping in ten first-class matches. He was a right-handed batsman and played 16 innings with an average of 11.92 and a top score of 25 not out.

Wilmot died in Wade Hill.
