= John O'Connor (English cricketer) =

English cricketer

Personal information
- Born: 23 February 1867; Pinxton, Derbyshire, England
- Died: 13 July 1936 (aged 69); Cambridge, England
- Batting: Right-handed
- Bowling: Right-arm off-break; Right-arm medium
- Relatives: Jack O'Connor (son); Herbert Carpenter (brother-in-law)

Domestic team information
- Years: Team
- 1900: Derbyshire
- FC debut: 10 May 1900 Derbyshire v Lancashire
- Last FC: 21 June 1900 Derbyshire v Warwickshire

Career statistics
Competition	First-class
Matches	9
Runs scored	55
Batting average	6.11
100s/50s	0/0
Top score	17
Balls bowled	1,259
Wickets	24
Bowling average	25.79
5 wickets in innings	2
10 wickets in match	1
Best bowling	5/56
Catches/stumpings	4/–
- Source: CricketArchive, April 2012

John O'Connor (23 February 1867 – 13 July 1936) was an English cricketer who played for Derbyshire in 1900.

O'Connor was born in Pinxton, Derbyshire (registered as Oconer), the son of William O'Connor a coal miner from Ireland and his wife Mary. At the age of 14 he was a coal mine ganger.

O'Connor's playing career began in 1893 with Cambridgeshire, his first match being against the MCC. He played regularly for Cambridgeshire until 1899 in the Minor Counties Championship and in other matches against MCC. O'Connor also umpired seven first-class cricket matches involving Cambridge University between 1894 and 1896. O'Connor's last game for Cambridgeshire in the 1899 season was against MCC when Arthur Conan Doyle took seven Cambridgeshire wickets although not his.

O'Connor made his debut first-class appearance for Derbyshire in the 1900 season in May against Lancashire when he took 5 wickets in both innings at 5–56 and 5–69. Except in the next match he took a regular haul of wickets for the rest of the season, although he never came near his initial performance. His best batting score was 17 against Hampshire in a 177-run Derbyshire victory at the start of June. O'Connor was a right-arm off-break and medium-pace bowler and took 24 first-class wickets at an average of 15.79 and a best performance of 5 for 56. He was a right-handed tail end batsman and played 14 innings in 9 first-class matches with a top score of 17 and an average of 6.11.

O'Connor umpired two minor county matches in 1902 and one in 1903. He played another minor county season for Cambridgeshire in 1912 and started umpiring first-class matches for Cambridge University again. Apart from a break in the war years he took one or to matches per season, usually against Free Foresters or the Army.

O'Connor died in Cambridge at the age of 69.

His son Jack O'Connor was born at Cambridge in 1897 and played cricket for England and Essex. His brother in law Herbert Carpenter played for Essex.
