= Derbyshire County Cricket Club in 1894 =

1894 season of an English cricket team

Derbyshire County Cricket Club seasons
1894 season
- Captain: Sydney Evershed
- Most runs: George Davidson
- Most wickets: George Davidson
- Most catches: William Storer

Derbyshire Country Cricket Club in 1894 was the cricket season when the English club Derbyshire had been playing for twenty three years. Derbyshire's matches were re-accorded first class status in this season but they did not start to take part in the County Championship until the following season.

== 1894 season ==
The captains of the leading counties determined that in 1894 Derbyshire with Essex, Leicestershire and Warwickshire, should be given first-class status. The match results did not count in the County Championship until 1895, when Hampshire was also admitted. Derbyshire played eleven first-class games including one against MCC. They played three other matches which were against Hampshire and the touring South Africans.

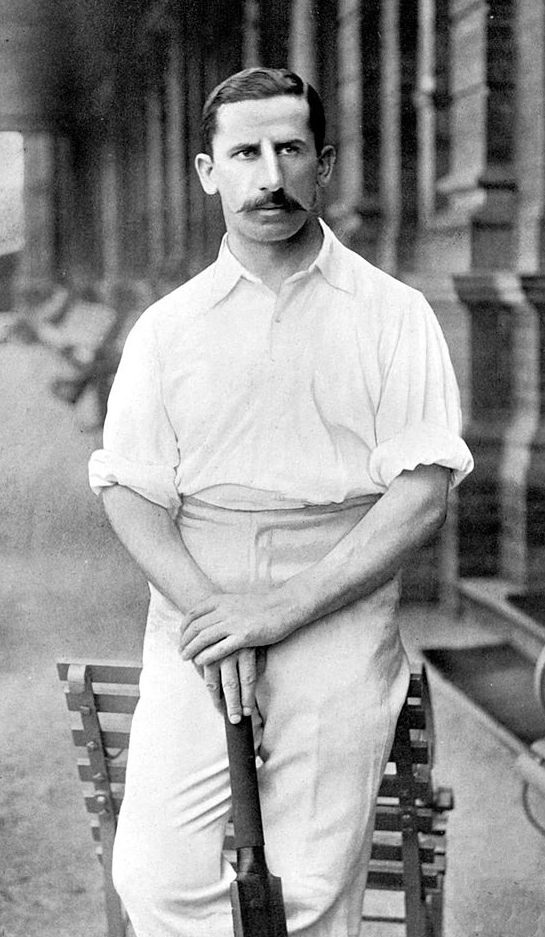
Sydney Evershed - captain

Derbyshire won six of their first class matches and lost four with one drawn. The three other matches were two draws and a loss to Hampshire. Sydney Evershed was in his fourth season as captain. Several players played for other first-class teams, and so the top scorer and wicket-taker in Derbyshire's first-class matches was George Davidson.

Most of the team had played for Derbyshire in the 1887 season or before and had continued playing during the interval. Those who had joined in the interval and made their first-class debuts were Charles Evans, Samuel Malthouse, Daniel Bottom, stand -in wicket-keeper Frank Mycroft and William Delacombe. Those who made their Derbyshire debut in 1894 and played subsequently were Samuel Hill-Wood future MP, baronet and chairman of Arsenal, William Locker footballer and George Marsden lawyer. In addition John Young colliery carpenter played two career first class matches and Albert Widdowson farm hand played one career first class match in the season.

=== Matches ===
List of first class matches
No.	Date	V	Result	Margin	Notes
1	10 May 1894	Surrey; Kennington Oval	Lost	Innings and 40 runs	F Smith 5-43; J J Hulme 5-76; T Richardson 6-17
2	17 May 1894	MCC; Lord's Cricket Ground, St John's Wood	Won	7 wickets	J Rawlin 6-49; G Davidson 6-31 and 5-63
3	11 Jun 1894	Lancashire; County Ground, Derby	Won	5 wickets	J J Hulme 7-15; A Mold 6-21; GG Walker 5-24
4	25 Jun 1894	Warwickshire; County Ground, Derby	Won	10 wickets	
5	02 Jul 1894	Lancashire; Old Trafford, Manchester	Lost	14 runs	A Mold 7-77; G Davidson 7-55; J Briggs 5-68
6	09 Jul 1894	Yorkshire; County Ground, Derby	Lost	3 wickets	J J Hulme 6-94; R Peel 5-64; Hirst 5-53
7	16 Jul 1894	Surrey; County Ground, Derby	Drawn		R Abel 122; G Davidson 5-100; T Richardson 5-52; F Smith 5-34
8	23 Jul 1894	Warwickshire; Edgbaston, Birmingham	Lost	Innings and 80 runs	S Whitehead 7-41 and 5-17; HJ Pallett 5-16
9	30 Jul 1894	Yorkshire; Bramall Lane, Sheffield	Won	9 wickets	G Davidson 8-33; E Wainwright 5-29; J J Hulme 9-27
10	09 Aug 1894	Leicestershire; Grace Road, Leicester	Won	Innings and 36 runs	G Porter 5-14; G Davidson 6-37
11	20 Aug 1894	Leicestershire; County Ground, Derby	Won	8 wickets	G Davidson 5-39 and 5-45; G Hillyard 5-87

List of other matches
No.	Date	V	Result	Margin	Notes
1	14 May 1894	Hampshire; County Ground, Southampton	Drawn		LG Wright 171; J J Hulme 6-65
2	26 Jul 1894	South Africans; County Ground, Derby	Drawn		W Sugg 121; C Sewell 128
3	06 Aug 1894	Hampshire; County Ground, Derby	Lost	5 wickets	J J Hulme 6-78; H Baldwin 5-37 and 6-75;

== Statistics ==
=== First Class batting averages ===
Name	Matches	Inns	Runs	High score	Average	100s
W Chatterton	16	27	611	113	27.77	1
G Davidson	19	30	537	81	21.48	0
W Storer	14	20	297	78*	18.56	0
C Evans	6	9	123	31	17.57	0
J J Hulme	10	16	260	55	17.33	0
W Sugg	11	18	240	70	16.00	0
LG Wright	12	22	268	44	13.40	0
H Bagshaw	7	12	156	44	13.00	0
S Malthouse	8	11	117	38	11.70	0
SH Evershed	4	6	66	34	11.00	0
GA Marsden	8	12	102	34	9.27	0
W Locker	1	2	15	9	7.50	0
GG Walker	11	16	95	38	5.93	0
W S Eadie	4	7	34	18	5.66	0
D Bottom	1	1	5	5	5.00	0
G Porter	4	5	7	5	3.50	0
F Mycroft	1	2	6	4	3.00	0
A Widdowson	1	1	1	1	1.00	0
S Hill-Wood	1	1	1	1*		
WB Delacombe	1	1	0	0	0.00	0
JW Young	2	2	0	0	0.00	0

Wright, Chatterton, Davidson and Walker played for North against South, and Chatterton Davidson and Walker played for Players against Gents. Chatterton Davidson and Storer played for MCC

Leading first-class batsmen for Derbyshire by runs scored
Name	Mat	Inns	Runs	HS	Ave	100
G Davidson	11	17	374	81	22.00 (a)	0
W Storer	10	16	260	78*	16.25 (a)	0
J J Hulme	10	16	260	55	17.33	0
W Sugg	11	18	240	70	16.00	0
W Chatterton	11	17	220		12.94 (a)	

(a) Figures adjusted for non Derbyshire matches

=== First Class bowling averages ===
Name	Balls	Runs	Wickets	BB	Average
G Davidson	4147	1266	97	8-33	13.05
J J Hulme	2221	777	47	9-27	16.53
GG Walker	1366	631	32	7-108	19.71
G Porter	415	115	14	5-14	8.21
C Evans	493	240	13	4-46	18.46
H Bagshaw	235	73	4	4-42	18.25
W Sugg	205	99	4	2-29	24.75
W Chatterton	195	100	0		
WB Delacombe	20	17	0		
S Malthouse	85	26	0		

Leading first class bowlers for Derbyshire by wickets taken
Name	Balls	Runs	Wkts	BBI	Ave
G Davidson	3338	964	79	8-33	12.20 (a)
J J Hulme	2221	777	47	9-27	16.53
GG Walker	932	409	21	5-24	19.48 (a)
G Porter	415	115	14	5-14	8.21
C Evans	493	240	13	4-46	18.46

(a) Figures adjusted for non Derbyshire matches

== Wicket Keeper ==
- William Storer Catches 17, Stumping 5

Storer also kept wicket for MCC taking three catches and three stumpings. Frank Mycroft was stand-in wicket-keeper for one match.

== See also ==
- Derbyshire County Cricket Club seasons
- 1894 English cricket season
