= James Wright (cricketer, born 1874) =

English cricketer

Personal information
- Born: 25 March 1874; Newbold, Leicestershire, England
- Died: 20 August 1961 (aged 87); Sheffield, England
- Batting: Right-handed
- Role: Occasional wicket-keeper

Domestic team information
- Years: Team
- 1898–1905: Derbyshire
- FC debut: 23 May 1898 Derbyshire v Lancashire
- Last FC: 10 August 1905 Derbyshire v Sussex

Career statistics
| Competition | First-class |
|---|---|
| Matches | 6 |
| Runs scored | 93 |
| Batting average | 10.33 |
| 100s/50s | 0/1 |
| Top score | 53* |
| Balls bowled | 50 |
| Wickets | 0 |
| Bowling average | – |
| 5 wickets in innings | – |
| 10 wickets in match | – |
| Best bowling | – |
| Catches/stumpings | 0/– |
- Source: CricketArchive, December 2011

James Wright (25 March 1874 – 20 August 1961) was an English cricketer who played first-class cricket for Derbyshire in 1898 and 1905.

Wright was born at Newbold, Leicestershire, the son of Thomas Wright, a coal miner and his wife Elizabeth. In 1881 they were living at Castle Gresley, Derbyshire. Wright made his debut for Derbyshire against Lancashire in the 1898 season when he scored 2 and 1. However, in the next match, a Derbyshire victory over Hampshire, he made 53 not out. He played a total of five matches in the 1898 season. He played one more game for the club in the 1905 season.

Wright was a right-hand batsman and played ten innings in six first-class matches with an average of 10.33 and a top score of 53 not out. He bowled nine overs but took no wickets. He was also an occasional wicket-keeper.

Wright died at Sheffield, Yorkshire at the age of 87.
