= Herbert Ward (sportsman) =

English footballer and cricketer

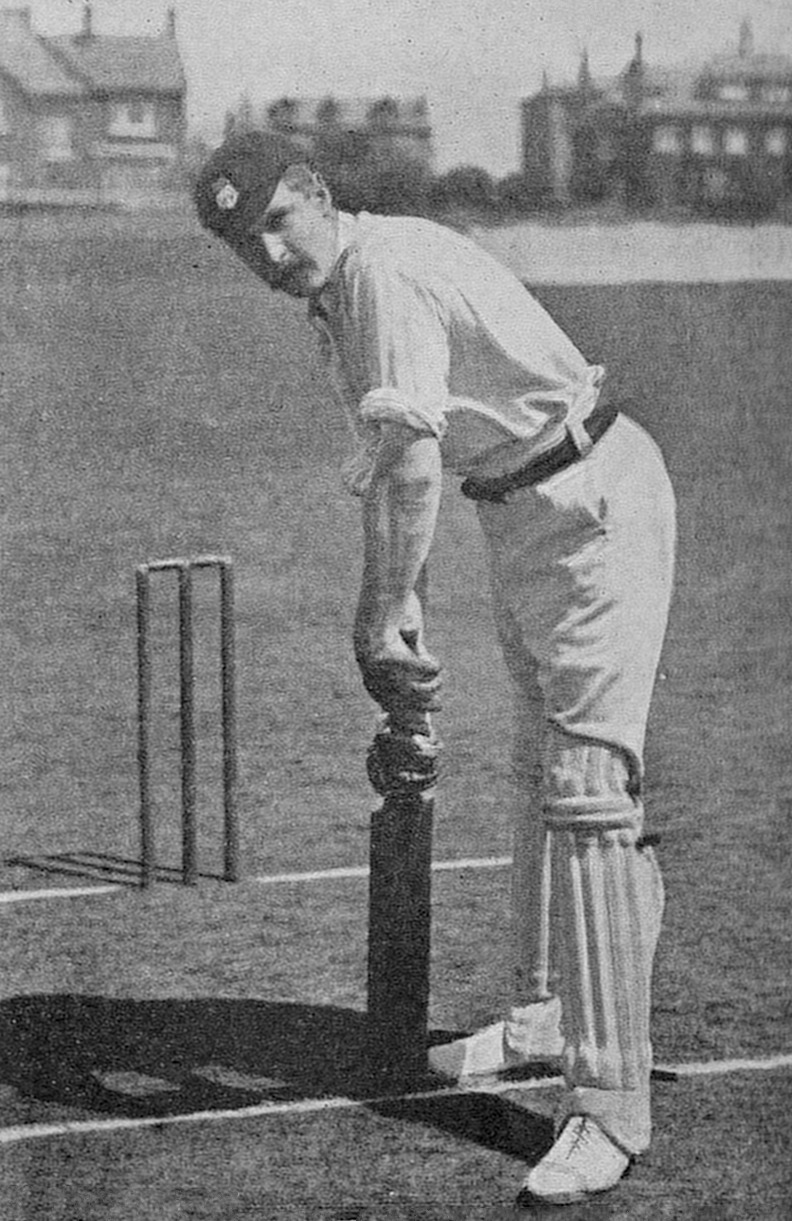
- Ward in 1896

Personal information
- Full name: Herbert Foster Ward
- Born: 24 March 1873; Hammersmith, Middlesex, England
- Died: 6 June 1897 (aged 24); Winchester, Hampshire, England
- Height: 5 ft 10 in (1.78 m)
- Batting: Right-handed
- Bowling: Unknown
- Relatives: Charles Ward (brother); Charles Ward (uncle); Leonard Ward (cousin)

Domestic team information
- Years: Team
- 1895–1897: Hampshire

Career statistics
Competition	First-class
Matches	34
Runs scored	1,367
Batting average	22.04
100s/50s	2/5
Top score	113
Balls bowled	1,033
Wickets	19
Bowling average	29.10
5 wickets in innings	–
10 wickets in match	–
Best bowling	4/17
Catches/stumpings	20/–
Source: Herbert Ward at Cricinfo
6 December 2022
Association football career
- Position: Forward
Senior career*
Years	Team	Apps	(Gls)
1893–1895	Southampton St. Mary's	9	(6)
1895–1897	Geneva Cross	?	(?)
- * Club domestic league appearances and goals

Herbert Foster Ward (24 March 1873 – 6 June 1897) was an English sportsman who played football as a forward for two seasons with Southampton St. Mary's, and as a cricketer who played first-class cricket for Hampshire during its first three seasons in the County Championship. Outside of sport, he was an assistant schoolmaster.

== Early life and football career ==
Ward was born at Hammersmith in March 1873, but grew up in Hertfordshire. He was educated at Bruce Castle School in Tottenham, before training as a schoolteacher. His teaching career took him to Handel College in Southampton.

Ward joined Southampton St. Mary's in 1893, initially as a left winger, and played in Southampton's two FA Cup qualifying matches in November 1893, as well as friendlies and local cup matches. Southampton were founding members of the Southern League in the 1894–95 season, with Ward being asked to take over the role of centre forward during this inaugural season, and was their joint top-scorer for the team during the season, alongside Charles Baker and Jack Angus, having scored six league goals from only nine appearances. During his spell at Southampton, Ward appeared in a total of six FA Cup matches. His most notable performance came against Newbury at the Antelope Ground in the 1894–95 FA Cup, when he scored six goals in Southampton's 14–0 victory. This victory, which remains Southampton's largest in competitive matches, saw Southampton reach the first round proper for the first time, however, they were defeated by Football League First Division opponents Nottingham Forest 4–1, with Ward scoring Southampton's consolation goal. Described as "a tireless worker at all times", his goalscoring abilities earned him five Hampshire County caps, two as captain.

Following the 1894–95 season, Ward stopped playing for Southampton to concentrate on his ambitions to play first-class cricket for Hampshire, who would be playing their inaugural season in the County Championship in 1895. To facilitate that ambition, Ward played football at a less demanding level for Geneva Cross, which was the team affiliated with Netley Hospital.

== Cricket career ==
Having qualified to play for Hampshire by residency, he made his debut in first-class cricket for Hampshire in their inaugural County Championship match in 1895 against Somerset at Taunton; Ward made 71 in Hampshire's second innings, sharing in a partnership of 134 for the fifth wicket with Francis Bacon. This was one of three half centuries he made in 1895, contributing toward his 523 runs from fifteen matches. During the 1896 season, he led the Hampshire bowling attack alongside Charles Robson (who was the secretary–manager of Southampton St Mary's). In eighteen matches in 1896, he took 19 wickets at a bowling average of 24.47, with best figures of 4 for 17. He also had a successful season with the bat, scoring 765 runs and making two centuries, with scores of 100 against Essex and 113 against Derbyshire. During the 1896 season, he played for Charles de Trafford's eleven against the touring Australians.

Ward played in Hampshire's opening match of the 1897 County Championship against Lancashire. However, seventeen days after this match, Ward died at Northwood Park near Winchester on 6 June, where he had been employed as an assistant master. His cause of death was initially thought to be sunstroke, but it was subsequently diagnosed as a combination of typhoid fever and meningitis.

His brother, Charles, played first-class cricket for Hampshire, while his cousin Leonard Ward, and uncle Charles Ward, also played first-class cricket.

== Works cited ==
- Chalk, Gary; Holley, Duncan; Bull, David (2013). All the Saints: A Complete Players' Who's Who of Southampton FC. Bristol: Hagiology Publishing. ISBN 9780992686406.
- Chalk, Gary; Holley, Duncan (1987). Saints – A complete record. Derby: Breedon Books. ISBN 0907969224.
- Holley, Duncan; Chalk, Gary (1992). The Alphabet of the Saints. Leicester: ACL & Polar Publishing. ISBN 0951486233.
