= Edward Houseman =

English cricketer (1869–1942)

Personal information
- Full name: Edward Outram Houseman
- Born: 19 March 1869; Dronfield, Derbyshire, England
- Died: 10 April 1942 (aged 73); Westhoughton, Lancashire, England
- Batting: Right-handed

Domestic team information
- Years: Team
- 1897: Derbyshire
- Only FC: 3 June 1897 Derbyshire v Lancashire

Career statistics
Competition	First-class
Matches	1
Runs scored	6
Batting average	2.00
100s/50s	0/0
Top score	4
Catches/stumpings	2/–
- Source: CricketArchive, April 2012

Edward Outram Houseman (19 March 1869 – 10 April 1942) was an English cricketer. who played for Derbyshire in one game during the 1897 season.

Houseman was born in Dronfield, Derbyshire. His only game for Derbyshire was against Lancashire in the 1897 season. He was out for a duck in the first innings and scored four runs in the second in a match which Derbyshire lost by a one-wicket margin. Houseman was a right-handed batsman.

In 1893 Houseman married Ada Ingham in the Prsecot district and by 1904 they had moved to Westhoughton, Lancashire. In 1910 their son Edward was killed in the Pretoria Pit Disaster and is commemorated on a plaque erected by the Bolton and District Cricket Association on the face of Westhoughton Town Hall.

Houseman died at Westhoughton at the age of 73.
