= Derbyshire County Cricket Club in 1898 =

1898 season of an English cricket team

Derbyshire County Cricket Club seasons
1898 season
- Captain: Sydney Evershed
- County Championship: 9
- Most runs: William Storer
- Most wickets: George Davidson
- Most catches: William Storer

Derbyshire County Cricket Club in 1898 was the cricket season when the English club Derbyshire had been playing for twenty-seven years. It was their fourth season in the County Championship and they won three matches to finish ninth in the Championship table.

== 1898 season ==
Derbyshire played sixteen games in the County Championship in 1898 and one match against MCC. The captain for the year was Sydney Evershed in his eighth season as captain. William Storer was top scorer with three centuries which he achieved while also bowling to take 28 wickets and being a useful wicket-keeper. George Davidson took most wickets at 65 as well as scoring a century. The season saw many high scores, and against Hampshire in August, four Derbyshire players Levi Wright, William Storer, William Chatterton and George Davidson scored centuries followed by two more from the Hampshire players in the same match. The Derbyshire total of 645 runs was to remain their highest match score until it was surpassed in the 2007 season. Two matches later, Yorkshire set a record score against Derbyshire of 662 runs when Jack Brown scored 300 and John Tunnicliffe 243 in Walter Sugg's benefit match before Brown deliberately knocked down his wicket. It remained a national partnership record until two more Yorkshiremen, Percy Holmes and Herbert Sutcliffe, made 555 for the first wicket against Essex at Leyton in 1932.

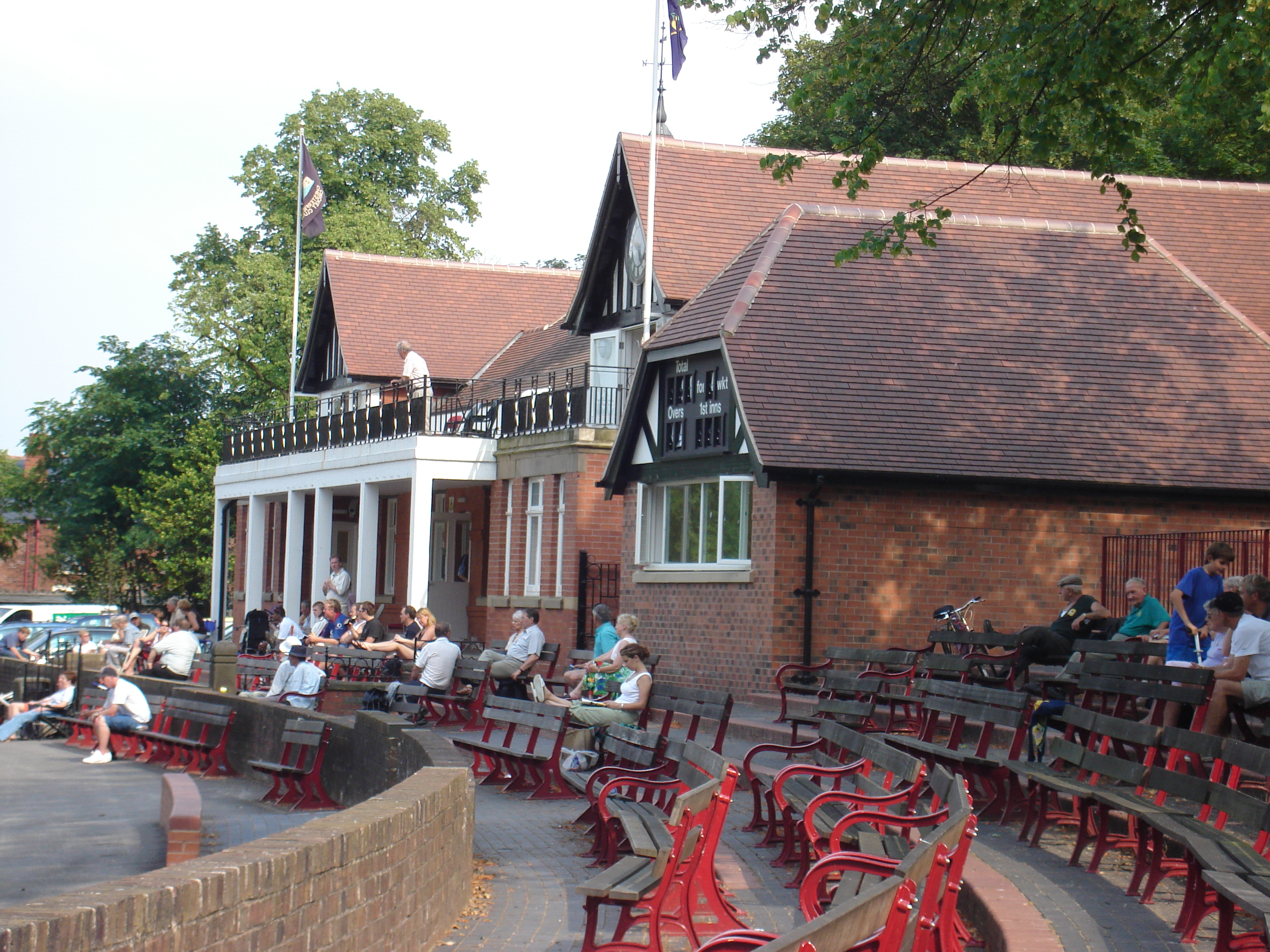
Queen's Park, Chesterfield, first used in 1898

The Yorkshire match was Derbyshire's second match at Queen's Park, Chesterfield, the first being earlier in the season against Surrey. The size of the crowd at that game made the experiment well worthwhile and the ground, described as more pleasing to the eye than the County Ground, became a regular venue for several matches a season. The game against Surrey was not without incident as superb lob bowling by D. L. A. Jephson, gave him nine Derbyshire wickets for 55 runs in the two innings, Derbyshire supporters were upset by Jephson's lobs, and protested vigorously against them, saying that this was unfair bowling.

The most significant addition to the Derbyshire squad in the season was Billy Bestwick as well known for his antics off the pitch as his demon bowling. William Ellis played the first of several seasons at the club when he played occasional games. Alfred Charlesworth and James Wright also made their debuts and played several matches in the season, although only Wright played in a subsequent season. William Prince, John Bourne and Solomon Hardy each played just one career match for Derbyshire in the season

=== Matches ===
List of matches
No.	Date	V	Result	Margin	Notes
1	16 May 1898	Nottinghamshire; Trent Bridge, Nottingham	Drawn		W Storer 109
2	19 May 1898	Surrey; Kennington Oval	Abandoned		
3	23 May 1898	Lancashire; County Ground, Derby	Lost	65 runs	JJ Hulme 6-65; Cuttell 5-30; Briggs 5-34; Mold 5-27
4	30 May 1898	Hampshire; County Ground, Southampton	Won	10 wickets	W Storer 104
5	09 Jun 1898	MCC; Lord's Cricket Ground, St John's Wood	Won	Innings and 1 run	G Davidson 6-30 and 6-53; J Hearne 6-66
6	16 Jun 1898	Warwickshire; Edgbaston, Birmingham	Drawn		Quaife 109; Lilley 112
7	20 Jun 1898	Essex; County Ground, Leyton	Lost	129 runs	G Davidson 7-42 and 8-74
8	27 Jun 1898	Leicestershire; County Ground, Derby	Won	Innings and 31 runs	Pougher 5-53; F Davidson 6-36; G Davidson 5-31
9	30 Jun 1898	Surrey; Queen's Park, Chesterfield	Lost	Innings and 43 runs	Jephson 6-38
10	04 Jul 1898	Essex; County Ground, Derby	Lost	Innings and 172 runs	Perrin 104; McGahey 115; Kortright 5-44; Bull 6-75
11	11 Jul 1898	Nottinghamshire; County Ground, Derby	Drawn		F Davidson 6-49
12	25 Jul 1898	Warwickshire; County Ground, Derby	Drawn		SH Evershed 153; Field 5-107
13	28 Jul 1898	Yorkshire; St George's Road, Harrogate	Drawn		H Bagshaw 100; JW Hancock 5-61
14	01 Aug 1898	Hampshire; County Ground, Derby	Drawn		LG Wright 134; W Storer 100; W Chatterton 142; G Davidson 108 and 6-42; Poore 121; Quinton 101 and 5-93
15	15 Aug 1898	Leicestershire; Grace Road, Leicester	Lost	Innings and 103 runs	Geeson 6-64 and 7-38
16	18 Aug 1898	Yorkshire; Queen's Park, Chesterfield	Lost	Innings and 387 runs	J Brown 300; J Tunnicliffe 243
17	25 Aug 1898	Lancashire; Old Trafford, Manchester	Drawn		J Tyldesley 200; Cuttell 5-48

== Statistics ==
=== County Championship batting averages ===
Name	Matches	Inns	Runs	High score	Average	100s
W Storer	15	25	1113	109	50.59	3
SH Evershed	13	23	729	153	33.13	1
W Chatterton	14	23	648	142	30.85	1
H Bagshaw	13	21	481	100*	24.05	1
G Davidson	14	21	457	108	21.76	1
LG Wright	15	26	541	134	21.64	1
EM Ashcroft	4	6	95	60	19.00	0
H Blackwell	3	4	38	15	19.00	0
W Sugg	15	23	323	50	14.68	0
J Wright	5	8	87	53*	12.42	0
A Charlesworth	7	10	92	23	10.22	0
GG Walker	6	9	62	25	7.75	0
W Ellis	3	5	28	16*	7.00	0
F Davidson	8	14	67	19	6.70	0
JJ Hulme	2	3	13	9*	6.50	0
JJ Bourne	1	1	6	6	6.00	0
JW Hancock	11	14	50	19	5.55	0
S Hardy	1	2	10	9	5.00	0
D Bottom	1	2	8	7	4.00	0
GA Marsden	3	5	14	5	2.80	0
W Bestwick	8	11	22	5*	2.75	0
E Evershed	1	1	1	1	1.00	0
SH Wood	1	1	4	4*	0	
W Prince	1	1	2	2*	0	

=== County Championship bowling averages ===
Name	Balls	Runs	Wickets	BB	Average
G Davidson	3682	1020	65	8-74	15.69
F Davidson	2054	844	32	6-36	26.37
W Storer	1470	995	28	4-121	35.53
JW Hancock	1511	720	23	5-61	31.30
JJ Hulme	500	152	12	6-65	12.66
GG Walker	965	630	9	4-199	70.00
W Bestwick	765	430	8	4-163	53.75
H Bagshaw	430	241	7	2-5	34.42
W Chatterton	650	255	6	4-32	42.50
W Sugg	345	197	5	3-25	39.40
H Blackwell	175	105	4	2-23	26.25
JJ Bourne	265	103	3	2-63	34.33
D Bottom	123	50	1	1-50	50.00
W Prince	125	38	0		
A Charlesworth	60	47	0		
EM Ashcroft	50	31	0		
J Wright	50	16	0		
LG Wright	50	36	0		
W Ellis	30	12	0		
SH Evershed	30	28	0		

== Wicket Keeper ==
- W Storer Catches 24, Stumping 1
- W Chatterton Catches 13, Stumping 1
- LG Wright Catches 10, Stumping 2

== See also ==
- Derbyshire County Cricket Club seasons
- 1898 English cricket season
