= Herbert Carpenter =

English cricketer and umpire

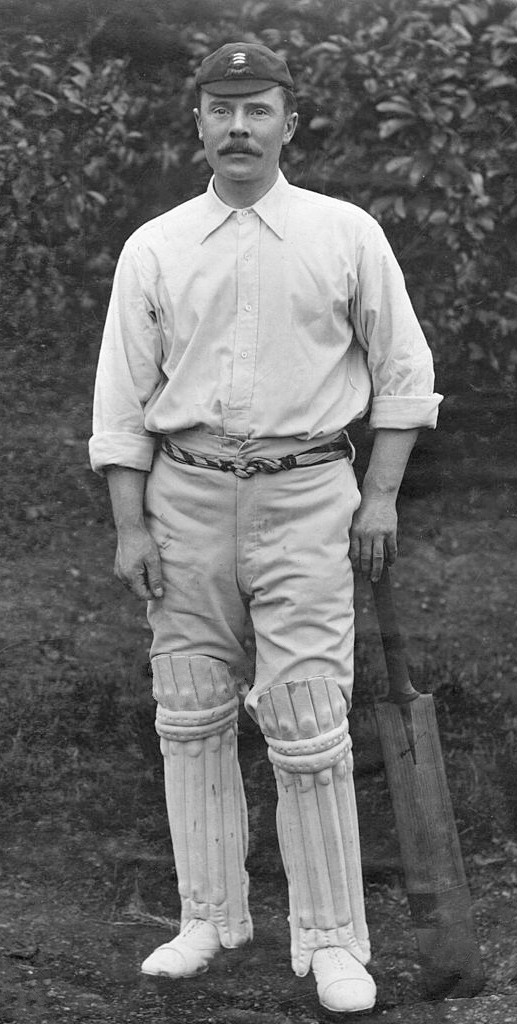

Personal information
- Full name: Herbert Arthur Carpenter
- Born: 12 July 1869; Cambridge, Cambridgeshire, England
- Died: 12 December 1933 (aged 64); Whipps Cross, England
- Batting: Right-handed
- Bowling: Right-arm off break
- Relatives: Robert Carpenter (father); John O'Connor (brother-in-law); Jack O'Connor (nephew); George Carpenter, (uncle); William Carpenter (uncle)

Domestic team information
- Years: Team
- 1893–1906: MCC
- 1894–1920: Essex
- 1896–1902: Players
- 1896: Earl de la Warr's XI
- 1896–1897: South
- 1913: Cambridgeshire

Career statistics
Competition	First-class
Matches	310
Runs scored	14,939
Batting average	28.45
100s/50s	25/68
Top score	199
Balls bowled	3,871
Wickets	50
Bowling average	44.92
5 wickets in innings	0
10 wickets in match	0
Best bowling	4/57
Catches/stumpings	257/0
- Source: CricketArchive, 12 February 2012

Herbert Arthur Carpenter (12 July 1869 – 12 December 1933) was an English first-class cricketer and umpire who played principally for Essex in a career which spanned from 1893 to 1920.

== Cricket career ==
Carpenter came from a cricketing family and was the son of Cambridgeshire's Robert Carpenter. He made his Essex debut in 1888 and his consistent batting helped the county achieve first-class status in 1894. Carpenter scored 1000 runs in a season on seven occasions. In 1900, he amassed 1,742 runs including five centuries. His career at Essex spanned 27 years scoring 13,043 runs in 262 matches at an average of 29.50.
