= Frank Davidson =

English cricketer (1872–1951)

Personal information
- Full name: Frank Davidson
- Born: 1 October 1872; Brimington, Derbyshire, England
- Died: 7 June 1951 (aged 78); Chesterfield, England
- Batting: Right-handed
- Bowling: Right-arm medium

Domestic team information
- Years: Team
- 1897–1899: Derbyshire
- FC debut: 30 August 1897 Derbyshire v Warwickshire
- Last FC: 19 June 1899 Derbyshire v Nottinghamshire

Career statistics
Competition	First-class
Matches	14
Runs scored	129
Batting average	6.58
100s/50s	0/0
Top score	43
Balls bowled	2,674
Wickets	43
Bowling average	25.44
5 wickets in innings	2
10 wickets in match	0
Best bowling	6/36
Catches/stumpings	11/–
- Source: CricketArchive, February 2011

Frank Davidson (1 October 1872 – 7 June 1951) was an English first-class cricketer who played for Derbyshire between 1897 and 1899.

Davidson was born in Brimington, Derbyshire, the son of Josh Davidson, a coal miner and his wife Elizabeth. His father played one game annually for Derbyshire from 1871 to 1875.

Davidson's first-class career began for Derbyshire in the 1897 season. His brother George had been playing for the club since 1886 and the brothers appeared together in his debut in August 1897 playing against Warwickshire. There was another pair of brothers Willie Quaife and Walter Quaife on the Warwickshire side, but the match was abandoned part way through the first innings. That was Davidson's his only match in the 1897 season, but he played more fully in the 1898 season. In his opening game against Essex he took five catches and a wicket, while his brother George achieved a match wicket haul of 15. In his next match against Leicestershire, he achieved his best bowling performance of 6 for 36, with a match wicket total of 9. Against Nottinghamshire he took 6 for 49 and a match total of 8. He took wickets regularly in the remaining matches of the season and took many catches from his brother's bowling, but his batting scores were low. At the beginning of 1899 George Davidson died of pneumonia and in the 1899 season Frank Davidson played five matches. Against Hampshire he achieved his best batting score of 43 and took steady wickets, but in subsequent matches his bowling and batting performance declined and he played his last game in June.

Davidson was a right-arm medium pace bowler and took 43 first-class wickets at an average of 25.44 and a best performance of 6 for 36. He was a right-hand batsman and played 23 innings in 14 first-class matches with an average of 6.78 and a top score of 43.

Davidson died at Chesterfield, Derbyshire, at the age of 78.
