= Albert Widdowson =

English cricketer

Personal information
- Full name: Albert Widdowson
- Born: 31 March 1864; Bingham, Nottinghamshire, England
- Died: 28 April 1938 (aged 74); Duffield, Derbyshire, England

Domestic team information
- Years: Team
- 1894: Derbyshire
- Only FC: 16 July 1894 Derbyshire v Surrey

Career statistics
Competition	First-class
Matches	1
Runs scored	1
Batting average	1.00
100s/50s	0/0
Top score	1
Catches/stumpings	0/–
- Source: CricketArchive, March 2012

Albert Widdowson (31 March 1864 – 28 April 1938) was an English cricketer who played for Derbyshire in 1894.

Widdowson was born in Bingham, Nottinghamshire and in 1881 was working on a farm. He played one match Derbyshire in the 1894 season in July against Surrey in which he made one run.

Widdowson was identified as a Scorer for Derbyshire in 1927. He died in Duffield at the age of 74.
