= John Bourne (cricketer) =

English cricketer

Personal information
- Full name: John James Bourne
- Born: 2 November 1872; Moira, Leicestershire, England
- Died: 23 December 1952 (aged 80); Burton-on-Trent, England
- Batting: Left-handed
- Bowling: Left-arm medium

Domestic team information
- Years: Team
- 1898: Derbyshire
- Only FC: 11 July 1898 Derbyshire v Nottinghamshire

Career statistics
Competition	First-class
Matches	1
Runs scored	6
Batting average	6.00
100s/50s	0/0
Top score	6
Balls bowled	265
Wickets	3
Bowling average	34.33
5 wickets in innings	0
10 wickets in match	0
Best bowling	2/63
Catches/stumpings	0/–
- Source: CricketArchive, 3 November 2022

John James Bourne (2 November 1872 – 23 December 1952) was an English cricketer who played first-class cricket for Derbyshire in 1898.

Bourne was born at Moira, Leicestershire, the son of Thomas Bourne, a colliery manager and his wife Rose. They lived at Church Gresley where he was a colliery clerk in 1891.

Bourne, with fellow one-timer William Prince, played one match for Derbyshire in the 1898 season which was against Nottinghamshire in July. He was a left-arm medium-pace bowler and took three wickets in over 40 overs during the match. As a left-handed batsman, he batted for just a single innings in the tailend to make 6 runs.

Bourne died in Burton-on-Trent at the age of 80.
