= George Marsden (cricketer) =

English cricketer

Personal information
- Full name: George Allen Marsden
- Born: 28 June 1869; Wirksworth, Derbyshire, England
- Died: 7 January 1938 (aged 68); Cape Province, South Africa
- Batting: Right-handed
- Bowling: Right-arm leg-break

Domestic team information
- Years: Team
- 1894–1898: Derbyshire
- FC debut: 17 May 1894 Derbyshire v MCC
- Last FC: 15 August 1898 Derbyshire v Leicestershire

Career statistics
Competition	First-class
Matches	30
Runs scored	417
Batting average	10.42
100s/50s	0/0
Top score	37
Catches/stumpings	12/–
- Source: CricketArchive, March 2012

George Allen Marsden (28 June 1869 – 7 January 1938) was an English cricketer who played for Derbyshire County Cricket Club between 1894 and 1898.

Marsden was born in Wirksworth, the son of George Marsden a printer and auctioneer and his wife Anne Allen. In 1891 he was an articled law student.

Marsden started playing for Derbyshire in the 1894 season and took part in several first-class games before they formally joined County Championship in the 1895 season. His debut in the championship was against Warwickshire in June 1895, which Derbyshire won by 200 runs, although Marsden's contribution was small. Marsden played regularly for the full 1896 season. He played one game in the 1897 season and three in the 1898 season. Marsden was a right-handed batsman and played 46 innings in 30 first-class matches with a top score of 37 and an average of 10.42. Although a leg-break bowler, he did not bowl in any first-class game.

Marsden died in Cape Province, South Africa, at the age of 68.
