= Somercotes =

Village in Derbyshire, England

Coordinates: 53.079°N 1.367°W

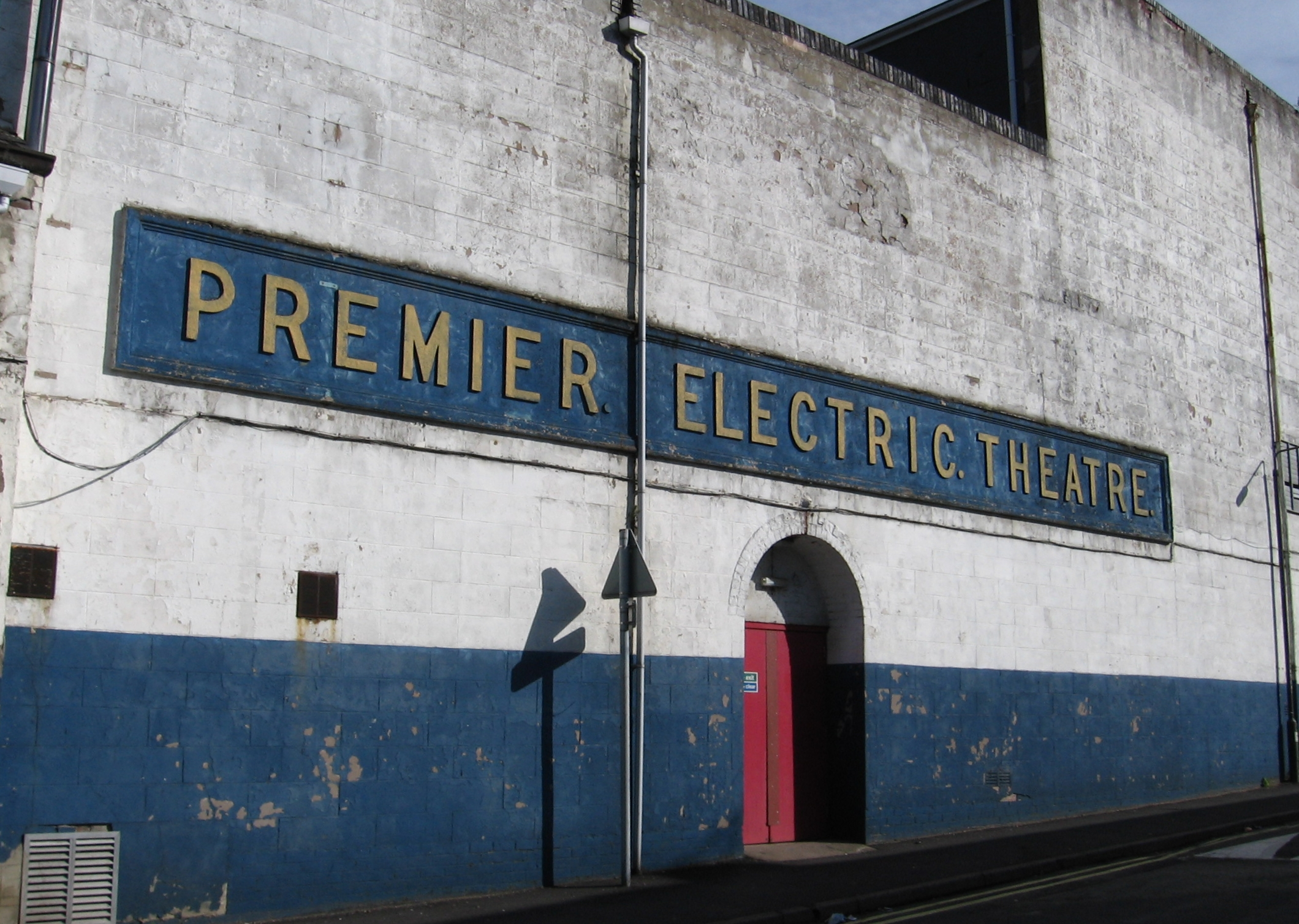
- Somercotes Bingo Hall (Formerly Premier Electric Theatre)

- Location within Derbyshire
- Population: 6,503 (Including Leabrooks and Lower Birchwood. 2021)
- OS grid reference: SK4253
- District: Amber Valley
- Shire county: Derbyshire
- Region: East Midlands
- Country: England
- Sovereign state: United Kingdom
- Post town: ALFRETON
- Postcode district: DE55
- Dialling code: 01773
- Police: Derbyshire
- Fire: Derbyshire
- Ambulance: East Midlands

Somercotes is a village and civil parish in the district of Amber Valley in the English county of Derbyshire, close to the border with Nottinghamshire. It is a former mining village and was once surrounded by more than five pits. The village has numerous shops, pubs, food outlets and other businesses. It has industrial areas at Cotes Park and Birchwood. Whilst increasingly urbanised, there is still some agricultural land in the northern and western parts of the parish, and a small nature reserve at Pennytown Ponds. It has primary and secondary schools, along with the Church of St. Thomas and a Methodist church. The population at the 2011 census was 6,255, up almost 9% from 5,745 in 2001 (figures for the 'ward', which may include Leabrooks).

== History ==
The earliest known spelling of Somercotes was Sumcot, which was recorded in 1225. This derives from the original use of the area for seasonal grazing, when temporary huts or 'summer cottages' were used by herdsmen. The original settlement was in what is now known as Lower Somercotes, the upper village developing much later after a turnpike road was driven through to Alfreton in the eighteenth century. The area was within the Norman Manor of Alfreton, and later within the Alfreton Urban District. The fortunes of the village were to be based on the coal mining industry, which rapidly expanded in the 19th century. Pye Hill and Somercotes railway station used to serve the village until it was closed by Beeching in the 1960s. Clothing manufacture was a significant local employer until quite recently, with English Rose and Aertex having factories in the area.

== Cricketers ==
Several cricketers from Somercotes played for Derbyshire.

- George Beet, Sr. (1886–1946)
- George Beet, Jr. (1904–1949)
- Malcolm Beevers (1913– 1996)
- Joseph Burton (1873–1940)
- William Prince (1868–1948)
- William Rigley (1852–1897)
- Fred Root (1890–1954)
- Denis Smith (1907–1979)
- Albert Steeples (1870–1945)
- Dick Steeples (1873–1946)

== Notable people ==
- Frederick Gibson (born 1907), footballer who played 242 games
- Peter Heathfield (1929–2010), trade unionist who was general secretary of the National Union of Mineworkers (NUM) between 1984 and 1992
