= Derbyshire County Cricket Club in 1891 =

1891 season of an English cricket team

Derbyshire County Cricket Club seasons
1891 season
- Captain: Sydney Evershed
- Most runs: William Chatterton
- Most wickets: George Davidson
- Most catches: William Storer

Derbyshire County Cricket Club in 1891 was the cricket season when the English club Derbyshire had been playing for twenty years. Derbyshire's matches were not considered to be first class in this season. The club had lost first class status after 1887 and did not regain it until 1894, the year before they joined the County Championship. However many of the players competed for the club earlier or subsequently at first-class level.

== 1891 season ==
Derbyshire played twelve games, all against sides that they had played in first class matches before 1888 or that joined the County Championship four years later. Sydney Evershed took over the captaincy from Fred Spofforth who made his one last appearance during the year. William Chatterton was top scorer making a century against Yorkshire. George Davidson topped the bowling with 61 wickets.

William Taylor noted that during Derbyshire's period in exile many fine players wore their colours including S H Evershed, who in captained the eleven with marked ability for many years and the grand veteran, Levi Wright – "a magnificent batsman and unsurpassed as a fieldsman in the oldfashioned position of square-point". With Evershed, and his brother Edward, William Eadie and Robert Tomlinson, the team was well represented by brewers of Burton.

=== Matches ===
List of matches
| No. | Date | V | Result | Margin | Notes |
|---|---|---|---|---|---|
| 1 | 7 May 1891 | Nottinghamshire; Trent Bridge, Nottingham | Lost | 10 Wickets | Flowers 100; G Davidson 5-111 |
| 2 | 18 May 1891 | Leicestershire; County Ground, Derby | Lost | Innings and 75 runs | Pougher 135; Walton 6-74 |
| 3 | 25 May 1891 | Surrey; County Ground, Derby | Abandoned | | |
| 4 | 8 Jun 1891 | Yorkshire; Headingley, Leeds | Won | 45 runs | |
| 5 | 15 Jun 1891 | Nottinghamshire; County Ground, Derby | Lost | 7 wickets | |
| 6 | 22 Jun 1891 | Essex; County Ground, Leyton | Lost | 9 wickets | J J Hulme 5-82; Mead 6-47; Pickett 5-39 |
| 7 | 29 Jun 1891 | Yorkshire; County Ground, Derby | Drawn | | W Chatterton 106; G Porter 5-52; Peel 5-67 |
| 8 | 6 Jul 1891 | Warwickshire; County Ground, Derby | Drawn | | J J Hulme 7-56; Shilton 5-57; Pallett 5-51 |
| 9 | 16 Jul 1891 | MCC; Lord's Cricket Ground, St John's Wood | Won | 4 wickets | G Davidson 5-65 |
| 10 | 20 Jul 1891 | Surrey; Kennington Oval | Won | 10 wickets | G Davidson6-41; G Porter 6-61; W W Read 5-31 |
| 11 | 3 Aug 1891 | Leicestershire; Grace Road, Leicester | Won | 58 runs | S Raynor 5-57; Pougher 5-33; |
| 12 | 10 Aug 1891 | Warwickshire; Edgbaston, Birmingham | Won | 9 wickets | G Davidson5-47; G Porter 5-34 and 5-34; Pallett 5-36 |
| 13 | 17 Aug 1891 | Essex; County Ground, Derby | Won | 7 wickets | G Davidson6-24 and 5-33; J J Hulme 5-45; Pickett 7-59 |

== Statistics ==
=== Batting averages ===
| Name | Matches | Inns | Runs | High score | Average | 100s |
|---|---|---|---|---|---|---|
| W Chatterton | 12 | 22 | 763 | 106 | 34.68 | 1 |
| H Bagshaw | 10 | 18 | 386 | 86 | 21.44 | 0 |
| Fred Spofforth | 1 | 2 | 42 | 32 | 21.00 | 0 |
| LG Wright | 8 | 16 | 319 | 71 | 19.93 | 0 |
| R G Tomlinson | 1 | 2 | 38 | 22 | 19.00 | 0 |
| SH Evershed | 8 | 13 | 224 | 51 | 17.23 | 0 |
| W L Shipton | 1 | 2 | 34 | 32 | 17.00 | 0 |
| W Storer | 12 | 23 | 360 | 51 | 15.65 | 0 |
| W Sugg | 12 | 24 | 328 | 81 | 13.67 | 0 |
| G Davidson | 12 | 21 | 245 | 43 | 11.67 | 0 |
| W Hall | 6 | 9 | 95 | 37 | 10.55 | 0 |
| S Malthouse | 7 | 14 | 155 | 37 | 10.28 | 0 |
| HA Morley | 1 | 2 | 20 | 12 | 10.00 | 0 |
| GG Walker | 5 | 7 | 56 | 22 | 8.00 | 0 |
| S Thorpe | 4 | 8 | 63 | 35 | 7.87 | 0 |
| E Evershed | 2 | 3 | 22 | 15 | 7.33 | 0 |
| W S Eadie | 4 | 7 | 51 | 20 | 7.28 | 0 |
| J J Hulme | | 10 | 69 | 20 | 6.80 | 0 |
| G Porter | 9 | 12 | 68 | 29 | 5.67 | 0 |
| H F Wright | 2 | 3 | 11 | 8 | 3.67 | 0 |
| W Myton | 1 | 2 | 6 | 4 | 3.00 | 0 |
| S Raynor | 4 | 7 | 18 | 6 | 2.57 | 0 |
| R Wright | 1 | 3 | 8 | 7 | 2.67 | 0 |
| D Bottom | 1 | 2 | 4 | 4 | 2.00 | 0 |
| W W Wood-Sims | 1 | 1 | 1 | 1 | 1.00 | 0 |

=== Bowling averages ===
| Name | Balls | Runs | Wickets | BB | Average |
|---|---|---|---|---|---|
| G Davidson | | 957 | 61 | 6–24 | 15.69 |
| G Porter | | 466 | 36 | 6–61 | 12.94 |
| J J Hulme | | 461 | 34 | 5–45 | 13.56 |
| S Raynor | | 175 | 8 | 5–57 | 21.87 |
| W Sugg | | 104 | 6 | 4–65 | 17.33 |
| W Chatterton | | 182 | 5 | 2–15 | 36.4 |
| S Malthouse | | 108 | 4 | 4–68 | 27.00 |
| W Hall | | 63 | 3 | 2–36 | 21.00 |
| Fred Spofforth | | 106 | 2 | 2–106 | 53.00 |
| D Bottom | | 36 | 0 | | |
| S Thorpe | | 31 | 0 | | |
| SH Evershed | | 11 | 0 | | |
| GG Walker | | 111 | 0 | | |
| H Bagshaw | | 26 | 0 | | |
| R Wright | | 23 | 0 | | |

== Wicket-keeper ==
- W Storer

== See also ==
- Derbyshire County Cricket Club seasons
- 1891 English cricket season
