= James Oldknow =

English cricketer (1873–1944)

Personal information
- Born: 12 March 1873; Denby, Derbyshire, England
- Died: 10 September 1944 (aged 71); Belper, England
- Batting: Right-handed
- Bowling: Right-arm medium

Domestic team information
- Years: Team
- 1901: Derbyshire
- FC debut: 20 May 1901 Derbyshire v Yorkshire
- Last FC: 30 May 1901 Derbyshire v Surrey

Career statistics
Competition	First-class
Matches	2
Runs scored	7
Batting average	2.33
100s/50s	0/0
Top score	4*
Balls bowled	252
Wickets	4
Bowling average	40.50
5 wickets in innings	0
10 wickets in match	0
Best bowling	3/123
Catches/stumpings	2/–
- Source: CricketArchive, April 2012

James Oldknow (12 March 1873 – 10 September 1944) was an English cricketer who played first-class cricket for Derbyshire in 1901.

Oldknow was born in Denby, Derbyshire, the son of William Wheatcroft Oldknow, a coal miner, and his wife Jane.

Oldknow made his first-class debut for Derbyshire in the 1901 season in a game in May against Yorkshire, when he took 3 wickets for 123 in the first innings. He took a wicket and two catches in his next and last game against Surrey. Oldknow was a right-arm medium-pace bowler and took 4 first-class wickets at an average of 40.50 and a best performance of 3–123. He was a right-handed batsman and played 4 innings in 2 first-class matches at an average of 2.33 and a highest score of 7 not out.

Oldknow died in Belper at the age of 71.
