= William Locker =

English footballer and cricketer

Personal information
- Full name: William Locker
- Date of birth: 16 February 1866
- Place of birth: Long Eaton, England
- Date of death: 15 August 1952 (aged 86)
- Place of death: California, Derby, England
- Position: Inside left

Senior career*
Years	Team	Apps	(Gls)
1885–1888	Long Eaton Rangers		
1888–1889	Notts County	0	(0)
1889	Stoke	1	(0)
1889	Notts Olympic		
1889–1890	Derby County	0	(0)
1890–1892	Notts County	21	(12)
1891	Loughborough		
1892	Long Eaton Rangers		
- * Club domestic league appearances and goals

William Locker
Cricket information
- Batting: Right-handed

Domestic team information
- Years: Team
- 1894–1903: Derbyshire
- FC debut: 10 May 1894 Derbyshire v Surrey
- Last FC: 21 May 1903 Derbyshire v MCC

Career statistics
Competition	First-class
Matches	16
Runs scored	511
Batting average	17.03
100s/50s	0/2
Top score	76
Catches/stumpings	4/–
- Source: CricketArchive, February 2012

William Locker (16 February 1866 – 15 August 1952) was an English footballer and cricketer. He played first-class cricket for Derbyshire between 1894 and 1903 and football for Stoke, Derby County and Notts County. He was one of nineteen sportsmen to achieve the Derbyshire Double of playing cricket for Derbyshire and football for Derby County.

Locker was born in Long Eaton, Derbyshire, the son of William Locker and his wife Mary. His father was a lace maker and at the age of 15 Locker was a lace threader.

== Football career ==
Locker played association football for Stoke, Derby County and Notts County. His only appearance for Stoke came in a 2–1 defeat at home to Preston North End in November 1889. Whilst with Notts County, he achieved 12 goals in the 1890/91 season, and played in the 1891 FA Cup final on the losing side.

== Cricket career ==
Locker made his first appearances for Derbyshire in the 1894 season. He next played for them in one match in the 1899 season which was his County Championship debut – an innings defeat by Worcestershire. He played fully for Derbyshire in the 1901 season. He played one match in the 1902 season and one in the 1903 season. He was a right-handed batsman who played 30 innings in 16 matches with a top score of 76 and an average of 17.03. During his time with Derbyshire, he was an upper-middle order batsman.

Locker died in California, Derby aged 86.

== Career statistics ==
Appearances and goals by club, season and competition
Club	Season	League			FA Cup		Total	
Club	Season	Division	Apps	Goals	Apps	Goals	Apps	Goals
Stoke	1889–90	The Football League	1	0	0	0	1	0
Notts County	1890–91	The Football League	21	12	6	2	27	14
Notts County	1891–92	The Football League	0	0	1	0	1	0
Career total			22	12	7	2	29	14

== Honors ==
Notts County

- FA Cup finalists: 1891

== See also ==
- List of English cricket and football players
