= William Ellis (English cricketer) =

English cricketer

Personal information
- Born: 28 August 1876; Whitwell, Derbyshire, England
- Died: 22 January 1931 (aged 54); Crimble Moor, Slaithwaite, Huddersfield, England

Domestic team information
- Years: Team
- 1898–1906: Derbyshire
- FC debut: 16 May 1898 Derbyshire v Nottinghamshire
- Last FC: 25 June 1906 Derbyshire v Nottinghamshire

Career statistics
Competition	First-class
Matches	18
Runs scored	361
Batting average	12.03
100s/50s	0/1
Top score	58
Balls bowled	244
Wickets	0
Bowling average	–
5 wickets in innings	–
10 wickets in match	–
Best bowling	–
Catches/stumpings	7/–
- Source: CricketArchivr, April 2012

William Ellis (28 August 1876 – 22 January 1931) was an English cricketer who played for Derbyshire between 1898 and 1906.

Ellis was born in Whitwell, the son of Thomas Ellis, a joiner, and his wife Jane.

Ellis' first-class cricketing career began for Derbyshire in the 1898 season, making his debut against Nottinghamshire in the County Championship. He made two further appearances during the season, against Lancashire and Essex. In the 1899 season he played in seven games and scored his only half-century, against Leicestershire. He played three matches in the 1901 season one against London County and the others in the County Championship. He played in five matches in the 1903 season and one final first-class game, in the 1906 season.

Ellis was a lower-order batsman for the team playing 32 innings in 18 Matches. His highest score was 58 and he averaged 12.03. He was also an occasional, though unsuccessful bowler, as he never took a first-class wicket.

Ellis died at Crimble Moor at the age of 55.
