= John Young (cricketer, born 1876) =

English cricketer

Personal information
- Full name: John Henry Young
- Born: 2 July 1876; Melbourne, Derbyshire, England
- Died: 2 August 1913 (aged 37); Melbourne, England
- Batting: Right-handed
- Bowling: Right-arm medium-fast

Domestic team information
- Years: Team
- 1899–1901: Derbyshire
- FC debut: 8 June 1899 Derbyshire v Yorkshire
- Last FC: 29 August 1901 Derbyshire v Leicestershire

Career statistics
| Competition | First-class |
|---|---|
| Matches | 28 |
| Runs scored | 379 |
| Batting average | 9.71 |
| 100s/50s | 0/0 |
| Top score | 42* |
| Balls bowled | 1,967 |
| Wickets | 28 |
| Bowling average | 35.57 |
| 5 wickets in innings | 1 |
| 10 wickets in match | 0 |
| Best bowling | 5/65 |
| Catches/stumpings | 3/– |
- Source: Cricket Archive, April 2012

John Henry Young (2 July 1876 – 2 August 1913) was an English cricketer who played for Derbyshire County Cricket Club between 1899 and 1901.

Young was born in Melbourne, Derbyshire, the son of Mark Young, a joiner, and his wife Emily. Young made his debut for Derbyshire in the 1899 season in June against Yorkshire when he made a duck in both innings and took no wickets in a short spell of bowling. He played three matches in the season and made his top-score of 42 not out against Worcestershire in his final match that year.

Young played more regularly throughout the 1900 season, and matched his previous season's high against Leicestershire. He also gained his best bowling figures of 5 for 65 against London County, and took 4 wickets against Nottinghamshire. In the 1901 season he played more matches than in any other season, but his batting and bowling performances failed to match previous seasons.

Young was a right-arm medium-fast bowler and took 28 first-class wickets at an average of 35.57 and with a best performance of 5 for 65. He was a right-handed batsman and played 48 innings in 28 first-class matches with an average of 9.71 and a top score of 42 not out.

Young died at Melbourne at the age of 37. He was related to James Horsley who also played for Derbyshire.
