= Malcolm Beevers =

English cricketer and soldier

Personal information
- Full name: Malcolm Schofield Beevers
- Born: 4 September 1913; Pye Bridge, Derbyshire, England
- Died: 20 December 1996 (aged 83); Wrington, Somerset, England
- Batting: Right-handed
- Bowling: Leg break

Domestic team information
- Years: Team
- 1934/35: Central Provinces and Berar
- 1934/35: Europeans

Career statistics
Competition	First-class
Matches	2
Runs scored	15
Batting average	3.75
100s/50s	–/–
Top score	10
Balls bowled	120
Wickets	1
Bowling average	94.00
5 wickets in innings	–
10 wickets in match	–
Best bowling	1/61
Catches/stumpings	–/–
- Source: ESPNcricinfo, 27 October 2023

Malcolm Schofield Beevers (4 September 1913 – 20 December 1996) was an English first-class cricketer and British Indian Army officer.

Beevers was born in September 1913 at Pye Bridge, Derbyshire. He served in the British Army in India as a Private with the 2nd Battalion, York and Lancaster Regiment. In late 1934, Beevers made two appearances in first-class cricket. The first of these came for the Europeans cricket team against the Hindus at Bombay in the 1934–35 Bombay Quadrangular. His second came for Central Provinces and Berar against Central India at Nagpur in the 1934–35 Ranji Trophy; it was in the latter match that he took his only first-class wicket, that of C. S. Nayudu. Beevers was serving as a Sergeant when he received his emergency commission as an commission in the British Indian Army during the Second World War, being appointed a second lieutenant on 28 May 1942. He saw action in the Burma campaign with the 25th and later 26th Indian Division Ordnance Field Park's. He joined the Burma Star association in 1981.

Returning to England after the war, Beevers was appointed to an emergency commission in the Royal Army Ordnance Corps in July 1949 with the rank of captain and his seniority antedated to July 1944. He was promoted to major in October 1957, and upon the completion of his service in September 1960, he was made an honorary major. He later served in the Territorial Army with the East Anglian Regiment, before resigning his commission in March 1967. Beevers died in December 1996 at Wrington, Somerset.
