= Derbyshire County Cricket Club in 1900 =

1900 season of an English cricket team

Derbyshire County Cricket Club seasons
1900 season
- Captain: Samuel Hill Wood
- County Championship: 13
- Most runs: William Storer
- Most wickets: John Hulme
- Most catches: William Storer

Derbyshire County Cricket Club in 1900 was the cricket season when the English club Derbyshire had been playing for twenty-nine years. It was their sixth season in the County Championship and they won three matches to finish thirteenth in the Championship table.

== 1900 season ==
Derbyshire played eighteen games in the County Championship in 1900, two matches against London County and one match against MCC. They also played a match against the touring West Indies.

They only won two matches in the County Championship but a higher number of draws brought them up to 13 in the table. The captain for the year was Samuel Hill Wood in his second season as captain.

William Storer was top scorer, passing Bagshaw's Championship lead by a century against MCC. John Hulme took most wickets overall although Bestwick had more in the Championship. One high-scoring match was against Essex when Levi Wright and William Storer reached 170 and two Essex players scored centuries. Play did not start until three o'clock on the third day. Derbyshire had to play a second innings but declared when Young was out second ball. There was still insufficient time to avoid a draw.

Derbyshire played a non-status match against the touring West Indies which ended in a draw. The West Indies opening batsman Charles Ollivierre decided to stay in England and joined Derbyshire in a later season once the residence requirements were met.

The most significant addition to the Derbyshire squad in the season was Samuel Cadman a valuable all-rounder and eventually coach. Albert Lawton also made his debut and went on to play for the club for many seasons. Other players who made their debut but played only in 1900 were John O'Connor one of the top bowlers for the season, William Foulke better known as an outsize footballer, Hubert Pink and Walter Stubbings. Frank Barrs also played one match in the following season.

=== Matches ===
List of first-class matches
No.	Date	V	Result	Margin	Notes
1	10 May 1900	Lancashire; Old Trafford, Manchester	Lost	96 runs	J O'Connor 5-56 and 5-69; Webb 6-25; Mold 5-20
2	17 May 1900	Surrey; County Ground, Derby	Lost	10 wickets	LG Wright 134; Hayward 120; WC Smith 5-50; Lees 7-38
3	21 May 1900	Yorkshire; Bramall Lane, Sheffield	Drawn		Rhodes 7-72
4	24 May 1900	MCC; Lord's Cricket Ground, St John's Wood	Won	107 runs	W Storer 175; A Hearne 5-38
5	28 May 1900	Nottinghamshire; Trent Bridge, Nottingham	Lost	5 wickets	Gunn 6-76; Wass 6-58
6	04 Jun 1900	Hampshire; County Ground, Southampton	Won	177 runs	Soar 5-76; H Bagshaw 5-27; Baldwin 5-31
7	07 Jun 1900	London County Cricket Club; Crystal Palace Park	Lost	5 wickets	Braund 7-52; JH Young 5-65; Trott 6-68
8	14 Jun 1900	London County Cricket Club; County Ground, Derby	Drawn		JJ Hulme 6-27; Sladen 5-50
9	21 Jun 1900	Warwickshire; North Road Ground, Glossop	Drawn		
10	25 Jun 1900	Yorkshire County Ground, Derby	Lost	Innings and 24 runs	Rhodes 7-32; Haigh 6-54
11	28 Jun 1900	Essex; County Ground, Leyton	Drawn		LG Wright 170; W Storer 176; Carpenter 112; McGahey 122; JJ Hulme 5-125
12	02 Jul 1900	Worcestershire; Queen's Park, Chesterfield	Won	57 runs	Wilson 6-55; W Bestwick 5-53 and 5-34; JJ Hulme 5-54
13	23 Jul 1900	Warwickshire; Edgbaston, Birmingham	Drawn		Devey 256; Kinneir 156
14	26 Jul 1900	Leicestershire; County Ground, Derby	Drawn		AE Lawton 124; JH King 121; CJB Wood 116; Geeson 7-107
15	30 Jul 1900	Lancashire; North Road Ground, Glossop	Lost	224 runs	JT Tyldesley 119; CR Hartley 109; W Bestwick 6-55 and 5–102; Cuttell 5-64; Briggs 5-31
16	06 Aug 1900	Hampshire; County Ground, Derby	Drawn		
17	09 Aug 1900	Worcestershire; County Ground, New Road, Worcester	Drawn		W Storer 114
18	13 Aug 1900	Essex; County Ground, Derby	Drawn		HA Carpenter 151; TM Russell 139; EM Ashcroft 139; Mead 5-57; Reeves 5-44; W Bestwick 7-114
19	20 Aug 1900	Nottinghamshire; Queen's Park, Chesterfield	Lost	165 runs	Wass 5-62
20	27 Aug 1900	Leicestershire; Grace Road, Leicester	Lost	Innings and 34 runs	CJB Wood 147; Woodcock 5-24
21	30 Aug 1900	Surrey; Kennington Oval	Drawn		R Abel 193; DLA Jephson 213

List of other matches
No.	Date	V	Result	Margin	Notes
1	19 Jul 1900	West Indies; County Ground, Derby	Drawn		Goodman 104; Cox 5-61; JJ Hulme 6-76

== Statistics ==
=== County Championship batting averages ===
Name	Matches	Inns	Runs	High score	Average	100s
SH Evershed	1	2	108	62	54.00	0
W Storer	18	30	952	176	34.00	2
H Bagshaw	18	31	976	98	31.48	0
LG Wright	18	31	907	170	31.27	2
EM Ashcroft	9	14	309	139	25.75	1
W Chatterton	18	31	654	64	23.35	0
Samuel Hill Wood	14	21	348	81*	20.47	0
FA Barrs	2	3	61	58	20.33	0
AE Lawton	15	24	433	124	18.82	1
JA Berwick	2	3	27	16	13.50	0
W Sugg	6	10	107	34	11.88	0
JJ Hulme	17	24	246	53	11.71	0
WH Foulke	4	7	65	53	10.83	0
SWA Cadman	2	3	32	23	10.66	0
JH Young	9	14	120	42	10.00	0
JW Hancock	3	5	42	18	8.40	0
W Stubbings	1	2	9	9*	9.00	0
J Humphries	12	19	117	22	8.35	0
W Bestwick	18	25	118	39	6.94	0
WB Delacombe	2	3	15	11	5.00	0
HS Pink	3	5	24	11	4.80	0
J O'Connor	6	9	27	17	3.85	0

Leading first-class batsmen for Derbyshire by runs scored
Name	Mat	Inns	Runs	HS	Ave	100
W Storer	21	35	1255	176	35.86	3
H Bagshaw	21	36	1055	98	29.31	0
LG Wright	20	34	1040	170	30.59	2
W Chatterton	21	36	743	64	20.64	0
AE Lawton	18	29	610	124	21.03	1

(a) Figures adjusted for non CC matches

Irvine Dearnaley who played for Derbyshire five years later and George Slater who never appeared in another match were members of the team against the West Indies.

=== County Championship bowling averages ===
Name	Balls	Runs	Wickets	BB	Average
W Bestwick	3735	1662	66	7-114	25.18
JJ Hulme	4040	1618	59	5-54	27.42
H Bagshaw	1336	686	27	5-27	25.40
J O'Connor	839	396	19	5-56	20.84
W Storer	924	669	15	4-43	44.60
JH Young	496	203	9	4-3	22.55
JA Berwick	378	227	5	4-74	45.40
JW Hancock	307	117	5	3-36	23.40
AE Lawton	234	146	4	2-15	36.50
WH Foulke	114	92	2	2-15	46.00
LG Wright	24	11	1	1-4	11.00
FA Barrs	24	17	1	1-17	17.00
SWA Cadman	90	58	1	1-58	58.00
EM Ashcroft	96	78	1	1-5	78.00
W Chatterton	288	115	1	1-17	115.00
W Stubbings	120	80	0		
HS Pink	36	33	0		
Samuel Hill Wood	30	30	0		

Leading first class bowlers for Derbyshire by wickets taken
Name	Balls	Runs	Wkts	BBI	Ave
JJ Hulme	4782	1919	76	6-27	25.25
W Bestwick	4171	1813	73	7-114	24.84
H Bagshaw	1660	840	35	5-27	24.00
J O'Connor	1259	619	24	5-56	25.79
W Storer	1020	740	19	4-43	38.95

== Wicket Keeping ==
- William Storer Catches 19, Stumping 4
- Joe Humphries Catches 13, Stumping 4

== See also ==
- Derbyshire County Cricket Club seasons
- 1900 English cricket season
