= Dick Steeples =

English cricketer

Personal information
- Full name: Richard Steeples
- Born: 30 April 1873; Somercotes, Derbyshire, England
- Died: 2 August 1946 (aged 73); Somercotes, Derbyshire, England
- Batting: Right-handed
- Bowling: Right-arm medium-fast
- Relatives: Albert Steeples (brother)

Domestic team information
- Years: Team
- 1897: Derbyshire
- 1897–1908: Monmouthshire
- FC debut: 14 June 1897 Derbyshire v Yorkshire
- Last FC: 16 August 1897 Derbyshire v Leicestershire

Career statistics
Competition	First-class
Matches	3
Runs scored	20
Batting average	4.00
100s/50s	0/0
Top score	16
Balls bowled	530
Wickets	9
Bowling average	23.77
5 wickets in innings	0
10 wickets in match	0
Best bowling	4/73
Catches/stumpings	1/–
- Source: CricketArchive, April 2012

Richard Steeples (30 April 1873 – 2 August 1946), was an English cricketer who played for Derbyshire in 1897.

Steeples was born at Somercotes, Alfreton, Derbyshire, the son of John Steeples, a coal miner.

Steeples enjoyed a brief first-class career, playing three matches at county level during the 1897 season when the club was short of regular bowlers. He made his debut against Yorkshire, in which he took three wickets, but Derbyshire lost the game by a single wicket. Steeples played just two more times in first-class cricket for Derbyshire, and took four wickets against Nottinghamshire.

Steeples was a right-handed batsman and played five innings in three first-class matches with an average of 4 and a top score of 16. He was a right-arm medium-fast bowler and took nine first-class wickets at an average of 23.77 and a best performance of 4 for 73.

Steeples appeared on a regular basis in Minor Counties cricket for Monmouthshire from 1897 to 1908. He also played various miscellaneous games in South Wales.

Steeples died in Somercotes at the age of 73. His brother, Albert, played one game for Derbyshire during the 1899 season.
