= Hubert Pink =

English cricketer (1878–1946)

Personal information
- Full name: Hubert Selwyn Pink
- Born: 12 November 1878; Chapel-en-le-Frith, Derbyshire, England
- Died: 25 November 1946 (aged 68); Chapel-en-le-Frith, Derbyshire, England
- Batting: Right-handed

Domestic team information
- Years: Team
- 1900: Derbyshire
- FC debut: 10 May 1900 Derbyshire v Lancashire
- Last FC: 21 May 1900 Derbyshire v Yorkshire

Career statistics
Competition	First-class
Matches	3
Runs scored	24
Batting average	4.80
100s/50s	0/0
Top score	11
Balls bowled	36
Wickets	0
Bowling average	–
5 wickets in innings	–
10 wickets in match	–
Best bowling	–
Catches/stumpings	0/–
- Source: CricketArchive, April 2012

Hubert Selwyn Pink (12 November 1878 – 25 November 1946) was an English cricketer who played for Derbyshire during the 1900 season.

Pink was born in Chapel-en-le-Frith, the son of Rev. Samuel H Pink, curate of Chapel-en-le-Frith, and his wife Frances. Pink played three matches for Derbyshire during the 1900 season, debuting against Lancashire in May 1900 when he made a modest account of himself. In the following week against Surrey, Pink was given a chance to bowl when Surrey needed only 40 in their second innings to win, but took no wickets. His last match against Yorkshire was a draw and he only played one innings. Pink was a right-handed batsman and played 5 innings in 3 first-class matches with an average of 4.80 and a top score of 11. In bowling he took 0 for 27.

During World War I Pink was a 2nd Lieutenant (acting Captain) in the Sherwood Foresters. In 1919 he was awarded the Military Cross. A later edition noted the circumstances "For great gallantry and skill in leading his company in the attack on the St. Quentin Canal on 29 September 1918. In spite of the very thick fog and gas shelling, he kept his company up to time, and under enfilade machine-gun fire and artillery barrage took his men over in fine style. His company took their objective splendidly, swinging round on the way to charge a field gun battery still in action.Having arrived at his objective, he pushed his advanced platoons into Lehaucourt, taking several prisoners".

Pink died in Chapel-en-le-Frith at the age of 68.
