= Herbert Bostock =

English cricketer

Personal information
- Born: 4 May 1869; Ilkeston, England
- Died: 20 February 1954 (aged 84); Ilkeston, England
- Batting: Right-handed

Domestic team information
- Years: Team
- 1897: Derbyshire
- FC debut: 10 June 1897 Derbyshire v MCC
- Last FC: 30 August 1897 Derbyshire v Warwickshire

Career statistics
Competition	First-class
Matches	4
Runs scored	75
Batting average	18.75
100s/50s	0/0
Top score	36
Catches/stumpings	1/–
- Source: CricketArchive, April 2012

Herbert Bostock (4 May 1869 – 20 February 1954) was an English cricketer who played for Derbyshire in 1897.

Bostock was born in Ilkeston of a mining family, and was a child when his father died. Bostock made his debut for Derbyshire in the 1897 season against Marylebone Cricket Club, in which he scored nine runs from the opening order. He played three more first-class games in the season in the County Championship. His career high score of 36 against Nottinghamshire put him high in the club's championship batting averages.

Bostock was a right-handed batsman and played six innings in four first-class matches with a top score of 36 and an average of 18.75

Bostock died at Ilkeston.
