= John Purdy (cricketer) =

English cricketer

Personal information
- Full name: John Henry Purdy
- Born: 23 September 1871; Brimington, Derbyshire, England
- Died: 19 May 1938 (aged 66); Mansfield, England
- Batting: Right-handed
- Relatives: Henry Purdy (nephew)

Domestic team information
- Years: Team
- 1896–1906: Derbyshire
- FC debut: 25 June 1896 Derbyshire v Yorkshire
- Last FC: 12 July 1906 Derbyshire v Nottinghamshire

Career statistics
| Competition | First-class |
|---|---|
| Matches | 9 |
| Runs scored | 39 |
| Batting average | 4.33 |
| 100s/50s | 0/0 |
| Top score | 10* |
| Balls bowled | 750 |
| Wickets | 9 |
| Bowling average | 34.44 |
| 5 wickets in innings | 0 |
| 10 wickets in match | 0 |
| Best bowling | 3/53 |
| Catches/stumpings | 4/– |
- Source: CricketArchive, April 2012

John Henry Purdy (23 September 1871 – 19 May 1938) was an English cricketer who played for Derbyshire between 1896 and 1906.

Purdy was born in Brimington, Derbyshire, the son of William Purdy, a bricklayer and his wife Elizabeth. He made his debut for Derbyshire in the 1896 season, against Yorkshire. Purdy took the last wicket before the close of play in a drawn match. He played in four more games during the 1896 season. Purdy made just three more appearances for Derbyshire after 1896, in the 1897, 1901 and 1906 seasons. In 1906 his appearance overlapped the debut of his nephew, Henry Purdy. Purdy was a right-arm fast-medium bowler who took 9 first-class wickets at an average of 34.44 and a best performance of 3–53. He was a right-handed batsman who played 13 innings in 9 matches in the middle-lower. His top score was 10 not out and his average 4.33.

Purdy died in Mansfield. Purdy's nephew, Henry Purdy, played first-class cricket for Derbyshire between 1906 and 1919.
