= Frank Wright (cricketer, born 1870) =

English cricketer (1870–1943)

Personal information
- Full name: Frank Moult Wright
- Born: 4 May 1870; Ilkeston, Derbyshire, England
- Died: 9 December 1943 (aged 73); Cotmanhay, England
- Batting: Right-handed

Domestic team information
- Years: Team
- 1899: Derbyshire
- Only FC: 4 May 1899 Derbyshire v Surrey

Career statistics
Competition	First-class
Matches	1
Runs scored	4
Batting average	2.00
100s/50s	0/0
Top score	4
Balls bowled	20
Wickets	0
Bowling average	–
5 wickets in innings	–
10 wickets in match	–
Best bowling	–
Catches/stumpings	0/–
- Source: CricketArchive, April 2012

Frank Wright (4 May 1870 – 9 December 1943) was an English cricketer who played first-class cricket for Derbyshire in 1899.

Wright was born in Ilkeston, Derbyshire. He was also identified as "Francis Moult Wright". Wright played just one first-class cricket match for Derbyshire during the 1899 season, against Surrey. He was a right-handed batsman and scored four runs in the first innings and a duck in the second. He bowled under four overs in the first innings of the match taking no wickets and giving 37 runs. Derbyshire lost the game by a ten-wicket margin.

Wright died in Cotmanhay at the age of 73.
