= Frank Barrs =

English cricketer

Personal information
- Full name: Frank Arthur Barrs
- Born: 23 April 1871; Repton Park, Derbyshire, England
- Died: 16 December 1963 (aged 92); Vancouver, British Columbia, Canada
- Batting: Left-handed
- Bowling: Left-arm fast

Domestic team information
- Years: Team
- 1900–1901: Derbyshire
- FC debut: 17 May 1900 Derbyshire v Surrey
- Last FC: 13 June 1901 Derbyshire v Worcestershire

Career statistics
Competition	First-class
Matches	3
Runs scored	68
Batting average	13.60
100s/50s	0/1
Top score	68
Balls bowled	36
Wickets	1
Bowling average	29.00
5 wickets in innings	0
10 wickets in match	0
Best bowling	1/17
Catches/stumpings	0/–
- Source: CricketArchive, April 2012

Frank Arthur Barrs (24 April 1871 – 16 December 1963) was an English cricketer who played for Derbyshire in 1900 and 1901.

Barrs was born in Repton Park, the son of Henry Barrs, a farmer and his wife Elizabeth. He made his Derbyshire debut in the 1900 season in May against Surrey and in his first innings scored his best innings total of 58. He made ten more runs in his career in one further match in 1900 and a single game in the 1901 season.

Barrs was a left-handed batsman and played five innings in three first class matches with an average of 13.6 and a top score of 58. He was a left-arm fast bowler and took one wicket in six overs at a cost of 29 runs.

Barrs emigrated to South Dakota in 1908 and after 3 months went on to Vancouver, British Columbia, Canada. He played a match for Vancouver against the Australians in 1913. He lived for the rest of his life in Vancouver where he died aged 92.
