= Joseph Hancock (cricketer) =

English cricketer (1876–1939)

Personal information
- Full name: Joseph William Hancock
- Born: 26 November 1876; Old Tupton, Derbyshire, England
- Died: 23 May 1939 (aged 62); Rotherham, England
- Batting: Left-handed
- Bowling: Left-arm medium

Domestic team information
- Years: Team
- 1897–1900: Derbyshire
- FC debut: 10 May 1897 Derbyshire v Lancashire
- Last FC: 23 July 1906 Scotland v West Indies

Career statistics
Competition	First-class
Matches	48
Runs scored	459
Batting average	7.91
100s/50s	0/0
Top score	43*
Balls bowled	5,636
Wickets	94
Bowling average	29.73
5 wickets in innings	1
10 wickets in match	0
Best bowling	5/61
Catches/stumpings	21/–
- Source: CricketArchive, November 2011

Joseph William Hancock (26 November 1876 – 23 May 1939) was an English first-class cricketer who played for Derbyshire from 1897 to 1900 and for Scotland in 1906.

Hancock was born at Old Tupton, Derbyshire, the son of Alfred Hancock, a coal miner, and his wife Eliza. Hancock made his debut for Derbyshire in the 1897 season aged 20. In May against Lancashire he took 4 wickets at a cost of 140 runs. He played regularly for the next three years. In the 1898 season he achieved his best bowling performance with 5 for 61 against Yorkshire. The 1899 season was Hancock's best for batting, when his average reached 11.43 and he scored 43 not out against Hampshire. Hancock left Derbyshire in 1900 after playing three matches in the 1900 season. He turned out for Scotland in 1906 against the West Indies.

Hancock was a left-arm medium pace bowler and took 94 first-class wickets at an average of 29.73 and a best performance of 5 for 61. He was a left-hand batsman and played 77 innings in 48 first-class matches with an average of 7.91 and a top score of 43 not out.

Hancock died at Clifton, Rotherham, Yorkshire, at the age of 62.
