= Henry Blackwell (cricketer) =

English cricketer

Personal information
- Full name: Henry Blackwell
- Born: 16 December 1876; Wirksworth, Derbyshire, England
- Died: 24 January 1900 (aged 23); Wirksworth, England
- Batting: Right-handed
- Bowling: Right-arm medium

Domestic team information
- Years: Team
- 1895–1898: Derbyshire
- FC debut: 20 May 1895 Derbyshire v MCC
- Last FC: 28 July 1898 Derbyshire v Yorkshire

Career statistics
Competition	First-class
Matches	4
Runs scored	41
Batting average	10.25
100s/50s	0/0
Top score	15
Balls bowled	175
Wickets	4
Bowling average	26.25
5 wickets in innings	0
10 wickets in match	0
Best bowling	2/23
Catches/stumpings	1/–
- Source: CricketArchive, March 2012

Henry Blackwell (16 December 1876 – 24 January 1900) was an English cricketer who played for Derbyshire in 1895 and 1898.

Blackwell was born at Wirksworth Derbyshire, the son of William Blackwell, a butcher and his wife Fanny. He debuted for Derbyshire at the age of eighteen, in the 1895 season, against Marylebone Cricket Club, but didn't play another first-class match until the 1898 season. He played in three drawn matches in 1898, taking a wicket in every game and making reasonable scores as a lower-order batsman. He did not play in 1899 but died at Wirksworth at the beginning of 1900 at the age of 23.

Blackwell was a right-arm medium-pace bowler and took four first-class wickets at an average of 26.25 and a best performance of 2 for 23. He was a right-handed batsman and played six innings in four first-class matches with an average of 10.25 and a top score of 15.
