= Jack O'Connor (English cricketer) =

English cricketer

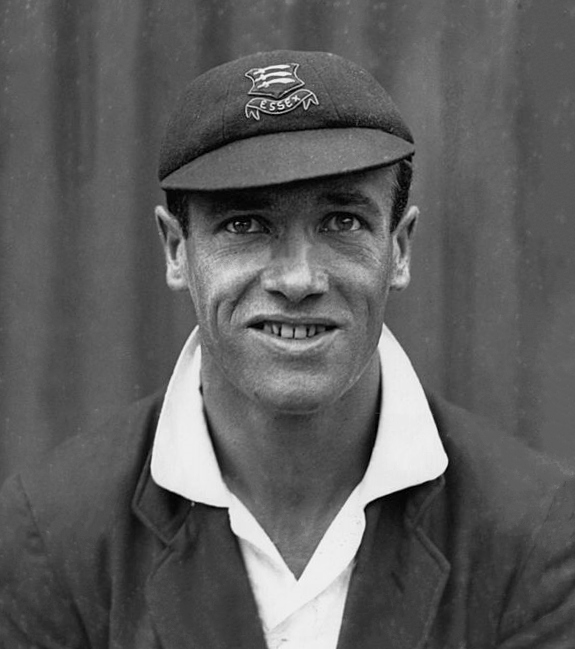
- O'Connor in 1925

Personal information
- Born: 6 November 1897; Cambridge, England
- Died: 22 February 1977 (aged 79); Buckhurst Hill, Essex, England
- Batting: Right-handed
- Bowling: Right-arm legbreak

International information
- National side: England
- Test debut: 29 June 1929 v South Africa
- Last Test: 3 April 1930 v West Indies

Career statistics
Competition	Test	First-class
Matches	4	540
Runs scored	153	28,764
Batting average	21.85	34.90
100s/50s	0/1	72/129
Top score	51	248
Balls bowled	162	39,783
Wickets	1	557
Bowling average	72.00	32.89
5 wickets in innings	0	18
10 wickets in match	0	2
Best bowling	1/31	7/52
Catches/stumpings	2/–	226/1
- Source: ESPNcricinfo, 7 November 2022

Jack O'Connor (6 November 1897 – 22 February 1977) was an English cricketer who played in four Tests from 1929 to 1930.

O'Connor was the son of John O'Connor who played for Derbyshire and nephew of Herbert Carpenter who played for Essex. O'Connor's was a mainstay of the Essex county side between the Wars, scoring 1,000 runs a season 16 times. Of diminutive stature, he was quick to drive and pull but was suspect against the fastest bowling and suffered occasional fallow spells in the county game. He compiled 72 centuries in all, including one against every other county and university side.

Bowling a mix of leg and off spin, O'Connor took 557 wickets, including 93 in 1926. He played one Test against South Africa in 1929 and, that winter, three more as part of a below strength touring team in the West Indies. After retiring from the first-class arena, he coached at Eton. and at Chigwell School in the 1960s.
