= William Prince (cricketer) =

English cricketer

Personal information
- Full name: William Prince
- Born: 28 March 1868; Somercotes, Derbyshire, England
- Died: 1 June 1948 (aged 80); New Ollerton, England
- Batting: Right-handed
- Bowling: RIght-arm medium-fast

Domestic team information
- Years: Team
- 1898: Derbyshire
- Only FC: 11 July 1898 Derbyshire v Nottinghamshire

Career statistics
Competition	First-class
Matches	1
Runs scored	2
Batting average	–
100s/50s	0/0
Top score	2*
Balls bowled	125
Wickets	0
Bowling average	–
5 wickets in innings	–
10 wickets in match	–
Best bowling	–
Catches/stumpings	0/–
- Source: CricketArchive, April 2012

William Prince (28 March 1868 – 1 June 1948) was an English cricketer who played first-class cricket for Derbyshire in 1898.

Prince was born in Somercotes, Derbyshire, the son of Thomas Prince, a coal miner, and his wife Hannah. In 1881 the family was living at Skegby, Nottingham and Prince himself was a miner at the age of 13.

Prince, with fellow one-timer John Bourne, played one match for Derbyshire in the 1898 season in July against Nottinghamshire. A right-arm medium-fast bowler, Prince was given little chance to bowl and took no wickets, but conceded just thirteen from nine overs, the best runs-per-over rate for the team during the entire match. He was a right-handed batsman and as a tailender, put on two runs in the first innings and did not bat in the second innings as the match finished as a draw.

Prince died in New Ollerton at the age of 80.
