= Charles Ward (cricketer, born 1875) =

English cricketer

Personal information
- Full name: Charles Gordon Ward
- Born: 23 September 1875; Braughing, Hertfordshire, England
- Died: 27 June 1954 (aged 78); South Ormsby, Lincolnshire, England
- Batting: Right-handed
- Bowling: Unknown
- Relatives: Herbert Ward (brother); Leonard Ward (cousin)

Domestic team information
- Years: Team
- 1897–1901: Hampshire
- 1907–1911: Lincolnshire
- 1912–1922: Hertfordshire

Career statistics
Competition	First-class
Matches	14
Runs scored	186
Batting average	8.08
100s/50s	–/–
Top score	30
Balls bowled	178
Wickets	2
Bowling average	67.50
5 wickets in innings	–
10 wickets in match	–
Best bowling	1/17
Catches/stumpings	3/–
- Source: Cricinfo, 18 February 2010

Charles Gordon Ward (23 September 1875 — 27 June 1954) was an English first-class cricketer and clergyman.

The son of The Reverend Philip Gordon Ward Vicar, he was born in September 1875 at Braughing, Hertfordshire. Ward played first-class cricket for Hampshire, with his debut coming against Warwickshire in 1897 County Championship. He played first-class cricket for Hampshire until 1901, making fourteen appearances. In these, he scored 186 runs at an average of 8.08, with a highest score of 30. With the ball, he took two wickets. Shortly after playing for Hampshire, Ward undertook ecclesiastical training in Lincoln at the Chancellors School and was ordained in 1903.

Ward undertook his ecclesiastical duties in Heapham, Lincolnshire. He played minor counties cricket for Lincolnshire from 1907 to 1910, making 29 appearances in the Minor Counties Championship, making a century against Hertfordshire in 1909. Ward later returned to Hertfordshire, where he became vicar at North Mymms. There, he played minor counties cricket for Hertfordshire either side of the First World War, making 34 appearances in the Minor Counties Championship between 1910 and 1922. He later returned to Lincolnshire, where he was vicar at South Ormsby from 1930 until his death in June 1954. His brother was the sportsman Herbert Ward, who played both first-class cricket and football for Southampton. His cousin, Leonard Ward, was also a first-class cricketer.
