= Arthur Barton (cricketer) =

English cricketer

Personal information
- Born: 30 September 1874; Ilkeston, Derbyshire, England
- Died: 19 January 1949 (aged 74); Ealing, England
- Batting: Right-handed

Domestic team information
- Years: Team
- 1901: Derbyshire
- FC debut: 15 July 1901 Derbyshire v Nottinghamshire
- Last FC: 22 July 1901 Derbyshire v Gloucestershire

Career statistics
Competition	First-class
Matches	3
Runs scored	24
Batting average	4.00
100s/50s	0/0
Top score	7
Balls bowled	84
Wickets	0
Bowling average	–
5 wickets in innings	–
10 wickets in match	–
Best bowling	–
Catches/stumpings	0/–
- Source: CricketArchive, December 2011

Arthur Barton (30 September 1874 – 19 January 1949) was an English cricketer who played first-class cricket for Derbyshire in 1901.

Barton was born in Ilkeston, Derbyshire, the son of William Barton, coalminer and grocer and his wife Ann. He played three games for Derbyshire during the 1901 season – playing in his first game against Nottinghamshire during July 1901, and playing in his last game just a week later. Barton struggled during his debut match, and was dropped down the order for his next, where he stayed for his final game.

Barton was a right-handed batsman and played six innings in his three first-class games to make a total of 24 runs. He bowled 84 balls, but did not take a wicket.

Barton died in Ealing aged 75.
