= Solomon Hardy =

English cricketer (1863–1931)

Personal information
- Born: 18 May 1863; Ilkeston, Derbyshire, England
- Died: 5 July 1931 (aged 68); Ilkeston, Derbyshire
- Batting: Right-handed
- Role: Wicket-keeper

Domestic team information
- Years: Team
- 1898: Derbyshire
- Only FC: 4 July 1898 Derbyshire v Essex

Career statistics
Competition	First-class
Matches	1
Runs scored	10
Batting average	5.00
100s/50s	0/0
Top score	9
Catches/stumpings	2/0
- Source: CricketArchive, April 2012

Solomon Hardy (18 May 1863 – 5 July 1931) was an English cricketer who played first-class cricket for Derbyshire in 1898.

Hardy was born in Ilkeston, Derbyshire and was a coal miner when living with his widowed mother in Ilkeston in 1881.

Hardy represented Derbyshire in one game during the 1898 season when he kept wicket against Essex. Derbyshire lost the match by a very large margin as the Essex batsmen notched up two centuries and two scores in the 90s before Hardy ended two of their innings with catches behind the stumps. Hardy, a right-handed batsman, put on ten runs for the team.

Hardy died in Ilkeston aged 68.
