= Joseph Burton (cricketer) =

English cricketer

Personal information
- Full name: Joseph Parkin Burton
- Born: 10 December 1873; Somercotes, Derbyshire, England
- Died: 25 January 1940 (aged 66); Somercotes, Derbyshire, England
- Batting: Right-handed

Domestic team information
- Years: Team
- 1901: Derbyshire
- FC debut: 15 July 1901 Derbyshire v Nottinghamshire
- Last FC: 15 August 1901 Derbyshire v Warwickshire

Career statistics
Competition	First-class
Matches	7
Runs scored	200
Batting average	18.18
100s/50s	0/1
Top score	51*
Catches/stumpings	4/–
- Source: CricketArchive, April 2012

Joseph Parkin Burton (10 December 1873 – 25 January 1940) was an English cricketer who played first-class cricket for Derbyshire during the 1901 season.

Burton was born at Somercotes, Derbyshire, the son of Thomas Burton, a plumber and painter, and his wife Elizabeth. He made his debut for Derbyshire in the 1901 season in a draw against Nottinghamshire in July in which he made his career-best score of 51 not out from sixth in the batting order. In the same match, English Test cricketer Billy Gunn hit a career best innings of 273, and in response Levi Wright hit an innings of 193 for Derbyshire. Burton made two solid innings of 34 and 33 a week later against Gloucestershire and opened with 41 against Hampshire. However, in the other four matches he only achieved low scores and did not play another season.

Burton was a right-handed batsman and played twelve innings in seven first-class matches with an average of 18.18 and a top score of 51 not out.

Burton died at Somercotes aged 67.
