= Winchelsea Cutting =

Scientific site in East Sussex

Coordinates: 50.920°N 0.705°E

- Site of Special Scientific Interest
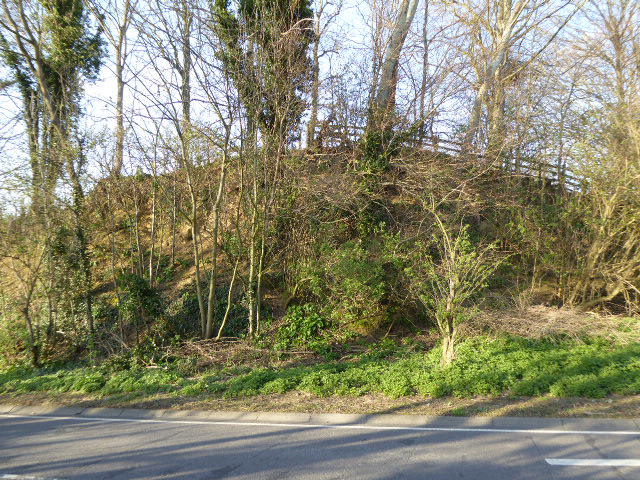
- Location of Winchelsea Cutting.
- Area of search: East Sussex
- Grid reference: TQ 902 169
- Interest: Geological
- Area: 0.15 hectares (0.37 acres)
- Notification date: 1990
- Location map: Magic Map

Winchelsea Cutting is a 0.15-hectare (0.37-acre) geological Site of Special Scientific Interest on the southern outskirts of Winchelsea in East Sussex. It is a Geological Conservation Review site.

This site exposes the top two metres of the Ashdown Sand Formation and the bottom four metres of the Wadhurst Clay Formation, dating to the Wealden Group of the Lower Cretaceous around 140 million years ago.

The site is at the side of the A259 road.
