= James Cross (cricketer) =

English cricketer

Personal information
- Born: 6 February 1862; Leyland, Lancashire, England
- Died: 22 March 1927 (aged 65); Great Harwood, England
- Batting: Right-handed

Domestic team information
- Years: Team
- 1897: Derbyshire
- FC debut: 3 June 1897 Derbyshire v Lancashire
- Last FC: 30 August 1897 Derbyshire v Warwickshire

Career statistics
Competition	First-class
Matches	9
Runs scored	82
Batting average	7.45
100s/50s	0/0
Top score	29*
Balls bowled	1,831
Wickets	22
Bowling average	28.81
5 wickets in innings	0
10 wickets in match	0
Best bowling	4/68
Catches/stumpings	4/–
- Source: CricketArchive, October 2011

James Cross (6 February 1862 – 22 March 1927) was an English first-class cricketer who played for Derbyshire in 1897.

Cross was born at Leyland, Lancashire, the son of William Cross a general labourer and his wife Alice. Cross was a brick and tile maker and in 1881 was living with his parents at 35 Bradshaw Street. He joined Derbyshire in the 1897 season when the club's bowling was weakened by the absence of John Hulme. He made his first-class debut against Lancashire in June when he took 4 wickets and was not out for 11 in the first innings. Against Nottinghamshire he was not out for 29 and he took 4 for 68 against Leicestershire. He closed his first-class career at the end of the season after 9 matches.

Cross took 22 first-class wickets at an average of 28.81 and a best performance of 4 for 68. He played 15 innings in 9 first-class matches with an average of 7.45 and a top score of 29 not out.

Cross died at Great Harwood, Lancashire at the age of 65.
