= Leonard Ward (English cricketer) =

English cricketer and clergyman (1866–1945)

Personal information
- Full name: Leonard Foster Ward
- Born: 24 March 1866; Middleton, Lancashire
- Died: 1 September 1945 (aged 79); St. Helier, Jersey

Domestic team information
- Years: Team
- 1899: Derbyshire

Career statistics
Competition	First-class
Matches	1
Runs scored	0
Batting average	0.00
100s/50s	0/0
Top score	0
Catches/stumpings	0/–
- Source: CricketArchive, April 2012

Leonard Foster Ward (24 March 1866 – 1 September 1945) was an English clergyman and cricketer who played first-class cricket for Derbyshire in 1899.

== Life ==
Ward was born in Middleton, Lancashire, the second son of Rev Charles Bruce Ward and his wife Hannah Maria Blagg. His father had played first-class cricket for Oxford University. Ward was educated at Denstone College and Selwyn College, Cambridge. He made his cricketing debut in 1887 for the Gentlemen of Derbyshire vs. the Gentlemen of Canada. He was ordained deacon at St Albans in 1893, and priest in 1894. From 1893 to 1895 he was curate of Wrexham, Denbighshire. He then became curate of Whitfield, Derbyshire.

Ward appeared in one first-class match for Derbyshire during the 1899 season, against Lancashire. He was bowled out for a duck in both of his innings, first by onetime Test cricketer Arthur Mold, and secondly by Test cricketer Albert Ward.

Ward left Whitfield in 1904 and became curate in charge at All Saints Church St. Helier, Jersey. He was the vicar there from 1916 to 1945.

Ward died at St Helier at the age of 79.

== Family ==
Ward married Ruby Smith of Glossop, and had a family. His brother Cyril Ward (1863–1935) was a noted watercolour painter. His cousins Charles and Herbert were also first-class cricketers.
