= Charles Kenward =

English cricketer (1877–1948)

Personal information
- Full name: Charles Kenward
- Born: 7 September 1877; Icklesham, Sussex, England
- Died: 14 November 1948 (aged 71); Rye, Sussex, England
- Batting: Unknown
- Relatives: Richard Kenward (brother)

Career statistics
Competition	First-class
Matches	1
Runs scored	47
Batting average	23.50
100s/50s	–/–
Top score	43
Catches/stumpings	2/–
- Source: Cricinfo, 18 February 2019

Charles Kenward (7 September 1877 – 14 November 1948) was an English first-class cricketer.

Kenward was born at Icklesham Manor House in the village of Icklesham, Sussex to Trayton Kenward and his wife Emily Turtle. His father was a farmer of over 1,000 acres (4.0 km^{2}). Kenward made a single appearance in first-class cricket for the Gentlemen of England against Oxford University at Oxford in 1905. Batting twice during the match, Kenward was dismissed for 43 runs by Robin Udal in the Gentlemen of England first-innings, while in their second-innings he was dismissed by Francis Henley for 4 runs.

He was later a Land Tax Commissioner for the county of Sussex in 1938. He died at Rye, Sussex in November 1948. His brother, Richard Kenward, was also a first-class cricketer.
