= Robert Else =

English cricketer (1876–1955)

Personal information
- Born: 17 November 1876; Holloway, Derbyshire, England
- Died: 16 September 1955 (aged 78); Sheffield, England
- Batting: Left-handed

Domestic team information
- Years: Team
- 1901–1903: Derbyshire
- FC debut: 30 May 1901 Derbyshire v Surrey
- Last FC: 17 August 1903 Derbyshire v Warwickshire

Career statistics
Competition	First-class
Matches	5
Runs scored	59
Batting average	7.37
100s/50s	0/0
Top score	28
Balls bowled	90
Wickets	1
Bowling average	61.00
5 wickets in innings	0
10 wickets in match	0
Best bowling	1/56
Catches/stumpings	3/–
- Source: CricketArchive, November 2011

Robert Else (17 November 1876 – 16 September 1955) was an English first-class cricketer who played for Derbyshire in 1901 and 1903.

Else was born at Lea, Holloway, Derbyshire, the son of John Else and his wife Henrietta Lowe. His father was a bobbin maker and in 1881 they were all living with his grandparents at the Old Hat Factory in Wirksworth. Else made his debut for Derbyshire in May 1901 against Surrey, when his scores were 1 and 2. He played again that season against the South Africans when he opened the batting scoring a duck in the first innings and surviving the whole of the second innings for 6 not out. He did not play again until July 1903 when against London County he took a wicket and made his top score of 28. He played his last two matches in 1903 and made little impression in them.

Else was a left-hand batsman and played ten innings in five first-class matches with an average of 7.3 and a top score of 28. He bowled fifteen overs and took 1 first-class wicket for 61 runs in total.

Else died at Broomhill, Sheffield, Yorkshire at the age of 78.
