= Arthur Morton (cricketer, born 1882) =

English cricketer

Personal information
- Born: 27 March 1882; Salford, Lancashire, England
- Died: 21 February 1970 (aged 87); Sheffield, England
- Batting: Right-handed
- Bowling: Right-arm medium-fast

Domestic team information
- Years: Team
- 1901: Derbyshire
- Only FC: 15 August 1901 Derbyshire v Warwickshire

Career statistics
Competition	First-class
Matches	1
Runs scored	0
Batting average	0.00
100s/50s	0/0
Top score	0
Balls bowled	18
Wickets	0
Bowling average	–
5 wickets in innings	–
10 wickets in match	–
Best bowling	–
Catches/stumpings	0/–
- Source: CricketArchive, April 2012

Arthur Morton (27 March 1882 – 21 February 1970) was an English cricketer who played first-class cricket for Derbyshire in 1901.

Morton was born in Salford, Lancashire. He made one appearance for Derbyshire in the 1901 season, at the age of nineteen appearing against Warwickshire. He scored ducks in both innings and bowled three overs without taking a wicket in a game that Warwickshire won by an innings. He was a right-handed batsman and a right-arm medium-fast bowler.

Morton died in Sheffield at the age of 87.
