= Richard Kenward =

English cricketer (1875–1957)

Personal information
- Born: 23 May 1875; Icklesham, Sussex, England
- Died: 24 December 1957 (aged 82); Croydon, Surrey, England
- Batting: Right-handed
- Relatives: Charles Kenward (brother)

Domestic team information
- Years: Team
- 1899: Derbyshire
- 1902: Sussex
- FC debut: 22 June 1899 Derbyshire v Essex
- Last FC: 19 June 1905 Gentlemen of England v Cambridge University

Career statistics
Competition	First-class
Matches	17
Runs scored	387
Batting average	14.33
100s/50s	0/1
Top score	56
Catches/stumpings	4/–
- Source: CricketArchive, April 2012

Richard Kenward (23 May 1875 – 24 December 1957) was an English cricketer who played first-class cricket for Derbyshire in 1899 and for Sussex in 1902.

Kenward was born at Icklesham, Sussex, the son of Trayton Kenward and his wife Emily Turtle. His father was a farmer of over 1,000 acres (4.0 km^{2}) living at The Manor House Icklesham.

Kenward made his debut for Derbyshire in the 1899 season in a match against Essex in June when he made 56 in his second innings to help Derbyshire to victory. Kenward generally made a reasonable score when he played more than one innings and his average for the team was 17.52. However he stopped playing for Derbyshire at the end of the season.

In 1902 Kenward played four games for Sussex but made little impression as 21 of his 23 runs came in one innings. He also played a match for a London County team captained by W. G. Grace against Derbyshire when Billy Bestwick took him for one. In 1905 he played for the Gentlemen of England and for London County.

Kenward was a right-hand batsman and played 27 innings in 17 first-class matches with an average of 14.33 and a top score of 56.

Kenward died at Croydon, Surrey at the age of 82. His brother Charles Kenward played cricket for Surrey second XI and one first-class match for the Gentlemen of England.
