= Derbyshire County Cricket Club in 1897 =

1897 season of an English cricket team

Derbyshire County Cricket Club seasons
1897 season
- Captain: Sydney Evershed
- County Championship: 14
- Most runs: Levi Wright
- Most wickets: George Davidson
- Most catches: William Storer

Derbyshire County Cricket Club in 1897 was the cricket season when the English club Derbyshire had been playing for twenty-six years. It was their third season in the County Championship and they came fourteenth after failing to win a match, though they were exceptionally unlucky in losing by a single wicket to power clubs Lancashire and Yorkshire and being robbed by time of victory over Leicestershire late in the season.

== 1897 season ==
Derbyshire played sixteen games in the County Championship and one against MCC. They did not win a match in the season, losing ten. They were missing two key bowlers: John Hulme, who had taken most wickets in 1896, did not play at all during the season; and George Porter, who underwent surgery in 1896 and retired from the game.

Sydney Evershed was in his seventh season as captain. Levi Wright was top scorer, overtaking Bagshaw's lead in the Championship with a good performance against MCC. George Davidson took most wickets but, apart from three matches on sticky wickets against Lancashire, Warwickshire and Yorkshire, was never difficult, and of the others only wicket-keeper Storer ever took five wickets in one innings.

Of those who made their debuts in the season, Arnold Warren went on to play for the club for 23 years and represented England in 1905, and Maynard Ashcroft, a doctor, went on to become club captain. Most of the remaining newcomers were from mining families. Frank Davidson, Joseph Hancock and William Wilmot each played over several more seasons but more or less occasionally. James Cross, Herbert Bostock, Dick Steeples and Edward Houseman all appeared only in the 1897 season, Cross playing nine matches, Bostock four, Steeples three and Houseman one. Cross and Steeples filled in for the lack of bowling, while Bostock achieved a high average in his three games.

=== Matches ===
List of matches
No.	Date	V	Result	Margin	Notes
1	10 May 1897	Lancashire; County Ground, Derby	Lost	Innings and 220 runs	Ward 162; Mold 6-55 and 6-29
2	24 May 1897	Surrey; Kennington Oval	Lost	Innings and 3 runs	H Bagshaw 114; W Storer 5-40; Richardson 5-82
3	31 May 1897	Warwickshire; County Ground, Derby	Drawn		G Davidson 6-62
4	03 Jun 1897	Lancashire; Aigburth, Liverpool	Lost	1 wicket	Briggs 8-70; G Davidson 6-22
5	07 Jun 1897	Hampshire; County Ground, Southampton	Drawn		Lacey 121; H Bagshaw 105
6	10 Jun 1897	MCC; Lord's Cricket Ground, St John's Wood	Lost	2 wickets	Trott 6-47; Mead 5-67
7	14 Jun 1897	Yorkshire; County Ground, Derby	Lost	1 wicket	W Storer 104; Peel 5-47
8	28 Jun 1897	Essex; County Ground, Leyton	Lost	7 wickets	W Chatterton 120; Bull 7-93 and 6-63
9	05 Jul 1897	Nottinghamshire; County Ground, Derby	Drawn		Gunn 152;
10	19 Jul 1897	Essex; County Ground, Derby	Drawn		SH Evershed 112; Bull 6-137
11	22 Jul 1897	Leicestershire; Grace Road, Leicester	Lost	5 wickets	Stocks 5-49; Woodcock 5-106
12	26 Jul 1897	Surrey; County Ground, Derby	Lost	10 wickets	Key 130; Richardson 6-52; Lees 5-63
13	02 Aug 1897	Hampshire; County Ground, Derby	Lost	186 runs	
14	09 Aug 1897	Nottinghamshire; Trent Bridge, Nottingham	Drawn		Gunn 230; LG Wright 133; G Davidson 121
15	16 Aug 1897	Leicestershire; County Ground, Derby	Drawn		H Bagshaw 124
16	19 Aug 1897	Yorkshire; Park Avenue Cricket Ground, Bradford	Lost	5 wickets	Haigh 6-18 and 5-62; G Davidson 6-23; Wainwright 5-39
17	30 Aug 1897	Warwickshire; Edgbaston, Birmingham	Drawn		

== Statistics ==
=== County Championship batting averages ===
Name	Matches	Inns	Runs	High score	Average	100s
G Davidson	16	27	745	121	31.04	1
H Bagshaw	15	28	825	124	30.55	3
W Chatterton	14	24	661	120	27.54	1
LG Wright	16	28	765	133	27.32	1
H Bostock	3	4	54	36	27.00	0
W Storer	16	28	688	104*	26.46	1
SH Evershed	14	25	647	112	25.88	1
EM Ashcroft	7	12	222	99	22.20	0
WB Delacombe	3	3	43	23*	21.50	0
W Sugg	15	25	451	84	18.04	0
GG Walker	4	6	52	27*	10.40	0
J Cross	8	13	81	29*	9.00	0
HG Curgenven	4	7	57	26	8.14	0
T Gould	5	9	47	16*	6.71	0
JH Purdy	1	2	6	6*	6.00	0
W Wilmot	3	4	21	20	5.25	0
JW Hancock	16	26	89	16	5.23	0
A Warren	9	13	58	19*	4.83	0
R Steeples	3	5	20	16	4.00	0
EO Houseman	1	2	4	4	2.00	0
GA Marsden	1	2	1	1	0.50	0
JP Hall	1	2	0	0	0.00	0
F Davidson	1	0				0

Leading first-class batsmen for Derbyshire by runs scored
Name	Mat	Inns	Runs	HS	Ave	100
LG Wright	17	30	888	133	29.60 (a)	1
H Bagshaw	16	30	861	124	28.70 (a)	3
G Davidson	17	29	802	121	27.66 (a)	1
W Storer	17	30	720	104*	26.00 (a)	1
W Chatterton	15	26	682	120	26.23 (a)	1

(a) Figures adjusted for non Championship match

=== County Championship bowling averages ===
Name	Balls	Runs	Wickets	BB	Average
G Davidson	3896	1254	56	6-22	22.39
JW Hancock	2268	1126	46	4-35	24.47
W Storer	1035	614	22	5-40	27.90
W Chatterton	1292	476	21	3-38	22.66
J Cross	1691	574	18	4-68	31.88
T Gould	410	205	9	4-45	22.77
R Steeples	530	214	9	4-73	23.77
GG Walker	632	321	9	4-44	35.66
H Bagshaw	463	195	6	2-43	32.50
A Warren	586	316	5	1-1	63.20
HG Curgenven	90	61	2	2-25	30.50
JH Purdy	50	20	0		
W Sugg	50	33	0		
SH Evershed	30	5	0		
EM Ashcroft	90	43	0		
JP Hall	45	33	0		
WB Delacombe	48	27	0		
F Davidson	50	24	0		
LG Wright	10	5	0		

Leading first class bowlers for Derbyshire by wickets taken
Name	Balls	Runs	Wkts	BBI	Ave
G Davidson	4146	1352	58	6-22	23.31 (a)
JW Hancock	2456	1214	51	4-35	23.80 (a)
W Chatterton	1387	524	26	3-38	20.15 (a)
W Storer	1049	632	22	5-40	28.72 (a)
J Cross	1831	634	21	4-68	30.19 (a)

(a) Figures adjusted for non Championship match

=== Wicket Keeping ===
- William Storer Catches 26, Stumpings 2

== See also ==
- Derbyshire County Cricket Club seasons
- 1897 English cricket season
