= Daniel Bottom =

English cricketer

Personal information
- Full name: Daniel Bottom
- Born: 2 October 1864; Whitwell, Derbyshire, England
- Died: 16 February 1937 (aged 72); Sherwood, Nottingham, England
- Batting: Right-handed
- Bowling: Right-arm medium

Domestic team information
- Years: Team
- 1891–1901: Derbyshire
- 1899: Nottinghamshire
- FC debut: 9 August 1894 Derbyshire v Leicestershire
- Last FC: 12 August 1901 Derbyshire v Nottinghamshire

Career statistics
Competition	First-class
Matches	6
Runs scored	42
Batting average	4.20
100s/50s	0/0
Top score	9
Balls bowled	568
Wickets	9
Bowling average	27.77
5 wickets in innings	1
10 wickets in match	0
Best bowling	5/34
Catches/stumpings	2/–
- Source: CricketArchive, February 2012

Daniel Bottom (2 October 1864 – 16 February 1937) was an English cricketer who played for Derbyshire between 1891 and 1901 and for Nottinghamshire in 1899.

== Biography ==
Bottom was born in Whitwell, Derbyshire the son of John Bottom, a stonemason, and his wife Elizabeth. Bottom played his first game for Derbyshire in the 1891 season when the club was not accorded first-class status, and played four games in the 1893 season. In the 1894 season, he played his debut first-class match in a victorious game against Leicestershire but did not appear in the team again for four years until the 1898 season to make his debut in the County Championship in August.

Having established residency in Nottinghamshire, Bottom took part in three games during the 1899 season for Nottinghamshire. In the first of these against his old club he took 5 for 34 in the first innings. However he made little further impression in that or the two subsequent matches. His final match, in 1901, was back with Derbyshire in a defeat at the hands Nottinghamshire.

Bottom was a right-arm medium-pace bowler and took nine first-class wickets at an average of 27.77 and a best performance of 5-34. He was a right-handed batsman and played ten innings in six first-class matches with an average of 4.20 and a top score of 9.

Bottom died at the age of 72 in Sherwood, Nottingham.
