= William Delacombe =

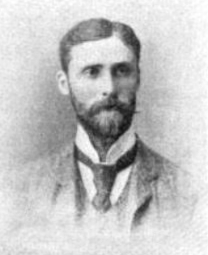
- In The Sketch, 13 May 1896

Personal information
- Full name: William Barclay Delacombe
- Born: 20 July 1860; Georgetown, Ascension Island
- Died: 14 October 1911 (aged 51); Nottingham, England
- Height: 6 ft 5 in (196 cm)

Domestic team information
- Years: Team
- 1892–1900: Derbyshire
- FC debut: 16 July 1894 Derbyshire v Surrey
- Last FC: 28 June 1900 Derbyshire v Essex

Career statistics
Competition	First-class
Matches	10
Runs scored	95
Batting average	9.50
100s/50s	0/0
Top score	23*
Balls bowled	68
Wickets	0
Bowling average	–
5 wickets in innings	–
10 wickets in match	–
Best bowling	–
Catches/stumpings	2/–
- Source: CricketArchive, January 2012

William Barclay Delacombe (20 July 1860 – 14 October 1911) was an English cricketer. He played for Derbyshire between 1892 and 1900.

== Biography ==
Delacombe was born in Georgetown, Ascension Island, the son of lieutenant-colonel William Addis Delacombe (d.1902) of the Royal Marines, who took command at San Juan Island in 1867 and had new quarters built for his family there. He attended King's School, Bruton and captained the School XI in 1878. He joined Derbyshire Friars in the same year.

Delacombe became secretary of Derbyshire County Cricket Club in 1889. He scored 86 in a match for the Incogniti in 1892 and made his playing debut for Derbyshire, then out of the league, also in the 1892 season. He made his initial first-class appearance in the 1894 season against Surrey and played sporadically between 1896 and 1900 with three games in the 1897 season, two games in the 1896 season and 1900 season and one game in other years.

Delacombe played 13 innings in 10 first-class matches with an average of 9.50 and a top score of 23 not out. He bowled twelve overs and did not take a wicket. He was described as "a good outfield and a sure catch, and useful with both bat and ball."

In 1897, playing for Incogniti, Delacombe took all ten wickets in an innings including a hat-trick. He continued as secretary of Derbyshire until his retirement in 1908. He died in Nottingham three years later aged 51.
