= Derbyshire County Cricket Club in 1892 =

1892 season of an English cricket team

Derbyshire County Cricket Club seasons
1892 season
- Captain: Sydney Evershed
- Most runs: Harry Bagshaw
- Most wickets: George Davidson

Derbyshire County Cricket Club in 1892 was the cricket season when the English club Derbyshire had been playing for twenty one years. Derbyshire's matches were not considered to be first class in this season. The club had lost first class status after 1887 and did not regain it until 1894, the year before they joined the County Championship. However many of the players competed for the club earlier or subsequently at first-class level.

== 1892 season ==
Derbyshire played thirteen games, and all except for Cheshire were against sides that they had played in first class matches before 1888 or that joined the County Championship four years later. Sydney Evershed was in his second year as captain. Harry Bagshaw was top scorer. George Davidson scored a century and topped the bowling with 91 wickets. Derbyshire played an interesting turn-around match against Leicestershire. Derbyshire had to follow on at 100 behind and made 423 in the second innings with centuries by Evershed and Davidson. Leicestershire were all out for 98 with Hulme taking five wickets for three runs.

Chatterton played one Test match for England against South Africa earlier in the year. He also played several first class matches during the season, mainly for MCC or Players v Gentlemen. Davidson also played first class matches for MCC.

=== Matches ===
List of matches
No.	Date	V	Result	Margin	Notes
1	12 May 1892	MCC; Lord's Cricket Ground, St John's Wood	Lost	9 wickets	Mead 5-55
2	30 May 1892	Yorkshire; Headingley, Leeds	Lost	Innings and 43 runs	Hirst 5-12; Peel 5-7
3	06 Jun 1892	Essex; County Ground, Leyton	Lost	5 wickets	Kortright 8-58; G Davidson 6-65
4	16 Jun 1892	Surrey; County Ground, Derby	Lost	7 wickets	Richardson 7-67 and 5-63; G Davidson 5-33
5	20 Jun 1892	Leicestershire; Grace Road, Leicester	Lost	1 wicket	Warren 138; Pougher 5-56; Woodcock 5-56; G Porter 6-20
6	27 Jun 1892	Cheshire; County Ground, Derby	Won	Innings and 115 runs	G Porter 5-22; G Davidson 6-30
7	04 Jul 1892	Leicestershire; County Ground, Derby	Won	210 runs	SH Evershed 119; G Davidson 106 and 5-74; Pougher 5-53; J J Hulme 5-3
8	14 Jul 1892	Hampshire; County Ground, Derby	Won	89 runs	Barton 5-34; Baldwin 5-34; G Davidson 5-13; G Porter 5-14
9	18 Jul 1892	Cheshire; Cale Green, Stockport	Won	5 wickets	G Davidson 7-39 and 5-32; Bennet 5-65; W Hall 5-41
10	01 Aug 1892	Essex; County Ground, Derby	Drawn		G Davidson 5-65; Kortright 8-49
11	08 Aug 1892	Surrey; Kennington Oval	Lost	93 runs	G Porter 6-62; Richardson 6-44; G Davidson 6-62; Lockwood 8-27
12	11 Aug 1892	Hampshire; County Ground, Southampton	Won	3 wickets	G Porter 5-88; Baldwin 5-62
13	15 Aug 1892	Yorkshire; County Ground, Derby	Lost	187 runs	W Hall 5-65; Smith 6-94

== Statistics ==
=== Batting averages ===
Name	Matches	Inns	Runs	High score	Average	100s
H Bagshaw	12	23	552	68	24.00	0
W Storer	13	24	442	53	18.42	0
W Chatterton	12	23	405	56	17.61	0
J J Hulme	8	14	238	51	17.00	0
G Davidson	13	25	424	106	16.96	1
SH Evershed	11	21	337	119	16.05	1
LG Wright	12	23	356	70	15.48	0
W Hall	6	9	123	32	13.67	0
S Malthouse	11	20	207	52	10.35	0
H F Wright	1	2	17	17	8.50	0
W S Eadie	5	9	75	26	8.33	0
WB Delacombe	1	2	15	15	7.50	0
W Sugg	13	25	169	43	6.76	0
R G Tomlinson	2	4	27	14	6.75	0
J Stubbings	1	2	12	8	6.00	0
F Evershed	3	5	23	11	4.60	0
E Evershed	1	2	9	8	4.50	0
S Thorpe	1	2	8	8	4.00	0
J Cupitt	1	2	8	4	4.00	0
HC Mosby	3	3	11	5	3.67	0
G Porter	12	19	56	19	2.95	0
F Eyre	1	2	5	5	2.50	0
M Cropper	1	2	4	4	2.00	0

=== Bowling averages ===
Name	Balls	Runs	Wickets	BB	Average
G Davidson	3620	1162	91	7-39	12.77
G Porter	2576	892	51	6-20	17.49
W Sugg	628	337	18	4-57	18.72
J J Hulme	795	386	15	5-3	25.73
W Hall	540	223	15	5-41	14.87
W Chatterton	235	94	4	2-6	23.50
J Stubbings	55	35	4	4-24	8.75
S Malthouse	195	88	3	1-17	29.33
M Cropper	140	56	3	3-38	18.67
F Eyre	85	46	1	1-46	46.00
H Bagshaw	40	37	0		
HC Mosby	35	22	0		

== Wicket Keeper ==
- W Storer Catches 13, Stumping 6

== See also ==
- Derbyshire County Cricket Club seasons
- 1892 English cricket season
