= Derbyshire County Cricket Club in 1890 =

1890 season of an English cricket team

Derbyshire County Cricket Club seasons
1890 season
- Captain: Fred Spofforth
- Most runs: Levi Wright
- Most wickets: George Davidson

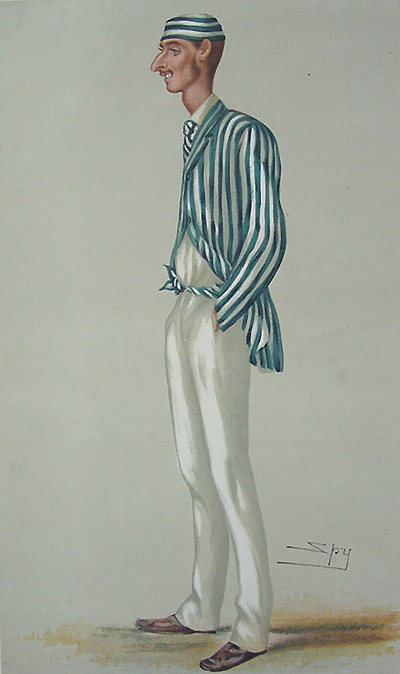
Fred Spofforth as caricatured by Spy in Vanity Fair, July 1878

Derbyshire County Cricket Club in 1890 was the cricket season when the English club Derbyshire had been playing twenty years. Derbyshire's matches were not considered to be first class in this season. Derbyshire had recruited Fred Spofforth a former Australian captain to help revive the club's fortunes. Spofforth was successful off the field in uncovering irregularities that contributed to the financial difficulties that had bedevilled the club for many years.

== 1890 season ==
Derbyshire played fourteen games, winning seven and losing five. They played the same county teams as in previous years and also minor county Norfolk for the first time. They also played against MCC and the touring Australians. Fred Spofforth, known as the "Demon Bowler" had toured England with the Australians in 1886, and afterwards chose to live in Derbyshire. With the residential qualification met in 1890, Spofforth was able not only to play for Derbyshire but to captain the side. Although the Demon Bowler took 9 for 56 against Leicestershire, it was George Davidson who took most wickets. Levi Wright was top scorer. Derbyshire did not have had a dedicated wicket-keeper during the season.

=== Matches ===
List of matches
No.	Date	V	Result	Margin	Notes
1	26 May 1890	Essex; County Ground, Leyton	Won	8 runs	Pickett 5-24 and 5-83; G Davidson 6-47 and 5-58
2	02 Jun 1890	Surrey; County Ground, Derby	Lost	28 runs	G Davidson 6-36; Sharpe 5-65; W Sugg 5-44
3	16 Jun 1890	Leicestershire; Grace Road, Leicester	Won	7 wickets	Joyce 5-85; GG Walker 7-53
4	30 Jun 1890	Australians; County Ground, Derby	Drawn		Turner 6–16; FR Spofforth 6-42
5	06 Jul 1890	Yorkshire; County Ground, Derby	Won	Innings and 25 runs	G Davidson 5-69
6	14 Jul 1890	MCC; Lord's Cricket Ground, St John's Wood	Lost	Innings and 181 runs	Davenport 158*; Shacklock 5-56
7	24 Jul 1890	Surrey; Kennington Oval	Lost	Innings and 58 runs	Key 137; LG Wright 122; S Malthouse 5–112; Sharpe 6-79
8	28 Jul 1890	Nottinghamshire; County Ground, Derby	Lost	Innings and 71 runs	Flowers 5-19
9	04 Aug 1890	Essex; County Ground, Derby	Lost	8 wickets	Mead 6-?; GG Walker 6-?; Pickett 6-?
10	08 Aug 1890	Norfolk; County Ground, Lakenham	Won	Innings and 60 runs	F Evershed 111; Hoare 5–106; GG Walker 6-27
11	11 Aug 1890	Leicestershire; County Ground, Derby	Won	145 runs	FR Spofforth 9-56 and 5-58
12	18 Aug 1890	Yorkshire; Bramall Lane, Sheffield	Won	52 runs	GG Walker 5-66
13	25 Aug 1890	Norfolk; County Ground, Derby	Won	Innings and 23 runs	GG Walker 5–19; Morton 6-57; FR Spofforth 7-26
14	01 Sep 1890	Nottinghamshire; Trent Bridge, Nottingham	Drawn		GG Walker 6-82

== Statistics ==
=== Batting averages ===
Name	Matches	Inns	Runs	High score	Average	100s
W Chatterton	13	22	538	86	24.45	0
LG Wright	12	24	544	122	22.67	1
S Malthouse	9	16	348	74	21.75	0
H Bagshaw	5	9	180	35	20.00	0
F Evershed	7	11	207	111	18.82	1
G Davidson	14	24	448	58	18.67	0
W L Shipton	2	4	69	36	17.25	0
SH Evershed	12	19	289	57	15.21	0
W Sugg	13	21	295	58	14.05	0
W Hall	9	15	196	64	13.07	0
W Storer	12	19	207	51	10.89	0
C Evans	3	4	36	30	9.00	0
F R Spofforth	6	9	75	9	8.33	0
E Evershed	5	7	56	19	8.00	0
HC Mosby	5	10	78	29	7.80	0
GG Walker	12	18	138	31	7.67	0
W S Eadie	3	5	35	19	7.00	0
G Porter	6	10	60	23	6.00	0
J Marshall	1	1	4	4	4.00	0
T Purdy	1	2	5	4	2.50	0
J Marlow	1	2	4	2	2.00	0
JJ Disney	1	2	3	2	1.50	0

=== Bowling averages ===
Name	Balls	Runs	Wickets	BB	Average
G Davidson	2952	1174	67	6-36	17.52
GG Walker	1611	650	55	7-53	11.82
FR Spofforth	1071	461	42	9-56	10.98
G Porter	920	359	21	4-78	17.10
W Sugg	447	226	13	5-44	17.38
S Malthouse	672	290	12	5-115	24.17
W Chatterton	485	235	8	4-34	29.38
HC Mosby	325	161	4	2-21	40.25
C Evans	125	62	1	1-22	62.00
W Hall	210	107	1	1-6	107.00
SH Evershed	10	7	0		
LG Wright	15	17	0		
H Bagshaw	90	32	0		
J Marlow	115	43	0		

=== Wicket Keeper ===
There does not appear to have been a regular wicket-keeper this season, and no wickets were taken by stumping.

== Financial scandal ==
By 1890 Derbyshire County Cricket Club was found to be in deep financial crisis. Fred Spofforth played a key part in identifying a fraud that had been committed. The cricket club's losses amounted to £1000 and Derby County Football Club was also raided. In 1880 Samuel Richardson, the club's first captain had become an administrator of the club, and in 1884 the remit was extended to the associated Derby County Football Club. Richardson admitted his guilt, fled the country in disgrace and settled in Madrid.

== See also ==
- Derbyshire County Cricket Club seasons
- 1890 English cricket season
