= Derbyshire County Cricket Club in 1889 =

1889 season of an English cricket team

Derbyshire County Cricket Club seasons
1889 season
- Captain: William Chatterton
- Most runs: William Chatterton
- Most wickets: George Davidson
- Most catches: James Disney

Derbyshire County Cricket Club in 1889 was the cricket season when the English club Derbyshire had been playing nineteen years. Derbyshire's matches were not considered to be first class in this season. The club had lost first class status after 1887 and did not regain it until 1894, the year before they joined the County Championship. However many of the players competed for the club earlier or subsequently at first-class level.

== 1889 season ==
Derbyshire played eleven games, all against sides that they had played in first class matches before 1888 or that joined the County Championship four years later. William Chatterton was in his third year as captain and was also top scorer making a century against Essex. George Davidson topped the bowling with 38 wickets.

Fred Spofforth, known as the "Demon Bowler" had toured England with the Australians in 1886, and afterwards chose to live in Derbyshire. The club tried to persuade the County Cricket Council to let him play for Derbyshire without waiting for the usual two years' residential qualification. Although the application was refused, in 1889 Yorkshire generously offered to waive the point so that Spofforth could play against them. He did so in two matches in the 1889 season, repaying them in one game by taking fifteen of their wickets for 81 runs. In the 1890 season, with the residential qualification met, Spofforth was able not only to play for Derbyshire but to captain the side. Charles Evans who made his debut played on for Derbyshire into the County Championship in 1895. Frank Evershed one of the Evershed brothers and a rugby international played in his first season for Derbyshire, but never played a first class game. Joseph Burrows, George Maltby and Thomas Purdy all played in one career match for Derbyshire against the MCC and only Purdy returned the following year.

=== Matches ===
List of matches
No.	Date	V	Result	Margin	Notes
1	20 May 1889	MCC; Lord's Cricket Ground, St John's Wood	Won	1 wicket	Hearne 6–16; West 6-29
2	10 Jun 1889	Yorkshire County Ground, Derby	Lost	54 runs	FR Spofforth 7-45 and 8-36; Peel 6-24 and 8-43
3	17 Jun 1889	Essex; County Ground, Leyton	Drawn		W Chatterton 168; G Davidson 129; Burrell 5-56
4	20 Jun 1889	Surrey; Kennington Oval	Lost	Innings and 223 runs	W Read 103; G Lohmann 5-42; T Bowley 6-48
5	24 Jun 1889	Leicestershire; County Ground, Derby	Won	Innings and 133 runs	W Sugg 104; A Rylott 5–125; G Davidson 6-49
6	01 Jul 1889	Nottinghamshire; Trent Bridge, Nottingham	Lost	10 wickets	Richardson 5-54; W Attewell 5-26
7	22 Jul 1889	Surrey; County Ground, Derby	Lost	48 runs	Beaumont 8-53; T Bowley 6-13
8	29 Jul 1889	Nottinghamshire; County Ground, Derby	Lost	Innings and 26 runs	W Attewell 6-35 and 5-24; Richardson 6-36
9	05 Aug 1889	Yorkshire; Bramall Lane, Sheffield	Drawn		
10	08 Aug 1889	Leicestershire; Grace Road, Leicester	Drawn		G Davidson 6-47; J J Hulme 5-28
11	19 Aug 1889	Essex; County Ground, Derby	Won	10 wickets	Bishop 5-77; W Sugg 7-44

== Statistics ==
=== Batting averages ===
Name	Matches	Inns	Runs	High score	Average	100s
C Evans	1	1	47	47	47.00	0
W Chatterton	11	18	500	168	27.78	1
G Davidson	11	18	389	129	21.61	1
W Sugg	10	17	318	104	18.71	1
SH Evershed	8	13	234	79	18.00	0
LG Wright	6	11	168	59	15.27	0
J J Hulme	10	16	192	61	12.00	0
W S Eadie	8	13	149	51	11.46	0
W Storer	2	3	32	14	10.67	0
HC Mosby	8	14	129	32	9.21	0
F Evershed	3	5	39	14	7.80	0
E Evershed	5	8	53	16	7.67	0
GG Walker	10	15	115	34	6.76	0
JR Burrows	1	2	9	7	4.50	0
GA Maltby	1	2	9	8	4.50	0
T Purdy	1	2	9	7	4.5	0
F R Spofforth	2	2	8	4	4.00	0
G Ratcliffe	1	2	0	0	0.00	0
G Porter	1	2	4	4	2.00	0
W Hall	11	17	157	34	9.24	0
JJ Disney	10	14	11	3	0.79	0

=== Bowling averages ===
Name	Balls	Runs	Wickets	BB	Average
G Davidson	1893	643	38	6-47	16.92
J J Hulme	1079	451	27	5-28	16.70
HC Mosby	432	159	11	3-28	14.45
W Hall	975	319	18	4-32	17.72
W Chatterton	782	280	18	4-80	15.56
GG Walker	960	412	16	4-28	25.75
FR Spofforth	265	81	15	8-36	5.40
W Sugg	174	67	10	7-44	6.70
G Porter	135	43	4	2-11	10.75
SH Evershed	30	15	0		

== Wicket Keeper ==
- James Disney Catches 11, Stumping 4

== See also ==
- Derbyshire County Cricket Club seasons
- 1889 English cricket season
