= Derbyshire County Cricket Club in 1893 =

1893 season of an English cricket team

Derbyshire County Cricket Club seasons
1893 season
- Captain: Sydney Evershed
- Most runs: Harry Bagshaw
- Most wickets: George Davidson
- Most catches: William Storer

Derbyshire County Cricket Club in 1893 was the cricket season when the English club Derbyshire had been playing for twenty-two years. Derbyshire's matches were not considered to be first class in this season. The club had lost first class status after 1887 and did not regain it until the following year 1894. However many of the players competed for the club earlier or subsequently at first-class level.

== 1893 season ==
Derbyshire played sixteen games and apart from two against Cheshire and one against MCC, these were all against future clubs in the County Championship or the touring Australians. They won seven matches and lost six, which was a sufficient prelude to their return to first-class status in the following 1894 season. Sydney Evershed was in his third season as captain. Harry Bagshaw was top scorer. George Davidson topped the bowling.

William Taylor noted that during Derbyshire's period in exile many fine players wore their colours including S H Evershed, who in captained the eleven with marked ability for many years and the grand veteran, Levi Wright—"a magnificent batsman and unsurpassed as a fieldsman in the oldfashioned position of square-point".

Frank Mycroft made his debut in the season, standing in as wicket-keeper for William Storer who also played for MCC and other teams. Mycroft went on to play three more seasons for Derbyshire. Joseph Ward and Joseph Soult only played in this season for Derbyshire and never achieved first-class status. Soult played just one match while Ward bowled in a useful manner in four matches.

=== Matches ===
List of matches
No.	Date	V	Result	Margin	Notes
1	18 May 1893	Surrey; County Ground, Derby	Lost	10 wickets	Richardson 8-36
2	22 May 1893	Essex; County Ground, Leyton	Lost	9 wickets	Kortright 7-39
3	05 Jun 1893	Cheshire; County Ground, Derby	Won	Innings and 80 runs	G Porter 5-49
4	12 Jun 1893	Lancashire; County Ground, Derby	Lost	6 wickets	Mold 7-58 and 6-84
5	15 Jun 1893	MCC; Lord's Cricket Ground, St John's Wood	Lost	26 runs	G Davidson 5-59; Geeson 6-39
6	26 Jun 1893	Cheshire; Birkenhead Park Cricket Club Ground	Won	4 wickets	G Davidson 5-38; Robson 6-82
7	03 Jul 1893	Australians; County Ground, Derby	Lost	Innings and 71 runs	Bannerman 105; Graham 219
8	10 Jul 1893	Lancashire; Old Trafford, Manchester	Drawn		Mold 7-83
9	17 Jul 1893	Yorkshire; County Ground, Derby	Drawn		W Chatterton 101*; J J Hulme 7-72 and 5-105
10	27 Jul 1893	Hampshire; County Ground, Derby	Won	8 wickets	Barton 107; LG Wright 97*; GG Walker 7-78; G Davidson 5-59
11	31 Jul 1893	Leicestershire; Grace Road, Leicester	Won	173 runs	Finney 5-84; J J Hulme 7-46
12	03 Aug 1893	Yorkshire; The Circle, Hull	Drawn		W Storer 108; Wardall 6-30; J J Hulme 5-45; Hirst 6-76
13	07 Aug 1893	Essex; County Ground, Derby	Won	9 wickets	J J Hulme 5-47 and 5-100
14	14 Aug 1893	Leicestershire; County Ground, Derby	Won	Innings and 50 runs	
15	24 Aug 1893	Hampshire; County Ground, Southampton	Won	159 runs	Soar 5-65 and 6-91; J J Hulme 5-48; GG Walker 5-45
16	28 Aug 1893	Surrey; Kennington Oval	Lost	7 wickets	Read 108; Richardson 5-100

== Statistics ==
=== Batting averages ===
Name	Matches	Inns	Runs	High score	Average	100s
H Bagshaw	14	28	761	96	27.18	0
LG Wright	14	28	753	97	26.89	0
W Chatterton	15	20	756	101	25.21	1
SH Evershed	12	24	588	84	24.50	0
W Storer	12	23	560	108	24.35	1
J J Hulme	6	12	249	48	20.75	0
G Davidson	14	27	512	72	18.96	0
S Malthouse	5	9	139	54	15.44	0
JP Ward	4	7	102	28	14.57	0
W Sugg	13	25	324	37	13.96	0
GG Walker	5	10	127	38	12.70	0
D Bottom	3	6	69	40	11.50	0
R G Tomlinson	2	3	30	20	10.00	0
J Cupitt	6	12	109	24	9.08	0
W L Shipton	2	3	25	14	8.33	0
W S Eadie	9	17	139	32	8.18	0
E Evershed	2	4	28	14	7.00	0
G Porter	10	20	125	22	6.25	0
J Soult	1	2	8	6	4.00	0
F Mycroft	2	4	11	8	2.75	0
W Walton	2	4	11	8	2.75	0
J Stubbings	1	2	3	2	1.50	0

=== Bowling averages ===
Name	Balls	Runs	Wickets	BB	Average
G Davidson	3769	1345	67	5-38	20.07
J J Hulme	2037	763	54	7-46	14.20
G Porter	2054	923	45	5-49	20.51
GG Walker	1001	499	33	7-78	15.12
J Cupitt	788	372	17	3-61	21.88
W Sugg	270	145	16	3-31	9.06
JP Ward	558	269	9	4-44	29.89
W Chatterton	534	212	6	3-29	35.33
W Storer	30	29	1	1-29	29:00
J Stubbings	50	40	1	1-40	40.00
H Bagshaw	80	57	0		
D Bottom	65	30	0		
S Malthouse	15	9	0		
J Soult	10	14	0		
SH Evershed	5	11	0		

== Wicket Keeper ==
- William Storer Catches 32, Stumping 5

== See also ==
- Derbyshire County Cricket Club seasons
- 1893 English cricket season
