= Derbyshire County Cricket Club in 1888 =

Cricket club in Derbyshire

Derbyshire County Cricket Club seasons
1888 season
- Captain: William Chatterton
- Most runs: William Chatterton.
- Most wickets: John Hulme
- Most catches: James Disney

Derbyshire County Cricket Club in 1888 was the cricket season when the English club Derbyshire had been playing for seventeen years and it was the first season they lost first class status.

== 1888 season ==
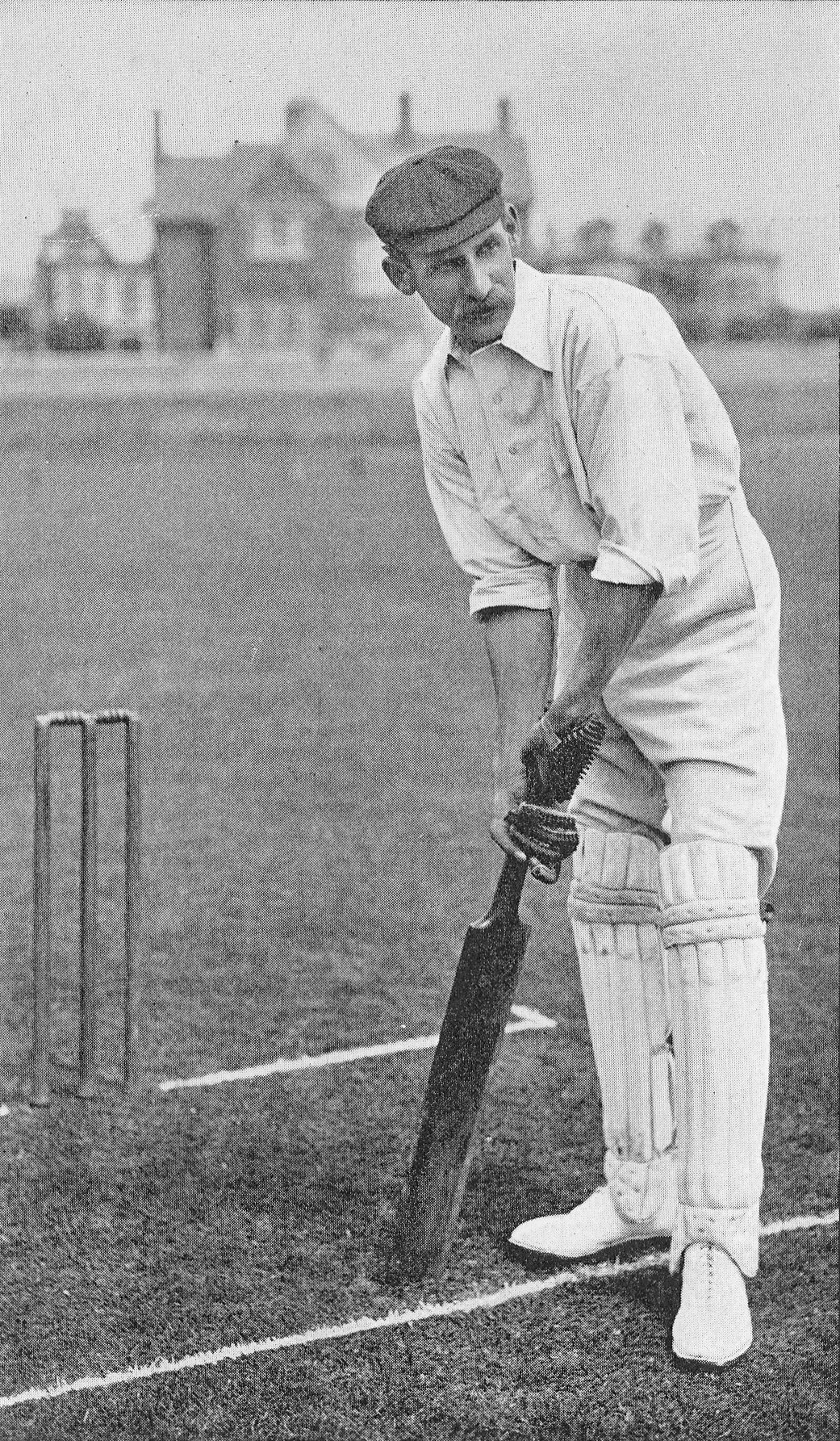
William Chatterton - captain

Although deprived of first class status Derbyshire played the same opponents as in the previous year with two matches each against Lancashire, Yorkshire, Surrey and Essex and one match each against Leicestershire and Middlesex . They also played one match against MCC and one against the touring Australians. Derbyshire won three of their matches and lost the remaining nine.

The captain for the year was William Chatterton who was also top scorer. John Hulme took most wickets. His total of 60 included 15 in one match against Yorkshire.

Of those who made their debut, Edward Evershed and Herbert Mosby played regularly over the following years before Derbyshire regained first class status. Evershed also played a first class game in 1898 as did Alfred Charlesworth who otherwise only played in the 1888 season. WA Hindley and JH Straw played their one-game each for Derbyshire in 1888 while William Hodges a schoolboy from Cheltenham College and William Pedley a former Sussex player each played two games in the season.

=== Matches ===
List of matches
No.	Date	V	Result	Margin	Notes
1	17 May 1888	MCC; Lord's Cricket Ground, St John's Wood	Won	45 runs	Wootton 6-30; GG Walker 5-31; J J Hulme 5-11
2	21 May 1888	Essex; County Ground, Leyton	Won	7 wickets	G Davidson 6-16
3	24 May 1888	Surrey; County Ground, Derby	Lost	Innings and 6 runs	Bowley 5-29; GG Walker 5-52; Beaumont 5-14
4	11 Jun 1888	Yorkshire; Park Avenue Cricket Ground, Bradford	Lost	7 wickets	Wade 5-32
5	09 Jul 1888	Australia; County Ground, Derby	Lost	Innings and 79 runs	Turner 6-20 and 7-26; W Cropper 6-43
6	23 Jul 1888	Lancashire; Old Trafford, Manchester	Lost	Innings and 78 runs	Briggs 7-35 and 6-4; J J Hulme 7-62
7	30 Jul 1888	Essex; County Ground, Derby	Lost	118 runs	Bishop 6-33
8	06 Aug 1888	Leicestershire; Grace Road, Leicester	Lost	27 runs	Pougher 6-15; J J Hulme 7-11
9	09 Aug 1888	Middlesex; County Ground, Derby	Lost	7 wickets	GG Walker 6-114
10	13 Aug 1888	Yorkshire; County Ground, Derby	Won	7 wickets	J J Hulme 8-30 and 7-40
11	20 Aug 1888	Lancashire; County Ground, Derby	Lost	4 wickets	Watson 6-17; J J Hulme 5-30
12	03 Sep 1888	Surrey; Kennington Oval	Lost	7 wickets	W Hall 5-31; Beaumont 6-30

== Statistics ==
=== Batting averages ===
Name	Matches	Inns	Runs	High score	Average	100s
W Chatterton	12	23	362	54	15.74	0
GG Walker	11	22	284	39	12.91	0
G Davidson	11	22	270	61	12.27	0
W Hall	4	8	96	43	12.00	0
LG Wright	8	16	169	35	10.56	0
SH Evershed	2	3	31	14	10.33	0
W Sugg	7	13	128	48	9.85	0
W Cropper	12	24	236	92	9.83	0
G Ratcliffe	10	20	153	50	7.65	0
GB Earl	2	4	28	21	7.00	0
W Pedley	2	4	27	16	6.75	0
W Storer	7	13	79	13	6.08	0
HC Mosby	2	4	24	16	6.00	0
G Porter	3	6	36	17	6.00	0
H Bagshaw	2	4	21	9	5.25	0
J J Hulme	11	22	96	20	4.36	0
A Charlesworth	3	6	24	15	4.00	0
WA Hindley	1	2	6	6	3.00	0
W Hodges	2	3	9	5	3.00	0
JJ Disney	11	21	58	11	2.76	0
E Evershed	2	4	10	6	2.50	0
FW Keeton	2	4	10	10	2.50	0
J Marshall	1	1	1	1	1.00	0
JH Straw	1	2	2	1	1.00	0

=== Bowling averages ===
Name	Balls	Runs	Wickets	BB	Average
J J Hulme	1669	622	60	8-30	10.37
GG Walker	1030	522	32	6-114	16.31
W Cropper	969	385	22	6-43	17.5
G Davidson	1069	356	19	6-16	18.74
W Chatterton	568	186	15	4-11	12.4
W Hall	371	148	14	5-31	10.57
G Porter	196	87	5	3-44	17.4
H Bagshaw	108	45	3	3-43	15.00
HC Mosby	35	19	2	1-5	9.5

=== Wicket keeping ===
- James Disney Catches 7 Stumping 4

== See also ==
- Derbyshire County Cricket Club seasons
- 1888 English cricket season
