= Derbyshire County Cricket Club in 1887 =

1887 season of an English cricket team

Derbyshire County Cricket Club seasons
1887 season
- Captain: William Chatterton
- Most runs: George Davidson
- Most wickets: George Davidson
- Most catches: James Disney

Derbyshire County Cricket Club in 1887 was the cricket season when the English club Derbyshire had been playing for sixteen years and was the last season before they lost first class status for seven years.

== 1887 season ==
Derbyshire played two county matches each against Lancashire, Yorkshire and Surrey, and one against MCC. They lost all these matches and as a result Wisden decided not to accord them first class status in the following year. However they also played three non first class matches against Essex and Leicestershire and won all three.

The captain for the year was William Chatterton who also played for MCC during the season. The top scorer was George Davidson who also took most wickets.

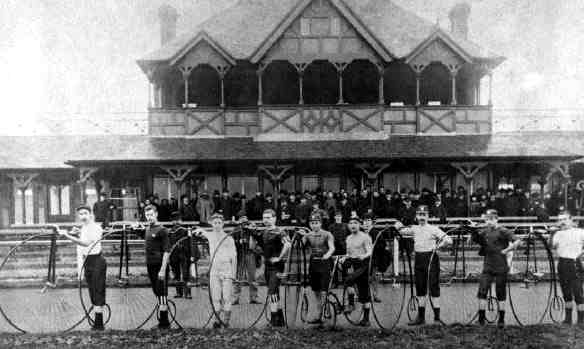
Long Eaton Recreation Ground (being used for a cycle race in 1885)

During the season Derbyshire played their first home fixture away from the County Ground, when they played Lancashire at the Recreation Ground, Long Eaton. This was the only occasion on which they used the venue.

Two important players made their debut in the season whose performance came to the fore once Derbyshire regained first-class status. They were John Hulme who took over 550 wickets for Derbyshire and Bill Storer who was one of the club's long-serving wicket-keepers. Harry Bagshaw who also made his debut gave the club many years service. Other players who made their debut were George Ratcliffe, Joseph Marshall, Henry Street and William Walton. None of these had the chance to play first class cricket for Derbyshire again although some appeared occasionally for the club in the intervening years.

A number of players appeared for Derbyshire for the last time this season. These included Edmund Maynard a former captain and George Barrington who had both joined in 1880. Also departing were Henry Slater who had been a member of the side since 1882 and Edwin Coup who had joined the club in 1885. In addition Thomas Mycroft a stand-in wicket-keeper who had made occasional appearances since 1877 played his last game. Several cricketers continued playing for Derbyshire but had stopped playing by the time the club reached first class status again in 1894. These were James Disney wicket-keeper since 1881, George Ratcliffe, Joseph Marshall, William Walton, three of the players who made their debut in 1887 and William Cropper who died in 1889 as a result of an unfortunate football accident.

=== Matches ===
List of first class matches
No.	Date	V	Result	Margin	Notes
1	12 May 1887	MCC; Lord's Cricket Ground, St John's Wood	Lost	145 runs	W Cropper 6-50; J Wooton 5-21
2	09 Jun 1887	Lancashire; Old Trafford, Manchester	Lost	6 wickets	W Cropper 6-54
3	27 Jun 1887	Yorkshire; County Ground, Derby	Lost	Innings and 39 runs	W Bates 103;
4	07 Jul 1887	Lancashire; Recreation Ground, Long Eaton	Lost	54 runs	GG Walker 5-64; J Briggs 7-49 and 5-51; G Davidson 6-43; A Watson 5-39
5	18 Jul 1887	Yorkshire; Bramall Lane, Sheffield	Lost	Innings and 163 runs	G Ullyet 199; W Bates 6-66
6	28 Jul 1887	Surrey; County Ground, Derby	Lost	Innings and 237 runs	W Read 145; G Davidson 5–148; J Beaumont 5-30
7	15 Aug 1887	Surrey; Kennington Oval	Lost	299 runs	G Davidson 5-67; GG Walker 5-49; G Lohmann 5-55; R Abel 6-15

List of other matches
No.	Date	V	Result	Margin	Notes
1	30 May 1887	Essex; County Ground, Derby	Won	7 wickets	
2	01 Aug 1887	Leicestershire; County Ground, Derby	Won	74 runs	
3	22 Aug 1887	Essex; County Ground, Leyton	Won	8 wickets	

== Statistics ==
=== First-class batting averages ===
Name	Am/ Pro	Age	Hand	Matches	Inns	Runs	High score	Average	100s
G Davidson	P	20	R	7	14	312	75	22.28	0
W Chatterton	P	24	R	12 (7)	22 (14)	334 (151)	66 (32)	15.90	0
W Cropper		24	R	7	14	211	43	15.07	0
G Ratcliffe		31	L	5	10	145	64	14.50	0
LG Wright	A	25	R	6	12	157	31	13.08	0
J Marshall		24	R	2	4	50	31	12.50	0
J J Hulme		24	L	6	12	135	31	12.27	0
JJ Disney	P	27	R	7	14	100	27*	10.00	0
W Sugg		27	R	7	14	129	48*	9.92	0
GG Walker	A	26	L	4	8	51	19*	8.50	0
H Street		24	R	2	4	24	15*	8.00	0
GB Barrington	A	30	R	2	4	28	25	7.00	0
W Storer	P	20	R	2	4	16	7	5.33	0
H Slater		32	R	2	4	10	6*	5.00	0
E Coup	A	26	L	5	10	39	12	4.33	0
EAJ Maynard	A	26	R	5	9	25	9	2.77	0
W Walton	A	24	R	1	2	4	3	2.00	0
H Bagshaw	P	27	L	1	2	0	0	0.00	0

Chatterton also played five matches for MCC during the season.

Leading first-class batsmen for Derbyshire by runs scored
Name	Mat	Inns	Runs	HS	Ave	100
G Davidson	7	14	312	75	22.28	0
W Cropper	7	14	211	43	15.07	0
LG Wright	6	12	157	31	13.08	0
W Chatterton	7	14	151	32	6.86 (a)	0
G Ratcliffe	5	10	145	64	14.50	0

(a) Figures recalculated to exclude non Derbyshire matches

=== First-class bowling averages ===
Name	Hand	Balls	Runs	Wickets	BB	Average
G Davidson	R MF	1559	789	36	6-43	21.08
W Cropper	L M	1248	503	27	6-50	18.62
W Chatterton	R S	1171	404 (182)	19 (5)	4-32	21.26
GG Walker	L F & Sl	673	319	15	5-49	21.26
J J Hulme	L MF	800	388	9	4-120	43.11
W Sugg	R M	343	165	4	2-24	41.25
H Bagshaw	R M	32	9	2	2-9	4.50
GB Barrington	round arm Sl	48	27	1	1-27	27.00
H Slater	R M	152	92	1	1-43	92.00
W Storer	? LB	32	18	0		
G Ratcliffe		12	8	0		

Leading first class bowlers for Derbyshire by wickets taken
Name	Balls	Runs	Wkts	BBI	Ave
G Davidson	1559	789	36	6-43	21.08
W Cropper	1248	503	27	6-50	18.62
GG Walker	673	319	15	5-49	21.26
J J Hulme	800	388	9	4-120	43.11
W Chatterton		182	5	3-40	36.40(a)

(a) Figures recalculated to exclude non Derbyshire matches

=== Wicket keeping ===
- James Disney Catches 12 Stumping 1

== See also ==
- Derbyshire County Cricket Club seasons
- 1887 English cricket season
