= Stubbings (surname) =

Stubbings is a surname.

The vast movement of people that followed the Norman Conquest of England of 1066 brought the Stubbings family name to the British Isles. They lived in Essex having derived from the Old English word stybbing, meaning stumps, and indicates that the original bearer lived in or near an area which had been cleared of trees.

Notable people with the surname include:

- Betty Stubbings, English bowls player
- James Stubbings (1856–1912), English cricketer
- Steve Stubbings (born 1978), English cricketer
- Walter Stubbings (1870–1949), English cricketer

== See also ==
- Stubing
