= Matthew Walton (disambiguation) =

Matthew Walton may refer to:

- Matthew Walton (died 1819), U.S. representative from Kentucky
- Matthew Walton (cricketer) (1837–1888), English cricketer
- Matt Walton (born 1973), American actor
