= Frank Mycroft =

English cricketer (1873–1900)

Personal information
- Full name: Frank Mycroft
- Born: 30 June 1873; Shirland, Derbyshire, England
- Died: 26 September 1900 (aged 27); Leicester, England
- Batting: Left-handed

Domestic team information
- Years: Team
- 1894–1895: Derbyshire
- FC debut: 9 July 1894 Derbyshire v Yorkshire
- Last FC: 8 July 1895 Derbyshire v Yorkshire

Career statistics
Competition	First-class
Matches	2
Runs scored	7
Batting average	1.75
100s/50s	0/0
Top score	4
Catches/stumpings	4/0
- Source: CricketArchive, January 2012

Frank Mycroft (30 June 1873 – 26 September 1900) was an English cricketer who played for Derbyshire County Cricket Club between 1894 and 1895.

Mycroft was born in Shirland Toadhole Furnace, Derbyshire, the son of Matthew Mycroft, a farmer of 70 acres (280,000 m^{2}), and his wife Eliza. Mycroft started playing for Derbyshire in the 1893 season before they were included in the County Championship. He was a wicket-keeper for the club and played in two first-class matches both against Yorkshire in the 1894 and 1895 seasons, standing in for the regular wicket-keeper William Storer. Mycroft was a left-handed batsman who was last man in his matches.

Mycroft died in 1900 in Leicester, at the age of 27.
