= Frederick Keeton =

English cricketer (1855–1911)

Personal information
- Full name: Frederick William Keeton
- Born: 26 October 1855; Mosborough, England
- Died: 27 November 1911 (aged 56); Bolton, Lancashire, England
- Batting: Right-handed
- Bowling: Right-arm medium

Domestic team information
- Years: Team
- 1876–1880: Derbyshire
- FC debut: 2 July 1876 Derbyshire v Lancashire
- Last FC: 19 August 1880 Derbyshire v Yorkshire

Career statistics
Competition	First-class
Matches	3
Runs scored	33
Batting average	5.50
100s/50s	0/0
Top score	9
Catches/stumpings	1/–
- Source: CricketArchive, 17 January 2011

Frederick William Keeton (26 October 1855 – 27 November 1911) was an English cricketer who played for Derbyshire between 1876 and 1880.

Keeton was born in Mosborough (then in Derbyshire but now in South Yorkshire). In 1874, he played for Worksop, before making his debut for Derbyshire during the 1876 season against Lancashire, where he scored a handful of runs, and the team lost the game. His next appearance was in the 1879 season in a game against Marylebone Cricket Club, where he was run out after scoring six runs and was out lbw for five runs, contributing to Derbyshire's loss by fifteen runs. Keeton made his final first-class appearance during the 1880 season, when he made his top score of nine in an innings defeat to Yorkshire.

Keeton was a right-handed batsman and a right-arm medium-pace round-arm bowler who played 6 innings in 3 first-class matches with a top score of 9 and an average of 5.50. He never had the chance to bowl.

Keeton was a licensed victualler and, by 1884, was the licensee of the County Hotel in Chesterfield. He played a couple of games for Derbyshire in 1888 when the team was not competing in the championship.

Keeton died in Bolton, Lancashire, at the age of 56.
