= Stubing =

Stubing is a surname, likely of German origin. Notable people with the surname include:

- Merrill Stubing, fictional ship captain
- Moose Stubing (1938–2018), American professional baseball scout, minor league manager, and Major League Baseball third-base coach
- Solvi Stubing (1941–2017), German actress and TV personality

== See also ==
- Cases of Stübing v. Germany, a series of criminal prosecutions involving incest
- Jeff Stuebing (born 1959), Canadian wrestler
- Stubbings (surname)
