= George Ratcliffe (cricketer, born 1856) =

English cricketer

Personal information
- Full name: George Ratcliffe
- Born: 1 April 1856; Ilkeston, Derbyshire, England
- Died: 7 March 1928 (aged 71); Nottingham, England
- Batting: Left-handed

Domestic team information
- Years: Team
- 1887–1889: Derbyshire
- First-class debut: 27 June 1887 Derbyshire v Yorkshire
- Last First-class: 15 August 1887 Derbyshire v Surrey

Career statistics
Competition	First-class
Matches	5
Runs scored	145
Batting average	14.50
100s/50s	0/1
Top score	64
Balls bowled	12
Wickets	0
Bowling average	–
5 wickets in innings	–
10 wickets in match	–
Best bowling	–
Catches/stumpings	0/–
- Source: CricketArchive, February 2012

George Ratcliffe (born George Ratcliff 1 April 1856 — 7 March 1928) was an English cricketer who played for Derbyshire from 1887 to 1889.

Ratcliffe was born in Ilkeston, Derbyshire, the son of George Ratcliff, a coal miner, and his wife Priscilla. He became a butcher.

Ratcliffe made his debut for Derbyshire in the 1887 season in a match in June against Surrey. In this he scored 64, but his average fell from this point in his remaining four first-class matches. At the end of the season Derbyshire left the championship but Ratcliffe continued to play for the club in the 1888 and 1889 season. Ratcliffe was a left-handed middle-upper order batsman and played in 10 innings in 5 first-class matches. He bowled two overs but did not take a wicket.

Ratcliffe died in Nottingham at the age of 71.
