= Dan Doyle (footballer) =

Scottish footballer

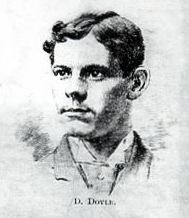
- Portrait of Doyle in 1892

Personal information
- Full name: Daniel Doyle
- Date of birth: 16 September 1864
- Place of birth: Paisley, Scotland
- Date of death: 8 April 1918 (aged 53)
- Place of death: Glasgow, Scotland
- Position: Left back

Youth career
- Rawyards
- Slamannan Barnsmuir
- Broxburn Shamrock

Senior career*
Years	Team	Apps	(Gls)
1888	Hibernian	0	(0)
1888	East Stirlingshire		
1888	Sunderland Albion		
1888–1889	Grimsby Town		
1889	Bolton Wanderers		
1889–1891	Everton	42	(0)
1891–1899	Celtic	113	(4)

International career
1892–1898	Scotland	8	(0)
1892–1899	Scottish League XI	10	(0)
- * Club domestic league appearances and goals

Daniel Doyle (16 September 1864 – 9 April 1918) was a Scottish footballer who played for among others, East Stirlingshire, Hibernian, Sunderland Albion, Grimsby Town (where a collision with opponent William Cropper in an 1889 match led to the other player's death - an inquest cleared Doyle of any wrongdoing), Bolton Wanderers, Everton (where he partnered Andrew Hannah in defence as the club won their first Football League title in 1890–91), Celtic (where he won four Scottish Football League championships – becoming the first player to win a league title on both sides of the border), and the Scotland national team.

He won a total of eight caps for Scotland between 1892 and 1898, and also represented the Scottish League XI ten times.

He died from cancer at his home in Glasgow in April 1918.

== See also ==
- List of Scotland national football team captains
