= William Walton (cricketer, born 1862) =

English cricketer

Personal information
- Full name: William Walton
- Born: 7 August 1862; Glossop, Derbyshire, England
- Died: 16 February 1925 (aged 62); Glossop, England
- Batting: Right-handed

Domestic team information
- Years: Team
- 1887: Derbyshire
- Only FC: 28 July 1887 Derbyshire v Surrey

Career statistics
| Competition | First-class |
|---|---|
| Matches | 1 |
| Runs scored | 4 |
| Batting average | 2.00 |
| 100s/50s | 0/0 |
| Top score | 3 |
| Catches/stumpings | 0/– |
- Source: CricketArchive, February 2012

William Walton (7 August 1862 – 16 February 1925) was an English cricketer who played for Derbyshire in 1887.

Walton was born in Glossop, Derbyshire, the son of Matthew Walton, manager of a cotton mill, and his wife Elizabeth. His father appeared in one match for Lancashire in 1867.

Walton started playing for Derbyshire in the 1887 season taking part in two non-qualifying matches before his one first-class game in July against Surrey. He was an opening batsman but made little impression. Derbyshire were out of the Championship in 1888 and Walton played two more matches for them in the 1893 season.

Walton died at Glossop at the age of 62.
