= Fred Spofforth =

Australian cricketer (1853–1926)

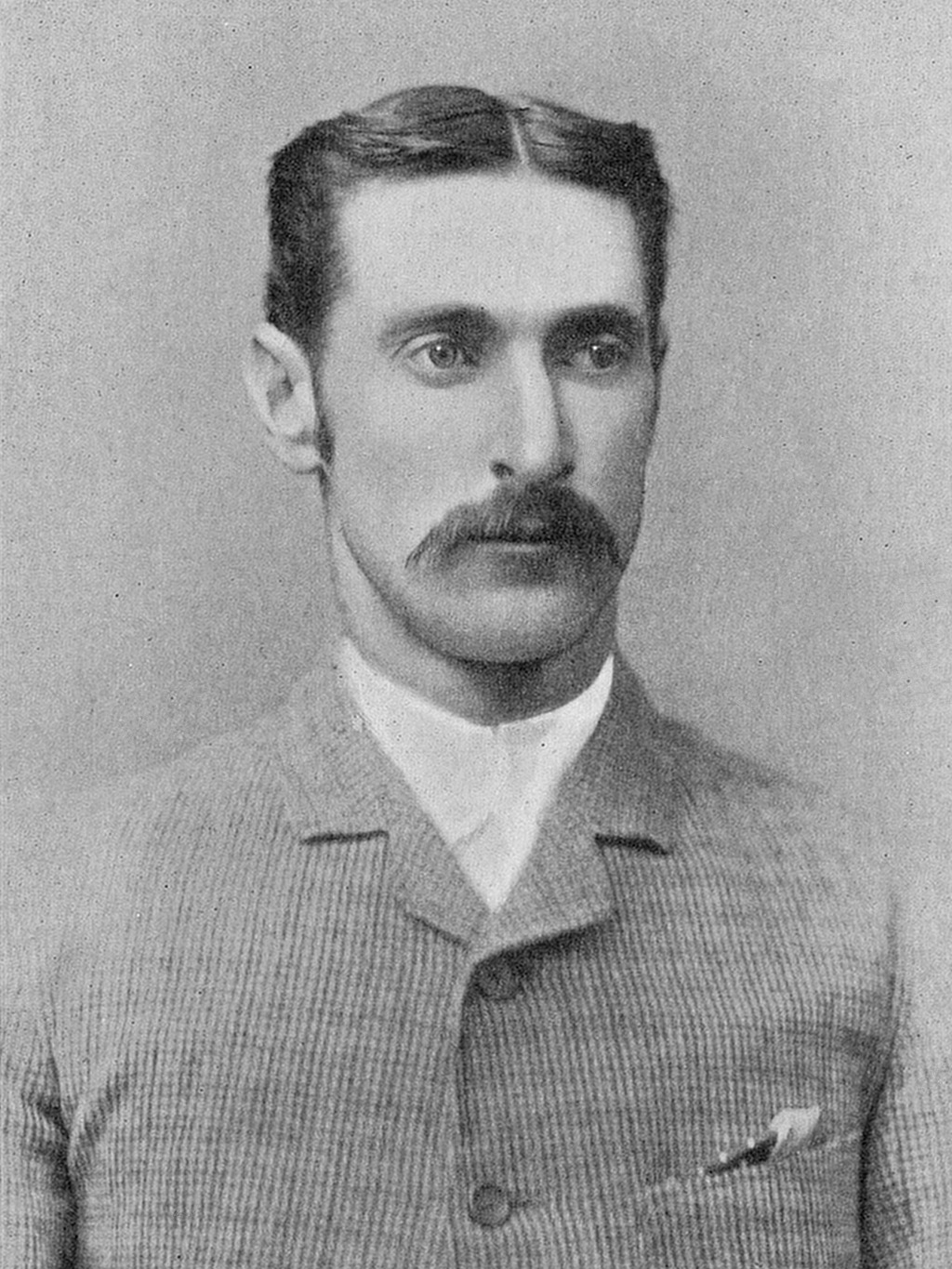
- Spofforth in about 1897

Personal information
- Full name: Frederick Robert Spofforth
- Born: 9 September 1853; Balmain, New South Wales, Australia
- Died: 4 June 1926 (aged 72); Long Ditton, Surrey, England
- Nickname: The Demon Bowler
- Height: 6 ft 3 in (1.91 m)
- Batting: Right-handed
- Bowling: Right arm fast-medium
- Role: Bowler

International information
- National side: Australia (1877–1887)
- Test debut (cap 14): 31 March 1877 v England
- Last Test: 31 January 1887 v England

Domestic team information
- Years: Team
- 1874–1885: New South Wales
- 1885–1888: Victoria
- 1889–1891: Derbyshire

Career statistics
| Competition | Test | First-class |
|---|---|---|
| Matches | 18 | 155 |
| Runs scored | 217 | 1,928 |
| Batting average | 9.43 | 9.88 |
| 100s/50s | 0/1 | 0/3 |
| Top score | 50 | 56 |
| Balls bowled | 4,185 | 30,593 |
| Wickets | 94 | 853 |
| Bowling average | 18.41 | 14.95 |
| 5 wickets in innings | 7 | 84 |
| 10 wickets in match | 4 | 32 |
| Best bowling | 7/44 | 9/18 |
| Catches/stumpings | 11/– | 83/– |
- Source: Cricinfo, 25 March 2015

Frederick Robert Spofforth (9 September 1853 – 4 June 1926), also known as "The Demon Bowler", was an Australian cricket team pace bowler of the nineteenth century. He was the first bowler to take 50 Test wickets, and the first to take a Test hat-trick, in 1879. He played in Test matches for Australia between 1877 and 1887, and then settled in England where he played for Derbyshire. In 2009, he was inducted into the ICC Hall of Fame.

== Early life ==
Spofforth was born in the Sydney suburb of Balmain, the son of Yorkshire-born Edward Spofforth, a director in the Bank of New South Wales, and his wife Anna, née McDonnell. Spofforth spent his early childhood in Hokianga, New Zealand and was later educated privately at the Reverend John Pendrill's Eglinton House on Glebe Road and, for a short time, at Sydney Grammar School.

Spofforth was thereafter employed by the Bank of New South Wales as a clerk.

== Cricket career in Australia ==
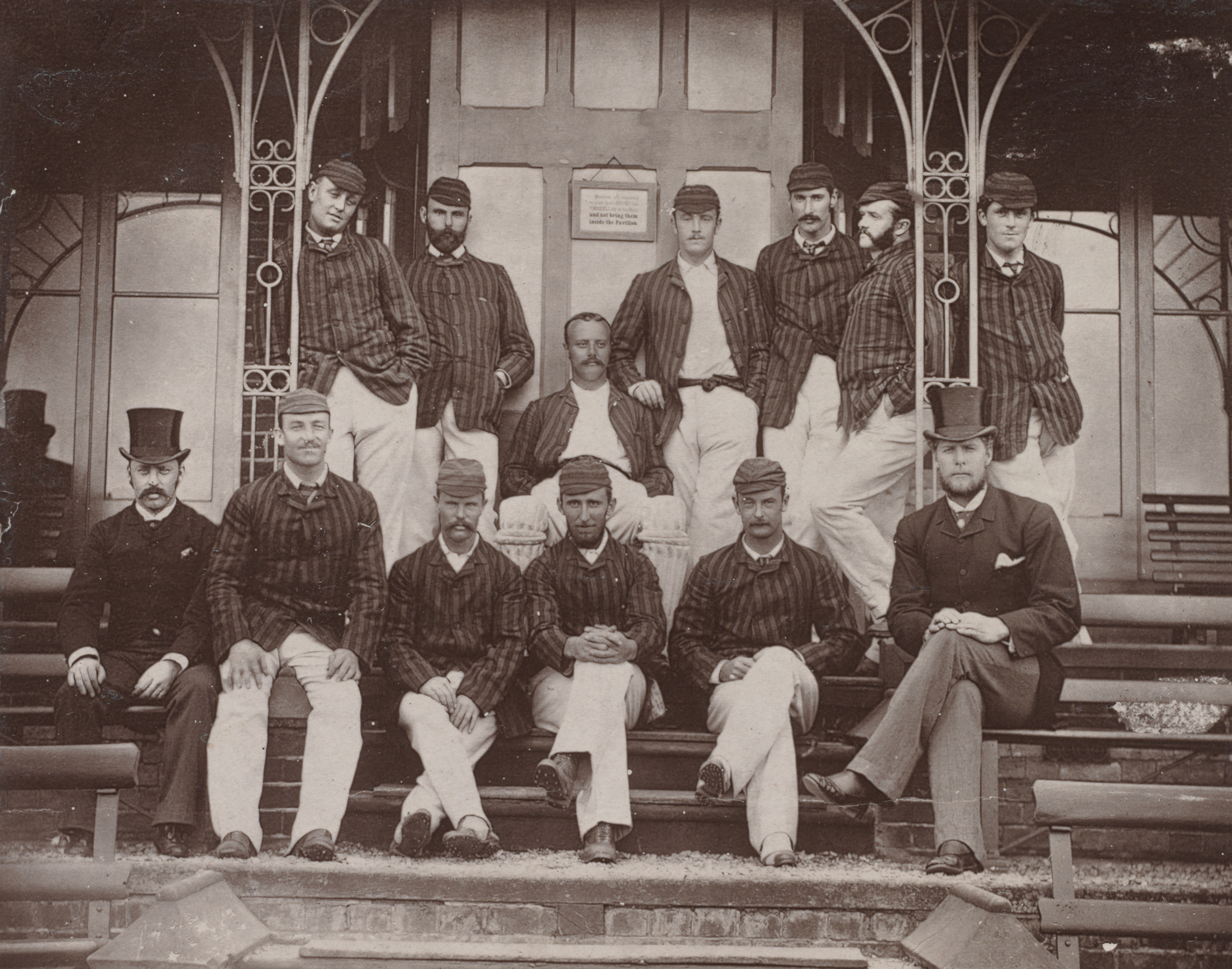
Spofforth (back row, third from right) with the Australian Cricket Team (1882)

He began his life as a bowler with underarm "lobs" but changed his style when he saw the great England quick bowlers on their tour of the colonies in 1863/64. He decided that he would pursue the overarm action and spent many years mastering it. Spofforth came to notice as a member of the New South Wales eighteen in January 1874 when he took two wickets for sixteen in a match against W.G. Grace's English eleven. He was a regular representative of the New South Wales team in intercolonial fixtures and, in the December 1877 game, went in second wicket down to make 25, the highest score in either innings in a low-scoring match. Although he batted reasonably well during the 1878 and 1880 Australian tours in England, from then he concentrated almost solely on his bowling and established a tremendous reputation.

Spofforth played his first Test match in 1877 in Melbourne. It was the second match of the first-ever Test series, against an English team led by James Lillywhite, Jr. Spofforth took three wickets in the first innings and another in the second, but England went on to win the match by four wickets. He had boycotted the First Test because of Jack Blackham's selection as wicket-keeper ahead of Spofforth's close friend and fellow New South Welshman Billy Murdoch.

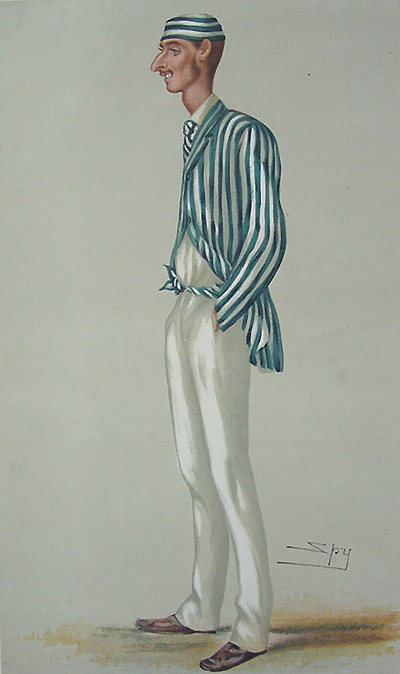
"The Demon Bowler" Spofforth as caricatured by Spy (Leslie Ward) in Vanity Fair, July 1878

Spofforth truly announced himself to the cricketing world on 27 May 1878, when the touring Australians met the MCC at Lord's. In this, the second match of the tour, the might of the MCC was dismissed twice in one day at the fortress of English cricket for paltry scores of just 33 and 19. The colonists won by nine wickets, with Spofforth picking up ten wickets for 20 runs after first clean-bowling Grace for a duck. Tom "Felix" Horan records that, when he did so, "he jumped about two feet in the air, and sang out: 'Bowled! Bowled! Bowled!' And at the finish in the dressing-room, he said: 'Ain't I a demon? Ain't I a demon?' gesticulating the while in his well-known demonaic style. Whether or not he christened himself the demon, he certainly was a demon bowler." Spofforth confirms this: "To myself, it will always be a noteworthy occasion, since it was then that I first earned my popular sobriquet – 'the Demon'."

As a consequence of this victory, writes Plum Warner, the "fame of Australian cricket was established for all time." Spofforth became known forever as "The Demon Bowler" (a title which first adorned John "Foghorn" Jackson in the 1850s). He was the bowler whom English batsmen most feared and is also regarded as the one who first brought into the game, as a scaring technique, eye-to-eye contact with the batsman. Spofforth would often stare straight into the batsman's eyes to scare and shake him.

During the 1878 tour Spofforth was credited with as many as 110 wickets at an average of under 10½ runs, besides having the respectable batting average of 13 for 28 innings.

This worked to particularly devastating effect in the match that gave birth to the legendary Ashes series, at The Oval on 29 August 1882. In their second innings, England required a mere 85 runs to clinch the match, but Spofforth refused to give up – "Boys," he said famously, "this thing can be done"—and led his team to a remarkable victory, one of the closest ever in the history of Test cricket. The Australians won by seven runs, Spofforth taking match figures of fourteen for ninety.

During the January Test match of the 1879 Lord Harris' England tour of Australia, played on the Melbourne Cricket Ground, Spofforth became the first man to get a hat-trick in Test cricket, dismissing Vernon Royle, Francis MacKinnon and Tom Emmett in three successive deliveries. This was the highlight of a brilliant bowling performance which brought him 13 wickets for 110 runs. In February, Spofforth also played for New South Wales against Lord Harris' tourists in a game that, on the Saturday, descended into the Sydney riot of 1879.

Although not noted as a batsman, he once top-scored in a Test from the unlikely starting position of number eleven. He hit 50 against England at Melbourne in 1884–85; the next-highest score by an Australian in the match was 35.

Fred Spofforth played his last Test match in Sydney in January 1887 in which he bowled twelve overs, conceded seventeen runs and took one wicket. England won the match by 13 runs. He represented New South Wales from 1874 to 1885 and Victoria from 1885 to 1887.

== Life in England ==
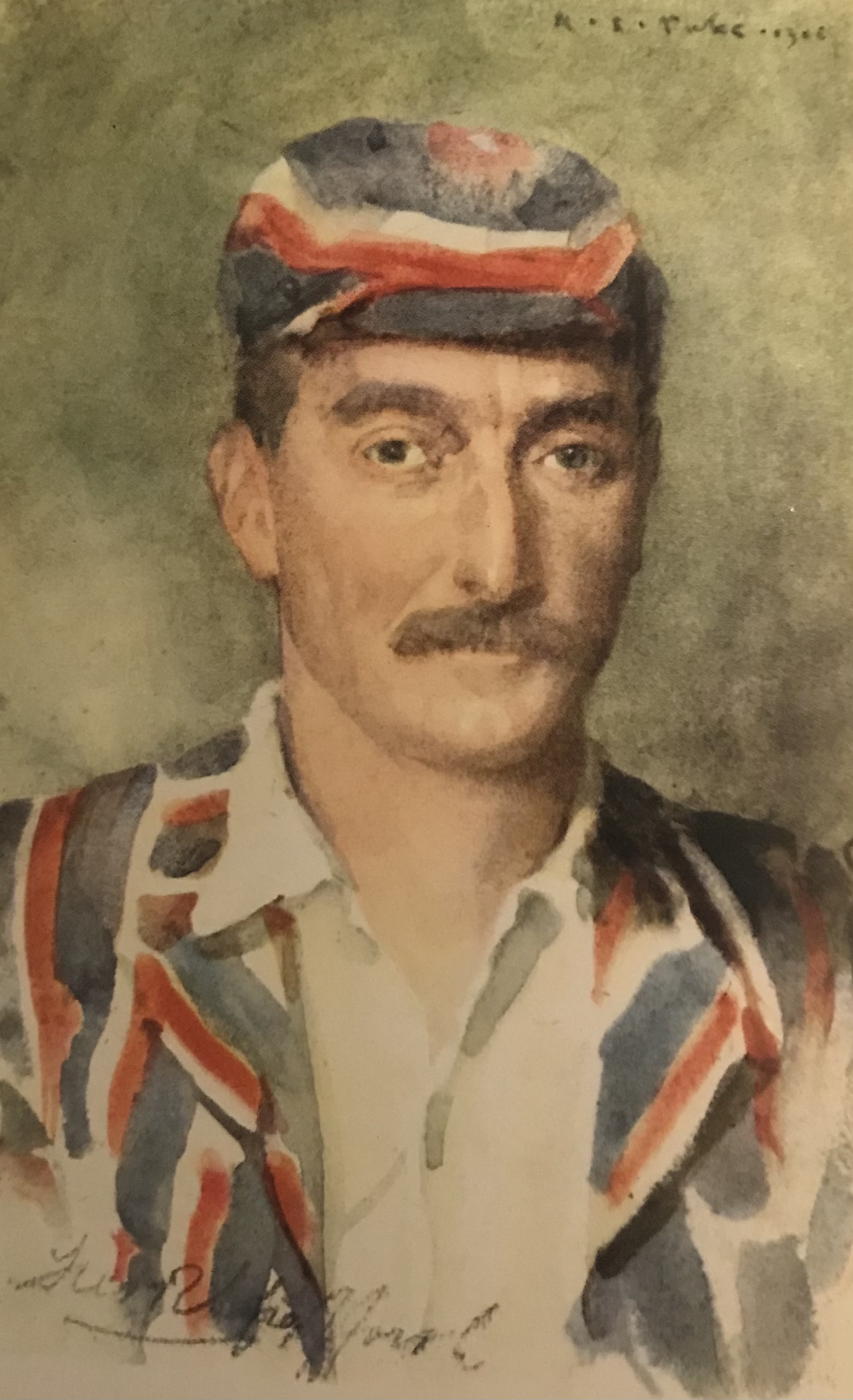
Spofforth by Henry Scott Tuke, c. 1898

Spofforth married Phillis Marsh Cadman in Breadsall, Derbyshire, in September 1886, at the end of the Australian tour. At first they lived in Australia, but in 1888 they returned to England, settling in Derbyshire near Phillis's family. Spofforth had a position in his father-in-law's tea company.

The Derbyshire County Cricket Club tried unsuccessfully to persuade the County Cricket Council to allow Spofforth to play for Derbyshire without waiting for the usual two years' residential qualification. However, Yorkshire were willing to waive the point so that Spofforth could play against them in two matches in the 1889 season. In one of these games he took fifteen Yorkshire wickets for 81 runs. With the residential qualification met in the following year, Spofforth was able not only to play for Derbyshire but to captain the team in the 1890 season. In 1890 Derbyshire was found to be in deep financial crisis and Spofforth played a key part in identifying a fraud that had been committed. The cricket club's losses amounted to £1000 and the Derby County Football Club had also been raided. Samuel Richardson the club's first captain had become an administrator of the club in 1880, and in 1884 the remit had been extended to the associated Derby County Football Club. Richardson admitted his guilt and fled the country in disgrace and settled in Madrid.

In 1896, Spofforth, playing for MCC, although in his forty-third year, took eight wickets for 74 against Yorkshire. He played club cricket for Hampstead for some years after 1890 and secured a large number of wickets at a low cost.

Spofforth became the managing director of the Star Tea Company which belonged to his wife's father and was very successful. He revisited Australia on more than one occasion and retained his interest in the game to the end.

Spofforth died on the eve of the 1926 Ashes series (some of which he had wanted to see) from chronic colitis at Long Ditton, Surrey. He left a fortune of £164,000. He is buried in Brookwood Cemetery (Plot 28).

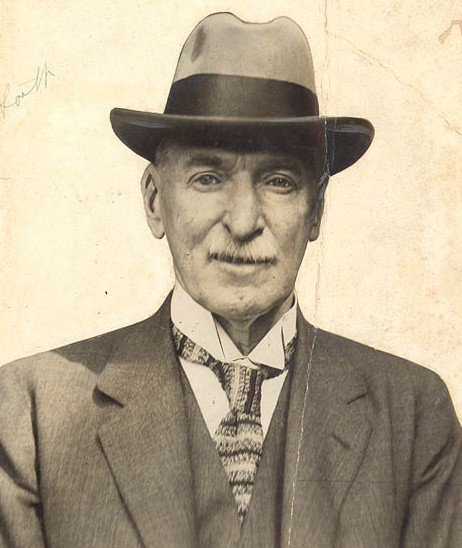
Spofforth in later years

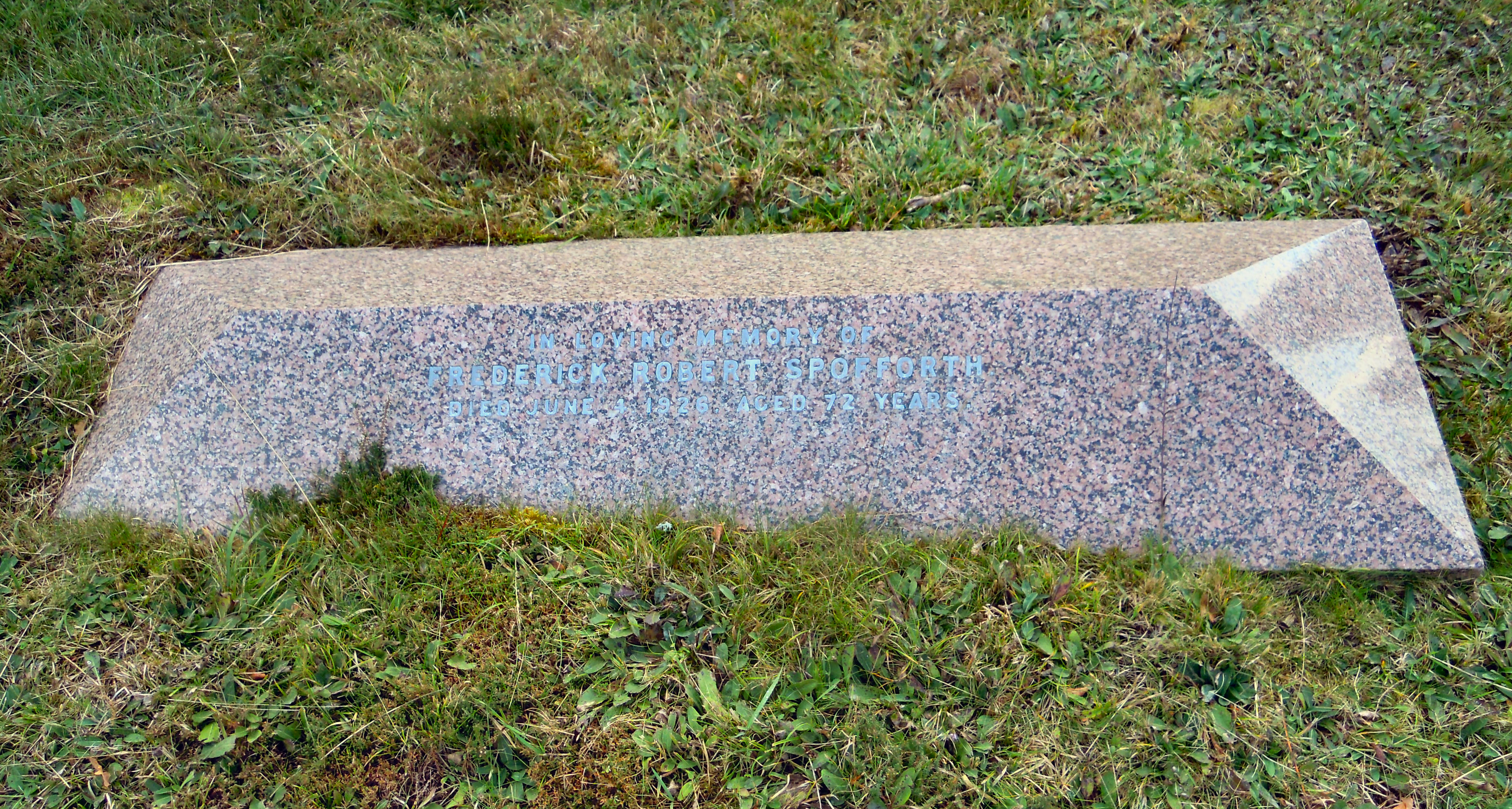
Spofforth's grave in Brookwood Cemetery

== Critique ==
Spofforth was lean but very strong at 6' 3" tall (190.5 cm) and weighing in at 12½ stone (80 kg). He began as a fast bowler, although he did not have a very long run. After the 1878 tour, as he began to study medium-paced and slow bowling, his speed quietened down to fast medium-pace with an occasional extra-fast or -slow ball thrown in; "his objective", according to John Trumble, "being a completely disguised combination of the three paces; and those who saw him bowling at his best will remember to what perfection he attained in this direction. His action on delivery was exactly the same for all of the three paces, and it was in his magnificent concealment of change in the pace of his bowling that he stood out from all other bowlers of all time."

Also influencing the general slackening of pace was his discovery that, on the softer English wickets, his break from the off (known then as the "break back") was sharpened when he bowled slower, and only once on the 1882 tour did he resort to his full speed (in unsuccessful retaliation to Grace's perceived as unsporting run-out of Sammy Jones in the Test match). Using the break back, he was able to have a large proportion of his victims bowled; seven of his ten wickets in the 1878 match against the MCC were taken in that fashion. Of his 94 wickets in Test matches, 50 were bowled out.

Spofforth might also have been the original inventor of swing bowling (or "swerve", as it was then known). According to Grace, Spofforth first started implementing it during or after the 1878 tour. It is unknown whether or not he had an outswinger, but he could definitely shape the ball back in to the right-handers.

Spofforth's bowling average was not very low for his era, but he always attacked, and he dismissed a great many batsmen. Lord Hawke, who played first-class cricket for a great many years, considered him to be the most difficult bowler he had ever played against. He was often called the best bowler in the game, and he was particularly effective bowling to W.G. Grace, the best batsman of the era.

In 1996 he was posthumously included in the Australian Cricket Hall of Fame as one of the ten inaugural inductees along with Jack Blackham, Victor Trumper, Clarrie Grimmett, Bill Ponsford, Don Bradman, Bill O'Reilly, Keith Miller, Ray Lindwall and Dennis Lillee. A sculpture of Spofforth by Cathy Weiszmann was unveiled at the Sydney Cricket Ground on 5 January 2008.

== Bibliography ==
- Barker, Ralph: Ten Great Bowlers (Chatto & Windus, 1967).
- Cashman, Richard: The "Demon" Spofforth (New South Wales University Press, 1990, ISBN 0-86840-004-1; Walla Wall Press, 2014, ISBN 978-1-876718-22-0).
- Spofforth, Fred: The Demon Speaks: Recollections and Reminiscences (CreateSpace, 2015, ISBN 1-50856-422-1).

Sporting positions
| Preceded by William Chatterton | Derbyshire cricket captains 1890 | Succeeded by Sydney Evershed |
Records
| Preceded by Tom Kendall | Most career wickets in Test cricket 94 wickets (18.41) in 17 Tests; Held record 4 January 1879 to 12 January 1895 | Succeeded by Johnny Briggs |
