= George Barrington (cricketer) =

English cricketer

Personal information
- Full name: George Bainbridge Barrington
- Born: 20 April 1857; Pimlico, London, England
- Died: 29 March 1942 (aged 84); Kirk Langley, England
- Batting: Right-handed
- Bowling: Right-arm slow

Domestic team information
- Years: Team
- 1880–1887: Derbyshire
- FC debut: 17 May 1880 Derbyshire v Australians
- Last FC: 27 June 1887 Derbyshire v Yorkshire

Career statistics
| Competition | First-class |
|---|---|
| Matches | 25 |
| Runs scored | 455 |
| Batting average | 9.68 |
| 100s/50s | 0/1 |
| Top score | 50 |
| Balls bowled | 48 |
| Wickets | 1 |
| Bowling average | 27.00 |
| 5 wickets in innings | 0 |
| 10 wickets in match | 0 |
| Best bowling | 1/27 |
| Catches/stumpings | 7/– |
- Source: CricketArchive, 2 February 2011

George Bainbridge Barrington (20 April 1857 – 29 March 1942) was an English cricketer who played first-class cricket for Derbyshire between 1880 and 1887.

Barrington was born in Pimlico, London, the son of G Barrington. He was educated at Repton School but did not play for the school side as he left in 1873 aged 16. He made several successful appearances for the Derbyshire Friars cricket club and played miscellaneous games for Derbyshire in the 1879 season against Harrow Wanderers and the Derbyshire Colts. He made his first-class debut for Derbyshire in the 1880 season against a team of touring Australians, in which he scored a duck in his first innings but became the top scorer for the team in the second, making 24 before he was run out. Barrington played his debut County match three days later against Lancashire, in which he made 24 again and 20. He appeared later in the season for Gentlemen of Derbyshire during a Canadian tour of England, in a match which the Derbyshire team won by an innings and 229 runs. Barrington was struggling for consistent form in the upper order but excelled when partnered by specialist bowlers rather than specialist batsmen. The 1881 season started less promisingly, though he was once again given a chance in the upper order. Barrington only played one County match between the end of 1881 and the beginning of 1884, though when he returned for the team, in the first game of the 1884 season, his first game, against Sussex, included his first and only half-century of his career, once again batting in the opening order. He returned for Derbyshire during the 1887 season and in his last game failed to score.

Barrington was a right-handed batsman and played 48 innings in 25 first-class matches with an average of 9.68 and a top score of 50. He was a round-arm slow bowler and took 1 first-class wicket for 27 runs.

Barrington died at the age of 84 in Kirk Langley where he is remembered by the G B Barrington Playing Fields.
