= Joseph Marshall (sportsman) =

English cricketer and footballer

Personal information
- Born: 25 July 1862; Ripley, Derbyshire, England
- Died: 15 January 1913 (aged 50); Derby, England
- Batting: Right-handed

Domestic team information
- Years: Team
- 1887: Derbyshire
- FC debut: 28 July 1887 Derbyshire v Surrey
- Last FC: 15 August 1887 Derbyshire v Surrey

Career statistics
Competition	First-class
Matches	2
Runs scored	50
Batting average	12.50
100s/50s	0/0
Top score	31
Catches/stumpings	1/–
- Source: CricketArchive, 22 March 2018
Association football career
- Position: Goalkeeper
Senior career*
Years	Team	Apps	(Gls)
1886	Staveley	?	(?)
1888–1889	Derby County	16	(0)
1889	Derby Junction	?	(?)
- * Club domestic league appearances and goals

Joseph Marshall (24 April 1862 – 15 January 1913) was an English cricketer who played first-class cricket for Derbyshire in 1887. He also played football for Derby County.

== Cricket career ==
Marshall was born in Ripley, Derbyshire. He made his debut for Derbyshire in the 1887 season against Surrey and his only other first-class game was also against Surrey that season. After Derbyshire lost first-class status, Marshall continued to play for the club with single games in the 1888 season and 1890 season. Marshall was a right-handed batsman and played four innings in two first-class matches with a top score of 31 and an average of 12.50.

Marshall died in Derby at the age of 50.

== Football career ==
His football career started with Staveley. By 1887 Derby County had signed Marshall as a first-team goalkeeper. Joseph Marshall made his League debut on 8 September 1888, playing as a goalkeeper, at Pike's Lane the then home of Bolton Wanderers. Derby County defeated the home team 6–3. Joseph Marshall was Derby County' oldest player from his League debut on 8 September 1888, until 29 September 1888 when he was surpassed, in age, by Levi Wright. As a goalkeeper (16 appearances) he played in a Derby County defence that achieved one clean–sheet and restricted the opposition to one–League–goal–in–a–match on three separate occasions.

Marshall left Derby County in 1889 and he joined Derby Junction.
