= Henry Street (cricketer) =

English cricketer

Personal information
- Full name: Henry Street
- Born: 18 April 1863; Riddings, Derbyshire, England
- Died: 12 March 1953 (aged 89); Riddings, England
- Batting: Right-handed

Domestic team information
- Years: Team
- 1887: Derbyshire
- FC debut: 7 July 1887 Derbyshire v Lancashire
- Last FC: 18 July 1887 Derbyshire v Yorkshire

Career statistics
Competition	First-class
Matches	2
Runs scored	24
Batting average	8.00
100s/50s	0/0
Top score	15*
Catches/stumpings	1/–
- Source: CricketArchive, February 2012

Henry Street (18 April 1863 — 12 March 1953) was an English cricketer who played for Derbyshire in 1887.

Street was born in Riddings, Derbyshire, the son of Henry Street, a coal miner, and his wife Ann. In 1881 he was living with his parents at Alfreton where he was also a coal miner. Street made his first-class debut for Derbyshire in the 1887 season in July against Lancashire when he ended the game at 15 not out. In his second match against Yorkshire he made 9. He played no more first-class matches, but took part in a miscellaneous game against Essex. Street was a right hand batsman and played three innings in two first-class matches, with an average of 8 and a top score of 15 not out.

Street died at Riddings at the age of 89.
