= William Pedley =

English cricketer and civil engineer

William Everard Pedley
Personal information
- Full name: William Everard Pedley
- Born: 16 June 1858; Wingerworth, Derbyshire, England
- Died: 9 July 1920 (aged 62); Riverside, California, USA
- Batting: Right-handed
- Bowling: Right-arm medium

Domestic team information
- Years: Team
- 1879: Sussex
- 1888: Derbyshire
- FC debut: 31 July 1879 Sussex v Kent
- Last FC: 4 August 1879 Sussex v Surrey

Career statistics
| Competition | First-class |
|---|---|
| Matches | 2 |
| Runs scored | 45 |
| Batting average | 15.00 |
| 100s/50s | 0/0 |
| Top score | 16* |
| Balls bowled | 300 |
| Wickets | 10 |
| Bowling average | 13.80 |
| 5 wickets in innings | 1 |
| 10 wickets in match | 0 |
| Best bowling | 7/36 |
| Catches/stumpings | 0/– |
- Source: CricketArchive, February 2012

William Everard Pedley (16 June 1858 – 9 July 1920) was an English civil engineer and cricketer who played first-class cricket for Sussex. After emigrating to the United States he became a well known irrigation engineer in Southern California. He gave his name to the community of Pedley, California, now a neighborhood within the city of Jurupa Valley, California.

== England ==
Pedley was born at Stubbing Court, Wingerworth, Derbyshire, the son of Thomas Humphrey Pedley and his wife Mary Gully, daughter of John Gully. He joined the Royal Engineers and in 1877 became a member of the Institution of Civil Engineers. In 1879 Pedley played two matches for Sussex against Kent and Surrey. Against Kent he took 7 for 36 and was not out on 16 in his second innings to help Sussex to victory. He also played for the Royal Engineers and Gentlemen of Sussex. Pedley next appeared playing for his native Derbyshire in the 1888 season.

== California ==
Pedley went to America where he was manager of the San Jacinto Land Company, who developed part of the Sobrante de San Jacinto land grant at Riverside, California. He was the designer, builder, and engineer of the irrigation system that was installed. He gave his name to the settlement of Pedley, California in 1903 or 1904 when the Union Pacific Railroad Company installed a switch and a railroad station at the location. His name was also given to the nearby Pedley Hills, a low lying mountain range, also within the Jurupa Valley city limits.

== Sports ==
In Cricket, Pedley was a right-hand batsman and played four innings in two first-class matches with an average of 15 and a top score of 16 not out. He was a right-arm medium pace bowler and took 10 first-class wickets at an average of 13.80 and a best performance of 7 for 36.

In California Pedley became a regular Polo player on the local fields and a member of the Riverside polo team, keeping his own stable of polo horses. His son, Eric became a professional player and a three-time winner of the U.S. Open Polo Championship.

== Death ==
Pedley died in Los Angeles, California at the Good Samaritan Hospital. He was 62. While on a road trip he took ill and was taken to the Los Angeles hospital where he was diagnosed with ptomaine poisoning, and died shortly thereafter. His funeral services were held at the All Saints Episcopal Church in Riverside, and he was interred at the Olivewood Cemetery.
