= Edwin Coup =

English cricketer

Personal information
- Full name: Edwin Coup
- Born: 9 January 1861; Ripley, Derbyshire, England
- Died: 2 July 1892 (aged 31); Mickleover, England
- Batting: Left-handed

Domestic team information
- Years: Team
- 1885–1887: Derbyshire
- FC debut: 13 August 1885 Derbyshire v Hampshire
- Last FC: 15 August 1887 Derbyshire v Surrey

Career statistics
Competition	First-class
Matches	13
Runs scored	195
Batting average	8.47
100s/50s	0/0
Top score	33
Catches/stumpings	2/–
- Source: CricketArchive, 30 August 2011

Edwin Coup (9 June 1861 – 2 July 1892), also known as Edwin Coupe, was an English cricketer who played for Derbyshire County Cricket Club between 1885 and 1887.

Coup was born in Ripley, Derbyshire, the son of John Coupe a building contractor and his wife Martha. Coup trained as an architect and made his debut for Derbyshire in the 1885 season in August in a victory against Hampshire. He played eight matches in the 1886 season and achieved his best single-innings total of 33. He played occasionally in the 1887 season which was his last season for the club. Coup was a left-handed batsman and played 26 innings in 13 first-class matches with an average of 8.47 and a top score of 33.

Coup died in Mickleover at the age of 31.
