= Walter Stubbings =

English cricketer

Personal information
- Born: 4 September 1870; Whitwell, Derbyshire, England
- Died: 28 November 1949 (aged 79); Wakefield, England
- Relatives: James Stubbings (brother)

Domestic team information
- Years: Team
- 1900: Derbyshire
- Only FC: 13 August 1900 Derbyshire v Essex

Career statistics
Competition	First-class
Matches	1
Runs scored	9
Batting average	9.00
100s/50s	0/0
Top score	9*
Balls bowled	120
Wickets	0
Bowling average	–
5 wickets in innings	–
10 wickets in match	–
Best bowling	–
Catches/stumpings	0/–
- Source: CricketArchive, April 2012

Walter Stubbings (4 September 1870 – 28 November 1949) was an English cricketer who played for Derbyshire in 1900.

Stubbings was born in Whitwell, Derbyshire, the son of James Stubbings, a mason, and his wife Ann. He made just one first-class appearance for the Derbyshire side, in a match against Essex during the 1900 season. Stubbings bowled uneconomically, and his only batting contribution was a second innings tally of 9 not out.

Stubbings' brother, James, fourteen years his senior, played in five first-class matches during the 1880s.

Stubbings died in Wakefield at the age of 79.
