= Harry Bagshaw =

English cricketer

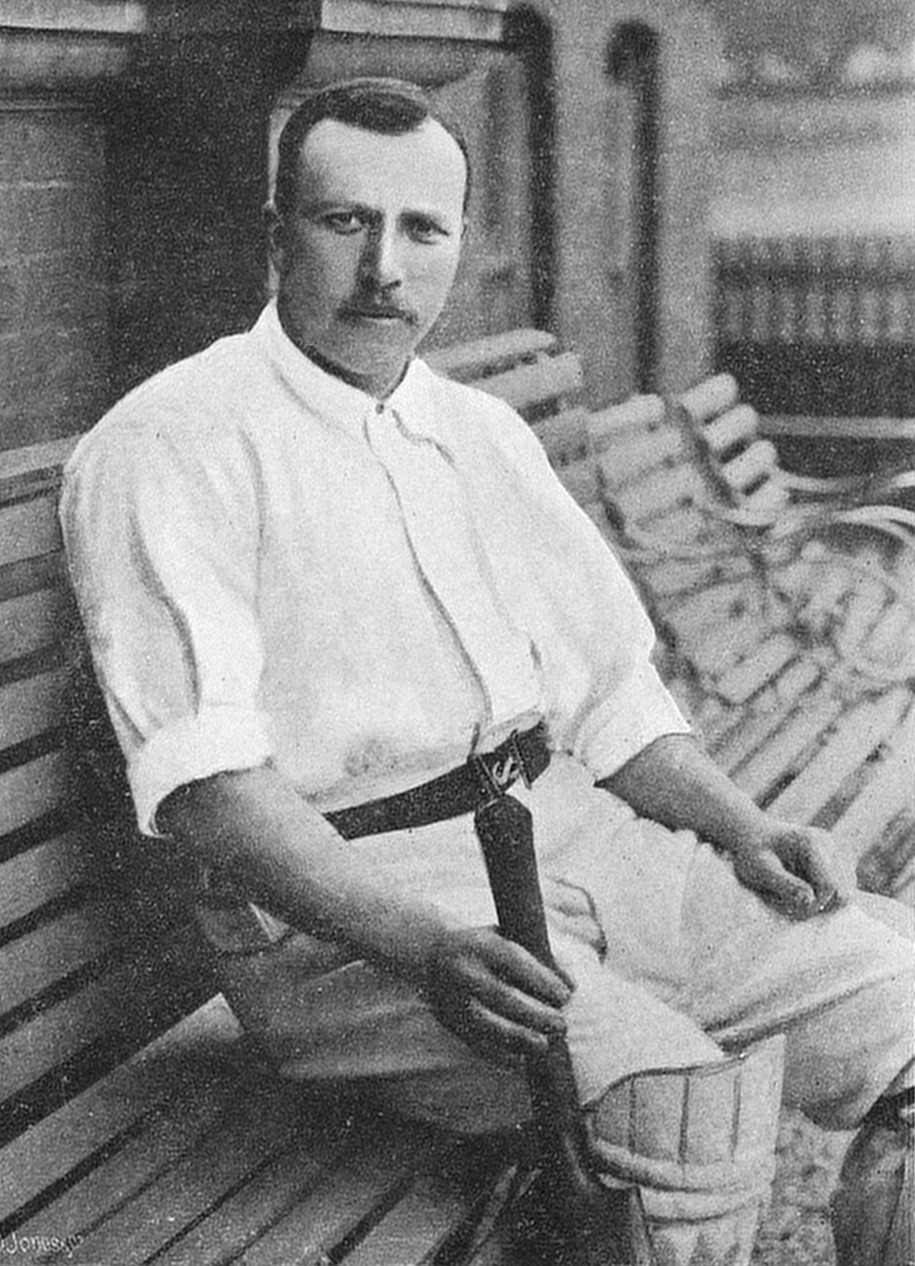
- Harry Bagshaw

Personal information
- Full name: Henry Bagshaw
- Born: 1 September 1859; Foolow, Derbyshire, England
- Died: 31 January 1927 (aged 67); Crowden, Derbyshire, England
- Batting: Left-handed
- Bowling: Right-arm medium

Domestic team information
- Years: Team
- 1887–1902: Derbyshire
- FC debut: 12 August 1887 Derbyshire v MCC
- Last FC: 14 July 1902 Derbyshire v Nottinghamshire

Career statistics
Competition	First-class
Matches	125
Runs scored	5,456
Batting average	26.10
100s/50s	7/25
Top score	127*
Balls bowled	4,206
Wickets	73
Bowling average	29.02
5 wickets in innings	2
10 wickets in match	0
Best bowling	5/18
Catches/stumpings	36/–
- Source: CricketArchive, 25 July 2010

Henry Bagshaw (1 September 1859 – 31 January 1927) was an English cricketer who played first-class cricket for Derbyshire between 1887 and 1902 and was also a cricket umpire.

== Biography ==
Bagshaw was born at Foolow, Derbyshire, where he became a lead miner. He played for the Derbyshire Colts' team in 1880. His first-class career with Derbyshire began in the 1887 season when, as a 28-year-old, he played against Marylebone Cricket Club.

Derbyshire lost first-class status in the 1888 season, but Bagshaw continued to take part in matches between future first-class sides and Derbyshire and was top scorer for the club in the 1892 and 1893 seasons. Derbyshire's matches were accorded first-class status again in the 1894 season. Bagshaw took part in his first County Championship match when Derbyshire joined the Championship in the 1895 season.

He played consistently during the season, and had a top score of 127 not out against Yorkshire, the highest of his career. During his time at Derbyshire he was an opening or number 3 batsman. In the 1896 season he scored 115 against Yorkshire and 121 against Leicestershire. He scored three centuries in 1897: 124 against Leicestershire, 114 not out against Surrey and 105 against Hampshire. In the 1898 season he scored 100 not out against Yorkshire.

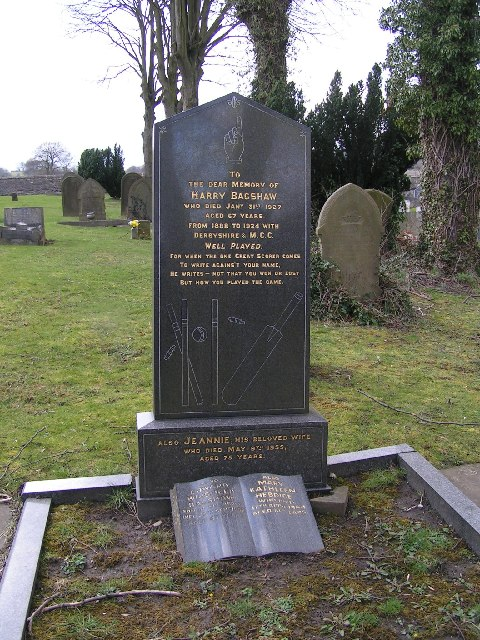
Bagshaw's distinctive headstone

In the 1899 season, Bagshaw's bowling came to the fore when he took 5 for 18 against Nottinghamshire. In the 1900 season he took 34 wickets and against Hampshire bowled 5 for 27.

Bagshaw was a left-handed batsman and played 218 innings in 125 first-class matches with an average of 26.10 and a top score of 127 not out. He scored 7 centuries in making over 5000 runs. He was a right-arm medium-pace bowler and took 73 first-class wickets at an average of 29.02 and a best performance of 5 for 18.

Between 1907 and 1923 he was a first-class umpire in England, taking charge of over 200 matches.

Bagshaw died at Crowden, near Glossop, and was buried at St Lawrence's Church, Eyam. His tall headstone has at the apex a hand with a finger pointing upwards. Underneath the lettering is a set of stumps, with the bails flying off and a bat which has just hit the wicket.
