= George Glossop Walker =

English cricketer

George Walker
Personal information
- Full name: George Glossop Walker
- Born: 14 June 1860; Harthill Grange, Yorkshire, England
- Died: 11 January 1908 (aged 47); Whitwell, England
- Batting: Left-handed
- Bowling: Left-arm

Domestic team information
- Years: Team
- 1881–1898: Derbyshire
- FC debut: 1 August 1881 Derbyshire v Yorkshire
- Last FC: 25 August 1898 Derbyshire v Lancashire

Career statistics
Competition	First-class
Matches	75
Runs scored	1,141
Batting average	10.97
100s/50s	0/1
Top score	66
Balls bowled	10,312
Wickets	202
Bowling average	25.06
5 wickets in innings	10
10 wickets in match	3
Best bowling	9/68
Catches/stumpings	26/–
- Source: CricketArchive, 18 July 2010

George Glossop Walker (1860–1908) was an English cricketer who played for Derbyshire between 1881 and 1898.

== Early life ==
Walker was born 14 June 1860 at Harthill Grange, Yorkshire, the son of George Walker a farmer. His father maintained a diary, which noted after his fifth birthday, "Mr Hudson sent Georgy a cricket bat and stumps". Walker then went to school, boarding at Whitwell and later was at Broomback House School, Sheffield. He took every opportunity to watch W. G. Grace play against Yorkshire. By 14, he was playing cricket for Whitwell and by 1880 he had a batting average of 27 and a bowling average of just 4. He was also winning prizes as a sprinter.

Walker had a county trial for Derbyshire at Chesterfield when he was 18, but he did not play for the side then. He played for the Gentlemen of Sheffield in 1879, but his first appearance in first-class cricket for Derbyshire was not until 1881. At that time, he was at living with his parents at the Manor House, Whitwell, Derbyshire where his father farmed 415 acres (1.68 km^{2}), and he became a farmer himself. He was made a vice-president of Whitwell Cricket Club in 1881. 'G G' Walker with James Stubbings and Samuel Malthouse performed notably for the club in the 1880s and all three also played for Welbeck.

== Derbyshire cricketer ==
Walker's debut match for Derbyshire in the 1881 season was against Yorkshire when he never had the chance to bowl and scored 2 runs in each innings. He did not play again in that season nor in the 1882 season, and only played in two games in the 1883 season. In the 1884 and 1885 season, when William Cropper lead the bowling, he played more frequently and in 1885 took 7–105 against Nottinghamshire in one match and 5–87 in the other. In 1886 Walker was selected for two Gentlemen of England teams, in one of which against Australia he was in the team with his hero W.G. Grace. For the county he took 6–26 against Marylebone Cricket Club (MCC), and 7–38 and 5–75 in the same match against Surrey. In the 1887 season Walker took 5–54 for Derbyshire against Lancashire and 5–49 against Surrey. He continued playing regularly for the Derbyshire club between 1888 and 1893 when it was without first-class status. In 1894 took 7–108 for Gentlemen against Players with W. G. Grace in the side again although he never had the opportunity to bowl against him in any of his first-class games. He also took 5–24 for Derbyshire against Lancashire. In the 1896 season he took 9–85 against Leicestershire although his average was deteriorating. He played four games in the 1897 season and six in the 1898 season by which time his bowling made little impression, while Billy Bestwick was beginning to star.

Walker was a left-arm bowler and took 202 first-class wickets at an average of 25.06 and a best performance of 9–68. He was a left-hand batsman and played 128 innings in 75 first-class matches with a top score of 66 and an average of 10.97.

== Later life ==
Walker was a leading member of the Whitwell community and his home and fields were used for local flower shows and other celebrations. He was an Overseer and a Guardian of the Poor. He died 11 January 1908 in Whitwell at the age of 48.
