= James Stubbings =

English cricketer

Personal information
- Born: 27 April 1856; Whitwell, Derbyshire, England
- Died: 17 July 1912 (aged 56); Huddersfield, England
- Batting: Right-handed
- Bowling: Right-arm fast
- Relatives: Walter Stubbings (brother)

Domestic team information
- Years: Team
- 1880–1885: Derbyshire
- FC debut: 6 September 1877 Players of the North v Gentlemen of the North
- Last FC: 4 June 1885 Derbyshire v Lancashire

Career statistics
| Competition | First-class |
|---|---|
| Matches | 5 |
| Runs scored | 26 |
| Batting average | 3.71 |
| 100s/50s | 0/0 |
| Top score | 10* |
| Balls bowled | 225 |
| Wickets | 7 |
| Bowling average | 20.28 |
| 5 wickets in innings | 1 |
| 10 wickets in match | 0 |
| Best bowling | 5/51 |
| Catches/stumpings | 1/– |
- Source: CricketArchive, 2 February 2011

James Stubbings (27 April 1856 – 17 July 1912) was an English cricketer who played first-class cricket for Derbyshire between 1880 and 1885.

== Life ==
Stubbings was born in Whitwell, Derbyshire, the son of James Stubbings, a mason, and his wife Ann. Stubbings himself became a stonemason. He was a notable performer for Whitwell Cricket Club in the 1880s with Samuel Malthouse and 'G G' Walker and all three also played for Welbeck as well as the county.

Stubbings played for Players of the North in 1877, in a scratch team for Yorkshire against the Australians in 1878 and for Derbyshire against Harrow Wanderers in the 1879 season. His debut first-class appearance for the Derbyshire side was in the 1880 season against the touring Australians, and in the same year he played county matches against Yorkshire and Lancashire taking 5–51 in the second innings. His next Derbyshire game was in the 1885 season against Lancashire. He later played matches for Derbyshire in 1892 and 1893 when Derbyshire was without first-class status.

Stubbings was a right-handed batsman and played 10 innings in 5 first-class matches with a top score of 10 and an average of 3.71. He was a right-handed fast bowler and took 7 first-class wickets with an average of 20.28 and a best performance of 5–51.

Stubbings died in Huddersfield at the age of 56.

Stubbings' brother, Walter, fourteen years his junior, played one first-class match for Derbyshire.
