= Charles Evans (cricketer, born 1866) =

English cricketer

Personal information
- Full name: Charles Evans
- Born: 19 February 1866; Newbold, Derbyshire, England
- Died: 12 January 1956 (aged 89); Chesterfield, England
- Batting: Right-handed
- Bowling: Right-arm medium-fast

Domestic team information
- Years: Team
- 1889–1895: Derbyshire
- FC debut: 11 June 1894 Derbyshire v Lancashire
- Last FC: 8 July 1895 Derbyshire v Yorkshire

Career statistics
Competition	First-class
Matches	9
Runs scored	157
Batting average	13.08
100s/50s	0/0
Top score	31
Balls bowled	1,048
Wickets	19
Bowling average	27.68
5 wickets in innings	0
10 wickets in match	0
Best bowling	4/46
Catches/stumpings	7/–
- Source: CricketArchive, February 2012

Charles Evans (19 February 1866 — 14 January 1956) was an English cricketer who played for Derbyshire between 1889 and 1895.

Evans was born at Newbold, Derbyshire, the son of George Evans, an engine wright at a colliery, and his wife Harriett. In 1881, Evans was an engine driver at the colliery at the age of 15.

Evans' first match for Derbyshire was in the 1889 season in the period when Derbyshire's matches were not accorded first-class status, and he played six games at intervals in the period taking 13 wickets at just over 18 runs each. Evans made his first-class debut in the 1894 season in June against Lancashire and his best bowling figures were 4 for 46 against Warwickshire in the same year. He played three games in the County Championship in the 1895 season averaging two wickets a match but at a high cost.

Evans was a right-handed batsman and played 14 innings in 9 matches with a top score of 31 and an average of 13.08. He was a right-arm medium-fast bowler taking 19 wickets at an average of 27.68.

Evans died in Chesterfield at the age of 89.
