= Matthew Walton (cricketer) =

English cricketer

Matthew Walton (10 December 1837 – 7 January 1888) was an English cricketer who played for Lancashire. He was born and died in Glossop.

Walton was a member of Glossop Cricket Club, who made his only first-class appearance during September 1867. Walton's son, William played one first-class game for Derbyshire in 1887.
