= William Cropper =

English sportsman

Personal information
- Born: 27 December 1862; Brimington, Derbyshire, England
- Died: 13 January 1889 (aged 26); Grimsby, England
- Batting: Right-handed
- Bowling: Left-arm medium

Domestic team information
- Years: Team
- 1882–1888: Derbyshire
- FC debut: 1 June 1882 Derbyshire v Yorkshire
- Last FC: 23 August 1888 England XI v Australians

Career statistics
Competition	First-class
Matches	60
Runs scored	1,636
Batting average	15.00
100s/50s	0/3
Top score	93
Balls bowled	7,677
Wickets	171
Bowling average	17.13
5 wickets in innings	8
10 wickets in match	0
Best bowling	7/25
Catches/stumpings	26/–
- Source: CricketArchive, 21 July 2010

William Cropper (27 December 1862 – 13 January 1889) was an English cricketer and footballer who played cricket for Derbyshire County Cricket Club between 1882 and 1888 and football, as a centre forward, once for Derby County. He was one of nineteen sportsmen to achieve the Derbyshire Double of playing cricket for Derbyshire and football for Derby County. He died aged 26 following an on-field injury while playing football for Staveley.

Cropper was born at Brimington, Derbyshire, the son of Thomas and Mary Cropper, and was a bricklayer. He made his debut for Derbyshire in the 1882 season. He also played for the North of England team. He shared most wickets for the club in the 1883, 1884, 1885 and 1886 seasons. In 1886, he played one football match for Derby County. Derbyshire lost first-class status for the 1888 season but Cropper continued playing for the side. Cropper played 113 innings in 60 first-class matches to score 1638 runs with an average of 15.00 and a top score of 93 not out. He took 171 first-class wickets, with an average of 17.13 and a best performance of 7 for 25.

From 1888, Cropper played football for the Derbyshire side of Staveley. While playing for Staveley, on 12 January 1889 against Grimsby Town at Clee Park, Lincolnshire, Cropper collided with Dan Doyle, the Grimsby rightback, after fifteen minutes. He was badly injured by Doyle's knee in his abdomen and left the field in obvious distress. The collision resulted in a ruptured bowel and he died in the dressing room at Grimsby in the arms of his Staveley and Derbyshire County Cricket Club teammate George Hay.

Cropper was buried in Brimington churchyard and a memorial stone was erected – from the proceeds of a subscription fund raised by his family and friends – which can still be seen today.
