= Samuel Malthouse =

English cricketer (1857–1931)

Personal information
- Born: 13 October 1857; Whitwell, Derbyshire, England
- Died: 7 February 1931 (aged 73); Whitwell, Derbyshire, England
- Batting: Left-handed
- Bowling: Right-arm medium; Right-arm off spin

Domestic team information
- Years: Team
- 1890–1895: Derbyshire
- FC debut: 11 June 1894 Derbyshire v Lancashire
- Last FC: 13 May 1895 Derbyshire v Warwickshire

Career statistics
Competition	First-class
Matches	9
Runs scored	118
Batting average	11.80
100s/50s	0/0
Top score	38
Balls bowled	195
Wickets	0
Bowling average	–
5 wickets in innings	–
10 wickets in match	–
Best bowling	–
Catches/stumpings	3/–
- Source: ESPNcricinfo, 11 September 2024

Samuel Malthouse (13 October 1857 – 7 February 1931) was an English cricketer who played for Derbyshire between 1890 and 1895.

Malthouse was born in Whitwell, Derbyshire, the son of John G. Malthouse, a mason, and his wife Ann. Malthouse himself became a mason, He was a notable performer for Whitwell Cricket Club in the 1880s with James Stubbings and 'G G' Walker and all three also played for Welbeck as well as the county.

Malthouse debuted for Derbyshire in the 1890 season, when the club was without first-class status and he was fourth highest scorer and achieved a five wicket innings in 1890. He played regularly for the next three years. He played eight first-class matches during the 1894 season, starting with a match against Lancashire. After Derbyshire joined the County Championship in the 1895 season, he played one match - a draw against Warwickshire. Malthouse was a left-handed batsman and a right-arm medium-pace and occasional off-spin bowler. He was a lower-order batsman and a consistent and economical bowler.

Malthouse died in Whitwell aged 74.

His son, William Malthouse, played for Derbyshire between 1919 and 1920.
