= George Porter (cricketer) =

English cricketer (1861–1908)

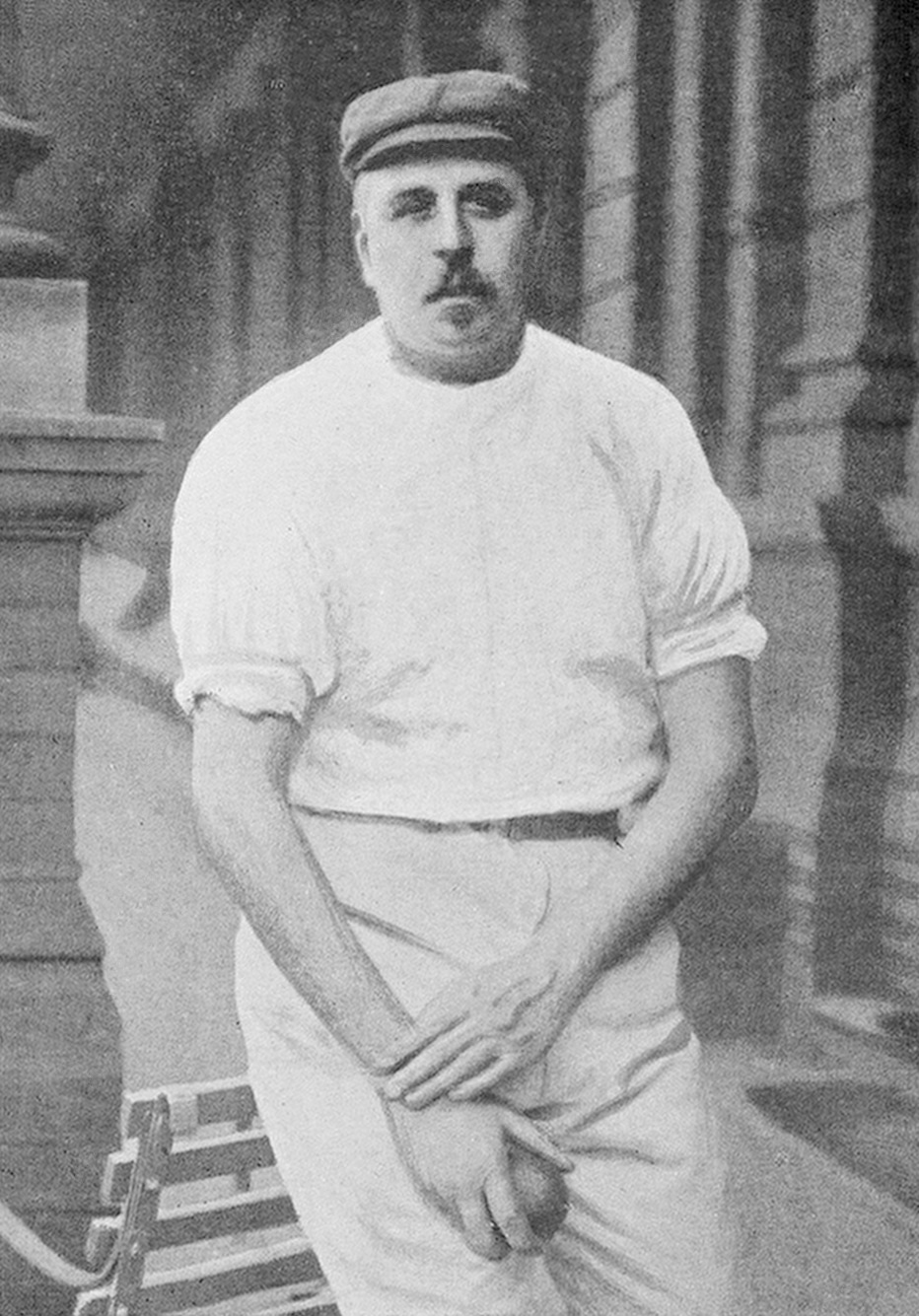
- Porter pictured in the 1890s

Personal information
- Born: 3 December 1861; Kilburn, Derbyshire, England
- Died: 15 July 1908 (aged 46); Spondon, England
- Height: 6 ft 2 in (188 cm)
- Batting: Right-handed
- Bowling: Right-arm fast-medium

Career statistics
Competition	First-class
Matches	37
Runs scored	386
Batting average	9.41
100s/50s	0/2
Top score	93
Balls bowled	7,245
Wickets	130
Bowling average	21.50
5 wickets in innings	8
10 wickets in match	1
Best bowling	7/49
Catches/stumpings	26/–
- Source: CricketArchive, 7 November 2010

George Porter (3 December 1861 – 15 July 1908) was an English cricketer who played first-class cricket for Derbyshire between 1881 and 1896.

Porter was born at Kilburn, Derbyshire, the son of John Porter a brickyard worker, and his wife Sarah Brentnall and was apprenticed to his uncle as a chimney sweep. He spent his winters as a sweep, but being a capable cricketer spent the summers as a professional cricketer. His first recorded cricket match was with the Northwood Club, West Cowes, Isle of Wight in 1880.

In 1881 Porter was living at Chapel Street, Spondon, Derbyshire and was with the South Derbyshire Club. Also in the 1881 season he played one match for Derbyshire against Lancashire in which he took a wicket in the first innings, but did not play for the club again until the 1888 season. In the interim he played for Birkenhead Park in 1882, for Wigan in 1883 and 1884, for Lowerhouse in 1885, for Grimsby in 1886 and for Longsight, Manchester from 1887 to 1889. In 1888 he played three games for Derbyshire who were by then outside the County Championship, and one game in the 1889 season. From the 1890 season he played regularly for Derbyshire and from 1890 to 1892 for Broughton, Salford.

In the 1894 season, Derbyshire matches again qualified as first-class, and Porter took 5–14 against Leicestershire. In the 1895 season the club competed in the County Championship and Porter had six 5 wicket innings. Against Hampshire he achieved 7–52 in the first innings and 7–49 in the second inning in an innings victory. He took 5–67 against Leicestershire, 5–80 against Essex, 5–55 against Lancashire and 5–67 against Surrey. He also achieved a top score of 93 against Nottinghamshire after being moved up the batting order in a follow-on for a drawn match. Derbyshire ended the season fifth in the points table. In the 1896 season Porter took 5–50 against MCC, but during the season he had to undergo surgery after straining himself, bringing his first-class career to an end.

Porter was a right-arm fast-medium bowler and took 130 first-class wickets at an average of 21.50 and a best performance of 7 for 49. He was a right-hand batsman and played 56 innings in 37 first-class matches with a top score of 93 and an average of 9.41.

Porter played for Lowerhouse again in 1897. He was then an umpire in first-class matches between 1899 and 1903.

Porter died at Spondon, Derbyshire at the age of 45.

Porter married Elizabeth Ann Mayne who was born at West Cowes, Isle of Wight in 1880.
