= James Disney =

English cricketer (1859–1934)

Personal information
- Full name: James Joseph Disney
- Born: 20 November 1859; Butterley, Derbyshire, England
- Died: 24 June 1934 (aged 74); Ripley, Derbyshire, England
- Batting: Right-handed
- Role: Wicket-Keeper

Domestic team information
- Years: Team
- 1881–1890: Derbyshire
- FC debut: 23 May 1881 Derbyshire v Sussex
- Last FC: 21 June 1894 Liverpool and District v Yorkshire

Career statistics
Competition	First-class
Matches	57
Runs scored	377
Batting average	5.30
100s/50s	0/0
Top score	27*
Catches/stumpings	97/12
- Source: CricketArchive, 4 May 2010

James Joseph Disney (20 November 1859 – 24 June 1934) was an English cricketer who played first-class cricket for Derbyshire as wicket-keeper between 1881 and 1890.

Disney was born in Butterley near Ripley, Derbyshire and became a plumber as his main career. He played for twenty-three Colts of England against the MCC in 1881 and in that year made his debut for Derbyshire in a victory against Sussex setting his place as wicket keeper for the club.

In the 1882 season, he continued to keep wicket, although as a batsman he found himself getting out cheaply. Derbyshire played host to the touring Australians, and Disney found himself out to the bowling of Eugene Palmer on two occasions. He played a full season in 1883 but in 1884 Disney took a year out of the side, when Thomas Mycroft filled the wicket-keeping slot. He returned in 1885, when he was once again a first-team pick. Disney remained a force as a wicket-keeper and continued playing for Derbyshire until 1890, although the club lost first-class status in 1887. In 1888 he was called in as wicket keeper for an England XI in a match against a team of Australians building up to the third match of a Test series. He played his last season for Derbyshire in 1890 to be replaced by William Storer. In 1893 he started playing for Cheshire where he stayed until 1901. He played a final first-class game was for Liverpool & District in 1894.

Disney kept wicket in 57 first-class matches taking 87 catches and stumping twelve times. He was a right-handed batsman and played 101 first-class innings with an average of 5.30 and a top score of 27 not out.

Disney died in Ripley aged 74.
