= George Davidson (cricketer) =

English cricketer (1866–1899)

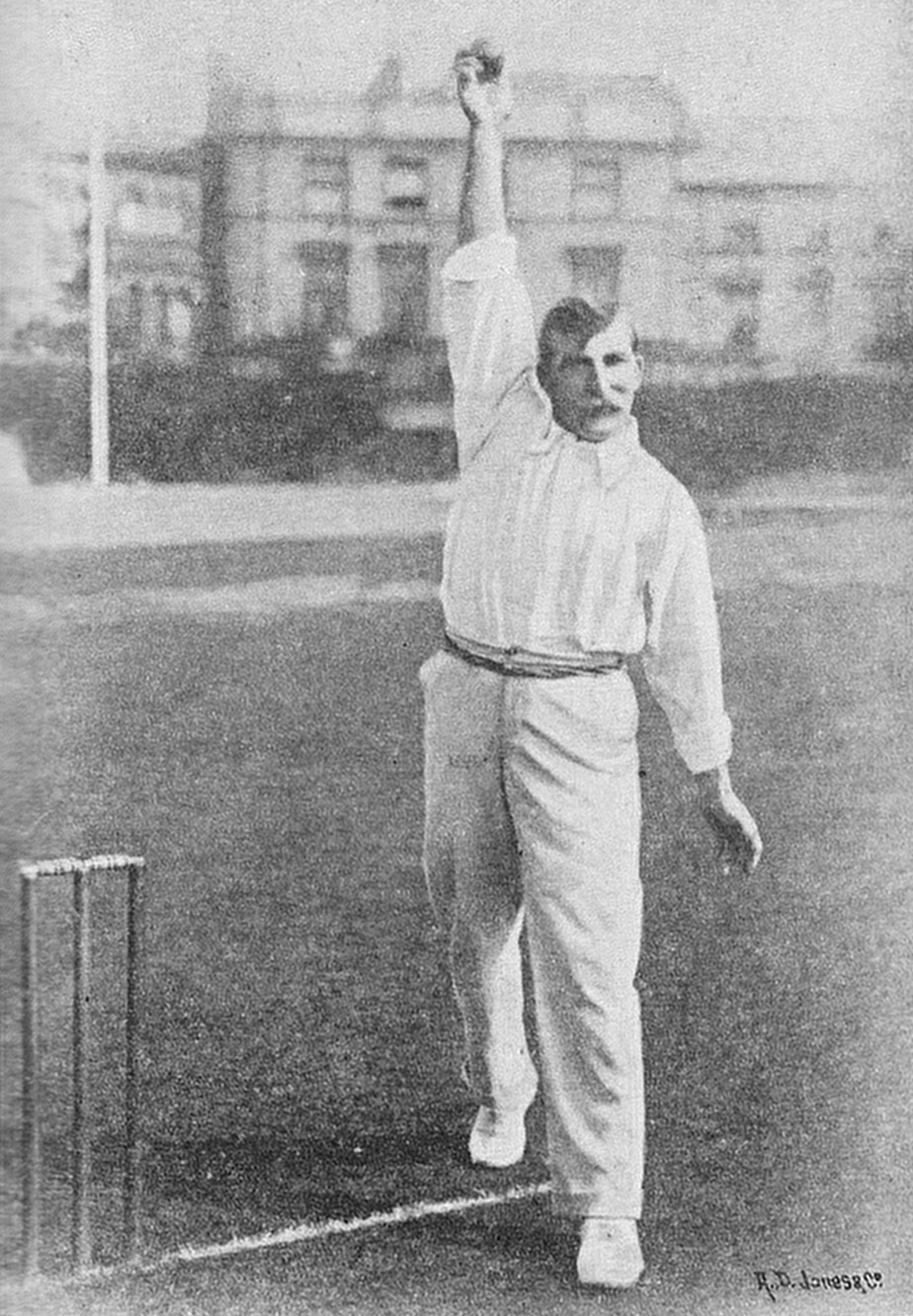

Personal information
- Full name: George Arthur Davidson
- Born: 29 June 1866; Brimington, Derbyshire, England
- Died: 8 February 1899 (aged 32); Tividale, England
- Batting: Right-handed
- Bowling: Right-arm medium-fast

Domestic team information
- Years: Team
- 1886–1898: Derbyshire
- 1888–1898: MCC
- FC debut: 13 May 1886 Derbyshire v MCC
- Last FC: 25 August 1898 Derbyshire v Lancashire

Career statistics
Competition	First-class
Matches	158
Runs scored	5,546
Batting average	23.80
100s/50s	3/28
Top score	274
Balls bowled	33,441
Wickets	621
Bowling average	18.26
5 wickets in innings	43
10 wickets in match	10
Best bowling	9/39
Catches/stumpings	135/–
- Source: CricketArchive, 11 July 2010

George Arthur Davidson (29 June 1866 – 8 February 1899) was an English first-class cricketer who played for Derbyshire between 1886 and 1898 and for Marylebone Cricket Club between 1888 and 1898. A useful all-rounder, he scored over 5500 runs and took 621 wickets in his first-class career.

Davidson was born in Brimington, Derbyshire, the son of Josh Davidson, a coal miner, and his wife, Elizabeth. His father played one game annually for Derbyshire from 1871 to 1875.

Davidson's first-class career began for Derbyshire in the 1886 season playing in the first match of the season against Marylebone Cricket Club, a game where he played in the lower order. He played regularly for the rest of the season. In the 1887 season he topped the batting and bowling figures for the club, scoring the first two half-centuries of his career and taking three five wicket overs. Derbyshire lost first-class status in 1888 and Davidson's few first-class appearances in the subsequent six years were mainly for Marylebone Cricket Club (MCC). He scored two further half-centuries, once in 1890 and once in 1892. He continued to carry his colours for Derbyshire being top wicket-taker every season between 1889 and 1893.

In the 1894 season Davidson played in nineteen first-class games for the re-promoted Derbyshire side although they did not play in the County Championship until the following season. In the season he achieved ten 5 wicket innings and three 10-wicket games. In the 1895 season Derbyshire finished fifth, and Davidson achieved career-best single-innings bowling figures of 9–39, against a strong Warwickshire batting side on a pitch better than most of the period. Davidson in 1895 achieved nine 5-wicket innings and three 10-wicket games and became the first English cricketer since W.G. Grace in 1886 to achieve the double of 1,000 runs and 100 wickets. He played for the Players at Lord's though without success even on a fiery pitch against some brilliant amateur batting. But for the special portrait of Grace, George Davidson might have been a Cricketer of the Year in the 1896 Wisden.

In the 1896 season, Davidson made his highest first-class score of 274 against Lancs. This innings was over 150 runs greater than any other tally he recorded during his first-class career, and remains as of 2013 Derbyshire's best single innings from an individual batsman in first-class cricket. Chesney Hughes narrowly missed the record in April 2013 with an unbeaten 270 as he carried his bat against Yorkshire at Headingley. In the same year he also managed five 5-wicket innings and Derbyshire came seventh in the Championship table. In the 1897 season he scored 121 against Notts and took four 5-wicket innings. In the 1898 season he took 15–116 in a match against Essex, the fourth-best bowling analysis in a match for Derbyshire, though Essex won easily on a fiery pitch. He took seven other 5-wicket innings and scored 108 against Hants. Derbyshire finished joint-ninth in the 1898 season, debuting Billy Bestwick.

Davidson was a right-handed batsman and played 260 innings in 158 first-class matches, He made 5546 runs with an average of 23.80 and a top score of 274. He was a right-arm medium-fast bowler and took 621 first-class wickets at an average of 18.26. He had ten 10-wicket matches and 43 5-wicket innings with a best performance of 9 for 39.

However 1898, a season in which his bowling average had been even better than in 1895, was to be his final season and, although it was naturally assumed that he would continue to play for many more years, Davidson contracted influenza and then pneumonia from which he died in Tividale.

As well as his father, his brother Frank also played for Derbyshire during the 1890s.
