= William Chatterton =

English cricketer and footballer

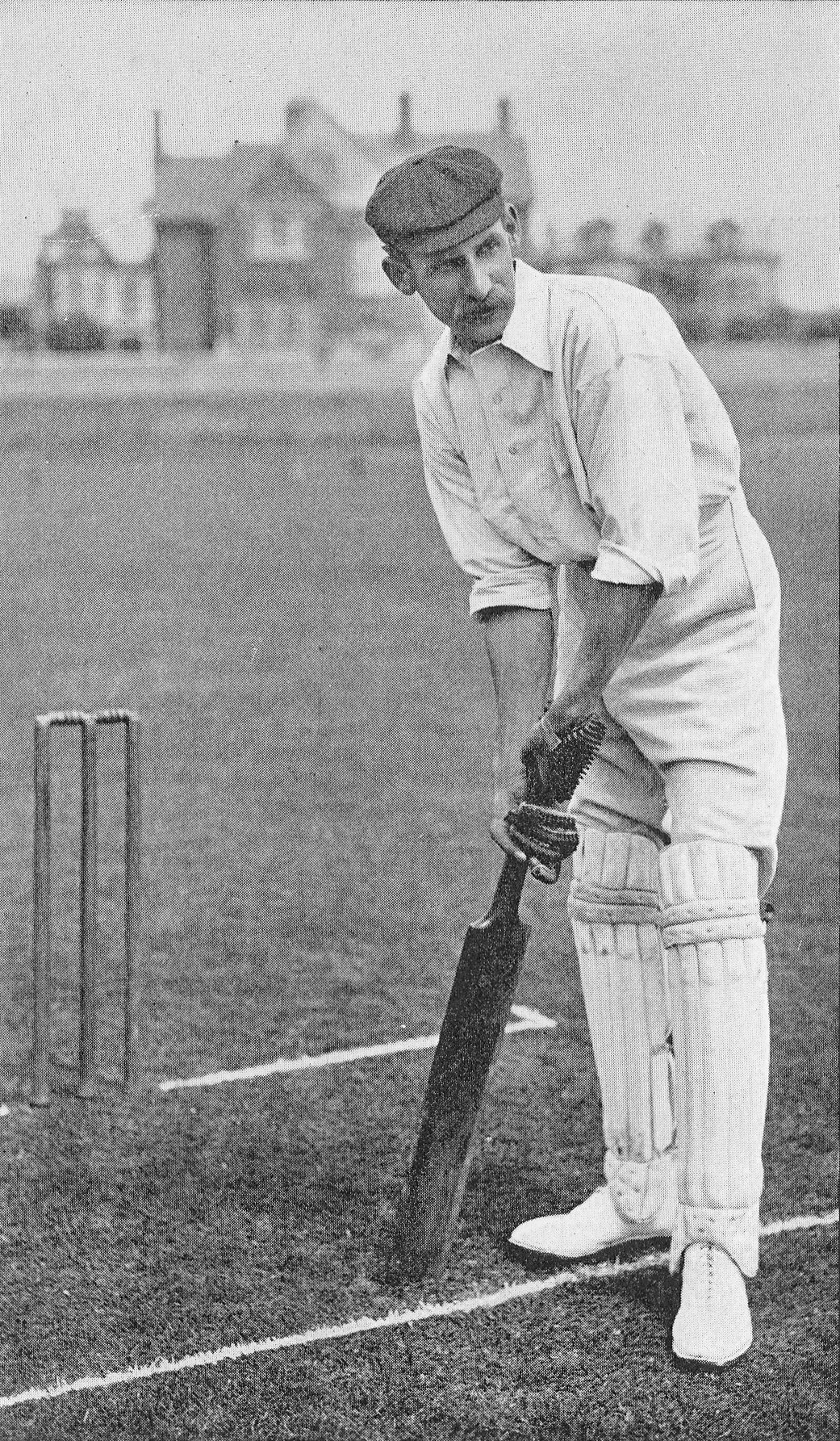

Personal information
- Full name: William Chatterton
- Born: 27 December 1861; Thornsett, Derbyshire
- Died: 19 March 1913 (aged 51); Hyde, Cheshire
- Batting: Right-handed
- Bowling: Right-arm slow
- Relatives: Joseph Chatterton (brother)

International information
- National side: England
- Only Test (cap 74): 19 March 1892 v South Africa

Domestic team information
- Years: Team
- 1882–1902: Derbyshire

Career statistics
Competition	Test	First-class
Matches	1	289
Runs scored	48	10,914
Batting average	48.00	23.17
100s/50s	0/0	8/53
Top score	48	169
Balls bowled	0	11,896
Wickets	–	208
Bowling average	–	21.46
5 wickets in innings	–	4
10 wickets in match	–	1
Best bowling	–	6/42
Catches/stumpings	0/–	239/4
- Source: Cricinfo, 31 January 2010

William Chatterton (27 December 1861 – 19 March 1913) was an English cricketer and footballer. He played first-class cricket for Derbyshire between 1882 and 1902 and for England on their tour of South Africa in 1891–92. He captained Derbyshire between 1887 and 1889 and scored over 10,000 runs in his first-class career as well as taking over 200 wickets. He played football for Derby County, being one of 19 sportsmen to achieve the Derbyshire Double of playing cricket for Derbyshire and football for Derby County.

== Life ==
Chatterton was born at Thornsett, Birch Vale, Derbyshire, the son of David Chatterton, a cotton mill fireman, and his wife Hannah. In 1881 he was a cotton carrier in the mills at Newton Cheshire.

== Cricket career ==
Chatterton started playing cricket for Derbyshire in the 1882 season and football for Derby County in 1884.

Chatterton was captain of Derbyshire cricket from 1887 to 1889. The club was demoted from first-class status before the 1888 season.

In 1891–92 Chatterton toured South Africa with W. W. Read's English team. It was a winter in which two England sides toured (the other one to Australia), but later the representative games on each tour were raised to Test match status, which meant that Chatterton played one Test match. He was the team's outstanding batsman on the tour, scoring 955 runs in all matches at an average of 41.52.

Chatterton was considered to be almost single-handedly responsible for Derbyshire regaining first-class status in the 1894 season. He finished his cricketing career for Derbyshire in the 1902 season.

== Football career ==
Chatterton was an inside–forward and played in Derby County's first FA Cup tie against Walsall Town on 8 November 1884, which Derby County lost 7–0. He played many games for the club before the Football League was formed in 1888. He then made five League appearances for Derby County in the first Football League season of 1888–89.

William Chatterton, playing as an inside–forward, made his League debut on 13 October 1888 at Thorneyholme Road, the home of Accrington. The home team won 6–2. Chatterton, on his League debut supplanted Levi Wright as Derby County' oldest League player. Chatterton scored his debut and only League goal at County Ground, the then home of Derby County, on 20 October 1888. Chatterton scored, with his head, to reduce Everton's half–time lead to 2–1. Derby County lost the match 4–2. Chatterton was 26 years 298 days old when scoring his debut League goal which made him, on that seventh week of League football, Derby County's oldest player. Chatterton appeared in five of the 22 League matches played by Derby County in season 1888–89 scoring one League goal.

Chatterton was not retained at the end of the 1888–89 season and did not play League football again.

== Death ==
Chatterton died of tuberculosis at Flowery Field, Hyde, Cheshire, in 1913.

== See also ==
- List of English cricket and football players

Sporting positions
Preceded by Edmund Maynard	Derbyshire cricket captains 1887–1889	Succeeded by Fred Spofforth
