= John Hulme (Derbyshire cricketer) =

English cricketer

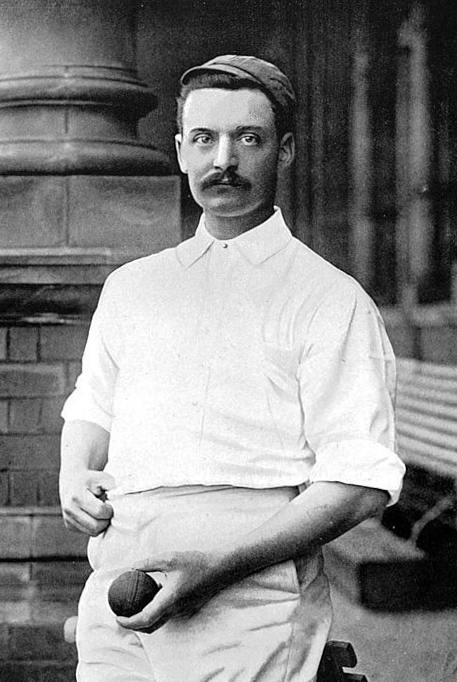

Personal information
- Full name: John Joseph Hulme
- Born: 30 June 1862; Church Gresley, Derbyshire, England
- Died: 11 July 1940 (aged 78); Nelson, Lancashire, England
- Batting: Left-handed
- Bowling: Left-arm medium-fast

Domestic team information
- Years: Team
- 1887–1903: Derbyshire
- FC debut: 12 May 1887 Derbyshire v MCC
- Last FC: 17 August 1905 Derbyshire v Warwickshire

Career statistics
Competition	First-class
Matches	142
Runs scored	2,433
Batting average	12.35
100s/50s	0/5
Top score	59
Balls bowled	32,174
Wickets	557
Bowling average	23.99
5 wickets in innings	34
10 wickets in match	9
Best bowling	9/27
Catches/stumpings	80/–
- Source: CricketArchive, 23 July 2010

John Joseph Hulme (30 June 1862 – 11 July 1940) was an English cricketer who played for Derbyshire County Cricket Club between 1887 and 1903.

Hulme was born in Church Gresley, Swadlincote, Derbyshire. He debuted for Derbyshire in the 1887 season against Marylebone Cricket Club in May, and took two wickets in the second innings. He played six more county matches in the season, but Derbyshire lost first-class status that year. In 1888 with several Derbyshire players he played for an England XI against the Australians and took 7–14. He also took the most wickets for Derbyshire in the 1888 season including 15 wickets in one game against Yorkshire. In 1889 he played several matches for Marylebone Cricket Club. He played consistently and regularly for Derbyshire until it rejoined the championship in the 1895 season.

In the 1894 season there was a series of first-class friendly matches and during this time Hulme took 9 wickets for 27 against Yorkshire and achieved 3 other five wicket hauls. He twice took 10 wickets in a match and hit his first half-century against Nottinghamshire. He played regularly in the County Championship in 1896 and from 1899 until 1903, but lost the best part of three seasons to illness. In the 1896 season he took 7 for 44 against Warwickshire with five other 5 wicket innings and four 10 wicket matches. Derbyshire were seventh that year. He did not play for the club in the 1897 season due to illness and after two excellent matches in early 1898 his illness recurred. However, in the 1899 season, he had eight 5 wicket innings with one ten wicket match, and reached his top score of 59 against Warwickshire, but the team went down to 15th place. In the 1900 and 1901 seasons he had three 5 wicket inning each year but the club stayed low in the table. In the 1902 season he took 7 for 48 against Hampshire and another three five wicket innings and the club was up to 10th. In the 1903 season he took 8 for 52 against Lancashire and another three five wicket innings and the club ended 12th. He did not play for the side after that.

Hulme was a left-arm medium-fast bowler and took 557 first-class wickets at an average of 23.99 and a best performance of 9–27. He took 5 or more wickets in an innings on 34 occasions, and there were 9 matches when he took 10 or more wickets. He was a left-handed batsman and played 229 innings in 142 games with a top score of 59 and an average of 12.35.

Hulme died in Nelson, Lancashire at the age of 78.
