= Walter Hall (cricketer) =

English cricketer

Personal information
- Born: 27 November 1861; Whitfield, Derbyshire, England
- Died: 19 November 1924 (aged 62); Pitsmoor, Sheffield, England
- Batting: Right-handed
- Bowling: Right-arm medium

Domestic team information
- Years: Team
- 1882–1892: Derbyshire
- FC debut: 1 June 1882 Derbyshire v Yorkshire
- Last FC: 17 June 1886 Derbyshire v Yorkshire

Career statistics
Competition	First-class
Matches	11
Runs scored	146
Batting average	11.23
100s/50s	0/0
Top score	43
Balls bowled	705
Wickets	14
Bowling average	26.85
5 wickets in innings	1
10 wickets in match	0
Best bowling	6/47
Catches/stumpings	9/–
- Source: CricketArchive, 22 June 2011

Walter Hall (27 November 1861 – 19 November 1924) was an English first-class cricketer who played for Derbyshire from 1882 to 1892

Hall was born at Whitfield, Derbyshire. In 1881 he was working at a print works at Glossop. Hall made his first-class debut for Derbyshire in the 1882 season against Yorkshire in June when he took a wicket and a couple of catches, but failed to strike highly as an opener. He played one more match for the club that season as a tail-ender. Hall next played first-class in the 1885 season when he played five matches and achieved a best bowling performance of 6 for 43 against Lancashire. He played two matches in the 1886 season. Hall was a right-hand batsman and played 17 innings in 11 first-class matches with an average of 11.23 and a top score of 43. He was a right-arm medium pace bowler and took 14 first-class wickets at an average of 26.85 and a best performance of 6 for 47.

With Derbyshire out of the championship in 1888, Hall continued to play regularly for the club until 1892. In 1893 he played for Blackpool against the Australians. Nine years later in 1902 he was playing in the Lancashire League for Accrington.

Hall died at Pitsmoor, Sheffield, Yorkshire at the age of 62.
