= Walter Sugg =

English cricketer

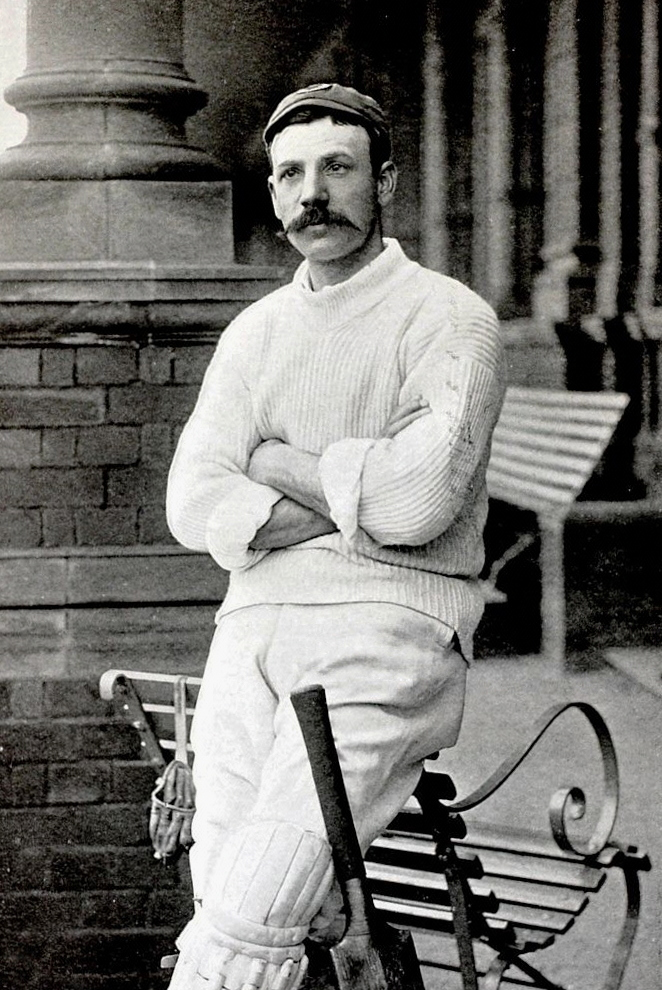
- Sugg in the 1890s

Personal information
- Born: 21 May 1860; Ilkeston, Derbyshire, England
- Died: 21 May 1933 (aged 73); Dore, Yorkshire, England
- Batting: Right-handed
- Bowling: Right-arm medium
- Relatives: Frank Sugg (brother)

Domestic team information
- Years: Team
- 1881: Yorkshire
- 1884–1902: Derbyshire
- FC debut: 13 June 1881 Yorkshire v Kent
- Last FC: 12 June 1902 Derbyshire v Worcestershire

Career statistics
Competition	First-class
Matches	129
Runs scored	3,469
Batting average	17.17
100s/50s	2/12
Top score	107
Balls bowled	2787
Wickets	50
Bowling average	31.20
5 wickets in innings	0
10 wickets in match	0
Best bowling	4/61
Catches/stumpings	64/–
- Source: CricketArchive, 30 April 2010

Walter Sugg (21 May 1860 – 21 May 1933) was an English first-class cricketer, who played for Yorkshire in 1881, and for Derbyshire from 1884 until 1902.

== Life and career ==
Sugg was born at Ilkeston, Derbyshire, England, the son of a Sheffield solicitor and was himself a solicitor's clerk. He was educated at Sheffield Grammar School. He first played for Yorkshire in 1881 against Kent when he made 9 runs in his only innings. In 1884, Sugg joined Derbyshire and went on to play 128 games for the club. He made his debut against Kent in June when he took three wickets in the second innings, took two catches in the first innings and was 26 not out in his first batting innings. He played one more match in 1884 and then played a fuller season in 1886 and 1887. Between 1888 and 1893, Derbyshire games were not first-class, but Sugg continued playing regularly. In 1894, he scored 121 in a miscellaneous match against the South Africans at the County Ground, Derby before being run out. In 1895, he scored 104 not out against Leicestershire. His benefit match, against Yorkshire at Queen's Park, Chesterfield in 1898, was renowned for the then world record first wicket partnership of Yorkshire's Brown and Tunnicliffe which eclipsed all previous records to post 554. In the 1899 season Sugg scored 107 against Worcestershire. Sugg scored 3,469 runs at 17.17 in 218 innings in 129 first-class matches. He scored two championship centuries, and took 50 wickets with his right arm medium pace at 31.20, with a best of 4 for 61 against the Australian tourists. He was a free scoring right-handed batsman and an outstanding fielder at cover-point, where he took 64 catches.

Sugg was an all-round sportsman, playing professional football, being a scratch golfer and a fine billiards player. He played as a club professional footballer at Durham City, Burnley from 1885 to 1887 and Rochdale from 1888 to 1891, and played for a number of other clubs either on a match basis or as an amateur, including Farnworth, Ormskirk and Southport.

Sugg and his brother Frank opened a sports shop at 32 Lord Street, Liverpool, with a branch at 10 North Street, Liverpool, and for twelve years from 1894 to 1905 issued Sugg's Cricket Annual.

Sugg died on his 73rd birthday in Dore, Yorkshire. His younger brother Frank played first-class cricket for Yorkshire, Derbyshire, Lancashire and England. The two brothers died within eight days of each other.
