= Bill Storer =

English cricketer and footballer

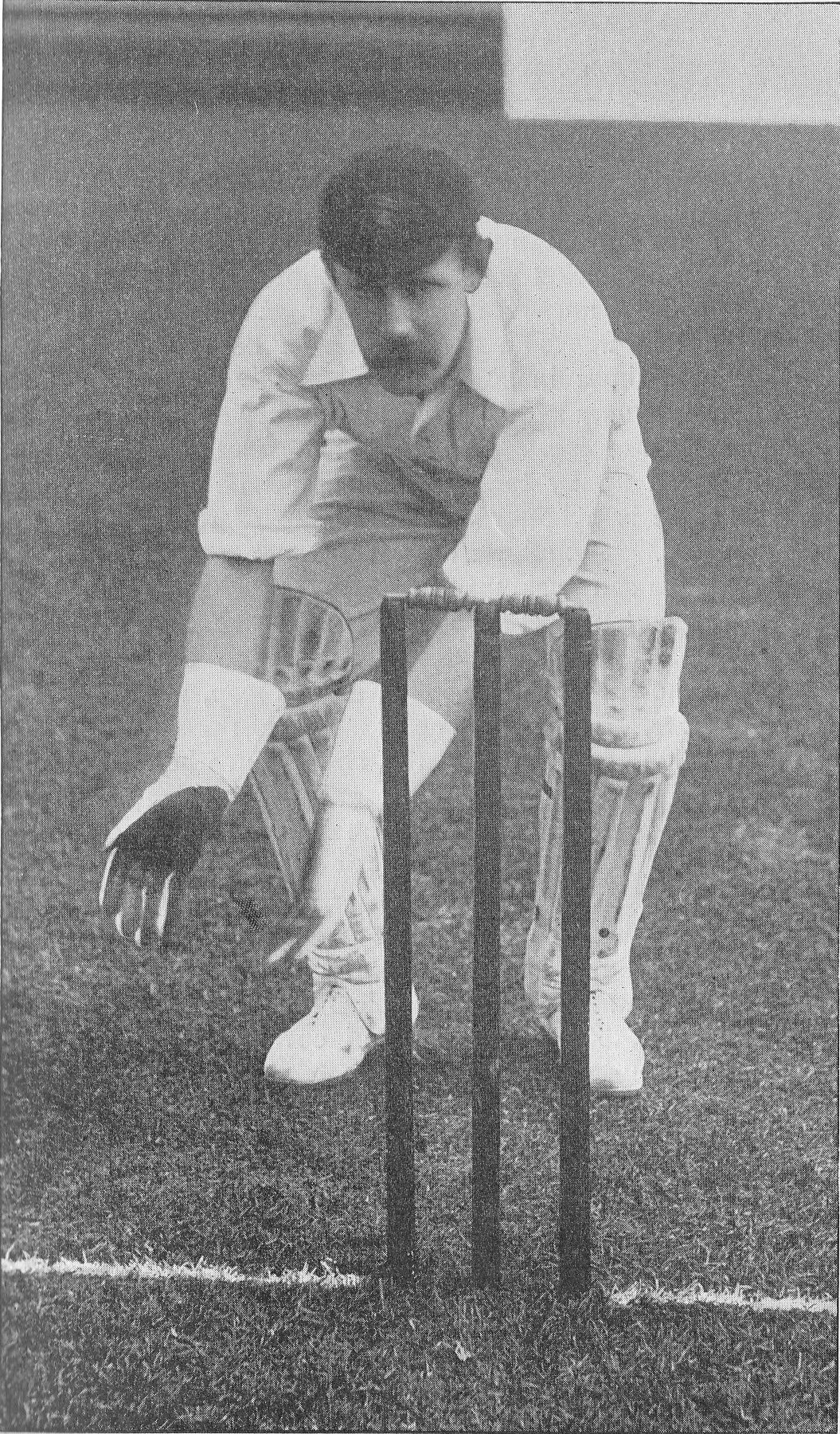
- Storer pictured in the 1890s

Personal information
- Full name: William Storer
- Born: 25 January 1867; Ripley, Derbyshire, England
- Died: 28 February 1912 (aged 45); Derby, England
- Batting: Right-handed
- Bowling: Leg-break
- Role: Wicket-keeper-batsman
- Relatives: Harry Storer (brother)

International information
- National side: England
- Test debut: 13 December 1897 v Australia
- Last Test: 1 June 1899 v Australia

Domestic team information
- Years: Team
- 1887–1905: Derbyshire
- 1893–1904: MCC

Career statistics
Competition	Test	First-class
Matches	6	289
Runs scored	215	12,966
Batting average	19.54	28.87
100s/50s	0/1	17/63
Top score	51	216*
Balls bowled	168	11,422
Wickets	2	232
Bowling average	54.00	33.89
5 wickets in innings	0	4
10 wickets in match	0	0
Best bowling	1/24	5/20
Catches/stumpings	11/–	376/55
- Source: CricketArchive, 30 April 2010

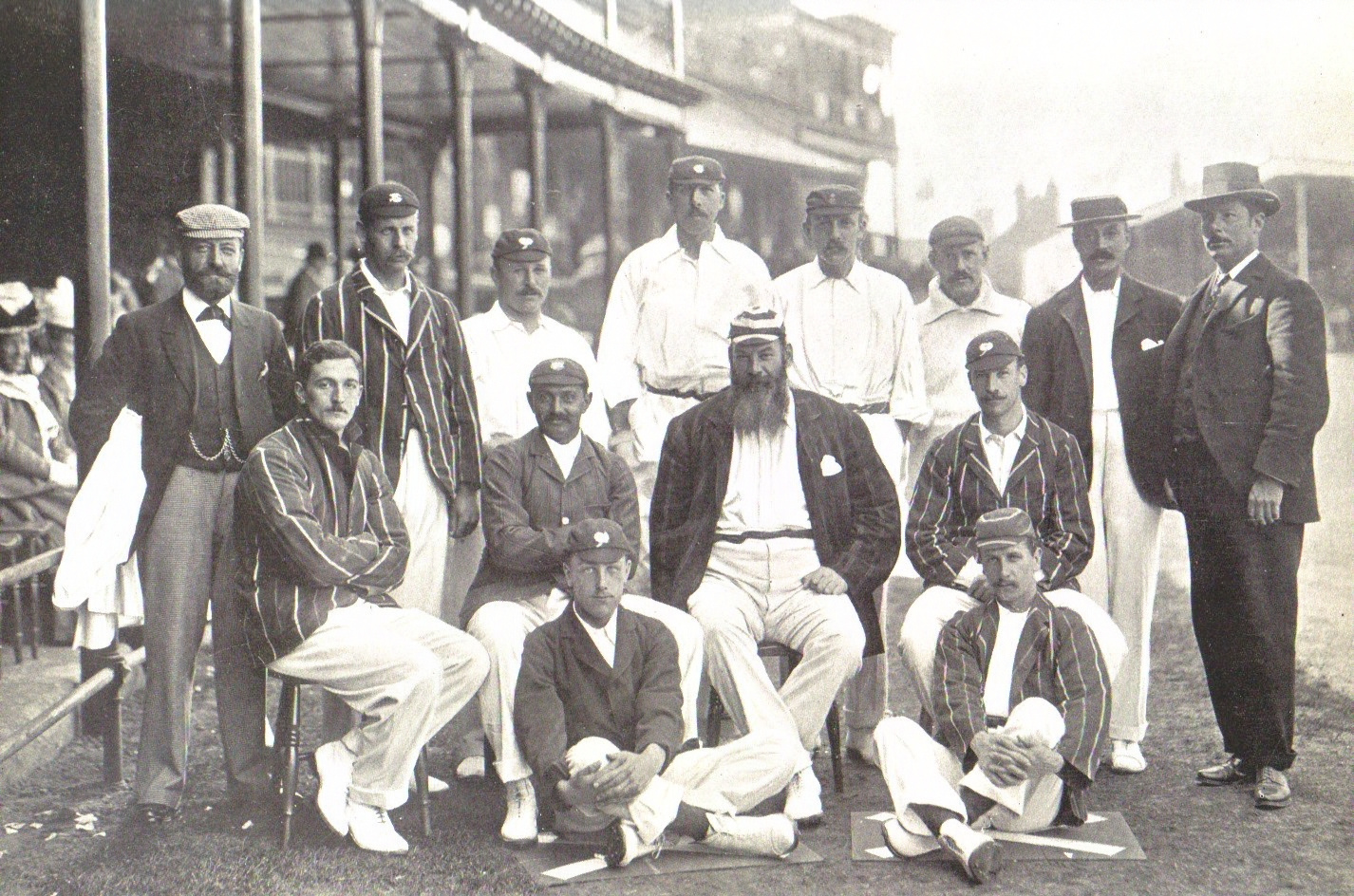
England team v. Australia, Trent Bridge 1899. Storer is in the back row, third from the right.

William Storer (25 January 1867 – 28 February 1912) was an English footballer and a cricketer who played six Test matches from 1897 to 1899, played first-class cricket for Derbyshire from 1887 to 1905 and played football for Derby County. He scored nearly 13,000 runs for Derbyshire and achieved over 430 dismissals from behind the stumps.

Storer was born at Ripley, Derbyshire, the son of John Storer, an engine smith, and his wife Elizabeth. In 1881 the family were living at Butterley Hill and he was a turner's apprentice.

Storer was a specialist wicket keeper who was reputed to stand up to the wicket against fast bowlers. He was also a highly skilled batsman at a time when wicket-keeper batsmen were rare and twice averaged over fifty in a season. His first-class record of 216 not out came against Leicestershire in the 1899 season and he was the first professional to score two hundreds, against a strong Yorkshire side, in a match. He was also a competent leg spinner, taking 232 first-class wickets at 33.89. Storer also appeared for London County.

Storer toured Australia for England, making his debut in the 1897 Test at Sydney and played against the tourists at home, his last Test coming at Trent Bridge in 1899 when he was also named a Wisden cricketer of the year. His Test appearances were limited by the selectors preference for Dick Lilley.

Storer was 'severely reprimanded' for 'objectionable language' during the 1898 test where he was overheard to say "You are a cheat, and you know it", during the luncheon on the final day of the 5th test match at the Sydney Cricket Ground.

Storer died in Derby at the age of 45. His brother Harry Storer also played cricket for Derbyshire and football for Derby County.

== See also ==
- List of English cricket and football players
