= Khaya (disambiguation) =

Khaya is a genus of five tree species in the mahogany family Meliaceae.

Khaya may also refer to:

== African given name ==
- Khaya Dladla (born 3 April 1990) is a South African actor, musician, model and tv presenter
- Khaya Dlanga is a South African writer, public speaker, and social media commentator
- Khaya Gqibitole, South African lectuter and writer
- Khaya Majola (cricketer) (1953–2000), South African cricket player and administrator, uncle of the below
- Khaya Majola (rugby union) (born 1992), South African rugby union player, nephew of the above
- Khaya Makina (6 June 1964 – 25 March 2021) was a General Officer in the South African Army from the artillery
- Khaya Magaxa (born 29 January 1964) is a South African politician
- Khaya Mthethwa (born 25 November 1986) is a South African singer-songwriter, musician, composer, arranger, and a multi-instrumentalist
- Khaya Zondo (born 7 March 1990) is a South African cricketer

== Other ==
- Hebrew given name, spelling variant of Chaya
- Sultana Khaya, Sahrawi human rights activist and an advocate of the independence of Western Sahara

== See also ==
- Kaya (disambiguation)
- Khyah
- Khanya
