= Derbyshire County Cricket Club in 1885 =

1885 season of an English cricket team

Derbyshire County Cricket Club seasons
1885 season
- Captain: Edmund Maynard
- Most runs: Frank Sugg
- Most wickets: William Cropper, Frank Shacklock
- Most catches: James Disney

Derbyshire County Cricket Club in 1885 was the cricket season when the English club Derbyshire had been playing for fourteen years. They won three first class matches out of eleven.

== 1885 season ==
Derbyshire played ten county matches, two each against Hampshire, Lancashire, Nottinghamshire, Surrey and Yorkshire and one against MCC. Edmund Maynard was in his first season as captain. Frank Sugg was top scorer. William Cropper and Frank Shacklock shared most wickets with 35 each.

William Eadie who made his debut in the season went on to play regularly for the club until 1899. Edwin Coup also made his debut and played several games over three seasons. Francis Dixon and Thomas Selby each played their one career match for Derbyshire during the season.

Derbyshire lost their two leading bowlers in the season. William Mycroft had joined in 1873 and had chalked up impressive bowling figures with his fast left arm action. Frank Shacklock had joined Derbyshire in the 1884 season and also achieved impressive figures, but returned to Nottinghamshire for the 1886 season. James Stubbings who had joined in 1880 played his last first class game in the season although he continued to appear for Derbyshire in non first class matches.

=== Matches ===
List of first class matches
No.	Date	V	Result	Margin	Notes
1	28 May 1885	Surrey; County Ground, Derby	Lost	Innings and 62 runs	W Read 123; FJ Shacklock 5-71; J Beaumont 5-25
2	04 Jun 1885	Lancashire; Old Trafford, Manchester	Won	73 runs	A Watson 6-28; J Crossland 5-89
3	08 Jun 1885	Yorkshire; Fartown, Huddersfield	Lost	Innings and 6 runs	T Peate 5-26 and 5–19; W Cropper 6-45; T Emmett 5-34
4	15 Jun 1885	MCC; Lord's Cricket Ground, St John's Wood	Lost	Innings and 17 runs	
5	25 Jun 1885	Hampshire; County Ground, Southampton	Won	Innings and 243 runs	FH Sugg 187; FJ Shacklock 5-51; W Cropper 7-25
6	03 Aug 1885	Lancashire; County Ground, Derby	Lost	10 wickets	A Watson 7-38; W Hall 6-47; J Briggs 9-29
7	06 Aug 1885	Surrey; Kennington Oval	Lost	Innings and 50 runs	W Read 109; WE Roller 5-34
8	10 Aug 1885	Yorkshire; County Ground, Derby	Drawn		FJ Shacklock 8-45 and 5-97
9	13 Aug 1885	Hampshire; County Ground, Derby	Won	7 wickets	H.H Armstrong 7-33; W Chatterton 5-13
10	24 Aug 1885	Nottinghamshire; County Ground, Derby	Lost	Innings and 250 runs	A Shrewsbury 118; W Flowers 173; GG Walker 7–105; B Barnes 7-40 and 6-54
11	31 Aug 1885	Nottinghamshire; Trent Bridge, Nottingham	Drawn		GG Walker 5-87

List of other matches
No.	Date	V	Result	Margin	Notes
1	18 Jun 1885	Staffordshire; County Ground, Stoke-on-Trent	Won	92 runs	
2	03 Jul 1885	Cheshire; Cale Green, Stockport	Drawn		
3	06 Jul 1885	Essex; County Ground, Derby	Lost	62 runs	
4	17 Jul 1885	Staffordshire; County Ground, Derby	Drawn		
5	20 Jul 1885	Cheshire; Park Road Ground, Buxton	Won	178 runs	

== Statistics ==
=== First-class batting averages ===
Name	Am/ Pro	Age	Hand	Matches	Inns	Runs	High score	Average	100s
E Coup	A	24	L	1	2	32	32*	32.00	0
FH Sugg	P	23	R	10	19	462	187	27.17	1
William Chatterton	P	23	R	13 (11)	24 (21)	485 (459)	62	23.09	0
W Cropper		22	R	11	21	343	80	18.05	0
WS Eadie	A	20	R	10	19	282	62	16.58	0
GG Walker	A	24	L	8	15	183	48	15.25	0
LC Docker	A	25	R	10	18	255	41	14.16	0
W Hall	A	25	R	7	10	117	43	13.00	0
H Slater		30	R	1	2	11	11	11.00	0
WW Wood-Sims	A	27	R	11	19	206	46	10.84	0
EAJ Maynard	A	24	R	8	13	124	38	9.53	0
W Mycroft	P	44	R	7 (3)	12 (6)	52 (33)	16	8.66	0
JD Chatterton		18	R	2	4	34	16	8.50	0
F Dixon	A	30	R	1	2	15	15	7.50	0
FJ Shacklock	P	23	R	9	16	116	30	7.25	0
J Marlow		30	R	4	7	29	17	4.83	0
T Mycroft	P	37	L	1	2	9	9	4.50	0
JJ Disney	P	25	R	11	18	56	14	4.30	0
J Stubbings	P	29	R	1	2	8	8	4.00	0
TG Selby	A	34	R	1	2	3	2	1.50	0

W Mycroft played several games for MCC. Chatterton played two matches for scratch sides against the Australians.

Leading first-class batsmen for Derbyshire by runs scored
Name	Mat	Inns	Runs	HS	Ave	100
FH Sugg	10	19	462	187	27.17	1
William Chatterton	11	21	459	62	21.86 (a)	0
W Cropper	11	21	343	80	18.05	0
WS Eadie	10	19	282	62	16.58	0
LC Docker	10	18	255	41	14.16	0

(a) Figures adjusted for non Derbyshire matches

=== First-class bowling averages ===
Name	Hand	Balls	Runs	Wickets	BB	Average
W Cropper	L M	1349	514	35	7-25	14.68
FJ Shacklock	R F	1189	569	35	8-45	16.25
W Mycroft	L F	1298	480 (218)	27 (9)	8-45 (4-97)	17.77
William Chatterton	R Sl	1104	411	25	5-13	16.44
GG Walker	L F & Sl	896	414	19	7-105	21.78
W Hall	R M	589	308	12	6-47	25.66
J Marlow	R M	488	190	5	3-82	38.00
H Slater	R M	140	44	1	1-44	44.00
WW Wood-Sims		96	33	1	1-16	33.00
J Stubbings	R F	40	29	1	1-29	29.00
FH Sugg	R Under	24	14	0		
T Mycroft	R M	4	5	0		
WS Eadie		8	13	0		
TG Selby	R F	16	7	0	0-7	

Leading first class bowlers for Derbyshire by wickets taken
Name	Balls	Runs	Wkts	BBI	Ave
W Cropper	1349	514	35	7-25	14.68
FJ Shacklock	1189	569	35	8-45	16.25
William Chatterton	1104	411	25	5-13	16.44
GG Walker	896	414	19	7-105	21.78

=== Wicket keeping ===
- James Disney Catches 18 Stumping 2

== See also ==
- Derbyshire County Cricket Club seasons
- 1885 English cricket season
