= Derbyshire County Cricket Club in 1886 =

1886 season of an English cricket team

Derbyshire County Cricket Club seasons
1886 season
- Captain: Edmund Maynard
- Most runs: William Chatterton
- Most wickets: William Cropper "G G" Walker
- Most catches: James Disney

Derbyshire County Cricket Club in 1886 represents the cricket season when the English club Derbyshire had been playing for fifteen years and was the penultimate season before they lost first class status for seven years.

== 1886 season ==
Derbyshire CCC played nine county games in 1886, and two other first class matches which were against MCC and Australians. Their only first class win was against MCC and the poor performance contributed to the club losing first class status at the end of the following year. They also played two non first class matches against Essex, which were both wins for Derbyshire and included a century for W Chatterton and 8 for 48 by Davidson

The captain for the year was Edmund Maynard. The top scorer was William Chatterton. William Cropper and "G G" Walker shared the top bowling spot.

George Davidson, who became one of Derbyshire's leading bowlers made his debut in 1886. James Stubbings and A S Sugden played for Derbyshire in the matches against Essex.

Several players made their final appearances for Derbyshire in the season. George Hay had first played in 1875 although he had played few games since 1880. William Wood-Sims and Joseph Marlow had first played in 1879 and Stephen Doughty in 1880. Ludford Docker who first played in 1881 went to Birmingham to set up the family firm and Alfred Cochrane who had played several games since 1884 tok up employment in Northumberland. Frank Sugg had also joined Derbyshire in 1884 but moved on to Lancashire. Joseph Chatterton, brother of William and a player of promise died at the age of 19 in November 1886.

=== Matches ===
List of first class matches
No.	Date	V	Result	Margin	Notes
1	13 May 1886	MCC; Lord's Cricket Ground, St John's Wood	Won	Innings and 28 runs	W Attewell 6-69; GG Walker 6-26
2	27 May 1886	Lancashire; Old Trafford, Manchester	Drawn		A Watson 7-15
3	07 Jun 1886	Australians; County Ground, Derby	Lost	6 Wickets	G Giffen 7-41 and 9-60
4	17 Jun 1886	Yorkshire; County Ground, Derby	Lost	3 Wickets	W Cropper 5-77
5	21 Jun 1886	Kent; County Ground, Derby	Lost	173 runs	W Cropper 6-34; GG Hearne 5-34; J Wooton 5-52
6	05 Jul 1886	Surrey; County Ground, Derby	Lost	157 runs	GG Walker 7-38 and 5-75; T Bowley 6-58
7	29 Jul 1886	Kent; Mote Park, Maidstone	Lost	Innings and 13 runs	J Wooton 6-41
8	02 Aug 1886	Gloucestershire; County Ground, Derby	Lost	47 runs	W G Grace 6-34; W Woof 6-50
9	05 Aug 1886	Surrey; Kennington Oval	Lost	Innings 122 runs	W W Read 115; T Bowley 6-39; George Lohmann 5-50
10	16 Aug 1886	Lancashire; County Ground, Derby	Lost	10 Wickets	A Watson 6-29 and 6-26
11	26 Aug 1886	Yorkshire; Recreation Ground, Holbeck	Lost	121 runs	I Grimshaw 122; W Bates 106 5-30 and 5-45;

List of other matches
No.	Date	V	Result	Margin	Notes
1	12 Jul 1886	Essex; County Ground, Derby	Won	46 runs	
2	09 Aug 1886	Essex; County Ground, Leyton	Won	Innings and 78 runs	
3	23 Aug 1886	Burnley Cricket Club; Turf Moor, Burnley	Won	8 wickets	1 day match

== Statistics ==
=== First-class batting averages ===
Name	Am/ Pro	Age	Hand	Matches	Inns	Runs	High score	Average	100s
William Chatterton	P	23	R	13	25	462	97	21.00	0
FH Sugg	P	24	R	12	23	408	62	17.73	0
LC Docker	A	26	R	8	14	241	64	17.21	0
W Cropper		23	R	13	24	370	93	15.41	0
SH Evershed	A	25	R	3	6	64	26	10.66	0
E Coup	A	25	L	7	14	124	3	9.53	0
W Hall	A	26	R	2	3	9	4*	9.00	0
George Davidson	P	19	R	11	21	153	33*	8.50	0
J Marlow		31	R	2	3	25	11	8.33	0
GG Walker	A	25	L	14	26	184	39	8.00	0
Walter Sugg		26	R	6	12	95	23	7.91	0
EAJ Maynard	A	25	R	10	19	110	23	6.47	0
JD Chatterton		19	R	8	16	74	21	5.28	0
WW Wood-Sims	A	28	R	2	2	10	6	5.00	0
WS Eadie	A	21	R	5	9	42	13	4.66	0
J Brelsford	A	30	R	1	2	8	8	4.00	0
S Doughty		30	R	1	2	8	8	4.00	0
G Hay	A	35	R	1	2	6	4	3.00	0
JJ Disney	P	26	R	12	21	27	6	1.92	0
H Slater		31	R	1	1	1	1	1.00	0
AHJ Cochrane	A	21	R	8	15	59	9*	0	0

William Chatterton, Frank Sugg, William Cropper, GG Walker and James Disney played first class matched for other teams during the season.

=== First-class bowling averages ===
Name	Hand	Balls	Runs	Wickets	BB	Average
W Cropper	L M	2110	739	46	6-34	16.06
GG Walker	L F & Sl	2211	923	46	7-38	20.06
George Davidson	R MF	1731	627	39	9-42	16.50
AHJ Cochrane	L M	1236	479	30	5-19	15.96
William Chatterton	R S	1244	380	16	4-22	23.75
Walter Sugg	R M	516	214	11	3-45	19.45
JD Chatterton	R Sl	252	119	5	1-9	23.80
S Doughty	R O	70	31	3	3-28	10.33
W Hall	R M	48	22	1	1-18	22.00
J Marlow	R M	60	21	1	1-11	21.00
SH Evershed	R M	32	13	0	0	0
H Slater	R M	32	14	0		
J Brelsford	R M	40	19	0		

=== Wicket keeping ===
- James Disney Catches 13 Stumping 3

== See also ==
- Derbyshire County Cricket Club seasons
- 1886 English cricket season
