= Thomas Barnes (cricketer) =

English cricketer

Personal information
- Full name: Thomas Barnes
- Born: 11 May 1849; Sutton-in-Ashfield, Nottinghamshire, England
- Died: 22 September 1873 (aged 24); Sutton-in-Ashfield, Nottinghamshire, England
- Batting: Right-handed
- Bowling: Right-arm medium
- Relatives: Billy Barnes (brother); James Barnes (nephew)

Domestic team information
- Years: Team
- 1872: Nottinghamshire

Career statistics
Competition	First-class
Matches	6
Runs scored	70
Batting average	8.75
100s/50s	–/–
Top score	33
Balls bowled	24
Wickets	2
Bowling average	11.50
5 wickets in innings	–
10 wickets in match	–
Best bowling	2/23
Catches/stumpings	2/–
- Source: Cricinfo, 21 May 2012

Thomas Barnes (11 May 1849 – 22 September 1873) was an English cricketer. Barnes was a right-handed batsman who bowled right-arm medium pace. He was born at Sutton-in-Ashfield, Nottinghamshire.

Barnes made his first-class debut for Richard Daft's XI against the United North of England Eleven at the Recreation Ground, Holbeck. He later made his debut for Nottinghamshire in first-class cricket against Surrey at Trent Bridge in 1872. He played four further first-class matches for the county, all of which came in 1872, with his final appearance coming against Gloucestershire at Clifton College. In his total of five first-class appearances for Nottinghamshire, he scored a total of 65 runs at an average of 10.83, with a high score of 33. With the ball, he took 2 wickets at a bowling average of 11.50, with best figures of 2/23.

A year after playing for Nottinghamshire, Barnes died from typhoid, at the town of his birth on 22 September. His brother, Billy, played Test cricket for England, while his nephew, James Barnes, also played first-class cricket.
