= Andrew Jordaan =

South African cricketer

Personal information
- Full name: Andrew Charles Jordaan
- Born: 1 November 1954 (age 72); Port Elizabeth, Cape Province, South Africa
- Batting: Right-handed

Domestic team information
- Years: Team
- 1981/82 – 1987/88: Eastern Province

Career statistics
| Competition | FC |
|---|---|
| Matches | 7 |
| Runs scored | 226 |
| Batting average | 16.14 |
| 100s/50s | 0/1 |
| Top score | 56 |
| Balls bowled | 6 |
| Wickets | 0 |
| Bowling average | – |
| 5 wickets in innings | – |
| 10 wickets in match | – |
| Best bowling | – |
| Catches/stumpings | 4/– |
- Source: Cricinfo, 15 July 2025

Andrew Charles Jordaan (born 1 November 1954) is a former South African cricketer who represented Eastern Province in the Howa Bowl. Jordaan was the first ever cricketer to be timed out in a first-class cricket match when he failed to arrive at the ground to continue his innings in a game against Transvaal at Port Elizabeth in 1988. He was delayed as the roads were bad after a downpour the previous night. This feat was only recognised after the decision to recognise matches played under the South African Cricket Board which governed cricket played by non-white South Africans during apartheid. Jordaan is one of only five cricketers to have been timed out in the history of cricket.

== Playing career ==
Jordaan played seven first class matches between 1982 and 1988. All of his appearances were in the Howa Bowl, a South African cricket competition which was contested between Eastern Province, Natal, Transvaal and Western Province. Jordaan made his debut against Western Province cricket team on 23 January 1982 at the Adcock Stadium in Port Elizabeth. Batting at the top of the order to failed to make significant runs in both his innings and had to wait another five years before he was picked again by Eastern Province.

He was recalled in 1987 but again failed to make runs scoring just 8 in two innings batting at number two against Transvaal. He scored 41 runs in an innings against Transvaal that season and found favour with the selectors playing four games in 1988. Here Jordaan scored a career best of 56 playing against Western Province at Cape Town.
