= Gedaya Abrahams =

South African cricketer

Personal information
- Full name: Gedaya Abrahams
- Bowling: Right arm medium pace

Career statistics
Competition	First-class
Matches	2
Runs scored	28
Batting average	14
100s/50s	0/0
Top score	12*
Balls bowled	234
Wickets	2
Bowling average	47
5 wickets in innings	0
10 wickets in match	0
Best bowling	1/15
Catches/stumpings	1/0
- Source: CricketArchive (subscription required), 25 June 2016

Gedaya Abrahams is a South African cricketer, who played two First-class matches in the Howa Bowl for Eastern Province in the summer of 1981–82.

Abrahams received his shot at First-class cricket when six members of the Eastern Province team refused to play matches against Natal and Transvaal over the festive season.
