= Thomas Selby (cricketer, born 1851) =

English cricketer

Personal information
- Full name: Thomas Gothard Selby
- Born: 19 February 1851; North Wingfield, Derbyshire, England
- Died: 6 November 1924 (aged 73); Shirebrook, England
- Batting: Right-handed
- Bowling: Right-arm fast

Domestic team information
- Years: Team
- 1885: Derbyshire
- Only FC: 15 June 1885 Derbyshire v MCC

Career statistics
Competition	First-class
Matches	1
Runs scored	3
Batting average	1.50
100s/50s	0/0
Top score	2
Balls bowled	16
Wickets	0
Bowling average	–
5 wickets in innings	–
10 wickets in match	–
Best bowling	–
Catches/stumpings	0/–
- Source: CricketArchive, February 2012

Thomas Gothard Selby (19 February 1851 – 6 November 1924) was an English cricketer who played for Derbyshire in 1885.

Selby was born in North Wingfield, Derbyshire. He played his only game for Derbyshire in the 1885 season against Marylebone Cricket Club (MCC) at Lord's in June. In the match, he scored 1 and 2 and bowled 4 overs for the loss of 7 runs. Most of the Derbyshire bowling was delivered by Shacklock and Mycroft. With the captain Ludford Docker absent hurt from the second innings, Derbyshire lost the match by an innings margin. Selby was a right-handed batsman and played 2 innings in one first-class match. He was a right-arm fast bowler but took no wickets in his four overs.

Selby died in Shirebrook, Derbyshire at the age of 73.
