= Alfred Cochrane =

English cricketer (1865–1948)

Personal information
- Full name: Alfred Henry John Cochrane
- Born: 26 January 1865; Moka, Mauritius
- Died: 14 December 1948 (aged 83); Batheaston, Somerset, England
- Batting: Right-handed
- Bowling: Left-arm medium
- Relatives: Charles Cochrane

Domestic team information
- Years: Team
- 1884–1886: Derbyshire
- 1885–1888: Oxford University
- First-class debut: 4 August 1884 Derbyshire v Lancashire
- Last First-class: 2 July 1888 Oxford University v Cambridge University

Career statistics
Competition	First-class
Matches	28
Runs scored	347
Batting average	10.51
100s/50s	0/2
Top score	61*
Balls bowled	4,977
Wickets	103
Bowling average	18.99
5 wickets in innings	4
10 wickets in match	0
Best bowling	7/66
Catches/stumpings	16/–
- Source: , 22 August 2011

Alfred Henry John Cochrane (26 January 1865 – 14 December 1948) was an English cricketer who played first-class cricket for Derbyshire between 1884 and 1886, and for Oxford University between 1885 and 1888. He subsequently made his name as a writer on sporting subjects and of light verse.

Cochrane was the second son of Rev. David Crawford Cochrane, Master of Etwall Hospital (almshouses) and his wife Jane Tomlinson. He was born Moka, Mauritius where his father was at the time Chaplain to the Bishop. He was educated at Repton School and made his debut for Derbyshire in the 1884 season in August against Lancashire, when he took 6 for 51. He played two more matches for Derbyshire during the season. He also played football for Derby County in 1884 in its pre-league days.

Cochrane went on to Hertford College, Oxford and played cricket more regularly for University over the next four years, taking part three times in the Varsity match. He played two matches for Derbyshire in the 1885 season, neither of which was against a first-class side, and played only in the Derbyshire match against the Australians in the 1886 season. In 28 first-class matches he took 103 wickets with his left arm medium pace, with a best performance of 7 for 66, at an average of just 18.99.

Cochrane moved to Northumberland when he joined Armstrong Whitworth, becoming secretary of the company. There, he played minor county cricket for Northumberland. In January, 1910 he unsuccessfully contested Tyneside, and from 1912 to 1927 he served as a member of the River Tyne Commission. Cochrane was a governor of his old school, Repton, from 1921 to 1944.

Cochrane had a skill at writing light verse, and his writing had a graceful touch. He wrote of cricket – the "uncertain game" – and of "the man who snicketh the length ball." He was interested in the nineteenth-century writers of light verse, especially in J K S (James Kenneth Stephen) and Winthrop Mackworth Praed with whom his verse was compared. Of football he wrote in the poem "To Anthea".

I once admitted—to my shame—
That football was a brutal game.
Because She hates it.

Later he recalled with nostalgia the expeditions in the Highlands of his youth, and lamented that "the way, though once it was short, is long." He contributed to The Times for many years on sporting topics, especially on cricket.

Cochrane died at Batheaston, Somerset at the age of 83.

Cochrane married in 1895 Ethel Noble youngest daughter of Sir Andrew Noble, 1st Baronet. He was the brother of Sir Arthur Cochrane a distinguished member of the College of Arms and Charles Walter Hamilton Cochrane of the Federated Malay States service.

== Publications ==
- "The Kestrel's Nest" 1894
- "Leviore Plectro" 1896
- "Told in the Pavilion" 1896
- "Collected Verses" 1903
- "The Sweeper of the Leaves" 1908
- "Later Verses" 1918
- "Records of the Harlequins" 1930
- and verses and articles for Newspapers and Magazines.
