= Khaya Majola =

Khaya Majola may refer to:

- Khaya Majola (cricketer) (1953–2000), South African cricket player and administrator, uncle of the below
- Khaya Majola (rugby union) (born 1992), South African rugby union player, nephew of the above
