= John Beaumont =

John Beaumont may refer to:

- John of Beaumont (1288–1356), Dutch nobleman
- John Beaumont, 2nd Baron Beaumont (aft. 1317–1342), Baron Beaumont
- John Beaumont, 4th Baron Beaumont (1361–1396), English soldier in the Hundred Years' War, Lord Warden of the Cinque Ports
- John Beaumont, 1st Viscount Beaumont (c. 1409–1460)
- John Beaumont (judge) (fl. 1550), master of the rolls
- John Beaumont (by 1508-58/64), MP for Leicester, Bossiney and Liverpool
- Sir John Beaumont, 1st Baronet (1583–1627), English poet
- John Beaumont (died 1701), English politician, MP for Nottingham in 1685–89 and Hastings in 1689–90
- John Beaumont (geologist) (c. 1650–1731), English geologist
- John Beaumont (cricketer) (1855–1920), English fast bowler for Surrey County Cricket Club and Yorkshire County Cricket Club
- John Beaumont (sport shooter) (1924–2000), American Olympic shooter
- John Michael Beaumont (1927–2016), Seigneur of Sark from 1974
- John Ralph Beaumont (1927–1992), Rhodesian politician
- John Thomas Barber Beaumont (1774–1841), British army officer, painter, author, and philanthropist
- John Erlick Beaumont (born 1986), Honduran footballer, see 2011–12 Honduran Liga Nacional
- Sir John William Fisher Beaumont (1877–1974), chief justice of the Bombay High Court

== See also ==
- Beaumont (disambiguation)
- Jack Beaumont (disambiguation)
