= Joseph Marlow =

English cricketer and umpire

Personal information
- Born: 12 December 1854; Bulwell, Nottinghamshire, England
- Died: 8 June 1923 (aged 68); Bulwell, Nottinghamshire, England
- Batting: Right-handed
- Bowling: Right-arm medium
- Role: Bowler

Domestic team information
- Years: Team
- 1879–1886: Derbyshire
- FC debut: 18 August 1879 Derbyshire v Nottinghamshire
- Last FC: 29 July 1886 Derbyshire v Kent

Career statistics
Competition	First-class
Matches	24
Runs scored	317
Batting average	7.92
100s/50s	0/0
Top score	25
Balls bowled	3,359
Wickets	60
Bowling average	20.6
5 wickets in innings	5
10 wickets in match	1
Best bowling	7/46
Catches/stumpings	23/–
- Source: CricInro, 24 August 2009

Joseph Marlow (12 December 1854 – 8 June 1923) was an English cricketer who played 24 first-class matches for Derbyshire County Cricket Club between 1879 and 1886.

Marlow was born at Bulwell, Nottinghamshire. In 1878 he played a match for Buxton against a touring Australia team, where he opened a 22-man batting line up scoring one and five, and took one wicket. He made his first-class debut for Derbyshire in the 1879 season against Nottinghamshire in July, when he took three wickets. However he did not play for Derbyshire again until the 1883 season. In the 1883 season he played five matches for the county in which he took a respectable number of wickets, most notably against Sussex with 6 for 27 and another 4 to make a ten wicket match. His most successful season of 1884, saw him play twelve matches and take 34 wickets at 19.97. He took 5 for 43 against MCC, 5 for 31 against Kent which included a hat trick, 5 for 40 against Surrey and his career best of 7 for 46 against Yorkshire. He played four matches in the 1885 season and two in the 1886 season but did not show the same level of performance.

A right-arm medium pace bowler, Marlow took 60 first-class wickets at 20.61. His right-handed batting scored 317 runs in 45 first-class innings at 7.92.

Marlow umpired one match between his county and a touring Australian side in 1886. He also returned to Derbyshire for a non-first-class in 1890, struggling with both bat and ball.

Marlow died at Bulwell at the age of 68.
