= Jack Manack =

South African cricketer

Personal information
- Full name: Abdulhack Ahmed Manack
- Born: 21 August 1967 (age 59); Vereeniging, Transvaal, South Africa
- Batting: Right-handed
- Bowling: Right-arm fast-medium
- Role: Bowler

Domestic team information
- Years: Team
- 1983/84–1992/93: Transvaal
- 1989/90: Western Province

Career statistics
Competition	First-class	List A
Matches	48	2
Runs scored	996	–
Batting average	17.47	–
100s/50s	0/4	–
Top score	83	–
Balls bowled	8,548	60
Wickets	211	0
Bowling average	16.55	–
5 wickets in innings	12	–
10 wickets in match	1	–
Best bowling	7/17	–
Catches/stumpings	25/–	0/–
- Source: CricketArchive, 17 April 2023

Abdulhack Ahmed "Jack" Manack (born 21 August 1967) is a former South African first-class cricketer who played for Transvaal and Western Province in the Howa Bowl. He was born at Vereeniging in 1967.

Manack, one of the competition's most outstanding bowlers, was the leading Howa Bowl wicket-taker in a record five seasons, including each of the last four. He was particularly consistent for Transvaal and averaged under 20 with the ball every season from 1985/86 to 1990/91. He represented Western Province in just one season, helping them to the title in 1989/90. His best bowling performance came that season when he took 7 for 17 to dismiss Eastern Province for just 50 runs, which prompted Western Province's captain to make an unusual declaration when it was their turn to bat, calling the openers back after just one ball. Western Province went on to win by three wickets.
