= Matthew Burrows =

English cricketer

Personal information
- Full name: Matthew Burrows
- Born: 18 August 1855; Chesterfield, Derbyshire, England
- Died: 29 May 1893 (aged 37); Beeston, Leeds, England
- Batting: Right-handed
- Bowling: Right-arm fast

Domestic team information
- Years: Team
- 1880: Yorkshire
- 1884: Derbyshire
- FC debut: 3 June 1880 Yorkshire v Middlesex
- Last FC: 29 May 1884 Derbyshire v Surrey

Career statistics
Competition	First-class
Matches	7
Runs scored	95
Batting average	7.91
100s/50s	0/0
Top score	23
Balls bowled	16
Wickets	0
Bowling average	–
5 wickets in innings	–
10 wickets in match	–
Best bowling	–
Catches/stumpings	2/–
- Source: CricketArchive, 29 August 2011

Matthew Burrows (18 August 1855 – 29 May 1893) was an English first-class cricketer, who played for Yorkshire in 1880, and for Derbyshire in 1884.

Burrows was born in Chesterfield, Derbyshire. He is first recorded as turning out for Holbeck in 1877, when like many of his team he was bowled by W. G. Grace. He played for Holbeck again in 1878. In 1880, he made his debut for the Yorkshire side against Middlesex, when he opened the batting in the first innings. After making four runs, he moved down the order in the second innings, when he made his highest score of 23. He played five more matches for Yorkshire in the season, but his only game for the club in 1881 was not of first-class status.

In the 1884 season, Burrows played one match for Derbyshire against Surrey.

In seven first-class matches he scored 95 runs at 7.91, with a best of 23. He bowled 10 balls of round arm fast medium without success.

Burrows died in Beeston, Leeds aged 37.
