= Frank Sugg =

English cricketer and footballer

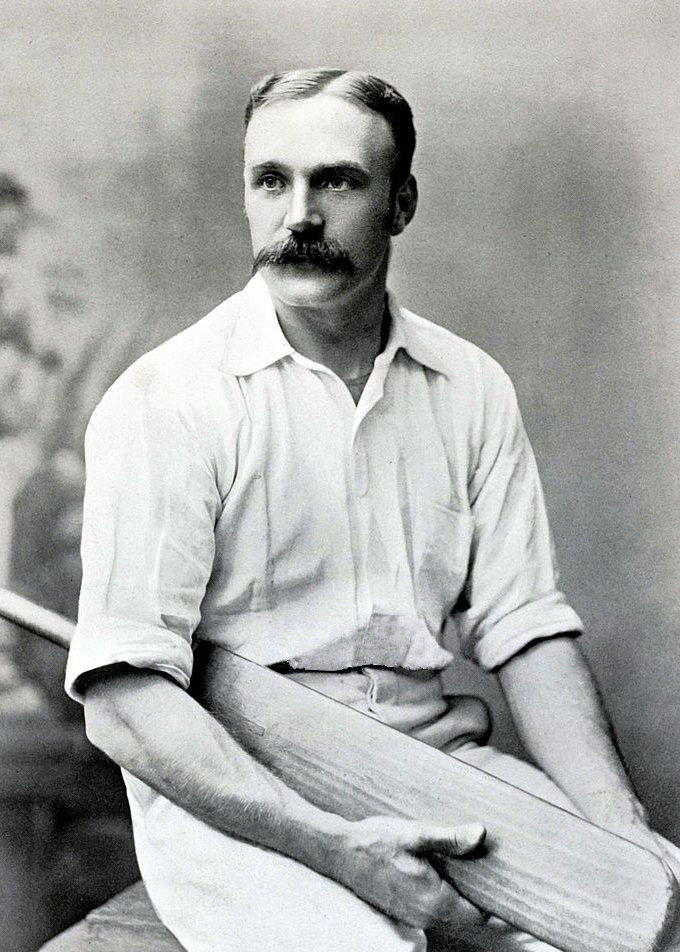
- Sugg in about 1895

Personal information
- Full name: Frank Howe Sugg
- Born: 11 January 1862; Ilkeston, Derbyshire, England
- Died: 29 May 1933 (aged 71); Waterloo, Liverpool, England
- Height: 6 ft 0 in (1.83 m)
- Batting: Right-handed
- Role: Occasional wicket-keeper

International information
- National side: England
- Test debut: 13 August 1888 v Australia
- Last Test: 3 September 1888 v Australia

Domestic team information
- Years: Team
- 1883: Yorkshire
- 1884–1886: Derbyshire
- 1887–1899: Lancashire

Career statistics
Competition	Test	First-class
Matches	2	305
Runs scored	55	11,859
Batting average	27.50	24.45
100s/50s	0/0	16/50
Top score	31	220
Balls bowled	–	397
Wickets	–	10
Bowling average	–	27.30
5 wickets in innings	–	0
10 wickets in match	–	0
Best bowling	–	2/12
Catches/stumpings	0/–	167/1
- Source: Cricinfo, 26 July 2010

Frank Howe Sugg (11 January 1862 – 29 May 1933) was an English footballer and first-class cricketer. He played for England in two Test matches in 1888 and for three county cricket clubs – Yorkshire in 1883, Derbyshire from 1884 to 1886 and Lancashire from 1887 to 1899. He also played for five football clubs.

== Cricket career ==
Sugg was born at Ilkeston, Derbyshire and became a solicitor's clerk and was living with his widowed mother at Nether Hallam in 1881. Though born in Derbyshire, he lived his early life in Yorkshire and made his first-class debut for Yorkshire in 1883. In the 1884 season, Sugg went to play for Derbyshire where he was top scorer for the club and regarded as the best bat in a team that suffered the rare ignominy of an anti-perfect season losing all ten of its county games. In the 1885 season, Sugg scored 187 against Hampshire at Southampton and was second in the averages to Ludford Docker. He was second in the averages in the 1886 season to William Chatterton.

With Derbyshire's fortunes declining, in 1887 he went to Lancashire, and it was during his term at Old Trafford that he appeared for England in two Test matches. In 1890 he was one of the "Nine Great Professional Batsmen" profiled in Wisden. Sugg scored 1000 runs in a season five times, all during his time with Lancashire. He was one of the first players (after James Southerton) to represent three teams in county cricket. His benefit match in 1897 raised 1000 pounds.

He was six feet tall and strongly built and had a sharp eye for the ball, revelling in the drive and hook over square leg. Sugg was shaky at the start of an innings, but once settled hit the ball very hard, and was also an excellent outfielder. England won both Tests that Sugg played in by an innings.

== Football career ==
Sugg first played top-class association football for Bolton Wanderers in the 1882–83 season. However his stay was brief. In 1883–84 Sugg signed for The Wednesday and also captained their team. From November 1884 until March 1885 Sugg played for and captained Derby County. From March 1885 until September 1888 he played for and captained Burnley. Sugg was described by a commentator as a "play anywhere footballer as long as he could play football". Sugg signed for Everton in September 1888.

Playing at centre forward, Sugg made his Everton and League debut on 6 October 1888 at Anfield, the then home of Everton. The visitors were Aston Villa and Everton won 2–0. Sugg appeared in nine of the 22 League matches in the 1888–89 season. He was retained for 1889–90 but only played once, taking his total to ten League appearances without scoring. He returned to Burnley in 1890 but did not play for their first team.

== Personal life ==
Sugg had massive biceps and took part in weightlifting, long-distance swimming and shot put. He also played in the final of the Liverpool amateur billiards championship, won numerous prizes in rifle shooting and held the record for throwing a cricket ball.

Sugg died in Waterloo, Liverpool at the age of 71.

== See also ==
- List of English cricket and football players
