= Derbyshire County Cricket Club in 1884 =

1884 season of an English cricket team

Derbyshire County Cricket Club seasons
1884 season
- Captain: Ludford Docker
- Most runs: Frank Sugg
- Most wickets: William Cropper; Joseph Marlow
- Most catches: Thomas Mycroft

Derbyshire County Cricket Club in 1884 represents the cricket season when the English club Derbyshire had been playing for thirteen years. They lost all ten county matches and their only victory was against MCC. Partly in response to this the club created as an offshoot the football club Derby County F.C. in 1884.

== 1884 cricket season ==
Derbyshire played ten county matches, one against the touring Australians and one against MCC. Ludford Docker was captain for his only season. In a sparse season without any centuries, Frank Sugg was top scorer. William Cropper and Joseph Marlow shared most wickets with 34 each.

The season was marked by the arrival of the two Sugg brothers from Yorkshire - Frank and Walter. Frank moved to Lancashire CCC after three years, but Walter had a long career with Derbyshire. Frank Shacklock played the first of two seasons for the club. Cricket poet Alfred Cochrane made his debut, sharing his appearances with Oxford University over the following years. Joseph Chatterton, younger brother of William, played the first of three seasons. William Shipton played one match but only played for the county again when they were without first class status. Matthew Burrows played his one career match during the season.

The season saw the retirement of two originals of the first Derbyshire side in 1871 - Robert Smith and John Platts. Platts returned to the sport as an umpire. Two other long-timers also left - Thomas Foster first played in 1873. He was running a pub and later returned to umpire. Henry Shaw had joined in 1875.

=== Matches ===
List of first class matches
No.	Date	V	Result	Margin	Notes
1	22 May 1884	Lancashire; Old Trafford, Manchester	Lost	42 runs	J Briggs 112; FJ Shacklock 5-42; RG Barlow 7-30
2	29 May 1884	Surrey; County Ground, Derby	Lost	5 wickets	J Marlow 5-40; CE Horner 5-40
3	02 Jun 1884	Australians; County Ground, Derby	Lost	Innings and 40 runs	Fred Spofforth 7-31 and 5-52; G Giffen 5-50
4	05 Jun 1884	Kent; County Ground, Derby	Lost	67 runs	J Marlow 5-31
5	09 Jun 1884	MCC; Lord's Cricket Ground, St John's Wood	Won	7 runs	W Cropper 6-46; A Rylott 6-41; J Marlow 5-43
6	23 Jun 1884	Yorkshire; County Ground, Derby	Lost	10 wickets	E Peate 5-30; J Marlow 7-46; T Emmett 7-20
7	28 Jul 1884	Sussex; County Ground, Derby	Lost	50 runs	W Blackman 5-22; AB Hide 5-19
8	04 Aug 1884	Lancashire; County Ground, Derby	Lost	Innings and 36 runs	AHJ Cochrane 6-51; A Watson 5-25
9	11 Aug 1884	Sussex; County Ground, Hove	Lost	7 wickets	
10	18 Aug 1884	Kent; Bat and Ball Ground, Gravesend	Lost	Innings and 9 runs	Lord Harris 112; GG Hearne 6-33
11	21 Aug 1884	Surrey; Kennington Oval	Lost	7 wickets	CE Horner 6-79; ED Barratt 5-91
12	25 Aug 1884	Yorkshire; Park Avenue Cricket Ground, Bradford	Lost	10 wickets	FJ Shacklock 5-47; T Emmett 6-28

List of other matches
No.	Date	V	Result	Margin	Notes
1	12 Jun 1884	Staffordshire; County Ground, Derby	Won	Innings and 24 runs	
2	21 Jul 1884	Staffordshire; Broomfield Ground, Harry Mitchell Park, Smethwick	Won	3 wickets	

== Statistics ==
=== First-class batting averages ===
Name	Am/ Pro	Age	Hand	Matches	Inns	Runs	High score	Average	100s
SH Evershed	A	23	R	2	3	53	50	17.66	0
LC Docker	A	24	R	12	23	381	58	17.31	0
FH Sugg	P	22	R	13	26	439	73	16.88	0
WW Wood-Sims	A	26	R	9	18	285	44	16.76	0
GG Walker	A	23	L	9	18	232	66	16.57	0
W Cropper		21	R	12	24	366	46	15.91	0
GB Barrington	A	27	R	4	8	114	50	14.25	0
Walter Sugg		24	R	3	6	55	26*	13.75	0
AHJ Cochrane	A	19	R	3	6	81	50	13.50	0
H Shaw	A	30	R	1	2	12	12*	12.00	0
T Mycroft	P	36	L	12	24	148	24*	11.38	0
FJ Shacklock	P	22	R	9	18	171	50	10.68	0
T Foster	P	35	R	9	18	178	33*	10.47	0
William Chatterton	P	22	R	12	24	229	49	10.40	0
R P Smith	A	35	R	6	12	92	23	7.66	0
J Marlow		29	R	12	24	170	25	7.39	0
W Evershed	A	31	R	1	2	14	10	7.00	0
M Burrows		28	R	1	2	13	13	6.50	0
J T B D Platts	P	35	L	3	6	24	13	4.00	0
LG Wright	A	22	R	2	4	12	4	3.00	0
WL Shipton	A	23	R	1	2	4	3	2.00	0
JD Chatterton		17	R	1	2	0	0	0.00	0

A number of additional players appeared in the matches against Staffordshire. Apart from William Delacombe and Ralph Docker none of these players appeared in any first class matches for Derbyshire. These players were CC Marshall, Haydn Morley, WB Woodforde, A Jourdain, William Turnley, F C Newton, D Bostock, Johnstone and Giffard.

=== First-class bowling averages ===
Name	Hand	Balls	Runs	Wickets	BB	Average
W Cropper	L M	1603	606	34	6-46	17.82
J Marlow	R M	1795	679	34	7-46	19.97
William Chatterton	R Sl	1180	452	24	4-34	18.83
FJ Shacklock	R F	833	419	24	5-42	17.45
GG Walker	L F & Sl	1287	640	23	3-26	27.82
AHJ Cochrane	L M	284	148	8	6-51	18.50
Walter Sugg	R M	74	58	5	3-18	11.60
H Shaw	R round-arm M	60	26	4	4-26	6.50
LC Docker	R MF	138	70	2	1-0	35.00
J T B D Platts	R F	17	10	1	1-2	10.00
T Foster	R round-arm F	32	13	0		
WW Wood-Sims		36	10	0		
M Burrows	R round-arm F	16	10	0		
SH Evershed	RM	8	8	0		

=== Wicket keeping ===
- Thomas Mycroft Catches 23 Stumping 8

== Derby County Football Club ==
Derby County F.C. was formed in 1884 as an offshoot of the cricket club in an attempt to give players and supporters a winter interest as well as secure the cricket club extra revenue. The original intention was to name the club "Derbyshire County F.C." to highlight the link, though the Derbyshire FA, formed in 1883, objected on the grounds it was too long and therefore would not have been understood by the fans. Playing their home matches at the cricket club's Racecourse Ground, 1884/85 saw the club undertake an extensive programme of friendly matches, the first of which was a 6–0 defeat to Great Lever on 13 September 1884. The club's first competitive match came in the 1885 FA Cup, where they lost 7–0 at home to Walsall Town.

== See also ==
- Derbyshire County Cricket Club seasons
- 1884 English cricket season
- Imperfect season
