= Francis Dixon (cricketer) =

English cricketer and doctor

Personal information
- Full name: Francis Dixon
- Born: 2 November 1854; Heanor, Derbyshire, England
- Died: 20 August 1943 (aged 88); England
- Batting: Right-handed
- Bowling: Right=arm offbreak

Domestic team information
- Years: Team
- 1885: Derbyshire
- FC debut: 28 May 1885 Derbyshire v Surrey
- Last FC: 3 September 1891 Nottinghamshire XI v Gentlemen of England

Career statistics
Competition	First-class
Matches	2
Runs scored	23
Batting average	5.75
100s/50s	0/0
Top score	15
Balls bowled	10
Wickets	0
Bowling average	–
5 wickets in innings	–
10 wickets in match	–
Best bowling	–
Catches/stumpings	1/–
- Source: CricketArchive, February 2012

Francis Dixon (2 November 1854 – 20 August 1943) was an English medical doctor and cricketer who played for Derbyshire in 1885.

Dixon was born at Langley in Heanor, Derbyshire. He studied medicine in Edinburgh and Glasgow and qualified as LRCP and LRCSEd in 1878, and took the LSA in 1879. He was a doctor in practice at Eastwood, Nottinghamshire in 1881. He played his one and only game for Derbyshire in the 1885 season when the team lost to Surrey. He appeared subsequently in occasional games. He played two matches for Richard Daft's XI against Leicester in 1888 and 1889 and also played for Nottingham Castle. His second first-class match was in 1891, for Mordecai Sherwin's Nottinghamshire XI against the Gentlemen of England.

Dixon was a right-handed batsman and a right-arm off-break bowler

Dixon was medical officer of Health for Eastwood UDC and served on the committee of Nottinghamshire County Cricket Club for over 40 years.

Dixon died in Eastwood aged 88.
