= Yacoob Omar =

South African cricketer (born 1948)

Personal information
- Full name: Yacoob Omar
- Born: 7 August 1948 (age 78); Durban, Natal, Union of South Africa
- Batting: Right-handed
- Bowling: Right-arm medium
- Role: All-rounder

Domestic team information
- Years: Team
- 1971/72–1986/87: Natal

Career statistics
Competition	First-class	List A
Matches	67	1
Runs scored	3,742	0
Batting average	34.33	0.00
100s/50s	8/12	0/0
Top score	174*	0
Balls bowled	5,675	46
Wickets	101	0
Bowling average	19.81	–
5 wickets in innings	2	–
10 wickets in match	0	–
Best bowling	5/34	–
Catches/stumpings	51/–	0/–
- Source: CricketArchive, 17 April 2023

Yacoob Omar (born 7 August 1948) is a former South African first-class cricketer who played for Natal, mostly in Howa Bowl matches. He was born at Durban in 1948.

Omar holds the record for most runs scored in the Howa Bowl, which was known as the Dadabhay Trophy when he made a pair on first-class debut. He was also a decent right arm medium pace bowler.

In a tournament which was played on poor pitches that favoured the bowlers, Omar was one of the few players capable of making centuries and had a career best score of 174 not out, scored as captain against Eastern Province in 1975/76.
