= Stephen Doughty (cricketer) =

English cricketer (1855–1929)

Personal information
- Born: 16 October 1855; Staveley, Derbyshire, England
- Died: 11 November 1929 (aged 74); Skipton, England
- Batting: Right-handed
- Bowling: Right-arm off-break

Domestic team information
- Years: Team
- 1880–1886: Derbyshire
- FC debut: 7 June 1880 Derbyshire v MCC
- Last FC: 26 August 1886 Derbyshire v Yorkshire

Career statistics
Competition	First-class
Matches	4
Runs scored	40
Batting average	6.66
100s/50s	0/0
Top score	13*
Balls bowled	194
Wickets	4
Bowling average	19.75
5 wickets in innings	0
10 wickets in match	0
Best bowling	3/28
Catches/stumpings	1/–
- Source: CricketArchive, 12 February 2011

Stephen Doughty (16 October 1855 – 11 November 1929) was an English cricketer who played first-class cricket for Derbyshire in 1880 and 1886.

== Early life ==
Doughty was born at Staveley, Derbyshire and was originally a coal miner.

== Career ==
He made his debut for Derbyshire in June 1880 in a match against Marylebone Cricket Club (MCC) in which he took a wicket and a catch and made modest scores. He played two more matches in the 1880 season, when he made little impression. He reappeared in the 1886 season against Yorkshire when he took three wickets for 28 runs.

Doughty was a right-arm off-break, medium pace bowler and took 4 first-class wickets at an average of 19.75 and a best performance of 3 for 28. He was a right-hand batsman and played 7 innings in 4 matches with an average of 6.66 and a top score of 13 not out.

Doughty was a cricket coach. His protegees included Percy Holmes and Herbert Sutcliffe. He also umpired minor county matches mainly for Durham sides between 1912 and 1928.

== Personal life and demise ==
Doughty died at Halton East, Skipton, Yorkshire at age 74.
