= SACB (disambiguation) =

SACB may refer to:

- New Jersey State Athletic Control Board, state agency of New Jersey, United States
- Subversive Activities Control Board, United States federal committee (1950–1972)
- South African Cricket Board of Control, sports governing body in apartheid-era South Africa
