= Joseph Chatterton =

English cricketer

Personal information
- Full name: Joseph Deeley Chatterton
- Born: 14 February 1867; Thornsett, Derbyshire, England
- Died: 17 November 1886 (aged 19); Derby, England
- Batting: Right-handed
- Bowling: Right-arm slow
- Relatives: William Chatterton (brother)

Domestic team information
- Years: Team
- 1884–1886: Derbyshire
- FC debut: 28 July 1884 Derbyshire v Sussex
- Last FC: 26 August 1886 Derbyshire v Yorkshire

Career statistics
Competition	First-class
Matches	11
Runs scored	108
Batting average	5.40
100s/50s	0/0
Top score	21
Balls bowled	252
Wickets	5
Bowling average	23.80
5 wickets in innings	0
10 wickets in match	0
Best bowling	1/9
Catches/stumpings	3/–
- Source: CricketArchive, 29 August 2011

Joseph Deeley Chatterton (14 February 1867 – 17 November 1886) was an English cricketer who played for Derbyshire between 1884 and 1886.

Chatterton was born in Thornsett, the son of David Chatterton, a cotton mill fireman, and his wife Hannah.

Chatterton made his debut for Derbyshire in the 1884 season at the age of 17 against Sussex, when he made a duck in both innings. He played two matches in the 1885 season and in the 1886 season played eight first-class and two other matches for Derbyshire.

Chatterton was a right-handed batsman and played 22 innings in 11 first-class matches with an average of 5.40 and a top score of 21. He was a right-arm slow bowler and took 5 wickets for an average of 23.80.

Chatterton died in Derby at the age of 19 years. His brother, William, over five years his senior, was a former Derbyshire captain and one-time England Test cricketer.
