= Hemulal Yadav =

Indian cricketer

Domestic team information
- Years: Team
- 1996–1998: Tripura

Career statistics
Competition	First-class	List A
Matches	8	7
Runs scored	11	10
Batting average	1.37	10.00
100s/50s	0/0	0/0
Top score	5	7*
Balls bowled	1,586	333
Wickets	24	10
Bowling average	35.12	28.40
5 wickets in innings	1	0
10 wickets in match	0	0
Best bowling	7/80	3/39
Catches/stumpings	3/–	2/–
- Source: ESPNcricinfo, 1 June 2012

Hemulal Yadav is an Indian cricketer who played first-class cricket for Tripura. He is second batsman after South Africa's Andrew Jordaan in the history of first-class cricket to be given out timed out. He was dismissed in this rare fashion on 20 December 1997 in a Ranji Trophy match between Orissa and Tripura at Cuttack.
