= William Wood-Sims =

English cricketer

Personal information
- Full name: William Wood Wood-Sims
- Born: 11 February 1858; Ironville, Derbyshire, England
- Died: 30 November 1926 (aged 68); Lambeth, London, England
- Batting: Right-handed

Domestic team information
- Years: Team
- 1879–1886: Derbyshire
- FC debut: 14 July 1879 Derbyshire v Yorkshire
- Last FC: 14 June 1886 North v South

Career statistics
Competition	First-class
Matches	25
Runs scored	518
Batting average	12.04
100s/50s	0/0
Top score	46
Balls bowled	203
Wickets	5
Bowling average	14.00
5 wickets in innings	0
10 wickets in match	0
Best bowling	3/22
Catches/stumpings	13/–
- Source: CricketArchive, 25 January 2011

William Wood Wood-Sims (10 February 1858 – 30 November 1926) was an English cricketer who played first-class cricket for Derbyshire between 1879 and 1886.

Wood-Sims was born at Ironville, Derbyshire as William W Sims, the son of Joseph W Sims a boiler plate roller at an ironworks, and his wife Alice. Sims became a slater, and by 1881 was living with his parents at Alfreton. Later he changed his name to Wood-Sims. He played a game for Derbyshire in 1878 against a 16-man Uppingham team, but his first-class debut was in the 1879 season against Yorkshire in July. He then played one match in the 1880 season and one in the 1882 season before playing a fuller season in 1884. Also in 1884, he played one game for North against South. In the 1885 season he played 14 games for the club, some of which were not first-class. He played one game for Derbyshire in the 1886 season against MCC. He ended his first-class career playing for North against South when he was bowled for 4 by W. G. Grace, but took four wickets in return. In 1887 he played for a United XI against Scotland. His last appearance for Derbyshire was in the 1891 season when Derbyshire matches were not accorded first-class status.

Wood-Sims was a right-hand batsman and played 45 innings in 25 matches with an average of 12.04 and a top score of 46. He took five first-class wickets at an average of 14.00 and a best performance of 3 for 22. Wood-Sims opened frequently for Derbyshire, although he tended to score more highly when dropped down the order.

Wood-Sims died at Lambeth, London at the age of 68.
