= Faiek Davids =

South African cricketer (born 1964)

Cricket information
- Batting: Right-handed
- Bowling: Right-arm medium

Career statistics
Competition	First-class	List A
Matches	75	26
Runs scored	3,360	303
Batting average	30.54	21.64
100s/50s	5/19	0/1
Top score	146	55*
Balls bowled	5,331	434
Wickets	107	13
Bowling average	23.77	27.61
5 wickets in innings	0	0
10 wickets in match	0	0
Best bowling	5/50	3/23
Catches/stumpings	47/–	3/–
- Source: Cricinfo, 12 January 2023

Faiek Davids (born 1 September 1964) is a former South African first-class cricketer. A big hitting lower to middle order batsman, he played with Western Province and Boland during the 1990s, after earlier appearing in the Howa Bowl.
