= James Barnes (cricketer) =

English cricketer

Personal information
- Full name: James William Barnes
- Born: 14 August 1886; Sutton-in-Ashfield, Nottinghamshire, England
- Died: 9 September 1963 (aged 77); Mansfield, Nottinghamshire, England
- Bowling: Right-arm medium
- Relatives: Billy Barnes (father); Thomas Barnes (uncle)

Domestic team information
- Years: Team
- 1908–1910: Nottinghamshire

Career statistics
Competition	First-class
Matches	3
Runs scored	19
Batting average	3.80
100s/50s	0/0
Top score	12
Balls bowled	276
Wickets	2
Bowling average	52.50
5 wickets in innings	0
10 wickets in match	0
Best bowling	1/30
Catches/stumpings	0/–
- Source: Cricinfo, 2 March 2013

James William Barnes (14 August 1886 – 9 September 1963) was an English cricketer. Barnes' batting style is unknown, though it is known he bowled right-arm medium pace. He was born at Sutton-in-Ashfield, Nottinghamshire.

== Career ==
Barnes made his first-class debut for Nottinghamshire against the Gentlemen of Philadelphia in 1908 at Trent Bridge. The following season he made a single appearance in the County Championship against Essex, before making a third and final first-class appearance in the 1910 County Championship against Leicestershire. In his three first-class matches he scored a total of 19 runs with the bat at an average of 3.80 and a high score of 12. With the ball, he took 2 wickets at a bowling average of 52.50, with best figures of 1/30. He later coached cricket at Queen Elizabeth Grammar School, Mansfield.

His father Billy played Test cricket for England, while his uncle Thomas Barnes also played first-class cricket.

He died at Mansfield, Nottinghamshire on 9 September 1963.
