= 1886 English cricket season =

Cricket season review

The 1886 English cricket season was the 23rd since the legalisation of overarm bowling. Poor results caused the temporary relegation of both Hampshire and Somerset from first-class status. England beat Australia three-nil in the Test series. (Note: Some eleven-a-side matches played from 1772 to 1863 have been rated "first-class" by certain sources. However, the term only came into common use around 1864, when overarm bowling was legalised. It was formally defined as a standard by a meeting at Lord's, in May 1894, of Marylebone Cricket Club (MCC) and the county clubs which were then competing in the County Championship. The ruling was effective from the beginning of the 1895 season, but pre-1895 matches of the same standard have no official definition of status because the ruling is not retrospective. Matches of a similar standard since the beginning of the 1864 season are generally considered to have an unofficial first-class status. Pre-1864 matches which are included in the ACS' "Important Match Guide" may generally be regarded as top-class or, at least, historically significant. For further information, see First-class cricket.)

== Ashes tour ==
The Australians (referred to at the time as the "colonials") toured England for the fifth time and ninth test series in 1886; however their results did not equal those of previous tours. Of a total of thirty-nine games, they won only nine, lost eight and drew twenty-two, which is the second worst record by a touring Australian team after the 1890 team.

Their poor results, including the loss of all three Tests with the last two being lost by an innings, were due to the decline of the key players, such as Fred Spofforth and Eugene Palmer who had made the 1882 team so strong, along with the absence of their former captain Billy Murdoch who was later to settle in England and assist Sussex.

George Giffen headed both the batting and bowling averages for the tourists, and achieved the rare feat of twice taking sixteen wickets in a match during the season, with sixteen for 65 against Derbyshire and sixteen for 103 against Lancashire. No player was to again achieve the "double" of 1,000 runs and 100 wickets until Giffen returned to England in 1893.

Cumulative record - Test wins	1876–1886
England	11
Australia	9
Drawn	4

== Champion County ==
^{[a]}

- Nottinghamshire

=== Playing record (by county) ===
County	Played	Won	Lost	Drawn
Derbyshire	9	0	8	1
Gloucestershire	13	3	6	4
Kent	14	5	6	3
Lancashire	14	5	5	4
Middlesex	10	3	4	3
Nottinghamshire	14	7	0	7
Surrey	16	12	3	1
Sussex	12	4	6	2
Yorkshire	16	4	5	7

== Leading batsmen (qualification 20 innings) ==
1886 English season leading batsmen
Name	Team	Matches	Innings	Not outs	Runs	Highest score	Average	100s	50s
Arthur Shrewsbury	Nottinghamshire; England	24	38	5	1404	227 not out	42.54	3	8
Walter Read	Surrey; England	28	46	3	1825	120	42.44	4	12
WG Grace	Gloucestershire; Marylebone Cricket Club (MCC); England	33	55	3	1846	170	35.50	4	9
Maurice Read	Surrey; England	26	43	4	1364	186	34.97	2	7
Lord Harris	Kent	12	20	0	644	76	32.20	0	7

== Leading bowlers (qualification 1,000 balls) ==
1886 English season leading bowlers
Name	Team	Balls bowled	Runs conceded	Wickets taken	Average	Best bowling	5 wickets in innings	10 wickets in match
Alec Watson	Lancashire	4752	1109	100	11.09	7/15	8	3
Frederick Martin	Kent	1182	327	29	11.27	7/41	4	1
Tom Emmett	Yorkshire	5103	1591	124	12.83	7/33	10	2
William Attewell	Nottinghamshire	5094	1246	96	12.97	9/23	7	2
Thomas Bowley	Surrey	3899	1219	88	13.85	7/64	5	1

== Events ==
Somerset did not play any other first-class counties and dropped out of the Championship until 1891.

Hampshire ceased to be a first-class county after years of difficult circumstances and poor results. They did play matches against Surrey and Sussex in 1886 but these matches are not recognised as first-class. Hampshire did not recover first-class status until the beginning of the 1895 season when they were readmitted to the Championship.

George Ulyett achieved the unusual feat of scoring 1,000 runs with an average of under twenty, with 1,005 runs in 52 innings at an average of 19.78.

== Labels ==
^{a} An unofficial seasonal title sometimes proclaimed by consensus of media and historians prior to December 1889 when the official County Championship was constituted. Although there are ante-dated claims prior to 1873, when residence qualifications were introduced, it is only since that ruling that any quasi-official status can be ascribed.

== Bibliography ==
- ACS (1981). A Guide to Important Cricket Matches Played in the British Isles 1709–1863. Nottingham: ACS. OCLC 85045528.
- ACS (1982). A Guide to First-class Cricket Matches Played in the British Isles. Nottingham: ACS. OCLC 10586869.
- Warner, Pelham (1946). Lords: 1787–1945. London: Harrap. OCLC 877106024.

== Annual reviews ==
- James Lillywhite's Cricketers' Annual (Red Lilly), Lillywhite, 1887
- Wisden Cricketers' Almanack, 1887
