= Charles Horner (cricketer) =

English cricketer

Personal information
- Full name: Charles Edward Horner
- Born: 9 April 1857; Dulwich Common, London, England
- Died: 4 September 1925 (aged 68); Regent's Park, London, England
- Batting: Right-handed
- Bowling: Right-arm fast-medium
- Relatives: John Shuter (brother-in-law)

Domestic team information
- Years: Team
- 1877–1880: Oxford University
- 1882–1886: Surrey
- FC debut: 24 May 1877 Oxford Univ. v MCC
- Last FC: 19 July 1886 Surrey v Sussex

Career statistics
Competition	First-class
Matches	65
Runs scored	546
Batting average	7.58
100s/50s	0/0
Top score	37*
Balls bowled	12,191
Wickets	252
Bowling average	17.73
5 wickets in innings	15
10 wickets in match	3
Best bowling	8/35
Catches/stumpings	22/–
- Source: CricketArchive, February 2012

Charles Edward Horner (9 April 1857 – 4 September 1925) was an English cricketer who played first class cricket for Oxford University from 1877 to 1880 and for Surrey from 1882 to 1886.

== Life ==
Horner was born at Dulwich Common, London, the son of Edward Horner of Cheltenham. He matriculated at Brasenose College, Oxford on 14 October 1876. He played one match for Oxford University in 1877 against MCC. He played two matches for the university in 1879 and one in 1880, again against MCC.

In 1882 Horner made his debut for Surrey against Oxford University and played regularly until 1886. He took over 100 wickets in the 1884 season and made a notable last wicket stand against Kent in 1885. He also played for Gentlemen, Gentlemen of England, Gentlemen of the South, the South and EJ Sanders' XI.

Horner was a right-arm fast medium bowler and took 252 wickets at an average of 17.73 and a best performance of 8 for 35. He was a right-handed batsman and played 193 innings in 65 first class matches with an average of 7.58 and a top score of 37 not out. He was described as "A persevering bowler whom nothing perturbed, he could by the hour keep a length on or just outside the off stump".

Horner took part in the team touring North American in 1885 organised by Edward Sanders, that played the Philadelphian cricket team. He remained involved with Surrey for the rest of his life as a member of the committee and he attended the Oval or Lord's on most summer afternoons. He was also a keen billiards player and was associated with the Billiards Control Club in his later years.

Horner died at Gloucester Terrace, Regent's Park at the age of 68.
