= Timed out =

Rare method of dismissal in cricket

Timed out is a method of dismissal in the sport of cricket. It occurs when an incoming batter is not ready to play within a given amount of time of the previous batter being either dismissed or retired. This is one case of a 'diamond' or 'platinum' duck, as the player is out without having faced a ball. The purpose of the law is to ensure there are no unnecessary delays to the game. It is easily avoided, and it is very unusual for a batter to get out 'timed out'. As of June 2026, there have been no instances of this type of dismissal in Test cricket, a single instance each in One Day International, men and women's Twenty20 International cricket, and seven instances in first-class cricket.

== Background ==
"Timed Out" as a specific method of dismissal was added to the Laws in the 1980 code. It provided two minutes for the incoming batter to "step on to the field of play". In the 2000 code, this was revised to three minutes for the batter to "be in position to take guard or for his partner to be ready to receive the next ball". However, the first printed Laws of cricket, in 1775, already required the umpires "To allow Two Minutes for each Man to come in when one is out".

In 1919, Sussex cricketer Harold Heygate was given out by the umpire Alfred Street as "timed out" in a first-class County Championship match with Somerset at Taunton. MCC, then in charge of the Laws, later ruled that the umpire was correct in ending the Sussex innings when Heygate failed to appear within two minutes, but that the batter should be marked as "absent", which is how it appears in the 1920 edition of Wisden Cricketers' Almanack. Under present rules, Heygate would have been recorded as "absent hurt", and this is how his innings is now recorded in CricketArchive. The match ended in a tie.

== Current Law ==
Law 40 of the Laws of Cricket provides that an incoming batter must be in position to receive the ball or for their partner to be ready to receive the next ball within a given amount of time of the fall of the previous wicket or the previous batsman retiring. If not, the incoming batter will be given out, timed out, on appeal.

The amount of time given for the incoming batter to be ready varies depending on the match playing conditions. The default period of time defined in Law 40 is 3 minutes, but this is amended to 2 minutes for Test cricket and one day international cricket. Twenty20 cricket shortens the period of time even further to 90 seconds, and an on-field dugout is often provided in this format (in a similar manner to some other team sports such as association football and rugby) to enable incoming batters to make their way to the wicket immediately when a wicket falls to avoid being timed out. The umpires cannot rule on any appeal for timed out until someone takes the field of play.

The "incoming batter" may be any batter who has not yet batted. There is no prescribed batting order in cricket, i.e. the team does not have to come out to bat in any specific order even if one has been published. Until one batter has set foot on the field the batting captain may pick any player who has not yet batted who, when they appear on the field, may then be given out on appeal. Knowing that a better batter will shortly be able to take the field, the captain can therefore sacrifice onto the field their worst remaining batter (colloquially the "No. 11") or one who is present injured, even one who previously retired hurt.

Whether or not an appeal for timed out is made, if the delay in which no batter comes to the wicket extends beyond the prescribed minutes, an "extended delay" is judged and the umpires follow the procedure in Law 16.3 with a view to award the match to the opposing team. They will discuss the situation together, make contact with the Captain of the team who are refusing to play and can award the game to the bowling side.

If no remaining not out players are able to take the field (e.g. through absence, injury or illness, or suspension or ejection as a result of a players' conduct offence) then none is given out timed out; instead the innings is to be considered as completed and "absent ill/injured/hurt" (or retired in the event of a players' conduct offence) is noted next to all remaining players' names as appropriate.

== Dismissals ==
=== Test cricket matches ===
No batter has been dismissed timed out in Test cricket as of November 2023, but there are some notable incidents where a batter could have potentially been dismissed in this manner:

1. During the third Test at Cape Town's Newlands Cricket Ground of the 2006–2007 series between India and South Africa, India quickly lost two opening batters at the start of their second innings. Sachin Tendulkar was listed as the fourth batter, but as he had been replaced as a fielder for 18 minutes at the end of South Africa's first innings, he was ineligible to bat in India's second innings until another 18 minutes had expired from its commencement. After confusion in the Indian dressing room about Tendulkar's ineligibility resulting in a six-minute delay, Sourav Ganguly came in as the next batter. South African captain Graeme Smith did not appeal for a "timed out" dismissal of the incoming batter as the Umpires had told him it would not be entertained due to confusing information given by the match referee regarding Tendulkar's short suspension, and Ganguly was allowed to commence his innings.
2. During the second Test in the 2023 Ashes series, Australian player Nathan Lyon suffered a severe calf injury while fielding that prevented him from moving at a normal pace. During the Australian second innings he decided to take his place as the final batter and to avoid the potential for England to appeal and have him dismissed by a time out, Lyon moved closer to the field than the Australian players pavilion so he could hobble onto the ground within the time limit. He avoided being timed out, scoring 4 runs before he was dismissed.

=== One Day International cricket ===
The first batter in One Day International cricket (or indeed in any form of international cricket) to be timed out was Angelo Mathews in a group stage match against Bangladesh during the 2023 Cricket World Cup. Mathews was making his way to the crease after the dismissal of Sadeera Samarawickrama when his helmet strap broke and he sought a replacement helmet on the edge of the field before being ready to face the next ball, with the time taken between Samarawikrama's dismissal and Mathews' readiness to face the next ball consequently exceeding the 2 minutes permitted under the tournament playing conditions. Subsequently, Bangladesh captain Shakib Al Hasan appealed for timed out, which was upheld by the on-field umpires Richard Illingworth and Marais Erasmus. Despite Mathews' protestations, Shakib refused to withdraw the appeal. The dismissal generated controversy, with some praising and others criticising Shakib for his actions. It later emerged that Mathews would not have been ready to face the next ball in time even had his helmet strap not broken, and that he had been warned by the umpires about the possibility of being timed out before the helmet malfunction.

| No. | Player | Team | Opposition | Venue | Competition | Date | Result |
|---|---|---|---|---|---|---|---|
| 1 | Angelo Mathews | Sri Lanka | Bangladesh | Arun Jaitley Stadium, Delhi, India | 38th Match, 2023 Cricket World Cup | 6 November 2023 | Lost |
| 1 | Mathews was making his way to the crease following the dismissal of Sadeera Samarawickrama when his helmet strap broke, exchanging his helmet on the boundary before proceeding. The resulting delay meant that Mathews failed to be ready to receive the next ball in time, however he still would not have been ready in time even without the helmet malfunction. | | | | | | |

=== Twenty20 International cricket ===
The first batter in Twenty20 International cricket to be out timed out was Ghana's Godfred Bakiweyem against Sierra Leone in the 2023 Africa Cricket Association Africa T20 Cup, occurring only a month after the aforementioned Mathews dismissal in One Day International cricket. Notably, Bakiweyem was involved in another unusual dismissal earlier in the same match when Sierra Leone's Abass Gbla made intentional contact with Bakiweyem while Bakiweyem was attempting to run Gbla out, resulting in Gbla being given out obstructing the field.

Bhutan's Ritschi Choden became the first batter to be timed out in a women's T20 International match in June 2026, after taking too long to reach her crease in a match against Nepal at the ACC Women's Premier Cup.

| No. | Player | Team | Opposition | Venue | Competition | Date | Result |
|---|---|---|---|---|---|---|---|
| 1 | Godfred Bakiweyem | Ghana | Sierra Leone | Willowmoore Park, Benoni, South Africa | 12th Match, 2023 Africa Cricket Association Cup | 17 December 2023 | Won |
| 1 | Following the dismissal of Samson Awiah, Bakiweyem was uncertain as to whether he was next to bat, the resulting delay meaning that he failed to be ready to receive the next ball in time. | | | | | | |

=== First-class cricket ===
| No. | Player | Team | Opposition | Venue | Competition | Date | Result |
|---|---|---|---|---|---|---|---|
| 1 (Note: This match was only recognised by Wisden as a first-class match in 2006, when matches played by non-white South Africans in the apartheid era were included in the record. Hence, earlier lists do not contain this instance.) | Andrew Jordaan | Eastern Province | Transvaal | Adcock Stadium, Port Elizabeth, South Africa | 1987–88 Howa Bowl | 20 February 1988 | Drawn |
| 1 | Jordaan was due to open the batting but was prevented from reaching the ground due to flooded roads following an overnight downpour. | | | | | | |
| 2 | Hemulal Yadav | Tripura | Orissa | Barabati Stadium, Cuttack, India | 1997–98 Ranji Trophy | 17 December 1997 | Drawn |
| 2 | Yadav was in conversation with his team manager on the boundary at the fall of the 9th wicket, and made no attempt to reach the crease. | | | | | | |
| 3 | Vasbert Drakes | Border | Free State | Buffalo Park, East London, South Africa | 2002–03 SuperSport Series | 27 September 2002 | Lost |
| 3 | Drakes had been playing for West Indies in the Champions Trophy and was included in Border's team under the assumption that he would arrive on time. His flight from Colombo was delayed and he had not yet arrived at the ground when he was due to bat. | | | | | | |
| 4 | Andrew Harris | Nottinghamshire | Durham UCCE | Trent Bridge, Nottingham, England | 2003 University Centres of Cricketing Excellence | 12 April 2003 | Won |
| 4 | Harris had strained a groin muscle and was not initially expecting to bat, but later decided to bat as Chris Read was nearing a century but was running out of batting partners. He was not yet ready to bat at the fall of the 9th wicket and was still making his way to the field when time elapsed, stranding Read on 94 not out. | | | | | | |
| 5 | Ryan Austin | Combined Campuses and Colleges | Windward Islands | Arnos Vale Ground, Kingstown, Saint Vincent and the Grenadines | 2013–14 Regional Four Day Competition | 4 April 2014 | Won |
| 5 | Austin was the last nominated batter and failed to be ready to receive the next ball in time. Despite this, he won the Player of the Match award due to his career-best bowling of 11–101 contributing towards an 82-run win. | | | | | | |
| 6 | Charles Kunje | Matabeleland Tuskers | Mountaineers | Queens Sports Club, Bulawayo, Zimbabwe | 2017–18 Logan Cup | 3 December 2017 | Lost |
| 6 | After Matabeleland Tuskers lost 3 wickets in 6 balls, Kunje was unprepared to bat and failed to be ready to receive the next ball in time. | | | | | | |
| 7 | Saud Shakeel | State Bank of Pakistan | Pakistan Television | Rawalpindi Cricket Stadium, Rawalpindi, Pakistan | Final, 2024–25 President's Trophy | 4 March 2025 | Lost |
| 7 | After State Bank of Pakistan lost 2 wickets in 2 balls, Shakeel was unprepared to bat and failed to be ready to receive the next ball in time. | | | | | | |

== See also ==
- List of unusual dismissals in international cricket
