= Khaya Majola (cricketer) =

South African cricketer and administrator

Personal information
- Full name: Khaya Majola
- Born: 17 May 1953; Port Elizabeth, Cape Province, Union of South Africa
- Died: 28 August 2000 (aged 47); Johannesburg, Gauteng, South Africa
- Batting: Left-handed
- Bowling: Left-arm orthodox spin

Domestic team information
- Years: Team
- 1973–1991: Eastern Province

Career statistics
| Competition | First-class |
|---|---|
| Matches | 87 |
| Runs scored | 2,826 |
| Batting average | 20.77 |
| 100s/50s | 0/12 |
| Top score | 80 |
| Balls bowled | 9,792 |
| Wickets | 219 |
| Bowling average | 16.64 |
| 5 wickets in innings | 11 |
| 10 wickets in match | 0 |
| Best bowling | 8/96 |
| Catches/stumpings | 72/– |
- Source: ESPNcricinfo, 19 April 2019

Khaya Majola (17 May 1953 – 28 August 2000) was a South African cricket player and administrator. A black African, (Note: During apartheid, non-whites were classified as "Africans", "Indians" and "Coloureds". The term "black" was used collectively to describe people from any of these groups. "Africans" were defined as people indigenous to Africa.) Majola played cricket during the apartheid-era in South Africa. Early in his playing career, he was given opportunities by the South African African Cricket Board (SAACB) to play alongside white players in exhibition matches, and to play overseas in England. He soon rejected further offers from the SAACB, feeling that the matches were token gestures, and that they were using black players as tools to overturn the sporting boycott of apartheid South Africa, and enable the national team, consisting solely of white players, to be re-admitted into international cricket. This decision meant that Majola played almost all of his cricket in the Howa Bowl between 1973 and 1991, a non-racial tournament organised by the South African Cricket Board of Control (SACBOC), who supported the boycott. Matches were typically played on matting wickets in poor conditions; they were not considered to be of first-class status at the time, but were subsequently added to the records.

Majola was one of the leading players in the Howa Bowl; he played in more matches than any other player, scored the second-most runs, and took the fifth-most wickets. Although he described himself as a cricketer, not a politician, he continued to campaign against the tokenism of black cricketers, and lobbied against the rebel tours of South Africa. Both apartheid and the sporting boycott formally ended in 1991, and the same year, Majola joined the United Cricket Board upon its foundation. As the director of amateur cricket, he was responsible for setting up a national development programme, and sought to create pathways for black Africans to be able to play cricket at every level of the game. He died of colon cancer, aged 47, in 2000.

== Early life ==
Khaya Majola was born on 17 May 1953 in the New Brighton township in Port Elizabeth, Union of South Africa, the eldest of five children of Eric and Milase Majola. His family were black Africans in apartheid South Africa; his father was of Zulu descent, while his mother had mixed heritage; Scottish and Sotho. Both his parents worked as teachers, and were heavily involved in sports; Eric played for the national African team in rugby and cricket, and they were strong believers in the community and character-forming benefits of sport for their children. Milase recalled Khaya playing cricket with his father as a toddler; "Khaya would walk out the front door with this bat that was bigger than him." Although Khaya's brothers played a variety of sports, particularly association football, Khaya's father kept him focused on cricket. He was viewed as the most talented of the Majola children, and the family would sometimes rise at 5 am to bowl at Khaya. As a pre-teen, Khaya occasionally played for his father's New Brighton Cricket Club when they were short of players.

Majola first attended Jarvis Gqamlana Lower, and then Johnson Marwanqa Higher primary schools; neither had significant sport schemes, and Majola continued to primarily develop his cricketing ability at home with his family. By the age of 11, he was already described by the Evening Post as "a star in Port Elizabeth"; by his teenage years his performances were noteworthy more weeks than not. He attended Cowan High School, where they played an inter-school cricket schedule against five other schools. Khaya recalled that during his time at Cowan, most weeks he was "scoring a fifty or taking wickets," playing for both school and club. Despite his talent and success, Khaya developed a dislike for the game, partly due to the strictness of his father with regards to his development.

Despite his antipathy towards cricket, Majola continued to thrive and took part in the John Passmore schools week, for black Africans, in 1971. Majola represented Eastern Province, who won the tournament, but he reflected on the competition as being of a poor standard, saying that "some of the guys couldn't even play the game." This view was mirrored by Passmore, who admitted that some of the players "had no idea about cricket." Majola was subsequently selected for the South African Schools XI. He was once again part of the victorious team at the Passmore tournament in 1972, and was the only batsman to score two centuries.

== Cricketer in apartheid South Africa ==
=== Opportunities due to multinationalism ===
In late 1973, Majola was chosen to play for the South Africa African XI against Derrick Robins touring side, which included England Test players. The match was an exhibition, and part of the South African government's policy of multinationalism, in which black and white sportspeople could compete against each other, representing their own 'nation'. Although the match was given "big-billing in the media", it resulted in an easy victory for the touring side, in a single-innings match. Majola took two wickets, and scored seven runs in the match, in which he was selected as his side's primary all-rounder. In later life, Majola described the game as "clearly a show for the government and the white cricket board." Nevertheless, Majola was praised in the press, and was invited by Robins to return to England with him to appear for his side during the English summer.

Before he left for England, Majola made two appearances in what became known as the Howa Bowl. These matches have retrospectively been granted first-class cricket status, and so officially, he made his first-class debut for Eastern Province against Natal in February 1974. He scored three runs in the first innings and none in the second, and took two wickets in the second innings, after not bowling in the first. He left for England in mid-1974, his departure heralded by the South African African Cricket Board (SAACB) as "the first African to play overseas." Majola spent three weeks in England, and played matches against a variety of sides, including the English counties' second elevens and both Cambridge and Oxford University cricket clubs.

=== Rejection of tokenism ===
When he returned from England, Majola rejected further opportunities offered to him by the SAACB, including playing in the "Double-Wicket Competition", a gimmick which featured both black and white players, and was marketed as the return of "international cricket". According to the sports journalist Chris Barron, Majola believed that black players were "being used as stooges to boost the chances of white South Africans playing international cricket again". Although the black players were allowed to play alongside and against white players in games promoted by the SAACB, the Group Areas Act still heavily restricted their lives off the field, and they often were not served drinks at the cricket clubs the matches were played at. Instead, Majola backed the South African Cricket Board of Control (SACBOC) who supported the sporting boycott of apartheid South Africa, and championed non-racial policies. The move from SAACB to SACBOC prevented Majola from potentially achieving international recognition; as did his decision to remain in South Africa. Basil D'Oliveira, a Cape Coloured South African who had emigrated to England in the 1960s and played over forty times for England in international cricket, suggested that if Majola had moved to England, he could have become a "superstar".

Howa Bowl matches were typically played on poor pitches featuring matting wickets, which were not conducive to batting. Cricket administrators sought to justify this to an extent by suggesting that non-white Africans were not interested in cricket. Majola played in more Howa Bowl matches than any other player, and representing Eastern Province, was among the top-five players by both runs scored and wickets taken. He became captain in the 1986–87 season, after twelve seasons as vice-captain. He never scored a century in the competition, but made twelve half-centuries, with a highest score of 80. He claimed 219 wickets at an average of 16.64, eleven times taking five or more wickets in an innings. Statistically, his best batting season was 1987–88, when he scored 437 runs at an average of 36.41 and scored three of his half-centuries. His made his highest score in January 1988, when he scored 80 runs in a drawn match against Natal. He was more heavily used as a bowler from 1983 onwards, under the captaincy of Jeff Frans, and achieved his best bowling performance in January 1985 when he took eight wickets for 96 in the third innings against Western Province to help his side to a five wickets victory. He was one of only three players to both score 2,000 runs and taken 200 wickets in the Howa Bowl, along with Mustapha Khan and Seraj Gabriels.

=== Campaigner for non-racial sport ===
Majola trained as a teacher at Lovedale, and later worked at his former primary school, Johnson Marwanqa in New Brighton, where he took the position previously held by his father. He taught until 1977, when he joined the local Bantu Affairs Administration Board as a recreation officer. According to the South African historian André Odendaal, these boards were "hated symbols of apartheid authority", and he suggested that working for the board seemed a contradiction to Majola's support for non-racial sport. Majola disagreed, saying that the role allowed him to organise and provide facilities for non-racial sport to continue and thrive that he would not otherwise have been able to. He was involved in every aspect of non-racial sport in the townships; in his own words, he was "organising practices, getting the grounds ready, coaching and picking teams to fetching players and playing."

Although Majola shied away from describing himself as a political activist, he continued to support, and campaign for, non-racial sport through the 1980s. In 1976, the authorities governing cricket in South Africa merged to become the South African Cricket Union (SACU) with the stated aim that cricket in South Africa would be played on an integrated basis regardless of race or colour. Although the leadership of SACBOC approved the merger, Majola, along with the majority of black cricketers opposed the move, committed to the ethos of "no normal sport in an abnormal society". This group formed the South African Cricket Board (SACB), which continued to run the Howa Bowl, supported the sporting boycott and non-sporting liberation efforts, and affiliated with the non-racial South African Council on Sport. The SACU ran outreach programmes for the townships, aimed at black cricketers, but Majola suspected that the initiative was more of the same propaganda, designed more to impress the international community – and therefore potentially pave the way for South Africa to return to playing international Test cricket – than to genuinely develop black cricket. He did all he could to oppose SACU's efforts, bringing him into direct conflict with Ali Bacher, one of SACU's leaders. Majola and Bacher clashed throughout the 1980s: Bacher helped to organise six rebel tours of South Africa; Majola campaigned against them, helping to organise such opposition to the 1990 tour of Mike Gatting's England side that it was cancelled. In 1989, Majola said: "He [Bacher] hates me now."

== Post-apartheid administrator ==
In February 1990, the South African government was forced to unban the African National Congress (ANC). As part of the ANC's efforts to unify South Africa, they encouraged the SACU and SACB to merge. Talks between the two organisations began in August 1990, and four months later they announced their intention to unite. During this interim period, SACB announced that Majola would work with Ali Bacher on a "national development project", starting in February 1991. The following month, Majola played his final Howa Bowl (and first-class) match.

According to Barron, in Majola's position as Director of Amateur Cricket, he gave credibility to the new United Cricket Board of South Africa's (UCB) efforts to transform South African cricket and bring more black players into the game. The programme introduced over 20,000 children to the sport each year, and Majola was proud that in the 1998–99 season, over 10% of the players in provincial cricket were black. Despite his pride, there were criticisms that transformation was taking too long, though these were assuaged somewhat in the late 1990s. Majola died of colon cancer on 28 August 2000.

== Sources ==
=== Books ===
- Booth, Douglas (2005) [1998]. The Race Game: Sport and Politics in South Africa. London: Frank Cass. ISBN 0-7146-4354-8.
- Engel, Matthew; Samson, Andrew (2006). "Setting the records straight". In Engel, Matthew (ed.). Wisden Cricketers' Almanack 2006 (143 ed.). Alton, Hampshire: John Wisden & Co. pp. 79–80. ISBN 0-947766-98-7.
- Marqusee, Mike (2016) [1994]. Anyone but England: Cricket, Race and Class. London: Bloomsbury Caravel. ISBN 978-1-4482-1669-7.
- McCallum, Kevin; O'Sullivan, David (2010). The Extraordinary Book of South African Cricket. Johannesburg: Penguin Books. ISBN 978-0-14-352789-3.
- Odendaal, André (2003). The Story of an African Game. Cape Town: David Philip. ISBN 978-0-8648-6638-7.
- Odendaal, André; Reddy, Krish; Samson, Andrew (2012). The Blue Book: A History of Western Province Cricket, 1890–2011. Johannesburg: Fanele. ISBN 978-1-920196-47-9.
- Williams, Jack (2001). Cricket and Race. Oxford: Berg Publishers. ISBN 978-1-85973-309-7.
- Wright, Graeme, ed. (2001). "Obituary". Wisden Cricketers' Almanack 2001 (138 ed.). Alton, Hampshire: John Wisden & Co. Ltd. pp. 1570–1612. ISBN 0-947-76663-4.

=== Journals ===
- Booth, Douglas (2017). "Disentangling Race: Re-Narrating Apartheid Sport?". The International Journal of the History of Sport. 33 (15): 1866–1883. doi:10.1080/09523367.2017.1319359. ISSN 1743-9035. S2CID 148860280.
- Merrett, Christopher (2001). "Aurora: The Challenge of Non-Racial Cricket to the Apartheid State of the mid-1970s". The International Journal of the History of Sport. 18 (4): 95–122. doi:10.1080/714001669. ISSN 1743-9035. S2CID 144865760.
- Vahed, Goolam (2003). "Taking up the White Man's Game: the Rise and Decline of African Cricket in Durban, 1930–1960". Historia. 48 (2): 111–126. hdl:10520/EJC38121.

=== News ===
- Alfred, Luke (1 September 2015). "Would it have been different with Khaya Majola around?". Cricinfo. ESPN Inc..
- Barron, Chris (3 September 2000). "Khaya Majola set ball rolling in townships". Sunday Times. Johannesburg.
- Jackson, Russell (7 June 2014). "The other rebels". ESPNcricinfo. ESPN Inc..
- Odendaal, André (29 August 2000). "Majola leaves huge legacy". Cricinfo. ESPN Inc..
