= Rashaad Magiet =

South African cricketer (born 1979)

Personal information
- Born: 30 May 1979 (age 47); Cape Town, South Africa
- Relatives: Saait Magiet (uncle)
- Source: Cricinfo, 1 December 2020

Rashaad Magiet (born 30 May 1979) is a South African cricketer. He played in 23 first-class and 8 List A matches from 1998 to 2008.
