= Sadie Forman =

South African teacher, librarian and anti-apartheid activist

Sadie Forman (1929 – 11 December 2014) was a South African teacher, librarian and anti-apartheid activist.

== Early life ==
Sadie Kreel was from Johannesburg, the daughter of writer Bunim-Idel Krill, a Jewish immigrant from Rokiškis, Lithuania. Her father was a Yiddish-language poet and writer.

== Career ==
Sadie Forman and her husband Lionel were active members of the South African Communist Party. Lionel was arrested for treason in 1956. As his wife, Sadie was under severe restrictions: under her banning order, she was not allowed to go far from her house, or to enter factories or schools, or work around other people. She made a living as a proofreader during this time.

In 1969 she was granted an exit permit and left South Africa with her three children. She worked as a teacher in London. In 1996 she returned to live in South Africa, settling in Fort Hare, where she volunteered in the library at the University of Fort Hare, archiving the papers of the African National Congress. In 2012, the university recognized her contribution with an honorary doctorate.

She co-edited an edition of her husband's writings with André Odendaal, published in 1992. She also wrote a biography of her husband, Lionel Forman: A Life Too Short (2008).

== Personal life ==
Sadie married Lionel Forman, a fellow child of Jewish immigrants, in 1952. They had three children, Karl, Frank and Sara, born before Lionel died in 1959, aged 32 years, from complications following a heart surgery performed by Christiaan Barnard. In 2007 she moved to London for her health, and to be near her children. Sadie Forman died in 2014, aged 85 years, in England.
