= Vincent Barnes =

South African cricketer

Personal information
- Full name: Vincent Alexander Barnes
- Born: 15 February 1960 (age 66); Cape Town, Cape Province, Union of South Africa
- Batting: Right-handed
- Bowling: Right-arm fast-medium
- Role: Bowler

Domestic team information
- Years: Team
- 1978/79–1994/95: Western Province
- 1985/86: Transvaal

Career statistics
Competition	First-class	List A
Matches	68	5
Runs scored	423	–
Batting average	9.83	–
100s/50s	0/0	–
Top score	41*	–
Balls bowled	11,481	246
Wickets	323	10
Bowling average	11.95	16.70
5 wickets in innings	24	0
10 wickets in match	6	0
Best bowling	9/46	3/18
Catches/stumpings	45/–	2/–
- Source: CricketArchive, 22 April 2023

Vincent Alexander Barnes (born 15 February 1960) is a former South African first-class cricketer who played for Western Province and Transvaal. He was born at Cape Town in 1960.

Barnes, a coloured fast bowler with a slingy action, played most of his cricket during the apartheid years which meant he was confined to the Howa Bowl. The Western Province paceman was the competition's most successful bowler and topped the wicket-taking lists with 41 wickets at 7.75 in 1982–83 and 42 wickets at 10.14 in 1986–87. Barnes also spent a season at Transvaal in 1985–86 and was one of three bowlers to finish with a competition high 36 scalps. He took his career best figures of 9 for 46 in the second innings of a match against Natal in 1983–84.

Following his retirement from cricket, Barnes became a coach and was in charge of South Africa's Under-19s from 1997 to 1999. He was then appointed as the coach of South Africa A before joining the national team as an assistant coach to Mickey Arthur.
