= André Odendaal =

South African historian and cricketer

Personal information
- Born: 4 May 1954 (age 72); Queenstown, Cape Province, South Africa
- Batting: Right-handed
- Bowling: Right-arm off-spin
- Role: Batsman

Domestic team information
- Years: Team
- 1980, 1983: Cambridge University
- 1981–82: Boland
- 1984–85: Transvaal SACB team
- 1985–86: Western Province SACB team

Career statistics
Competition	First-class	List A
Matches	26	5
Runs scored	778	167
Batting average	18.97	33.40
100s/50s	0/1	0/1
Top score	61	74
Balls bowled	72	–
Wickets	0	–
Bowling average	–	–
5 wickets in innings	–	–
10 wickets in match	–	–
Best bowling	–	–
Catches/stumpings	23/–	1/–
- Source: CricketArchive, 5 September 2014

André Odendaal (born 4 May 1954) is a South African historian and former first-class cricketer.

== Education ==
Odendaal attended Queen's College in Queenstown, Stellenbosch University, and St John's College, Cambridge, where he gained a PhD in History.

== Cricket career ==
Odendaal played for Cambridge University in 1980 and 1983, scoring 61, his only first-class fifty, on debut against Leicestershire. He played nine matches in 1980, scoring 325 runs at an average of 23.21. He played in the annual match against Oxford University, but rain washed out the match before Cambridge could bat. He also played two List A matches for Combined Universities. On his debut he scored 74 against Warwickshire and won the Man of the match award.

He played ten matches for Boland in 1980–81 and 1981–82, but with only moderate personal success, although he played in the team that won the SAB Bowl in 1981–82.

In 1984–85 Odendaal became the only white first-class player to play in the non-white South African first-class competition during the apartheid era, appearing for the Transvaal team in 1984–85 and the Western Province team in 1985–86.

After the end of apartheid Odendaal served as CEO at Newlands Cricket Ground in Cape Town and CEO of the Cape Cobras and Western Province cricket teams for ten years. He chaired the UCBSA's Transformation Monitoring Committee from 1998 to 2002. In 2002 he received the President's Award for Sport (Silver Class) for his contribution to bringing about change in sport.

== Career as a historian ==
Odendaal has taught history at the University of South Africa and at the University of the Western Cape, where he is an Honorary Professor in History and Heritage Studies. He was founding director of the Mayibuye Centre for History and Culture in 1991 and the Robben Island Museum in 1997.

His books include:

- God's Forgotten Cricketers: Profiles of Leading South African Players (1976) (ed)
- Cricket in Isolation: The Politics of Race and Cricket in South Africa (1977)
- Vukani Bantu!: The Beginnings of Black Protest Politics in South Africa (1984)
- Beyond the Barricades: Popular Resistance in South Africa in the 1980's (1989) (contributed main essay)
- A Trumpet from the Housetops: The Selected Writings of Lionel Forman (1992) (ed, with Sadie Forman)
- Liberation Chabalala: The World of Alex la Guma (1993) (ed, with Roger Field)
- Beyond the Tryline: Rugby and South African Society (1995) (with Albert Grundlingh and Burridge Spies)
- The Story of an African Game: Black Cricketers and the Unmasking of One of South Africa's Greatest Myths, 1850–2003 (2003)
- The Blue Book: A History of Western Province Cricket 1890–2011 (2012) (with Krish Reddy and Andrew Samson)
- The Founders: The Origins of the African National Congress and the Struggle for Democracy (2012)
- Cricket and Conquest: The History of South African Cricket Retold: Volume 1, 1795–1914 (2016) (with Krish Reddy, Christopher Merrett and Jonty Winch)
- Divided Country: The History of South African Cricket Retold: Volume 2, 1914–1960 (2018) (with Krish Reddy and Christopher Merrett)
- Pitch Battles: Sport, Racism and Resistance (2021) (with Peter Hain)
- Swallows and Hawke: England's Cricket Tours, MCC and the Making of South Africa 1888–1968 (2022) (with Richard Parry)
- Dear Comrade President: Oliver Tambo and the Foundations of South Africa's Constitution (2022)
