= Thomas Bowley =

English cricketer

Personal information
- Born: 28 February 1857; Old Basford, Nottinghamshire, England
- Died: 8 November 1939 (aged 82); Sherborne, Dorset, England
- Batting: Right-handed
- Bowling: Right-arm fast

Domestic team information
- Years: Team
- 1897–1902: Dorset
- 1885–1891: Surrey
- FC debut: 14 May 1885 Surrey v Hampshire
- Last FC: 21 May 1891 Surrey v Lancashire

Career statistics
Competition	First-class
Matches	83
Runs scored	730
Batting average	8.58
100s/50s	0/0
Top score	46
Balls bowled	13,158
Wickets	264
Bowling average	16.82
5 wickets in innings	9
10 wickets in match	1
Best bowling	7/64
Catches/stumpings	42/–
- Source: CricketArchive, 16 February 2012

Thomas Bowley (28 February 1857 — 8 November 1939) was an English first-class cricketer who played for Surrey from 1885 to 1891.

Bowley was born in Old Basford, Nottinghamshire. He began playing for Nottinghamshire in 1879 and for Northamptonshire from 1880. In 1884, against Essex, he took all the wickets for Northamptonshire apart from one run out in the first innings. He made his first-class debut for Surrey in 1885 and became a formidable member of the Surrey attack with George Lohmann and Jack Beaumont. Bowley had a hand in changing the rules of cricket to allow declaration. In a match between Surrey and Sussex in 1887, Surrey had set up a big lead and wanted to have a go at Sussex on a deteriorating pitch while Sussex wanted to hang on for a draw. Bowley, last man in, tried to get stumped but the wicketkeeper refused, and Sussex prolonged the innings by sending down a succession of no-balls. Eventually, Bowley kicked down his own stumps. However enough time had been lost to let Sussex hold the draw.

One of Bowley's best bowling performances was in 1889 when he took six Derbyshire wickets for 13 runs at Derby. In his first class career, he also played for the North, Players of the South and CI Thornton's XI. He was an umpire for North v South and Players v Gentlemen between 1883 and 1893.

Bowley was right-arm fast bowler and took 264 first-class wickets at an average of 16.82 and a best performance of 7 for 64. He was a right-handed batsman and played 111 innings in 83 first-class matches at an average of 8.58 and a top score of 46.

In 1894, Bowley was appointed cricket coach at Sherborne School and held the position for seventeen years. He also played for Dorset for several years. Bowley also played for Dorset in the Minor Counties Championship from 1897 to 1902.

Bowley died in Sherborne, Dorset at the age of 82.
