= Herbert Armstrong (cricketer) =

English cricketer

Personal information
- Full name: Herbert Horace Armstrong
- Born: 25 October 1862; Islington, Middlesex, England
- Died: Q1 1942 (aged 79); Bournemouth, Hampshire, England
- Batting: Right-handed
- Bowling: Right-arm medium

Domestic team information
- Years: Team
- 1882–1885: Hampshire

Career statistics
Competition	First-class
Matches	23
Runs scored	502
Batting average	14.34
100s/50s	–/2
Top score	68
Balls bowled	3,713
Wickets	68
Bowling average	20.23
5 wickets in innings	2
10 wickets in match	–
Best bowling	7/33
Catches/stumpings	10/–
- Source: Cricinfo, 10 December 2009

Herbert Horace Armstrong (25 October 1862 – 1942) was an English first-class cricketer.

Armstrong was born in October 1862 at Islington to John Armstrong, a salesman, and his wife, Jane. Moving to Southampton in 1881, he began playing club cricket for Southampton, where he was noted as being one of the club's best batsmen. Armstrong began playing for Hampshire County Cricket Club in 1882, making his debut in first-class cricket against the Marylebone Cricket Club at Southampton. An all-rounder, he played first-class cricket for Hampshire until the county lost its first-class status in 1885, having made 23 appearances. In these, he scored 502 runs at an average of 14.34, with a highest score of 68. With his right-arm medium pace bowling, he took 68 wickets at a bowling average of 20.23; he took two five wicket hauls, with best figures of 7 for 33. Following the loss of Hampshire's first-class status, he continued to play second-class cricket for the county until 1889.

Armstrong lived in Southampton until 1889 or 1890, working in a cousin's lamp and oil shop in St. Mary's Street. He married in 1889 and then moved to London to work with his brothers in a wholesale fruit business. He had two children, a boy and a girl. In 1913 returned to Hampshire, where was the proprietor of a wool shop. Following his death at Bournemouth in the first quarter of 1942, his daughter gave an album of press cuttings and badges to the Hampshire Cricket Museum.
