= Jack Beaumont =

Jack Beaumont may refer to:

- Jack Beaumont (cricketer) (1855–1920), English cricketer
- Jack Beaumont (footballer) (born 1994), Scottish footballer
- Jack Beaumont (rower) (born 1993), British rower
