= Frank Shacklock =

English cricketer

Personal information
- Full name: Francis Joseph Shacklock
- Born: 22 September 1861; Crich, Derbyshire, England
- Died: 1 May 1937 (aged 75); Christchurch, Canterbury, New Zealand
- Batting: Right-handed
- Bowling: Right-arm fast
- Role: Bowler

Domestic team information
- Years: Team
- 1883: Nottinghamshire
- 1884–1885: Derbyshire
- 1886–1893: Nottinghamshire
- 1903/04–1904/05: Otago
- FC debut: 13 September 1883 Nottinghamshire v MCC
- Last FC: 3 March 1905 Otago v Australians

Career statistics
Competition	First-class
Matches	156
Runs scored	2,438
Batting average	11.89
100s/50s	0/2
Top score	71
Balls bowled	21,350
Wickets	497
Bowling average	19.03
5 wickets in innings	39
10 wickets in match	8
Best bowling	8/32
Catches/stumpings	92/–
- Source: CricInfo, 24 August 2010

Francis Joseph Shacklock (22 September 1861 – 1 May 1937) was an English cricketer who played first-class cricket for Nottinghamshire in 1883 and between 1886 and 1893, for Derbyshire in 1884 and 1885, for MCC between 1889 and 1893, and for Otago in New Zealand from 1903 to 1905. Shacklock may have been the inspiration for the first name of Arthur Conan Doyle's character Sherlock Holmes.

== Early life and career ==
Shacklock was born at Crich, Derbyshire in 1861. His parents had moved from their home at Kirkby in Ashfield in Nottinghamshire shortly before his birth and the family returned to live in the village in 1867, meaning that Shacklock was qualified to play for both Nottinghamshire and Derbyshire. By 1881 he was making a living as a professional cricketer and was employed in Scotland in 1883 playing for Lasswade. He took all 11 wickets in an innings against a 12-man Edinburgh University side and all 10 in an innings against Loretto during the season, and made his first-class debut for Nottinghamshire in September 1883, playing against MCC and taking a wicket in the first innings and four in the second innings.

A fast bowler who was almost 6 feet (1.8 m) tall, Shacklock joined Derbyshire for the 1884 season and played regularly. In the 1885 season against Yorkshire in August he took 8 for 45 in the first innings and 5 for 87 in the second innings, sharing the top wicket tally for Derbyshire's season with William Cropper. Shacklock took 59 wickets for Derbyshire at an average of 16.74 and a best performance of 8 for 45.

In 1886 Shacklock rejoined Nottinghamshire and played 117 matches for them over the next eight years, taking 360 wickets at an average of 18.74 and a best performance of 8 for 32 against MCC in 1887. In 1893, playing for Nottinghamshire against Somerset, he took four wickets in four deliveries in the second innings – all bowled – and, bowling throughout the innings, finished with 8 for 46. His final appearance for Nottinghamshire came in 1893 against Kent after which he was suspended from the side due to "indiscipline".

== Later career ==
Shacklock had been on the ground staff at Lord's for a six seasons and played for MCC teams between 1888 and 1893. He also spent time as a ground bowler at Oxford University Cricket Club and for four seasons at The Oval. Following his suspension by Nottinghamshire he began a career as a professional in the Lancashire League, playing initially for Nelson Cricket Club for three seasons. He subsequently played for Colne in 1897 and Ramsbottom in 1898. He also worked coaching cricket, including at Solihull Grammar School in Birmingham and at Clongowes Wood College in County Kildare.

In 1903 Shacklock moved to New Zealand, where he was employed as a coach in Dunedin and played four first-class matches for Otago as well as one in 1903–04 for a South Island side. He remained in New Zealand and moved to Christchurch, where he was the principal coach to the Canterbury Cricket Association in the early 1920s. During the First World War he worked at the Trentham Military Camp near Wellington. He died at Christchurch in 1937 after collapsing while travelling on a tram. He was aged 75.

== Legacy ==
Shacklock bowled with "a slinging action" which Wisden said "made the ball swing away". In his obituary, published in the 1938 edition of the Almanack, his bowling was described as having been "considered particularly difficult because of this pronounced swerve from leg" which he "varied with an off-break that came very quickly from the turf". In 156 first-class matches he took 497 wickets, including 39 five-wicket hauls. As a batsman he was considered "unreliable", although he twice scored half-centuries and Wisden considered that he had "played some valuable innings at a time when runs did not come easily". His highest score of 71 came against Gloucestershire in 1887 as part of a century partnership with Arthur Shrewsbury.

Arthur Conan Doyle is believed to have used a combination of Shacklock and Sherwin to name his most famous character, Sherlock Holmes. Conan Doyle was an MCC member and Shacklock and William Mycroft played for Derbyshire in a match against MCC at Lord's in June 1885. The first Sherlock Holmes story was published two years later.
