= Howa Bowl =

Cricket competition

- Administrator: South African Cricket Board
- Format: First Class (3 day)
- First edition: 1972/73
- Latest edition: 1990/91
- Tournament format: Round-robin
- Number of teams: 4
- Most successful: Western Province (14)
- Most runs: Yacoob Omar (3377)
- Most wickets: Vincent Barnes (304)

The Howa Bowl was a first-class cricket competition in South Africa that ran from the 1972–73 to 1990–91 cricket seasons. Originally known as the Dadabhay Trophy, it was contested between Eastern Province, Natal, Transvaal, and Western Province.

The Howa Bowl was run during South Africa's exclusion from international cricket due to apartheid. It was limited to non-white players, who were not permitted to compete in the Currie Cup. It was organised by the South African Cricket Board, with the matches being played over three days. The pitches used in the competition were of poor quality, which is highlighted by the fact that a team made 400 or more in an innings just six times while being bowled out for under 100 on 87 occasions.

In 1991, the fall of apartheid saw South Africa's sporting isolation ended and led to the formation of the United Cricket Board (UCB). Consequently, the racial divisions in the nation's domestic cricket were abolished after 102 years: with this, the raison d'etre for the Howa Bowl ceased to exist, and the competition was ended.

== First-class status ==
Although the 216 Howa Bowl matches had not been given first-class status when the competition ended, the UCB subsequently requested that these be added retrospectively. In 2006, Wisden added these matches to the official records and seven other representative matches between non-white teams.

This decision meant that West Indian Test cricketer Rohan Kanhai, who had played in the competition's 1974/75 season with success, moved past Plum Warner on the list of all-time leading first-class run scorers, and also joined his former teammate Gary Sobers with 86 career centuries.

Further to this, two more instances of the rare dismissal handled the ball were added to the records, along with the first-ever case of a batter being given out timed out: Andrew Jordaan, playing for Eastern Province v Transvaal at Port Elizabeth in 1987–88 – he had been not out overnight, but arrived late the following day due to the roads being poor after torrential rain.

== Champions by season ==
The Howa Bowl was dominated by Western Province, who won fourteen of the 19 titles outright (one was shared with Natal, which was Natal's only title), while Eastern Province won three and Transvaal won one.

Tournament	Winner	Leading run-scorer	Leading wicket-taker
1972/73	Western Province; Natal	Sedick Conrad (447)	Ismail Ebrahim (33)
1973/74	Western Province	Moosa Mangera (360)	Keith Barker (26)
1974/75	Transvaal	Rohan Kanhai (460)	Saait Magiet (28)
1975/76	Western Province	Yacoob Omar (435)	Howard Bergins (30)
1976/77	No competition		
1977/78	Western Province	Yacoob Omar (498)	Armien Jabaar (24)
1978/79	Eastern Province	Yacoob Omar (381)	Rushdi Magiet (27)
1979/80	Western Province	Graham Francois (317)	Lefty Adams (40)
1980/81	Western Province	Rashaad Musson (467)	E Frans (39)
1981/82	Western Province	Neil Fortune (448)	Mustapha Khan (39)
1982/83	Western Province	Mansoor Abdullah (270)	Vincent Barnes (41)
1983/84	Western Province	N Edwards (338)	Armien Jabaar (30)
1984/85	Eastern Province	Garth Cuddumbey (313)	Stephen Draai (32)
1985/86	Eastern Province	Haroon Lorgat (417)	Vincent Barnes (36); T le Roux (36); Jack Manack (36)
1986/87	Western Province	Saait Magiet (335)	Vincent Barnes (42)
1987/88	Western Province	Faiek Davids (429)	Jack Manack (28)
1988/89	Western Province	Faiek Davids (436)	Jack Manack (26)
1989/90	Western Province	Andre Peters (363)	Jack Manack (27)
1990/91	Western Province	Nazeem White (407)	Jack Manack (31)

== Statistical leaders ==
Batsmen
Player	Runs	Average
Yacoob Omar	3,337	34.81
Khaya Majola	2,826	20.77
Saait Magiet	2,650	29.12
Mansoor Abdullah	2,294	28.67
Haroon Lorgat	2,183	24.67

Bowlers
Player	Wickets	Average
Vincent Barnes	304	11.12
Seraj Gabriels	254	15.07
Mustapha Khan	248	19.26
Armien Jabaar	233	13.39
Khaya Majola	219	16.64
