= William Shipton =

English cricketer

Personal information
- Full name: Willam Louis Shipton
- Born: 19 March 1861; Buxton, Derbyshire, England
- Died: 21 October 1941 (aged 80); Buxton, England
- Batting: Right-handed
- Bowling: Right-arm fast

Domestic team information
- Years: Team
- 1884: Derbyshire
- Only FC: 25 August 1884 Derbyshire v Yorkshire

Career statistics
Competition	First-class
Matches	1
Runs scored	4
Batting average	2.00
100s/50s	0/0
Top score	3
Catches/stumpings	0/–
- Source: CricketArchive, 31 August 2011

William Louis Shipton (19 March 1861 – 21 October 1941) was an English cricketer who played for Derbyshire between 1884 and 1893.

Shipton was born in Buxton, Derbyshire, the son of William Parker Shipton, MRCS. He was educated at Repton School where he was in the cricket XI in 1877 and then went to Emmanuel College, Cambridge. He played for Buxton against the Australians in 1878. He played one first-class match for Derbyshire in the 1884 season in August against Yorkshire. He scored 1 run in the first innings and 3 in the second. Also in 1884 he scored an innings of 214 in a match between Buxton and Derbyshire Friars. Shipton was a right-handed batsman and made four runs in two innings in one first-class match. He was described as a "free hitter and good round-arm fast bowler" and "a useful cricketer without becoming great".

Shipton was admitted as a solicitor in 1885 and practised at Buxton. Between 1890 and 1893 he played occasional cricket matches for Derbyshire while they were out of the championship. His brother Herbert also played cricket for MCC, Derbyshire and Staffordshire.

Shipton died at 3, The Square, Buxton at the age of 80.
