= Recreation Ground (Holbeck) =

Cricket stadium in Leeds, West Yorkshire, England

Coordinates: 53.776°N 1.570°W

The Recreation Ground, Holbeck held eight first class cricket matches. Yorkshire CCC played 3 county championship games at the site, including a Roses Match in 1868 and the touring Australians twice played there. The Roses Match, the first first class game on the ground, was remarkable in that Lancashire were bowled out for just 30 and 34 and lost the match by an innings and 186 runs, one of the most comprehensive defeats in the long history of the fixture. George Freeman took 12 for 23 in the match while Tom Emmett bagged 8 for 24. Only two centuries were scored on the ground in first class matches, Irwin Grimshaw scoring an unbeaten 122 in Yorkshire's first innings against Derbyshire CCC in 1886 and Billy Bates making 106 in the second. In 1878 the ground hosted a 3 day match between a Holbeck XVIII against a United South XI including WG Grace, his brother Fred and HRJ Charlwood as well as Billy Midwinter who played for both Australia and England in Test cricket. WG took 18 wickets in the match but was outscored by Fred.

Holbeck Cricket Club used the ground for home games. They were forced to vacate the ground at the end of the 1900 season. The ground was lost to development and is currently covered by housing.
