= Billy Barnes (cricketer) =

English cricketer (1852–1899)

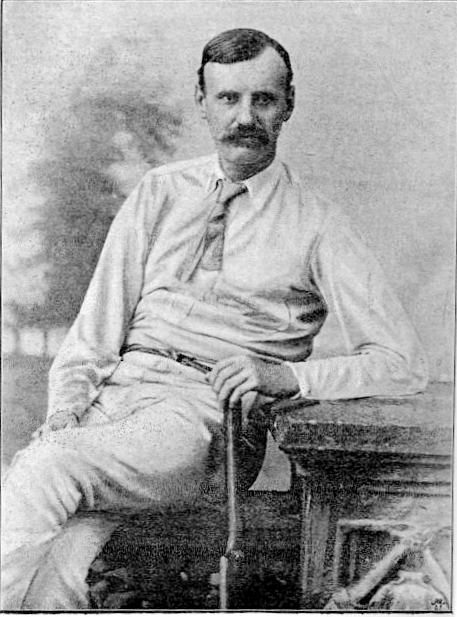
- Barnes in 1893

Personal information
- Full name: William Barnes
- Born: 27 May 1852; Sutton-in-Ashfield, Nottinghamshire
- Died: 24 March 1899 (aged 46); Mansfield Woodhouse, Nottinghamshire
- Batting: Right-handed
- Bowling: Right-arm fast-medium
- Role: All rounder

International information
- National side: England
- Test debut (cap 21): 6 September 1880 v Australia
- Last Test: 12 August 1890 v Australia

Domestic team information
- Years: Team
- 1875–1894: Nottinghamshire

Career statistics
Competition	Test	First-class
Matches	21	459
Runs scored	725	15,425
Batting average	23.38	23.19
100s/50s	1/5	21/70
Top score	134	160
Balls bowled	2,289	42,612
Wickets	51	902
Bowling average	15.54	17.12
5 wickets in innings	3	45
10 wickets in match	0	10
Best bowling	6/28	8/64
Catches/stumpings	19/–	342/3
- Source: CricketArchive, 6 October 2022

William Barnes (27 May 1852 – 24 March 1899) was an English professional cricketer who played for Nottinghamshire County Cricket Club from 1875 to 1894, and in 21 Test matches for England from 1880 to 1890. He was born at Sutton-in-Ashfield, Nottinghamshire, and died at Mansfield Woodhouse, Nottinghamshire.

Barnes was an all-rounder. As a right-handed batsman, he scored 15,425 career runs in 459 first-class matches at an average of 23.19 runs per completed innings with a highest score of 160 as one of 21 centuries. He was a right-arm fast-medium bowler and took 902 first-class wickets at an average of 17.12 runs per wicket. He took five wickets in an innings 45 times with best figures of 8/64. He achieved ten wickets in a match ten times with a best return of 13/89. Barnes generally fielded in close catching positions, sometimes playing as wicket-keeper; he held 342 catches and completed 3 stumpings.

== Early years ==
Born on 27 May 1852, Billy Barnes was mobile as a young man and became a professional cricketer in his teens. Having been born and raised in Sutton-in-Ashfield, he moved to Winchester when he was nineteen to coach the garrison players at Worthy Down Camp. A couple of years later, in 1873, he was engaged by the Victoria Park Club in Leicester. Barnes' elder brother, Thomas, was a first-class cricketer who played for Nottinghamshire in 1872, but he became ill with typhoid in 1873 and died on 22 September. In 1874, Billy Barnes was with the Nottingham Amateurs club, based at Trent Bridge. This brought him into contact with the county club who offered him a playing contract.

In the 1881 UK census, Barnes listed his profession as a cotton weaver. He was then aged 28 and living in Stoney Street, Sutton-in Ashfield, with his wife Eliza, aged 24, who was also born in Sutton-in-Ashfield. Barnes and Eliza later had a son, James (1886–1963), who also played first-class cricket; he made three appearances for Nottinghamshire between 1908 and 1910.

== Cricket career ==
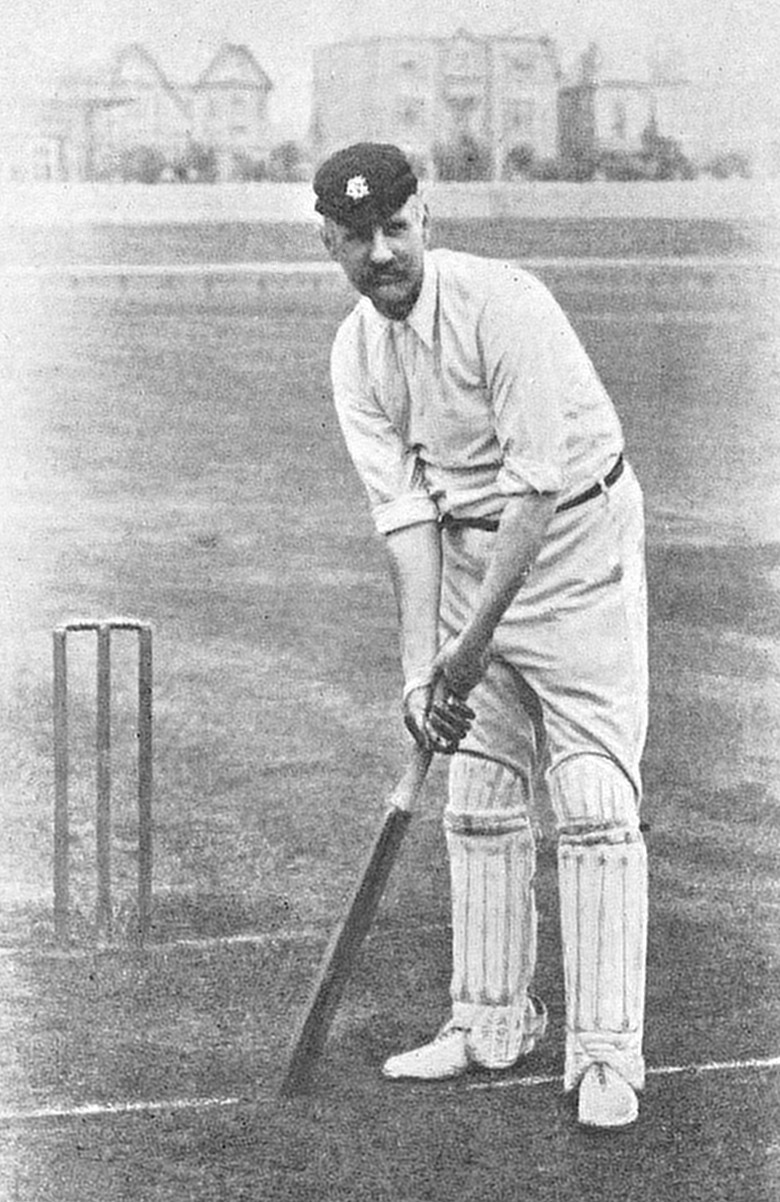
Billy Barnes on the playing field

Barnes played for Nottinghamshire 257 times from 1875 until 1894. In all, he played in 459 first-class matches, including 21 Test matches. He went on three tours of Australia and one of North America.

=== First-class debut ===
Barnes was 23 when he made his first-class debut on 29 July 1875. (Note: Eleven-a-side matches played 1864–1894 which involved certain approved teams may be considered "first-class" in accordance with the ACS' "First-class Matches Guide".) His debut was for Nottinghamshire against Gloucestershire in a three-day inter-county match at Trent Bridge. Gloucestershire, captained by W. G. Grace, won the toss and batted first. They were all out for 110 and Nottinghamshire reached 111/2 at close of play on the first day. On the second day, Nottinghamshire were all out for 177, a first innings lead of 67. Barnes was number 9 in the batting order and scored 11. In their second innings, Gloucestershire were all out for 131. Barnes bowled two four-ball overs and conceded four runs but took no wickets. Nottinghamshire, needing 65 to win, were hard-pressed and struggled to 48/5 at close of play. Barnes had batted at number 5 this time but was run out for only 1. On the third day, Nottinghamshire managed to score the remaining runs, reaching 66/7 to win by three wickets. Barnes played in eight first-class matches in 1875, scoring 145 runs with a highest innings of 45 and held five catches. He did not bowl again that season, or at all in 1876, but became a regular bowler from 1877.

=== Wisden Cricketer of the Year ===
In 1890, Barnes was named as one of Wisden's Nine Great Batsmen.

== Later years ==
Barnes last played for Nottinghamshire in 1894 and then joined the MCC ground staff at Lord's between 1895 and 1898. He stood as umpire in 14 first-class matches. Barnes was the landlord of the Angel Inn in Mansfield Woodhouse during the 1890s. He died there in March 1899.

Barnes' Wisden obituary said he was "one of the leading batsmen of his day from 1880 until 1892" and "for many seasons one of the best change bowlers in England". Wisden added that, as a batsman, Barnes preferred to attack the bowling and would score his runs quickly, his off-side shots (i.e., the cut and drive) being especially good. The Morning Post said in its obituary: "Taking (Barnes) as batsman and bowler together, it may safely be said (Nottinghamshire) never had a more valuable player".
