= Khaya Majola (rugby union) =

South African rugby union player (born 1992)

- Born: 13 March 1992 (age 34) Kokstad, South Africa
- Height: 1.85 m (6 ft 1 in)
- Weight: 105 kg (231 lb; 16 st 7 lb)
- School: Westville Boys' High School, KwaZulu-Natal
- University: Varsity College, Durban
- Notable relative(s): Gerald Majola (father); Khaya Majola (uncle); Eric Majola (grandfather)

Rugby union career
- Position: Flanker
Youth career
- 2008–2013: Sharks
Senior career
Years	Team	Apps	(Points)
2012–2017	Sharks XV	43	(50)
2014–2017	Sharks (Currie Cup)	10	(5)
2015	Sharks	2	(0)
2017–2018	Southern Kings	9	(0)
2019–2020	US Bergerac	15	(10)
2020–Present	Stade Dijonnais Côte D'Or	18	(5)
- Correct as of 9 September 2021
International career
Years	Team	Apps	(Points)
2010	S.A. Under-18		
2012	South Africa Under-20	1	(0)
- Correct as of 25 September 2014

Khaya Majola (born 13 March 1992 in Kokstad, South Africa) is a South African rugby union player who most recently played for the Southern Kings in the Pro14. His regular position is flanker.

== Career ==
=== Youth ===
He represented KwaZulu-Natal since 2008, when he played for them at the Under-16 Grant Khomo Week competition. After playing for a South African Academy side at the Under-18 Craven Week tournament in 2009, he returned to play in the competition for a second time in 2010, this time representing KwaZulu-Natal. At the conclusion of this tournament, he was included in an Under-18 High Performance squad that played in international friendlies against youth sides from France, Namibia and England.

He played for the Sharks U19 side during the 2011 Under-19 Provincial Championship, starting all twelve of their matches and scoring two tries. After a single appearance in the 2012 Vodacom Cup, Majola was included in the South Africa Under-20 squad for the 2012 IRB Junior World Championship held in South Africa. He featured in just one match in the competition, starting their second pool stage match against Italy and helping them to a 52–3 victory. He was named on the bench for their next match against England, but wasn't used during the match or the remainder of the tournament as South Africa eventually won the competition for the first time.

At the conclusion of the Junior World Championship, he made played for the Sharks U21 side in the 2012 Under-21 Provincial Championship, mainly being used as a substitute, but was a regular starter for the side the following season, making eleven starts.

=== Sharks ===
His first class debut came during the 2012 Vodacom Cup competition when he played off the bench in the Sharks XV's match against the SWD Eagles in Durban in a 38–20 victory. That was his only appearance during the competition, but he was more involved in the 2013 Vodacom Cup, making a total of seven appearances, including his first senior start in their match against the Free State XV.

He started all eight matches of the Sharks XV's 2014 Vodacom Cup campaign as they reached the Quarter Finals of the competition as was later named in the Sharks' Currie Cup squad for the first time. After being an unused reserve in the Sharks' match against the Free State Cheetahs in Bloemfontein, he made his Currie Cup debut on 20 September 2014 in their match against the Blue Bulls in Pretoria, helping them to a 26–15 victory. He was named in the starting line-up for the first time the following week for their clash against the Eastern Province Kings.

== Personal ==
He is the son of Gerald Majola, a former player and CEO of the governing body of cricket in South Africa, the CSA.

His uncle, also called Khaya Majola, was a cricketer who represented the SAACB (South African African Cricket Board) during the apartheid era and later became a cricket administrator who helped promote cricket in townships.

His grandfather was Eric Majola, who played rugby and cricket for the black national sides in South Africa in the 1950s.
