= Khaya Gqibitole =

Khaya Gqibitole is an English lecturer at the University of Zululand, South Africa and author of the novel Tutaishi: The African Tale. He was born in the Eastern Cape in South Africa and attended the then Griffith Mxenge College of Education where he obtained a senior teacher's diploma majoring in English and History. He obtained a PhD in English Studies from the University of KwaZulu-Natal.

== Novels and writings ==
Gqibitole has written a novel, which has been translated or adopted to a number of languages, as well as a number of short stories. Particularly his short story Fresh Scars has been internationally received.

=== Tutaishi: The African Tale ===
The novel was published in December 2009 in Zulu and English and later translated to Xhosa for a radio play. 'Tutaishi' is a Swahili word for 'we will survive'. As the title suggests, this is a story of survival which straddles the Congo and South Africa. This is a tale of a girl, Theo, who escapes the brutalities that take place in Bunia, Congo where she loses her family while her little brother is forced to join the militia. She is kidnapped by the same militia and kept as a sex slave. She manages to escape and finds her way to South Africa with the hope of a better life. However, she endures xenophobia, racism, and other forms of exploitation. In the end though, she manages to get to school and befriends a South African young man, Qhama, with whom she struggles until she becomes a respectable artist. Even then, they are not untouched by the scourges of HIV/AIDS and drug abuse. By the end of the novel they have become a husband and wife and have adopted HIV positive children.
