= Saait Magiet =

South African cricketer (1952–2018)

Personal information
- Born: 17 May 1952; Cape Town, South Africa
- Died: 17 July 2018 (aged 66); Terengganu, Malaysia
- Relatives: Rashaad Magiet (nephew)
- Source: Cricinfo, 28 April 2021

Saait Magiet (17 May 1952 – 17 July 2018) was a South African cricketer. He played in more than 60 first-class matches for Western Province from 1971/72 to 1990/91, scoring more than 2,300 runs and taking 169 wickets. Magiet was on holiday in Malaysia when he suffered a fatal heart attack. His funeral took place in Constantia, with thousands of people in attendance.
