= Khaya Dlanga =

South African writer, public speaker, and social media commentator

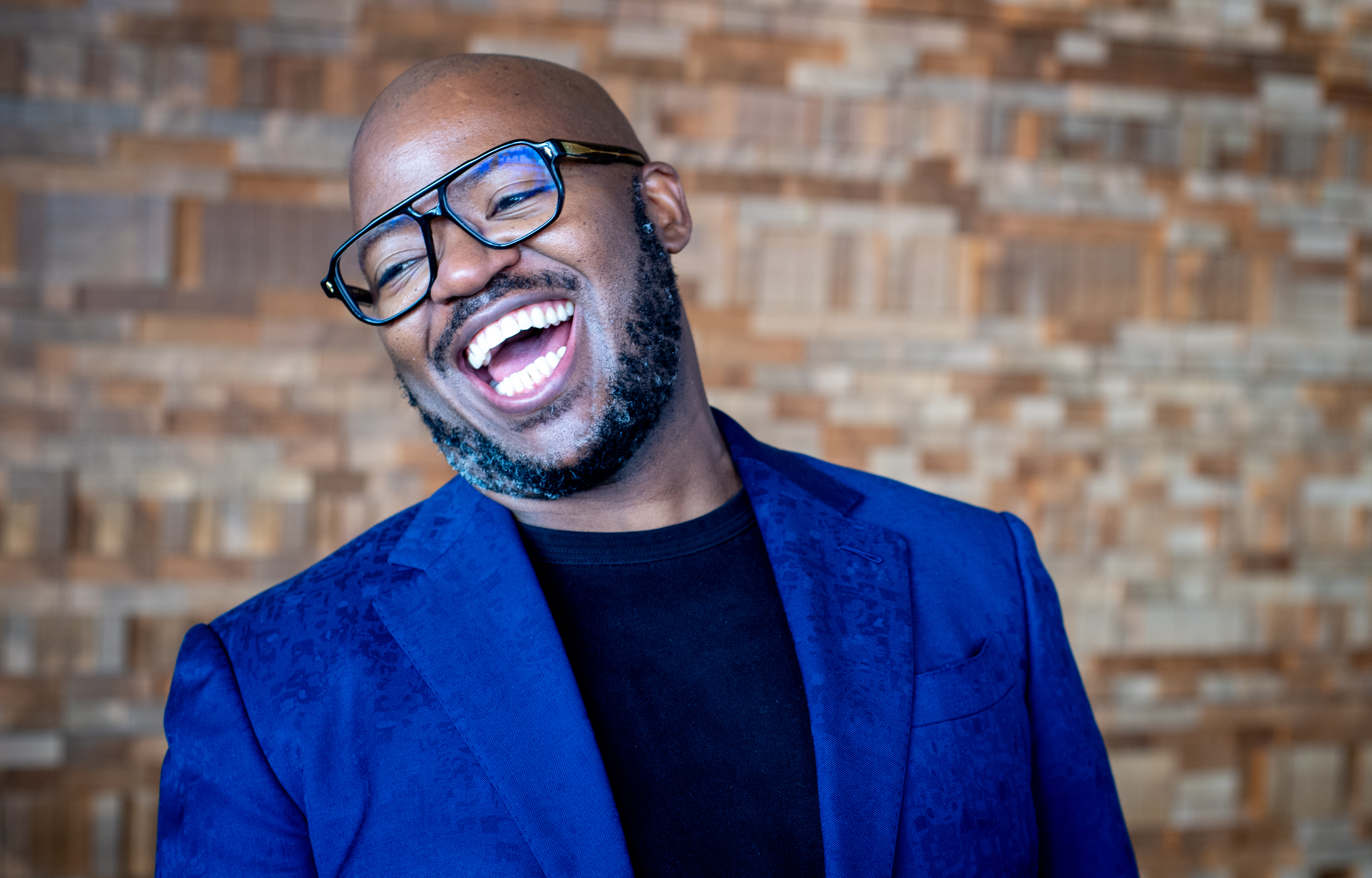
- Born: South Africa
- Occupation(s): Writer, public speaker, social media commentator

Khaya Dlanga is a South African writer, public speaker, and social media commentator. He is the author of several books, such as Life Is Like That Sometimes, which "reflect on love, loss, identity, and the complexities of human relationships" as well as mental health.

Glamour South Africa called Dlanga "one of the most influential figures in South African media."

== Career ==
Dlanga has worked in marketing and management at companies like Coca-Cola South Africa, Rain, and Heineken.

Dlanga has written several books about his own personal experiences, as well as his experiences as a South African person. News24 called his book These Things Really Do Happen to Me "a collection of stories to which most South Africans will be able to relate. Light, fun and at times unbelievable, Khaya Dlanga has a way of telling a tale that is insightful, challenging and often gives a new perspective on life." Some of his books, like It’s The Answers For Me, involve aggregated input from other users on social media platforms.

In Glamour South Africa, Dlanga stated that he was greatly inspired by Ernest Hemingway and specifically The Old Man and the Sea.

== Personal life ==
Dlanga's mother was Nonceba Nolundi Veronica Dlanga, who died on January 22, 2024.

== Bibliography ==
- In My Arrogant Opinion
- To Quote Myself
- These Things Really Do Happen to Me
- It’s The Answers For Me
- Life Is Like That Sometimes
