= Irwin Grimshaw =

English cricketer

Irwin Grimshaw (4 May 1857 – 18 January 1911) was an English first-class cricketer, who played 125 first-class games for Yorkshire County Cricket Club between 1880 and 1887.

Born in Farsley, Leeds, Yorkshire, England, Grimshaw also appeared in thirteen other first-class games for T Emmett's XI (1881–1883), A Shaw's XI (1881), North of England (1883–1887), Nottinghamshire and Yorkshire (1883), the Players (1884), an England Eleven (1884–1886), Lord Sheffield's XI (1885) and L Hall's XI (1885).

A right-handed middle order batsman, he scored 3,682 runs at 18.50. He compiled four centuries, 115 and 129* against Cambridge University, 122* against Derbyshire and 114 against Nottinghamshire. He did not bowl in first-class cricket.

One of seven children and the son of a gamekeeper, he learned his early cricket with Farsley United C.C. and Bingley C.C. After his playing career drew to a close at Yorkshire, he played as a professional at several northern league clubs, including Holmfirth C.C., Nelson C.C. in Lancashire, Cudworth C.C. and Dobcross C.C. From 1885 to at least 1891 he was employed at, and probably landlord of, the New Inn, Farsley but, like many professionals of his era, he fell upon hard times in his later years and died in poverty stricken circumstances.

Grimshaw died in Farsley on 18 January 1911, and was buried at Calverley in Leeds.
