= South African Cricket Board of Control =

Sports governing body in apartheid-era South Africa

- Sport: Cricket
- Jurisdiction: National
- Abbreviation: SACBOC
- Headquarters: Johannesburg, South Africa
- (South Africa)

The South African Cricket Board of Control (SACBOC) was a sports governing body that existed in South Africa under apartheid. It governed cricket games played by non-white players.
