= John Beaumont (cricketer) =

English cricketer and umpire

John Beaumont (16 September 1855 – 1 May 1920) was an English first-class cricketer who played for Surrey and Yorkshire between 1877 and 1890.

Born in Armitage Bridge, Huddersfield, Yorkshire, Beaumont was a right arm fast bowler, who took 467 wickets at an average of 16.71, with a best of 8 for 40 against Yorkshire for his adopted Surrey. He took 46 wickets against the Tykes at 12.47 apiece. He was less accomplished as a right-handed tail end batsman, scoring 881 runs at 8.31, with a highest score of 60 against Gloucestershire.

He played only four matches for his native county before moving to Surrey, for whom he played ninety one times. He also appeared for G.F. Vernon's XI, L Hall's XI and the South of England. He umpired several matches, including four of the Gentlemen v Players games.

He died aged 65, in May 1920, in Lambeth, London.
