= Bowling average =

Statistic used to compare cricket bowlers

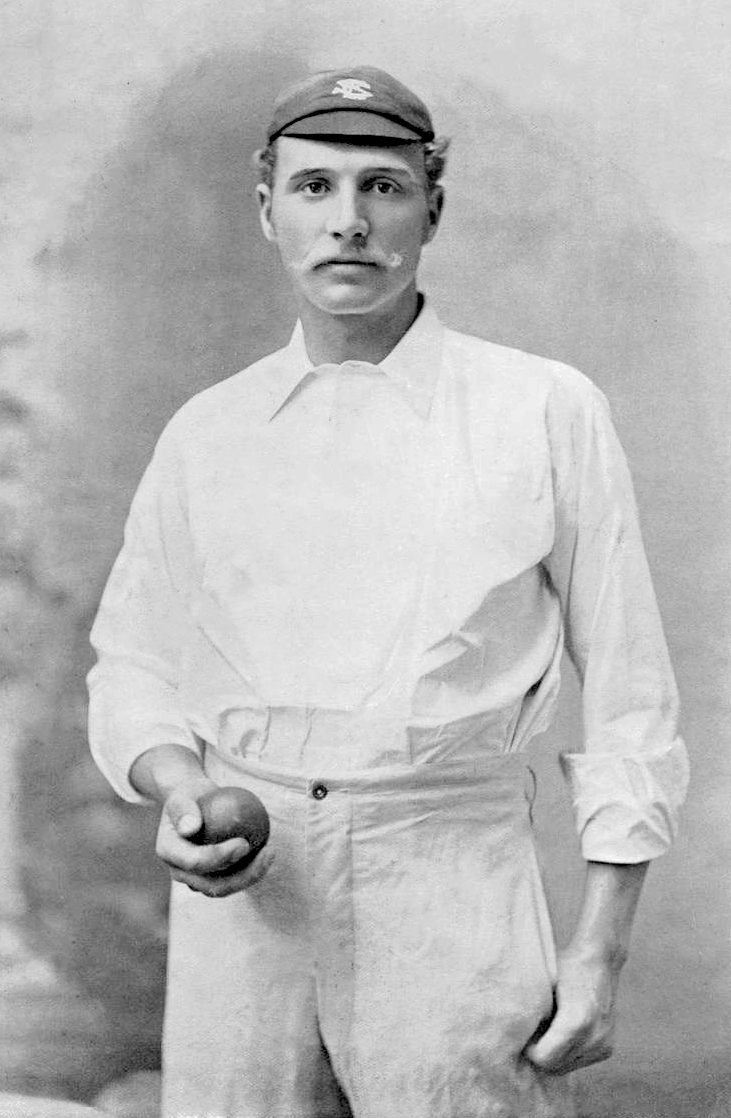
Of bowlers who have bowled at least 600 balls in Test cricket, George Lohmann has the lowest career bowling average, 10.75.

In cricket, a player's bowling average is the number of runs they have conceded per wicket taken. The lower the bowling average is, the better the bowler is performing. It is one of a number of statistics used to compare bowlers, commonly used alongside the economy rate and the strike rate to judge the overall performance of a bowler.

When a bowler has taken only a small number of wickets, their bowling average can be artificially high or low, and unstable, with further wickets taken or runs conceded resulting in large changes to their bowling average. Due to this, qualification restrictions are generally applied when determining which players have the best bowling averages. After applying these criteria, George Lohmann holds the record for the lowest average in Test cricket, having claimed 112 wickets at an average of 10.75 runs per wicket.

== Calculation ==
A cricketer's bowling average is calculated by dividing the numbers of runs they have conceded by the number of wickets they have taken. The number of runs conceded by a bowler is determined as the total number of runs that the opposing side have scored while the bowler was bowling, excluding any byes, leg byes, or penalty runs. The bowler receives credit for any wickets taken during their bowling that are either bowled, caught, hit wicket, leg before wicket or stumped.

$\mathrm{Bowling~average} = \frac{\mathrm{Runs~conceded}}{\mathrm{Wickets~taken}}$

A number of flaws have been identified for the statistic, most notable among these the fact that a bowler who has taken no wickets cannot have a bowling average, as dividing by zero does not give a result. The effect of this is that the bowling average cannot distinguish between a bowler who has taken no wickets and conceded one run, and a bowler who has taken no wickets and conceded one hundred runs. The bowling average also does not tend to give a true reflection of the bowler's ability when the number of wickets they have taken is small, especially in comparison to the number of runs they have conceded. In his paper proposing an alternative method of judging batsmen and bowlers, Paul van Staden gives an example of this:

Suppose a bowler has bowled a total of 80 balls, conceded 60 runs and has taken only 2 wickets so that.. [their average is] 30. If the bowler takes a wicket with the next ball bowled (no runs obviously conceded), then [their average is] 20.

Due to this, when establishing records for bowling averages, qualification criteria are generally set. For Test cricket, the Wisden Cricketers' Almanack sets this as 75 wickets, while Cricinfo requires 2,000 deliveries. Similar restrictions are set for one-day cricket.

== Variations ==
A number of factors other than purely the ability level of the bowler have an effect on a player's bowling average. Most significant among these are the different eras in which cricket has been played. The bowling average tables in Test and first-class cricket are headed by players who competed in the nineteenth century, a period when pitches were uncovered and some were so badly looked after that they had rocks on them. The bowlers competing in the Howa Bowl, a competition played in South African during the apartheid-era, restricted to non-white players, during which time, according to Vincent Barnes: "Most of the wickets we played on were underprepared. For me, as a bowler, it was great." Other factors which provided an advantage to bowlers in that era was the lack of significant safety equipment; batting gloves and helmets were not worn, and batsmen had to be warier. Other variations are caused by frequent matches against stronger or weaker opposition, changes in the laws of cricket and the length of matches.

== Records ==
Completed Test career bowling averages (Note: Qualification: 10 wickets, career completed.)
Bowler	Average
Charles Marriott (ENG)	8.72
Frederick Martin (ENG)	10.07
George Lohmann (ENG)	10.75
Laurie Nash (AUS)	12.60
John Ferris (AUS/ENG)	12.70
Tom Horan (AUS)	13.00
Harry Dean (ENG)	13.90
Albert Trott (AUS/ENG)	15.00
Mike Procter (SA)	15.02
Jack Iverson (AUS)	15.23
Tom Kendall (AUS)	15.35
Alec Hurwood (AUS)	15.45
Billy Barnes (ENG)	15.54
John Trim (WI)	16.16
Billy Bates (ENG)	16.42

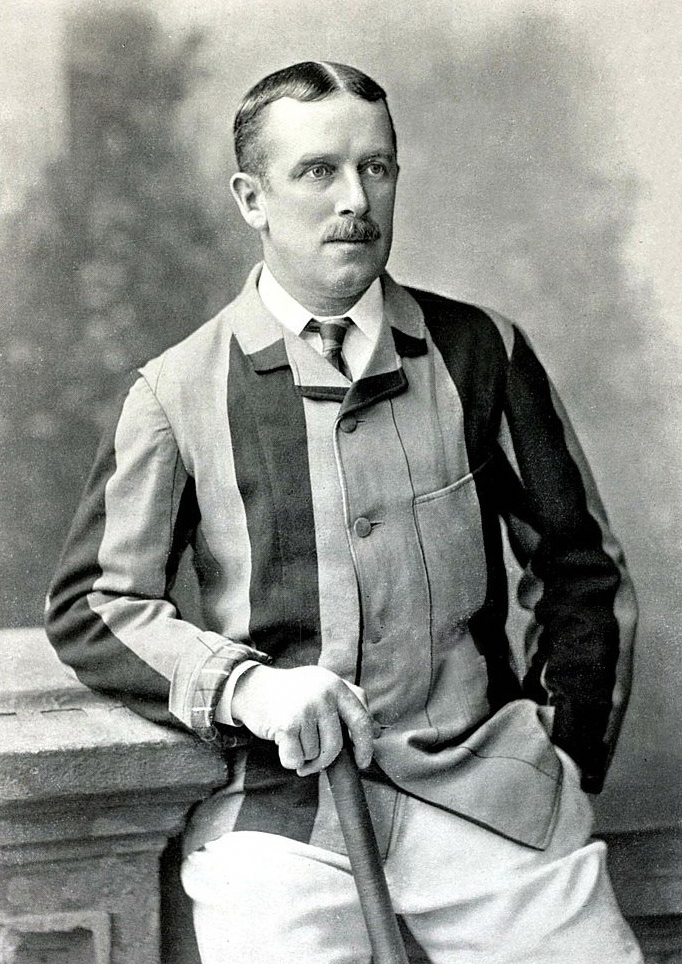
A. N. Hornby is one of three players to have a bowling average of zero in Test cricket.

Due to the varying qualifying restrictions placed on the records by different statisticians, the record for the lowest career bowling average can be different from publication to publication.

=== Test cricket ===
In Test cricket, George Lohmann is listed as having the superior average by each of the Wisden Cricketers' Almanack, Cricinfo and CricketArchive. Though all three use different restrictions, Lohmann's average of 10.75 is considered the best. If no qualification criteria were applied at all, three players—Wilf Barber, A. N. Hornby and Bruce Murray—would tie for the best average, all having claimed just one wicket in Test matches, without conceding any runs, thus averaging zero.

ESPNcricinfo lists Betty Wilson as having the best Women's Test cricket average with 11.80, while CricketArchive accepts Mary Spear's average of 5.78.

=== One Day Internationals ===
In One Day Internationals, the varying criteria set by ESPNcricinfo and CricketArchive result in same player being listed as holding the record. ESPNcricinfo has the stricter restriction, requiring 1,000 deliveries, where Joel Garner is the record-holder, having claimed his wickets at an average of 18.84. CricketArchive has more relaxed requirement of 400 deliveries, where Ali Khan holds the record with an average of 16.42.

In women's One Day International cricket, Caroline Barrs tops the CricketArchive list with an average of 9.52, but by ESPNcricinfo's stricter guidelines, the record is instead held by Gill Smith's 12.53.

=== T20 Internationals ===
The record is again split for the two websites for Twenty20 International cricket. In this situation ESPNcricinfo has the boundary of 500 balls to have been bowled, through which Dhruvkumar Maisuria holds the record with an average of 9.46. But the 200 deliveries required by CricketArchive results in Andre Botha being listed as the superior, averaging 8.76.

=== First Class cricket ===
Domestically, the records for first-class cricket are dominated by players from the nineteenth century, who make up sixteen of the top twenty by ESPNcricinfo's criteria of 5,000 deliveries. William Lillywhite, who was active from 1825 to 1853 has the lowest average, claiming his 1,576 wickets at an average of just 1.54. However, his average is skewed due to incomplete data collection. The leading players from the twentieth century are Stephen Draai and Vincent Barnes with averages of just under twelve, both of whom claimed the majority of their wickets in the South African Howa Bowl tournament during the apartheid era.

== See also ==
- Batting average (cricket)
- Strike rate

== Bibliography ==
- van Staden, Paul J. (January 2008). Comparison of bowlers, batsmen and all-rounders in cricket using graphical displays (PDF). Pretoria: University of Pretoria, Faculty of Natural and Agricultural Sciences, Department of Statistics. ISBN 978-1-86854-733-3. Archived from the original (PDF) on 1 July 2014.
