= Jack Newman (English cricketer) =

English cricketer (1884–1973)

Personal information
- Full name: John Alfred Newman
- Born: 12 November 1884; Southsea, Hampshire, England
- Died: 21 December 1973 (aged 89); Groote Schuur, Cape Province, South Africa
- Batting: Right-handed
- Bowling: Right-arm medium Right-arm off break

Domestic team information
- Years: Team
- 1906–1930: Hampshire
- 1922–1930: Marylebone Cricket Club
- 1927/28–1928/29: Canterbury

Umpiring information
- FC umpired: 220 (1931–1939)

Career statistics
| Competition | First-class |
|---|---|
| Matches | 541 |
| Runs scored | 15,364 |
| Batting average | 21.57 |
| 100s/50s | 10/69 |
| Top score | 166* |
| Balls bowled | 102,779 |
| Wickets | 2,054 |
| Bowling average | 25.02 |
| 5 wickets in innings | 134 |
| 10 wickets in match | 35 |
| Best bowling | 9/131 |
| Catches/stumpings | 318/– |
- Source: Cricinfo, 15 March 2024

John Alfred Newman (12 November 1884 – 21 December 1973) was an English professional first-class cricketer who played county cricket for Hampshire between 1906 and 1930, and in the Plunket Shield for Canterbury in New Zealand for two seasons in the late 1920s. He was born in Southsea, but grew up in the village of Bitterne near Southampton. An all-rounder, he came to the attention of Hampshire as a teenager. A right-handed batsman and right-arm bowler, who was able to bowl medium paced outswingers with the new ball, followed by off spin once the shine had worn off the ball. Debuting in 1906, Newman would make nearly 550 appearances in first-class cricket. In these, he took 2,054 wickets and scored 15,364 runs. He formed a bowling partnership at Hampshire with Alec Kennedy, with the pair sometimes bowling unchanged throughout both innings of a match. He had the distinction of achieving the double on five occasions, and is one of just three players to take over 2,000 wickets, but to never play Test cricket.

Following his retirement, Newman spent the English summers between 1931 and 1939 umpiring, with him standing in 220 first-class matches. During the winter months he coached aboard, predominantly in South Africa, where he later emigrated to. He died in Cape Town in December 1973, aged 89, following a cerebral haemorrhage.

== Playing career ==
=== Early life and pre-war career ===
Newman was born in Southsea on 12 November 1884. At an early age, he moved with his parents to the village of Bitterne near Southampton. He first took up cricket when he played for his local Sunday school team. At the age of 14, Newman attended a match at the County Ground in Southampton, where whilst watching the Hampshire players practice in the nets, he asked Thomas Soar if he could bowl to them, and was given permission. After watching him bowl for a few minutes, Soar fetched Hampshire secretary Fred Bacon, who invited Newman to join the staff at Hampshire when he left school in 1901. He made his debut in first-class cricket for Hampshire against Warwickshire at Edgbaston in the 1906 County Championship, with Newman making a further appearance that season against Kent.

Newman established himself in the Hampshire side in 1907, making first-class 19 appearances. An all-rounder, Newman was a versatile bowler who could open the bowling with medium-paced outswingers, and once the shine had worn off the ball, he would change to bowling off spin. In first full season, he took 46 wickets at an average of 28.91, and took his maiden five wicket haul with figures of 5 for 124 against Sussex in the County Championship. The following season, he made 22 first-class appearances, taking 93 wickets at an average of 20.62; he took five wickets in an innings on seven occasions during the season, in addition to taking ten wickets in a match thrice. His best innings figures in 1908 (8 for 54) came while playing for a Hambledon XII in a commemorative first-class match against an England XI at Broadhalfpenny Down. He was Hampshire's leading wicket-taker in the 1908 County Championship, with 77. In 1909, he took 89 wickets at an average of 20.89 from 23 appearances, taking five wickets or more in an innings on seven occasions; his best innings figures that season were 8 for 43 against the touring Australians at Southampton, a match in which he also took a hat-trick.

In 1910, Newman began what would become a twenty-year bowling partnership with Alec Kennedy. In the 1910 season, he took 156 wickets at an average of 18.45 from 23 matches; he took five wickets or more in an innings on seventeen occasions and took ten wickets or more in a match on seven. He was Hampshire's leading wicket-taker in the 1910 County Championship, and nationally was second in the wicket-taking aggregate, behind Razor Smith's 215. His bowling form fell away in 1911, with him taking 79 wickets at an average of 31.67 from 25 appearances. His bowling returns recovered the following season, with Newman taking 99 wickets at an average of 23.34 from 27 appearances. His all-round credentials would come to the fore in the 1913 season. With the ball, he took 117 wickets at an average of 22.58 from 28 appearances, taking five wickets in an innings on eight occasions. With the bat, he scored 975 runs, more than double his previous highest amount across a season, averaging 21.66. In the 1914 season, which was truncated in August by the outbreak of the First World War, he took 82 wickets at an average of 25.03 from 30 matches. Alongside this, Newman also passed a thousand runs in a season for the first time. His 1,118 runs came at an average of 24.30, and included a maiden first-class century with an unbeaten 107 runs against Somerset, having also taken 5 for 43 in Somerset's first innings. With the Marylebone Cricket Club (MCC) President Francis Lacey confirming the cessation of cricket during the war, first-class cricket in England would be suspended until 1919.

=== War service and cricket in India ===
Newman would serve in the war with the 5th Battalion, Hampshire Regiment, enlisting alongside other peers from Hampshire. He served with the battalion in British India where he played regimental and first-class cricket. Newman played in the first-class war relief match between an England XII and an Indian XII at the Bombay Gymkhana. He played a further first-class match later in the war, when he played for the Maharaja of Cooch-Behar's XI against the Bengal Governor's XI, a match in which Newman and Frank Tarrant took every wicket to fall in both of the Governor's XI innings. Shortly after the cessation of hostilities in November 1918, Newman played for an England XII against an Indian XII at Bombay, and whilst awaiting demobilisation he made two further first-class appearances, playing twice for the Maharaja of Cooch-Behar's XI against the Bengal Governor's XI and Morice Bird's personal XI, in December 1918 and January 1919 respectively. In the latter two fixtures he had success, taking five wicket hauls in both.

=== Post-war career ===
Newman missed the resumption of cricket in 1919 as he was still awaiting demobilisation in India. He returned to England ahead of the 1920 season, where he resumed his career with Hampshire. Making 26 appearances in the 1920 County Championship, he took 111 wickets at an average of 25.33, having taken five wickets or more in an innings on eight occasions. He was second in Hampshire's Championship bowling aggregates, behind compatriot Kennedy who took 164 wickets; between the pair, they accounted for 285 of Hampshire's wickets. With Hampshire losing several cricketers during the war, Newman's medium-pace was utilised more opening the bowling in order to adjust the balance of the depleted Hampshire team. The following season, Newman achieved the double for the first time. With the ball he took 177 wickets at an average of 21.56 from 29 matches; he took five wickets in an innings on 13 occasions and ten wickets in a match thrice. It was to be his most successful season as a bowler, with his 177 wickets the second highest taken by a Hampshire bowler in a season. He took his career best bowling figures of 9 for 131 against Essex at Bournemouth in June. Newman and Kennedy again led the Hampshire attack in 1921, bowling between them 14,792 deliveries and taking 340 wickets. Against Sussex at Portsmouth, Newman and Kennedy bowled unchanged throughout the match. With the bat, he scored 1,065 runs at an average of 30.42. His sole century in 1921, an unbeaten 166 against Glamorgan, was to be the highest score of his first-class career.

Newman did not achieve the double in 1922, but did take 122 wickets at an average of 24.37 from 31 matches, claiming five wickets or more in an innings on seven occasions. He was involved in controversy during the season when Hampshire played Nottinghamshire at Trent Bridge in the County Championship. In response to the crowd barracking him for perceived timewasting, he refused to bowl, resulting in Hampshire's captain Lionel Tennyson ordering him from the field, responding to Tennyson by kicking down the stumps as he left the field. At the close of play Tennyson summoned him into the amateurs' changing-room. "Jack," he said, "you have this afternoon disgraced the annals of Hampshire cricket... Hampshire cricket, mind you, the cradle of the game. You must send a letter of apology. Sit down; here's pen and paper. I'll dictate the letter." Tennyson proceeded to speak out loud a letter to the president of Nottinghamshire in which Newman offered his profound apologies. A second letter, to Arthur Carr, the Nottinghamshire captain, followed. Tennyson then dictated a letter from Newman to himself: "Now, Jack, a final letter. To the Hon. L H Tennyson, captain, Hampshire County CC, Trent Bridge, Nottinghamshire. Dear Skipper, I humbly regret my behaviour, and so on, you confounded old villain; and don't let us have a repetition of your disgraceful conduct. And, good evening to you, Jack, and, damn you, take this." Upon completion, Tennyson thrust a five-pound note – a considerable sum in those days – into Newman's hands. In the 1922 season, he played for the MCC for the first time, and was chosen to represent the Players in the Gentlemen v Players match.

Newman achieved the double for the second time in 1923. He scored 1,006 runs at an average of 22.86 from 30 appearances, making one century. With the ball, he took 148 wickets at an average of 25.25, claiming five wickets or more in an innings on eight occasions, while taking ten or more on four. For the second time, Newman and Kennedy bowled unchanged against Somerset in 1923. In 31 appearances in 1924, Newman struggled for batting form, with his bowling returns also diminishing. He took 87 wickets at an average of 31.01, but nonetheless against Sussex he managed to dismiss three Sussex batsmen in four balls. His bowling returns further declined in 1925, with 65 wickets at an average of 35.12 from 31 matches. Both his batting and bowling form recovered in 1926, with him achieving the double for the third time. In 33 appearances, he scored 1,468 runs at an average of 32.17, making two centuries. With the ball, he took 154 wickets at an average of 24.70, claiming five wickets or more in an innings on nine occasions, while taking ten or more on five. He achieved his best all-round performance during the season, scoring 66 and an unbeaten 42 runs and taking 14 wickets for 148 runs against Gloucestershire in the County Championship.

Newman again achieved the double in the following season. In 32 appearances he scored 1,448 runs at an average of 32.17, making three centuries. With the ball, he took 115 wickets at an average of 23.19, claiming five wickets or more in an innings on nine occasions, while taking ten or more on three. He took his career-best match figures of 16 wickets for 88 runs against Somerset in the County Championship; this would remain the best match figures taken by a Hampshire bowler until 2019, when Kyle Abbott took 17 wickets for 86 runs. He also scored two centuries in the same match against Surrey, both scores of 102, with one unbeaten.

=== Playing in New Zealand and retirement ===
Alongside five other county cricketers, Newman embarked for New Zealand in the winter that followed the 1927 season to coach for the Canterbury Cricket Association (CCA). He played first-class cricket for Canterbury in the 1927–28 Plunket Shield, making two appearances, while also playing against the touring Australians. Alongside this he also played twice for The Rest against New Zealand. Though he did not have success with the ball in these five matches, he did score 414 runs at an average of 51.75, making a century (112 not out) on his Canterbury debut against Otago. He returned to England aboard the RMS Mataroa. He completed the double for the fifth and final time during the 1928 season. Newman struggled for form during the early part of the season, but improved as the season progressed. From 31 appearances in 1928, he scored 1,474 runs at an average of 29.48, making three centuries. With the ball, he took 112 wickets at an average of 30.30, claiming five wickets or more in an innings on five occasions.

He returned to New Zealand to coach following the 1928 season. There, he made three appearances for Canterbury in the 1928–29 Plunket Shield. He scored 193 runs at an average of 48.25, but struggled with the ball, averaging 57.57 for his seven wickets. During the 1929 English season, he took 73 wickets at an average of 29.97 from 28 appearances, claiming five wickets or more in an innings on three occasions. With the bat he scored 963 runs at an average of 19.26. Whilst he returned to coach in New Zealand with the CCA following the 1929 season, however he did not play any further representative cricket for Canterbury as his contact with the CCA stipulated that he could not play in representative matches. In the 1930 English season, he took 81 wickets at an average of 25.02 from 27 appearances, claiming five wickets of more on seven occasions; he claimed his 2,000th first-class cricket during the course of the season. However, his batting aggregate declined to 683 runs at an average of 18.76. Newman retired from playing at the end of the 1930 season, having been encouraged to so after suffering a breakdown.

=== Playing style and statistics ===
In a long first-class career that lasted from 1906 to 1930, Newman made 541 appearances in first-class cricket. As a spin bowler, his run-up came off eight springy-paces, delivering his off-spinners from a high-arm action at nearly medium-pace. He was able to use his long fingers to good effect to elicit sharp turn on the ball when bowling off spinners. He possessed the ability to vary his pace and length, doing so subtly. He had amongst his spin-bowling repertoire a faster ball which was well concealed during its delivery. Arlott would later write that he had a preference for bowling over the wicket, as opposed to around, and was less effective when utilised from around the wicket. Newman took 2,054 wickets during his first-class career at an average of 25.02, (Note: Wisden Cricketers' Almanack credits him with 2,032 wickets at 25.15. See also: Variations in First-Class Cricket Statistics#Other cricketers) taking five wickets or more in an innings on 134 occasions and ten wickets or more in a match on 35 occasions. For Hampshire in 506 appearances, he took 1,946 wickets; only Kennedy (2,549) and Derek Shackleton (2,669) have taken more first-class wickets for Hampshire. He completed the double of 1,000 runs and 100 wickets in a season five times between 1921 and 1928; ten doubles have been taken for Hampshire, with Newman and Kennedy each accounting for half of them. He is one of three bowlers to take over 2,000 first-class wickets but never earn a Test cap, with the others being Don Shepherd and George Dennett.

As a batsman, Arlott would describe him as "an orthodox, determined batsman". he scored 15,364 runs at an average of 21.57, making ten centuries and 69 half centuries. For his Hampshire, he scored 13,904 runs. It was not uncommon for Newman to finish bowling and return to the field to open the batting, often doing so alongside Kennedy. He also held 318 catches, 295 of which came for Hampshire. In 1981, Arlott included him in a side of the best players who were never selected by England to play in a Test match.

== Umpiring career ==
Following his retirement, Newman began standing as a first-class umpire. He first umpired in representative cricket whilst coaching in South Africa in the winter following the 1930 season, when he stood in a match between Cape Province and the touring MCC. He stood in a second first-class match in England in 1931 between the touring New Zealanders and the Gentlemen of England at Eastbourne. He was appointed to the first-class umpires list in December 1931, alongside Herbert Baldwin, Bill Hitch, Alec Skelding, and Claud Woolley. He remained on the first-class umpires list until 1939, standing in 218 first-class matches in England since his appointment to it.

== Coaching career ==
Newman had begun his coaching abroad during the winter months in England as early as 1922. After the end of his umpiring career, Newman coached cricket in India, New Zealand, and South Africa. He subsequently emigrated to Cape Town, where he coached for much of the last thirty years of his life. Whilst coaching at Diocesan College, Newman coached future South African Test cricketers Sandy Bell and Tuppy Owen-Smith. He coached in Western Province, with the with Pawle opining that "no one did more for Western Province cricket"; in recognition of his contributions to Western Province cricket, Newman was afforded a benefit, with the proceeds providing him an annuity for the remainder of his life. He was also afforded life membership at Newlands.

== Later life and death ==
Newman spent his later years living in Cape Town. He returned to England in later life to visit his former Hampshire teammates in Southampton, making his last visit in 1966, at which point his health had begun to decline. Newman died at the Groote Schuur estate in Cape Town on 21 December 1973, aged 89, having been admitted to hospital following a cerebral haemorrhage. He died a bachelor.

== Works cited ==
- Arlott, John (1985). Arlott on Cricket: His Writings on the Game. London: Fontana. ISBN 978-0-0021-8082-5 – via Internet Archive.
- Arlott, John (1986). "Phil Mead". John Arlott's 100 Greatest Batsmen. London: Macdonald. ISBN 978-0-356-12365-3 – via Internet Archive.
- Broom, John (2022). Cricket in the First World War. Barnsley: Pen and Sword History. ISBN 978-1-5267-8014-0.
