= Cricket in World War I =

Cricket in World War I was severely curtailed in all nations where first-class cricket was then played except India. In England, South Africa and the West Indies, first-class cricket was entirely abandoned for the whole of the war, whilst in Australia and New Zealand regular first-class competitions were played for the 1914–15 season but abandoned afterwards. In South Africa, first-class cricket did not recommence until a series of matches against the Australian Imperial Forces cricket team in late 1919, and provincial cricket was not played until a one-off match between Transvaal and Natal in April 1920.

At least 210 first-class cricketers are known to have joined the armed forces, of whom 34 were killed. The obituary sections of John Wisden's Cricketers Almanack between 1915 and 1919 contained the names of hundreds of players and officials of all standards who died in the service of their country.

== Abandonment of first-class cricket ==
With war looming in August, cricketers with military commitments, such as Yorkshire skipper Sir Archibald White left their teams to do their duty, while Pelham Warner and Arthur Carr, who captained Middlesex and Nottinghamshire respectively, followed when war was declared. The County Championship was not immediately abandoned, MCC issuing a statement that "no good purpose can be saved at the moment by cancelling matches" on 6 August, but attendances plummeted. Jack Hobbs, who had scored a career best 226 in front of over 14,000 spectators on 3 August, had to rearrange his benefit match from the Oval, after it was requisitioned by the Army, to Lord's and on 13 August the MCC announced that all matches arranged at Lord's up to September would be postponed.

News of casualties suffered by the British Expeditionary Force in Belgium was already turning the public mood against "business as usual" and on 27 August a letter written by W. G. Grace was published in The Sportsman in which he declared that

I think the time has arrived when the county cricket season should be closed, for it is not fitting at a time like this that able-bodied men should be playing cricket by day and pleasure-seekers look on. I should like to see all first-class cricketers of suitable age set a good example and come to the help of their country without delay in its hour of need."

The remaining matches in the Championship were abandoned "in deference to public opinion" while the MCC closed the Scarborough Festival as "the continuation of first-class cricket is hurtful to the feelings of a section of the public". The last match to be completed, on 2 September, pitted Sussex against Yorkshire at Hove. "The men's hearts were barely in the game", the periodical Cricket reported at the time, "and the match was given up as a draw at tea." The last match played, twenty five years and a day later, before the abandonment of first-class cricket due to World War II saw the same teams facing each other on the same ground.

First World War; 28 July 1914 – 11 November 1918
No first-class cricket in Australia; 19 February 1915 – 26 December 1918
No first-class cricket in England; 2 September 1914 – 12 May 1919
No break in first-class cricket in India
No first-class cricket in New Zealand; 2 April 1915 – 25 December 1917
No first-class cricket in South Africa; 11 April 1914 – 18 October 1919
│
1914
│
1915
│
1916
│
1917
│
1918
│
1919
│
1920

W. G. Grace, who had called for the early abandonment of cricket in his letter to The Sportsman, was reputed to shake his fist at the Zeppelins floating over his South London home. When chided by a friend who pointed out that the fast bowling of Ernie Jones had not discomforted him half so much, Grace replied testily "But I could SEE him!" Grace had played his second-last match, at the age of 66, for Eltham against Grove Park on 25 July 1914, scoring an unbeaten 69 out of 155 for six declared. He died of a stroke on 23 October 1915.

== Cricket continues ==
While first-class cricket had been cancelled in the major cricketing nations, cricket itself continued around the world. In England, the Oval and Lord's hosted a number of matches between representative services sides, Army regiments and other service units. Club cricket continued, especially in the north of England, where the Lancashire League played without a break each summer.

Geese were kept on the grass at Lord's while the pavilion at Old Trafford was transformed into a Red Cross hospital. In four years, 1,800 patients were treated there, with beds occupying every possible space, including corridors and stairway landings.

Anzac soldiers played improvised games cricket under shellfire on Shell Green in Gallipoli in 1915. The Australians played a game in view of the Turks to give the impression of normality and confidence while the entire force was being secretly evacuated from the beach area.

Robert Graves recounts a game between officers and sergeants at Vermelles in France in 1915, when a bird cage with a dead parrot inside was used as the wicket. The game was abandoned when German machine gun fire at an aeroplane caused falling bullets to land dangerously close to the pitch.

Cricket was played overseas, often in fund raising matches. A game involving an English XII against an Indian team held at the Bombay Gymkhana in December 1915 for war relief was watched by 40,000 people. J. G. Greig scored 216 and Frank Tarrant took 9 for 35.

The only first-class cricketer to be awarded the Victoria Cross was John Smyth, for conspicuous gallantry with the 15th Ludhiana Sikhs in India in 1915. He also received the Military Cross and was decorated by the Russians. He played his two matches for the Europeans at Lahore, making 3 and 19 in the first and taking a wicket while posting 51 and 27 in the second. He was invalided out the army in the Second World War and became a Conservative MP, being created a Baronet in 1955 and a Privy Counsellor in 1962.

Cricket raised funds in other ways. George Robey, the "Prime Minister of Mirth", auctioned cricket memorabilia, including bats used by W.G. Grace, to raise funds for St. Dunstan's Hostel for Blind Servicemen.

Some cricket was still played in England, with the Australian Imperial Forces, featuring Charlie Macartney, playing an English Army XI at Lord's in July 1917. Lord's was also the scene for a baseball match between American and Canadian teams watched by 10,000 with the proceeds going to the Canadian Widows and Orphans Fund. Club cricket continued to the extent that it could, with large crowds attending the matches.

Lord Harris, captain of England in the first English Test match in 1880, took part in a match at Lord's in 1918 between Plum Warner's XI and the Public Schools. His Lordship, aged 67, scored 11 before being run out.

With the war drawing to a close King George V watched England play the Dominions at Lord's in 1918. The Dominions opened their batting with South African Herbie Taylor and Australian Charlie Macartney.

== "Doing their bit" ==
210 first-class cricketers enlisted in the armed services, and others undertook war related work in support of the war effort. Taking Surrey as an example, Ernie Hayes, Bill Hitch and Andy Sandham joined the Sportsman's Battalion of the Royal Fusiliers while former fast bowler Neville Knox became a private in the Public Schools Battalion. Bert Strudwick, the Surrey wicket-keeper, worked in a South London munitions plant alongside teammate Razor Smith. Other cricketers helped in the recruitment drive, with Gilbert Jessop, promoted to the rank of captain in the 14th Service Battalion, Manchester Regiment, making speeches encouraging men to join up.

=== John Philip Wilson ===
Jack Wilson played 9 matches for Yorkshire County Cricket Club, and a couple for HDG Leveson-Gower's XI in 1912 and 1913. He then turned his hand to flying, gaining his pilot's license on a Vickers biplane at Brooklands in June 1914. He was commissioned into the Royal Naval Air Service when war broke out and flew missions throughout the war. In April 1915 he and another officer 'observed two submarines lying alongside the Mole at Zeebrugge' and 'attacked them, dropping four bombs, it was believed with successful results.' On 7 June the same year the Admiralty reported that

this morning at 2.30 am, an attack was made on the airship shed at Evere, north of Brussels, by Flight-Lieutenants J. P. Wilson RN and J. S. Mills RN. Bombs were dropped and the shed was observed to be in flames. It is not known whether a zeppelin was inside, but the flames reached a great height, coming out from both three sides of the shed. Both pilots returned safely.

A few days later, on 21 June, the Admiralty announced that the King had been graciously pleased to award the Distinguished Service Cross to both Wilson and Mills 'for their services on 7 June 1915, when after a long flight in darkness over hostile territory, they threw bombs on the zeppelin shed at Evere near Brussels, and destroyed a zeppelin which was inside. The two officers were exposed to heavy anti-aircraft fire during the attack'.

At the Yorkshire AGM in 1916, Lord Hawke said of Wilson, "May he continue his splendid work, and be with us when we again resume hostilities on the cricket field:" In the county yearbook for that year there is a photograph of him dressed in naval uniform. He was also awarded the Belgian Order of the Crown (LG 29 August 1917), and in the New Year's Honours for 1919 he was awarded the Air Force Cross, "in recognition of distinguished service" (LG 1 January 1919).

In a conflict when the average survival time for R.F.C. pilots could be counted in hours, Wilson was promoted to major, survived the war and died on 3 October 1959 in Tickton, Beverley, Yorkshire. His other claims to fame include winning the Grand National on 'Double Chance' in 1925.

== Cricket in war art ==
Cricket was used as a theme in cartoons highlighting the "Hun's unsportsmanlike attitude to war". J.H. Dowd's The Kaiser's Cricket depicted a spike-helmeted German soldier playing cricket in a most underhand way. He is shown catching a ball in the field with a net, hitting an umpire with a bat, batting with a net in front of his stumps, pushing a batsman out of his crease before stumping him and bowling a ball from the middle of the pitch.

C. M. Padday's painting of Royal Navy sailors playing cricket on deck "somewhere in the tropics" shows a ball made of twine attached to wickets made of buckets for easy retrieval when it was hit over the side.

A Punch cartoon depicted the Germans in more lighthearted manner in a cartoon which showed a German plane flying over a cricket match. The game continues, even as the plane drops its bombs, with the fielders chasing a ball to the boundary. The caption, playing on the German misunderstanding of cricket, shows the German airman's report as saying

We dropped bombs on a British formation, causing the troops to disperse and run about in a panic stricken manner".

The fear of poison gas attacks spreading to England saw the British Government warn citizens to take their gas masks everywhere in 1916, just in case. Essex cricketer and journalist Edward Sewell was photographed in full cricket gear wearing his mask.

== Grenades and bowling techniques ==
British and Empire soldiers were instructed to throw the Mills bomb, a hand-held fragmentation grenade using a technique similar to that of bowling a cricket ball. Training classes were given on how to best do this. A cartoon satirising this was published by Geoffrey Stobie in 1918. The image has two panes; in the left pane, a cricketer is about to deliver the ball, his left arm out in front of him and his right vertically down behind his back holding the ball. In the right pane, this position is mirrored by a soldier, but rather than a cricket ball, he is holding a grenade in his right hand.

The No. 15 Ball grenade was referred to as the 'cricket ball' grenade. It was ignited by striking the grenade like a match before throwing it at the enemy. It proved unreliable, as it was susceptible to the damp, and was withdrawn after the Battle of Loos.

== Deaths ==
=== Test cricketers ===
- Despite his epilepsy, Sergeant Colin Blythe joined the Kent Fortress Royal Engineers at the outbreak of war in 1914. He served on the home front in the Territorial Force initially, signing an Imperial Service Obligation after the introduction of conscription in January 1916. He was transferred to the Royal Engineers in 1917 and attached to the 12th (Service) battalion of the King's Own Yorkshire Light Infantry which specialised in laying and maintaining light railway lines. He embarked for France in September 1917 and was killed by shell-fire on the railway between Pimmern and Forest Hall near Passchendaele on 8 November 1917, at the age of 38. The slow left armer had taken over 2,500 wickets in all first-class cricket and 100 wickets in 19 Tests for England. He was a Wisden Cricketer of the Year in 1904. He is buried at Oxford Road Cemetery in Belgium and his shrapnel punctured wallet rests in the pavilion at Kent's St Lawrence Ground in Canterbury.
- Tibby Cotter of the Australian 12th Light Horse was killed in action in October 1917 by Turkish fire. Before his last action, he tossed up a cricket ball of mud and said to a friend "That's my last bowl, blue. Something's going to happen." He had been one of the great early fast bowlers of Test cricket, playing 21 games and taking 89 wickets, renowned for bowling an intimidating length at high pace. He hit an ageing W.G. Grace with a beamer the first time he faced him and refused to stop bowling at Grace's body, despite the great man's request, causing W.G. to walk off in disgust. To quote the account of the National Army Museum:
  In April 1915 Cotter enlisted with the Australian Imperial Force. He joined the 1st Australian Light Horse Regiment, taking part in the Gallipoli campaign in 1915. Cotter later transferred to the 12th Australian Light Horse and was commended for his 'fine work under heavy fire' during the Second Battle of Gaza in 1917. On 31 October 1917 the 4th Light Horse Brigade, of which the 12th were part, captured Beersheba in a Brilliant cavalry charge. Trooper Cotter, serving as a stretcher-bearer, was shot dead by a sniper as the troops dismounted to engage the enemy.
  Cotter was buried in the Negev desert, 2 miles south of Beersheba.
- Two of the famed South African 'googly quartet' fell in the fighting. Gordon White died of his wounds in Palestine in October 1916 at the age of 36. He had played 17 Tests for his country, scoring two centuries with a best of 147. Major Reggie Schwarz died in Étaples, France on 18 November 1918, seven days after the Armistice. He had fought in German South-West Africa (Note: now Namibia) been wounded twice in action and fell victim, at 43, to the influenza epidemic which swept through a war ravaged world. He was a major in the King's Royal Rifle Corps and had won the Military Cross.
- Second Lieutenant Major Booth of the West Yorkshire Regiment was killed in action in July 1916 on the first day of the Somme Offensive, aged 29, when Britain lost 50,000 soldiers killed or wounded. Booth (Note: his Christian name was Major) had been one of Yorkshire's leading all-rounders and bowled unchanged with Alonzo Drake in consecutive matches in August 1914 as cricket drew to a close. He had taken 181 wickets in all first-class cricket in 1913, being consequently named a Wisden Cricketer of the Year for 1914, and 141 for Yorkshire in the last season before the war. After joining up, he had been commissioned as a Second Lieutenant and first served in Egypt in 1915 before being assigned to the Western Front. He was killed near La Cigny on the Somme on 1 July 1916, while serving with the 15th (S) Battalion, The West Yorkshire Regiment (Prince of Wales's Own), also known as 'The Leeds Pals'. He was buried at Serre Road Cemetery.
- Reginald Hands died on the Western Front on 20 April 1918 in France. He had played his only Test for South Africa in 1914 against England at Port Elizabeth. He won a rugby Blue at Oxford University, as did his brothers.
- Lieutenant Kenneth Hutchings of the King's Liverpool Regiment, attached to the Welsh Regiment, was killed in action by an exploding shell in September 1916. The Kent and England batsman had scored 21 first-class centuries, won seven caps for his country, and been a Wisden Cricketer of the Year in 1907. Remembered as one of the most graceful batsmen of the Edwardian age, he helped Kent win the County Championship three times (Note: Kent actually won the Championship four times between Hutchings' debut and the outbreak of war, but he had dropped out of the team before the 1913 season.) and scored 126 at Melbourne on England's 1907/08 Ashes tour.
- Bill Lundie was killed on 12 September 1917 on the killing fields of Passchendaele in Belgium. He was a South African cricketer who had played in one Test in 1914 against England, at Port Elizabeth, when he bowled 46 overs into a strong wind, taking 4 for 106.
- Second Lieutenant Leonard Moon died from his wounds on 23 November 1916, near Karasouli in Salonica, Greece while fighting with the Devon Regiment. He scored seven first-class hundreds while playing for Cambridge University from 1897 to 1900 and Middlesex from 1899 to 1909. He played four Tests for England against South Africa in 1905–06.
- Private Claude Newberry died 1 August 1916 aged 27, and is buried at the Delville Wood Cemetery, Somme, France. He played four Tests for South Africa in 1913 and 1914.
- Corporal Arthur Edward Ochse died 11 April 1918 aged 48, he was killed in action on the Western Front. He appeared in South Africa's debut Test match against England in 1889.

=== First-class cricketers ===
- Norman Callaway made his first-class debut at the age of 18 in February 1915 for New South Wales in Sydney against Queensland. Coming to the wicket with the score on 17 for 3, he reached his fifty in an hour and reached his century just half an hour later. He was finally dismissed the following day after for 207. First class cricket was then abandoned in Australia until the end of the war by which time Callaway had been killed in the Second Battle of Bullecourt in France in 1917. By dint of his only innings, he has the highest first class average on record.
- Henry Keigwin was a batsman who scored heavily for Peterhouse College while at Cambridge and played 11 first class matches for Essex and others. He played for the Gentlemen against Surrey in W.G. Grace's last first class game in April 1906, scoring 77 and 27. He left England for Africa but returned at the outbreak of war to serve with the Lancashire Fusiliers and was killed in action on the Western Front.
- Second Lieutenant William Burns of the Worcestershire Regiment was killed in action at Contalmaison in France in July 1916 aged 32. He had been a fine batsman in 217 matches for Worcestershire, scoring 196 in a stand of 393 with Ted Arnold at Edgbaston in 1909, and a ferocious fast bowler who took 214 wickets with a rather dubious action.
- Percy Jeeves of the Royal Warwickshire Regiment was killed in action in July 1916. A Yorkshireman who bowled for Warwickshire and was tipped by Plum Warner for England honours, his name was taken by P. G. Wodehouse, a noted cricket fan, for his famous fictional manservant as a memorial to his loss. Wodehouse had seen the medium-fast bowler bowl just once, in a match against Gloucestershire at Cheltenham on 22 July 1913.
- Lieutenant Harold Garnett of the South Wales Borderers was killed in action in December 1917, aged 38. He had been a left-handed batsman for Lancashire CCC, hitting 1,758 runs in 1901. He had toured Australia in 1901–02, left cricket to pursue business in Argentina, then returned to the game as a wicket-keeper. He played 152 first class games for Lancashire CCC and was among the first cricketers to volunteer in 1914.
- Second Lieutenant William Odell, MC, of the Sherwood Foresters, was killed in action in October 1917 aged 31 at Passchendaele in Belgium. He had been a fine medium-pace bowler for Leicestershire and London County Cricket Club who twice took eight wickets in an innings in his 193 first-class matches.
- Cecil Abercrombie was killed on 31 May 1916 at the Battle of Jutland while serving on HMS Defence. A right-handed batsman and right arm medium pacer, he had played for Hampshire County Cricket Club in 1913. He averaged over 40 and scored four first class centuries in just 16 matches with a highest score of 165 against Essex. He also played for the Army and Navy in 1910 and the Royal Navy in 1912 and 1913. He was awarded his county cap and died at 30 years old.
- Alfred Hartley R.G.A. was killed in action near Maissemy, France, aged 39 in October 1918. He had been a useful batsman for Lancashire, scoring 234 against Somerset in 1910, his best season. He is one of the few county cricketers to have been born in the US, in New Orleans.
- New Zealander Rupert Hickmott, an opening batsman who played 17 matches for Canterbury and died aged 22 on the Somme in 1916 while fellow countryman George Wilson, a left-arm spinner for Canterbury who played just 6 matches and yet twice took 10 wickets in a match, died in Flanders on 14 December 1917 at the age of 28.
- Cecil Banes-Walker, of the 2nd Devonshire Regiment who made five first-class appearances for Somerset was killed in action aged 26 between 6:45 and 7:30 on 9 May 1915 as his battalion advanced to provide support during the Battle of Aubers Ridge.
- George Whitehead was Captain of the Clifton College XI in 1913 and 1914 he had made 259 not out against Liverpool and was killed a month before the end of the war, serving with the Royal Flying Corps.
- Frank Bingham played one match for Derbyshire in the 1896 season He was a doctor and a Territorial Army officer, and in the First World War served as a combatant rather than as a military doctor. He was a lieutenant in the 5th Battalion, King's Own Royal Regiment (Lancaster) and became a captain in 1914 and commanded a company. He took part in the Second Battle of Ypres and was killed on 22 May 1915 on a reconnaissance mission after stopping to dig a man out of a collapsed trench. He is commemorated on the Menin Gate.
- Charles Bassett Fleming played one match for Derbyshire in the 1907 season. He died at Grévillers, France on 22 September 1918.
- Geoffrey Jackson played for Derbyshire from 1912 to 1914, and for Oxford University in 1914. He was given a commission in the Rifle Brigade on the outbreak of World War I and went to France in October 1914. He was invalided home, after the Second Battle of Ypres, suffering from gas poisoning and spent some months in England serving his Reserve Battalion. He returned to France, as Adjutant of the 1st Battalion, in December 1915, and was Mentioned in Despatches on 1 January 1916. He served continuously until his death on 9 April 1917 at the Battle of Arras. He was mortally wounded by a piece of shell after advancing about 6,000 yards (5,500 m), and died at Faimpoux, Arras, Belgium before reaching the dressing station.
- Charles Newcombe played one first-class cricket match for Derbyshire in the 1910 season, and also played league football for Chesterfield F. C. and Rotherham Town. He served in the First World War in the 7th Bn King's Own Yorkshire Light Infantry as a lieutenant and was killed in action at Fleuraix in France on 27 December 1915. He was buried at Y Farm Military Cemetery, Bois-Grenier.
- Edward Shaw played for Oxford University from 1912 to 1914. He served with the Oxford and Buckinghamshire Light Infantry as a temporary captain and was killed in action near Le Sars during the Battle of the Somme on 7 October 1916.
- Guy Wilson played one first class match for Derbyshire in 1902 and one in 1905. He was killed in action during the Battle of Cambrai on 30 November 1917.

=== Additional losses ===
- A. E. J. Collins died at the age of 29 at the First Battle of Ypres on 11 November 1914. He is still famous for recording cricket's highest ever individual score, smashing 628 not out as a thirteen-year-old in a house match in June 1899 over the course of four afternoons. He joined the British Army in 1902 and studied at the Royal Military Academy, Woolwich before becoming an officer in the 5th Field Company of the Royal Engineers. He had been Mentioned in Dispatches for action before his loss. His body was never found but his name is recorded at the Menin Gate Memorial in Belgium. His younger brother Herbert, a lieutenant in the 24th Battalion of the Manchester Regiment and a fellow old Cliftonian. was also killed in action, on 11 February 1917, aged 27. Collins's wife, Ethel, lived as a widow for over fifty years.
- George Marsden-Smedley, of the 3rd Battalion Rifle Brigade, who had captained Harrow School's first XI in 1915, was killed in action on 18 August 1916. A memorial seat was placed overlooking the Harrow School Cricket ground, its inscription reading 'To love the game beyond the prize'.

=== Others wounded ===
Other cricketers were seriously wounded in the fighting, which in many cases had a serious effect on their cricketing careers.

- Harry Lee, the Middlesex batsman was reported killed in action in 1915, soon after enlisting, and a memorial service was held in his honour. He had been shot in the leg at the Battle of Aubers Ridge and lay for three days between the lines before being taken into German custody and repatriated as a hopeless case. His leg, although shortened and withered, recovered enough for him to make a century at Lancing in 1917. Unable to serve again in the forces he took a position in 1917 as cricket and football coach to the Maharajah of Cooch Behar and was booked to sail to India on the S.S. Nyanza. At the last moment his passage was switched to the Nagoya: the Nyanza was torpedoed just out of Plymouth. He went on to play 437 first-class games and one Test for England against South Africa at Johannesburg in February 1931.
- Frank Chester, who later became a famous and highly respected umpire, was not so fortunate, having his playing career shattered when he lost his right arm below the elbow in fighting around Salonika in Greece in the summer of 1917 at the age of 21. He had been the youngest professional in the first class game when he joined Worcestershire in 1912 at the age of 16, scored 703 runs including 3 centuries and took 44 wickets with his off breaks in 1913 and scored 924 runs in 1914 with a best of 178 against Essex, hitting 4 sixes of England captain Johnny Douglas. As an umpire, he always counted the balls with six small pebbles picked up from his mother's garden at Bushey before he stood in his first match.
- Jack Massie, son of Hugh Massie, had been a promising left arm fast bowler tipped for Test honours before the war, with Johnny Moyes considering him the finest of the type he had ever seen. He took 99 wickets in 16 first-class matches for New South Wales from 1910/11 to 1913/14 but was seriously injured in action. He was decorated for 'conspicuous ability, initiative, resourcefulness and devotion to duty.
- Dudley Rippon was badly wounded during the Gallipoli Campaign and was discharged as a result. He returned to Somerset for the 1919 season, but only managed one match in the following summer of 1920 and, badly trouble by the effects of his wounds did not play any further cricket.

== A changed game ==
The County Championship resumed in England in 1919, with the counties agreeing to a brief and unsuccessful experiment with two-day county matches. It was not only the playing ranks which had been thinned by four years of slaughter. Worcestershire County Cricket Club mounted a roll of honour, in the form of a wooden plaque, in the pavilion at New Road to list and remember the seventeen members of the club who died in the Great War. It is still at the club.

== See also ==
- 1915 to 1918 English cricket seasons
- Cricket in World War II
