= Derbyshire County Cricket Club in 1895 =

English county cricket season

Derbyshire County Cricket Club seasons
1895 season
- Captain: Sydney Evershed
- County Championship: 5
- Most runs: William Chatterton
- Most wickets: George Davidson
- Most catches: William Storer

Derbyshire County Cricket Club in 1895 was the first season in which the English county cricket club Derbyshire played in the County Championship which had been established in 1890. The club settled their place by coming fifth with five championship wins. It was the club's 25th season although the matches in the period between 1888 and 1893 were not given first-class status. Matches in 1894 were accorded first class status, but were not included in the County Championship.

== 1895 season ==
Derbyshire joined the County Championship, together with Essex, Leicestershire, Warwickshire and Hampshire. Derbyshire played 16 games in the County Championship, and one match against MCC. They won six matches altogether and drew seven. Brewer's son Sydney Evershed was in his fifth season as captain. William Chatterton was top scorer although George Davidson had a better average and took most wickets with 93 (79 in the championship).

Making their entry in the Championship, the club tried out a large number of players, all of whom played less than 20 games for the club. John Berwick lasted longest as a regular player, while John Hall and Henry Blackwell appeared infrequently over several seasons. John Goodall, John Bennett and Joseph Brooks played in 1895 and in 1896, while Harry Storer and Thomas Richardson only played in the 1895 season. Jesse Boot and Harry Spencer played only one match.

=== Matches ===
List of matches
No.	Date	V	Result	Margin	Notes
1	13 May 1895	Warwickshire; At Edgbaston	Drawn		AFA Lilley 139; HW Bainbridge 104; HJ Pallett 8–69
2	20 May 1895	MCC; At Lord's	Won	42 runs	F Martin 6–22; W Mead 6–90
3	3 Jun 1895	Hampshire; At County Ground, Southampton	Lost	Innings and 79 runs	T Soar 7–49; H Baldwin 5–61
4	10 Jun 1895	Warwickshire; At County Ground, Derby	Won	201 runs	GA Davidson 9–39
5	20 Jun 1895	Yorkshire; At Headingley	Won	107 runs	
6	24 Jun 1895	Leicestershire; At County Ground, Derby	Drawn		W Chatterton 127; G Porter 5–67
7	1 Jul 1895	Nottinghamshire; At County Ground, Derby	Drawn		GA Davidson 6–45; W Flowers 7–69; JW Bennett 5–40
8	8 Jul 1895	Yorkshire; At County Ground, Derby	Lost	171 runs	H Bagshaw 127*; S Evershed 112; S Haigh 5–73; JW Bennett 5–101; FW Milligan 6–26
9	11 Jul 1895	Nottinghamshire; At Trent Bridge	Drawn		A Shrewsbury 143;
10	15 Jul 1895	Essex; At County Ground, Leyton	Lost	134 runs	GA Davidson 5–43; CJ Kortright 7–50 & 6–53; G Porter 5–80
11	18 Jul 1895	Surrey; At Kennington Oval	Drawn		T Richardson 6–100; GA Davidson 5–72
12	29 Jul 1895	Surrey; At County Ground, Derby	Lost	Innings and 53 runs	T Richardson 5–27 & 6–33; George Porter 5–67
13	1 Aug 1895	Lancashire; At Old Trafford, Manchester	Drawn		GA Davidson 6–67
14	5 Aug 1895	Hampshire; At County Ground, Derby	Won	Innings and 50 runs	G Porter 7–52 & 7–49; H Baldwin 5–76
15	8 Aug 1895	Leicestershire; At Grace Road, Leicestershire	Won	127 runs	W Sugg 104*; F Wright 5–78; GG Walker 9–68; F Geeson 5–94
16	19 Aug 1895	Lancashire; At County Ground, Derby	Won	63 runs	W Storer 108; AW Mold 7–57; GA Davidson 8–25; G Porter 5–55
17	26 Aug 1895	Essex; At County Ground, Derby	Drawn		H Bagshaw 99; JW Bennett 5–8;

== Statistics ==
=== County Championship batting averages ===
Name	Matches	Inns	Runs	High score	Average	100s
H Bagshaw	15	25	701	127*	30.47	1
W Chatterton	16	28	787	127	29.14	1
W Storer	15	24	618	108	29.09	1
G Davidson	15	25	641	79	26.70	0
SH Evershed	11	17	442	112	26.00	1
W Sugg	16	27	590	104*	24.58	1
LG Wright	16	27	555	90	20.55	0
J Goodall	1	2	36	32	18.00	0
GG Walker	13	19	225	48	17.30	0
JW Bennett	12	19	227	43	13.35	0
G Porter	14	23	234	93	13.00	0
H Storer	6	10	92	35	10.22	0
JJ Hulme	3	5	43	21	8.60	0
GA Marsden	2	4	28	17	7.00	0
C Evans	3	5	34	11	6.80	0
TH Richardson	3	5	34	11	6.80	0
JA Berwick	3	6	26	13	6.50	0
S Hill-Wood	3	5	21	7*	7.00	0
J Boot	1	2	4	4	2.00	0
J Brooks	3	3	2	2*	2.00	0
JP Hall	2	4	3	2	1.00	0
F Mycroft	1	2	1	1	0.50	0
H Spencer	1	1	0	0	0.00	0
S Malthouse	1	1	1	1*	–	0

Additionally Henry Blackwell played in the non County Championship match against MCC making a total of 2 runs.

=== County Championship bowling averages ===
Name	Balls	Runs	Wickets	BB	Average
G Davidson	4587	1397	89	9–39	15.68
G Porter	3488	1273	70	7–49	18.19
GG Walker	1679	912	38	9–68	24.00
JW Bennett	1307	465	29	5–8	16.03
W Sugg	535	299	10	3–12	29.90
JJ Hulme	745	357	9	3–32	39.56
C Evans	555	286	6	3–93	47.66
H Bagshaw	145	81	4	2–27	20.25
W Chatterton	81	55	2	1–7	27.50
JP Hall	86	40	2	1–12	20.00
J Brooks	110	63	1	1–22	63.00
W Storer	75	31	1	1–23	31.00
JA Berwick	45	12	0	–	–
Samuel Malthouse	110	41	0	–	–
H Storer	25	13	0	–	–

=== Wicket Keeping ===
Name	Matches	Catches	Stumpings
William Storer	16	38	3
Frank Mycroft	1	1	0

== See also ==
- Derbyshire County Cricket Club seasons
- 1895 English cricket season
