= Harold Mead =

English cricketer

Personal information
- Full name: Harold Mead
- Born: 13 June 1895; Walthamstow, Essex, England
- Died: 13 April 1921 (aged 25); Bell Common, Essex, England
- Batting: Right-handed
- Bowling: Slow left-arm orthodox
- Relatives: Walter Mead (father)

Career statistics
Competition	First-class
Matches	4
Runs scored	19
Batting average	3.16
100s/50s	–/–
Top score	8*
Balls bowled	334
Wickets	3
Bowling average	64.66
5 wickets in innings	–
10 wickets in match	–
Best bowling	2/84
Catches/stumpings	3/–
- Source: Cricinfo, 24 October 2011

Harold Mead (13 June 1895 − 13 April 1921) was an English cricketer. Mead was a right-handed batsman who bowled slow left-arm orthodox. He was born at Walthamstow, Essex.

Mead made his first-class debut for Essex against Derbyshire in the 1913 County Championship. He made three further first-class appearances for the county, the last of which came against Sussex in the 1914 County Championship.

With the ball, he took just 3 wickets at an average of 64.66, with best figures of 2/84. In his four first-class appearances, he scored 19 runs at a batting average of 3.16, with a high score of 8 not out. His brief first-class career came to an end with the start of World War I.

Mead fought in the war as a Private in the Essex Regiment. He was severely wounded in 1915 and never fully recovered, dying on 13 April 1921 at Bell Common, Essex.

He was the son of England Test cricketer Walter Mead.
