= Dick Young (cricketer) =

English cricketer

Personal information
- Full name: Richard Alfred Young
- Born: 16 September 1885; Dharwad, Bombay Presidency, British India
- Died: 1 July 1968 (aged 82); Hastings, Sussex, England
- Batting: Right-handed
- Bowling: Leg break
- Role: Wicket-keeper
- Relatives: John Young (brother)

International information
- National side: England
- Test debut (cap 156): 13 December 1907 v Australia
- Last Test: 21 February 1908 v Australia

Domestic team information
- Years: Team
- 1905–1908: Cambridge University
- 1905–1925: Sussex

Career statistics
| Competition | Test | First-class |
|---|---|---|
| Matches | 2 | 139 |
| Runs scored | 27 | 6,653 |
| Batting average | 6.75 | 28.80 |
| 100s/50s | 0/0 | 11/38 |
| Top score | 13 | 220 |
| Balls bowled | 0 | 150 |
| Wickets | – | 3 |
| Bowling average | – | 38.00 |
| 5 wickets in innings | – | 0 |
| 10 wickets in match | – | 0 |
| Best bowling | – | 2/32 |
| Catches/stumpings | 6/– | 115/29 |
- Source: CricketArchive, 15 December 2022

Richard Alfred Young (16 September 1885 – 1 July 1968) was an English sportsman who played both cricket and association football for England.

As a cricketer he played as a batsman for Cambridge University from 1905 to 1908, and irregularly for Sussex from 1905 to 1925. He represented England in two Test matches on their 1907–08 tour of Australia. Young was a dual international winning a cap for the England amateur international side against Hungary.

Young was born at Dharwad, Kingdom of Mysore in British India in 1885. During World War I, Young would serve in the 6th Gloucesters and would be promoted to a captaincy there, and ultimately to the rank of captain in the main army.

== Cricket career ==
Young was educated at Repton School, captaining the school cricketeer in his final two years, before going up to King's College, Cambridge in 1904. He won cricket Blues in all four years as a student. In his first season of first-class cricket – 1905 – Young attracted immediate attention with an innings of 220 for Sussex against Essex at the Lyttleton Ground, in which his skill in cutting was especially noted. He scored 638 runs in half a season for Sussex at an average of 45.57. placing him third behind the incomparable C. B. Fry and H. J. Heygate, who only played in two matches before departing for Canada. In all matches Young score 1,170 runs for an average of 35.45.

In 1906 Young batted extremely well for Cambridge University, scoring 150 in the University Match against Oxford, and 523 runs at an average of 35 for the University. However, academic studies in July and August meant he could not play at all for a Sussex team who had previously lost Fry, K. O. Goldie and R. B. Heygate, and would fall from third to tenth in the County Championship. In 1907, Young missed four games for Cambridge, but nonetheless headed the university's average and helped defeat Oxford. However, after the university season when he played ten games for Sussex, Young's county record of 392 runs at 23.05 was regarded as disappointing. Nevertheless, Young was invited to tour Australia with the MCC in 1907–08 in August and accepted at once. In an exceptionally difficult tour due to disputes with leading professionals, Young would be chosen as wicket-keeper in two Tests, despite the presence of Joe Humphries and his comparative inexperience in the role in England. (Note: Young had never kept wicket for Sussex at the time due to the presence of Harry Butt.) Young did nothing in Australia, scoring only 266 runs for an average of 16.62 with a highest score of 59 and disappointing as a wicket-keeper, but would recapture his form at home for both Cambridge and Sussex in 1908 and scored 1,403 runs for an average of 35.

=== Post-Cambridge career ===
In 1909, due to his work as head of the Army at Repton, Young could play only four times in the holidays for Sussex and a couple of Festival games in September. Before the 1910 season, Young moved to Eton, but despite some expectations he would not play at all that year. He did play three times for Sussex late in the 1911 season, but it was clear during the following spring that he would not be available before the holidays. As it turned out, although Young did play for Eton House, he would not play a single first-class match between 1912 and 1914, although in 1913 he did play for Windsor Home Park, Old Reptonians, and MCC against the Public Schools.

In August 1919, however, after scoring 106 for Eastbourne against Old Eastbournians, Young would return to the Sussex eleven against Kent, and play all Sussex's remaining five matches of the season, though scoring only 114 runs in nine innings. Nonetheless, in 1920 Young was expected to play and again did so in August. This time he scored 383 runs in seven innings, besides keeping wicket in place of Street. Although he again came in as batsman and wicket-keeper for the 1921 season and scored 100 against Freeman when he was taking nine wickets for 87 and 124 against a formidable Australian Test attack, Young's play otherwise was disappointing and he averaged only 23 in the Championship.

Young would continue to play for Sussex in the Eton holidays for four more seasons, playing his last match for the county in 1925. His average of 32 headed the county's averages in 1922, and virtually the same figure placed Young second in 1923, but he would fall to only 20.41 in the exceedingly wet summer of 1924 and not play a single innings of fifty in his last August.

== Football ==
Young also played football for Cambridge University and played, as an amateur, for Corinthian F.C.

== Family ==
His brother was John Young, who also played first-class cricket for Sussex.

Young worked as a teacher of mathematics and cricket at Eton College. He died at Hastings in 1969. He was aged 82.
