= John Berwick =

John Berwick may refer to:

- John Berwick (cricketer)
- John Berwick (politician)
