= Walter Mead =

Walter Mead may refer to:

- Walter Russell Mead (born 1952), American academic and expert on American foreign policy
- Walter Mead (cricketer) (1868–1954), English cricketer
