= John Bennett (cricketer, born 1777) =

English cricket player (1777–1857)

John Bennett (1777 – July 1857) was an English professional cricketer who made 61 known appearances in important matches between 1797 and 1818. His cousin was James Bennett who played in five matches from 1798 to 1805. Not to be confused with John Bennett (Derbyshire cricketer)

== Career ==
Bennett was mainly associated with Hampshire but also represented England, Marylebone Cricket Club (MCC) and other teams. He played for the Players in the inaugural and second Gentlemen v Players matches in 1806.

He was a fast underarm bowler (hand unknown), a left-handed batsman and an occasional wicketkeeper. He was "an excellent field", generally at mid-wicket. As a batsman, Bennett was described as "a fine and free hitter". His bowling speed was reportedly "very fast".

== Personal life ==
John Bennett was a farmer who lived in Kingsley all his life. He was 6 feet (1.8 m) tall and "a stout, strongly built man". He suffered badly from gout for the last thirty years of his life.

== Bibliography ==
- Haygarth, Arthur (1996) [1862]. Scores & Biographies, Volume 1 (1744–1826). Kennington: Frederick Lillywhite. ISBN 978-19-00592-23-9.
- Haygarth, Arthur (1997) [1862]. Scores & Biographies, Volume 2 (1827–1840). Kennington: Frederick Lillywhite. ISBN 978-19-00592-23-9.
