= James Bennett (cricketer) =

English cricketer (1775–1855)

James Bennett (1775 – 31 March 1855) was an English professional cricketer who made 5 known appearances in historically important matches from 1798 to 1805. He was a cousin of the more famous John Bennett, who is not to be confused with the much later John Bennett.

James Bennett was mainly associated with Hampshire.

== Bibliography ==
- Haygarth, Arthur (1996) [1862]. Scores & Biographies, Volume 1 (1744–1826). Kennington: Frederick Lillywhite. ISBN 978-19-00592-23-9.
