= Walter Butterfield =

English cricketer

Personal information
- Born: 6 August 1870; Dewsbury, Yorkshire, England
- Died: 19 July 1954 (aged 83); West Bridgford.Nottinghamshire, England
- Batting: Right-handed
- Bowling: Right-arm medium

Domestic team information
- Years: Team
- 1896: Derbyshire
- FC debut: 14 May 1896 Derbyshire v Surrey
- Last FC: 4 June 1896 Derbyshire v Surrey

Career statistics
Competition	First-class
Matches	2
Runs scored	11
Batting average	2.75
100s/50s	0/0
Top score	7
Balls bowled	35
Wickets	1
Bowling average	20.00
5 wickets in innings	0
10 wickets in match	0
Best bowling	1/10
Catches/stumpings	0/–
- Source: CricketArchive, April 2012

Walter Butterfield (6 August 1870 – 19 July 1954) was an English first-class cricketer who played for Derbyshire in 1896.

Butterfield was born in Dewsbury, Yorkshire. He started playing for Allestree Cricket Club in 1894 where he was "head and shoulders" above most players of his time and was the first Allestree player to make a century and the club's only player to take all 10 wickets in a match. He made two appearances for Derbyshire during the 1896 season both innings defeats by Surrey. Butterfield was a right-handed batsman and played four innings in his two matches in which he made a total of eleven runs, seven of which came in one innings. He was a right-arm medium-pace bowler and took one first-class wicket in six overs for the loss of twenty runs.

Butterfield died in West Bridgford, Nottinghamshire aged 84.
