= Thomas Gould (cricketer) =

English cricketer

Personal information
- Full name: Thomas Gould
- Born: 26 September 1863; Brassington, Derbyshire, England
- Died: 30 March 1948 (aged 84); Burton-on-Trent, England

Domestic team information
- Years: Team
- 1896–1897: Derbyshire
- FC debut: 23 July 1896 Derbyshire v Essex
- Last FC: 19 August 1897 Derbyshire v Yorkshire

Career statistics
Competition	First-class
Matches	7
Runs scored	63
Batting average	7.87
100s/50s	0/0
Top score	16*
Balls bowled	465
Wickets	9
Bowling average	25.00
5 wickets in innings	0
10 wickets in match	0
Best bowling	4/45
Catches/stumpings	5/–
- Source: CricketArchive, April 2012

Thomas Gould (26 September 1863 — 30 March 1948) was an English cricketer who played for Derbyshire in 1896 and 1897.

Gould was born in Brassington, Derbyshire, the son of Mark Gould, a lead miner and later lime picker, and his wife Mary.

Gould debuted in the 1896 season against Essex when he was an economical bowler and made a good showing with the bat in the lower-middle order. He made one other appearance during that season in a match that was abandoned as a draw. In 1897 season, he achieved his best bowling performance of 4–45 against Sussex, but made little impression in the following match. Gould played 10 innings in 7 first-class matches with a top score of 18 not out and an average of 7.87. He took 9 wickets at an average of 25.0.

Gould died at the age of 84 in Burton-on-Trent.
