= Jesse Boot (cricketer) =

English cricketer

Personal information
- Full name: Jesse Boot
- Born: 18 March 1860; South Normanton, England
- Died: 1 March 1940 (aged 79); Chesterfield, England
- Batting: Right-handed

Domestic team information
- Years: Team
- 1895: Derbyshire
- Only FC: 8 August 1895 Derbyshire v Leicestershire

Career statistics
Competition	First-class
Matches	1
Runs scored	4
Batting average	2.00
100s/50s	0/0
Top score	4
Catches/stumpings	2/–
- Source: CricketArchive, March 2012

Jesse Boot (18 March 1860 – 1 March 1940) was an English cricketer who played first-class cricket for Derbyshire in 1895.

He appeared for Derbyshire in the 1885 season when he kept wicket in a match against Staffordshire which did not count as first-class. His only first-class appearance for Derbyshire came late the 1895 season, against Leicestershire in August. A middle-order batsman, he scored a duck in his first innings and just four runs in the next. He did not play for the side again.

Boot was a right-handed batsman and scored 4 runs in his first-class career. He was also a wicket-keeper, but not in the first-class game.

Boot died in Chesterfield just short of 80 years.
