= 1913 County Championship =

English cricket tournament

- Cricket format: First-class cricket
- Tournament format: League system
- Champions: Kent (4th title)
- Participants: 16
- Most runs: Jack Hobbs 2,238 for Surrey
- Most wickets: Major Booth 158 for Yorkshire

The 1913 County Championship was the twenty-fourth officially organised running of the County Championship. Kent County Cricket Club won their fourth championship title, and equalled Yorkshire's 1901 record of twenty wins in one season.

== Table ==
- Five points were awarded for a win.
- Three points were awarded for "winning" the first innings of a drawn match.
- One point was awarded for "losing" the first innings of a drawn match.
- Final placings were decided by calculating the percentage of possible points.

	County	Played	Won	Lost	First Innings			Points		%
	County	Played	Won	Lost	Won	Lost	No result	Poss	Obtd	%
1	Kent	28	20	3	3	1	1	135	110	81.48
2	Yorkshire	28	16	4	4	3	1	135	95	70.37
3	Surrey	26	13	5	4	4	0	130	81	62.30
4	Northamptonshire	22	12	4	1	5	0	110	68	61.81
5	Nottinghamshire	20	8	5	3	4	0	100	53	53.00
6	Middlesex	20	7	6	4	3	0	100	50	50.00
7	Sussex	28	10	10	4	3	1	135	65	48.14
8	Lancashire	26	7	11	7	0	1	125	56	44.80
9	Gloucestershire	22	8	11	1	2	0	110	45	40.90
10	Hampshire	26	7	11	4	4	0	130	51	39.23
11	Warwickshire	24	7	11	3	3	0	120	47	39.16
12	Worcestershire	20	6	9	1	3	1	95	36	37.89
13	Derbyshire	18	4	10	2	2	0	90	28	31.11
14	Leicestershire	22	4	13	1	4	0	110	27	24.54
15	Essex	18	2	9	2	4	1	85	20	23.52
16	Somerset	16	2	11	2	1	0	80	17	21.25

== Records ==
Most runs
Aggregate	Average	Player	County
2,238	52.04	Jack Hobbs	Surrey
2,146	48.77	Phil Mead	Hampshire
1,949	44.29	Wally Hardinge	Kent
1,804	42.95	James Seymour	Kent
1,609	40.22	Johnny Tyldesley	Lancashire

Most wickets
Aggregate	Average	Player	County
158	19.09	Major Booth	Yorkshire
154	19.31	Bill Hitch	Surrey
153	20.51	George Dennett	Gloucestershire
145	15.54	Colin Blythe	Kent
138	17.50	George Thompson	Northamptonshire

== Notable events ==
- Lancashire, after suffering severe financial losses despite a dry summer, would propose radical reductions in the county cricket fixture list. This would lead that club's committee to ultimately propose a reduction in county matches to two days. After increasing financial losses throughout county cricket the following season, this reduction would be carried out for 1919, (Note: After the 1914 season, World War I meant that no county cricket was played between 1915 and 1918) but was almost instantly considered a failure and a reversion to three-day matches took place for 1920.
