= Reginald Heygate =

English cricketer

Cricket information
- Batting: Right-handed

Career statistics
Competition	First-class
Matches	73
Runs scored	2,818
Batting average	28.46
100s/50s	3/19
Top score	136
Balls bowled	196
Wickets	4
Bowling average	25.50
5 wickets in innings	0
10 wickets in match	0
Best bowling	2/21
Catches/stumpings	38/–
- Source: Reginald Heygate at CricketArchive, 9 May 2022

Reginald Beaumont Heygate (13 May 1883– 24 April 1956) was an English cricketer who appeared in 73 first-class matches from 1902 to 1904 and 1909 to 1911 as a right-handed batsman who scored 2,818 runs with a highest score of 136 and took four wickets with a best performance of two for 21.

Heygate played for Epsom College between 1898 and 1901. In his last season at school Heygate scored 599 runs in nine innings (two not out) at an average of 85.57, which was regarded as exceptional given his limited support despite the fact that Epsom never played the strongest cricket schools. For 1902, Heygate was sought after by both Sussex and W.G. Grace’s London County team, but he played only ten matches, all for Sussex in May and August. Only with an innings of 95 against Gloucestershire did Heygate live up to his Epsom form, and he had a very modest average of 16.06 from seventeen innings. In 1903 on his sole appearance for London County, Heygate played a fine innings of 61 not out to help Sussex teammate Ranjitsinhji orchestrate an unlikely victory over Marylebone Cricket Club (MCC) and averaged 27 for ten innings in a very wet summer for Sussex despite playing no innings higher than 55.

In 1904, Heygate was disappointing apart from a score of 72 at The Oval, and owing to medical duties he was not seen even once in first-class cricket between 1905 and 1908, yet in 1909 and 1910 Reginald Heygate managed to spare the time to play a full season for Sussex. In each of those two years he scored just over a thousand runs, despite both summers being wet and unfavourable to Heygate’s style, which depended upon hard hitting in front of the wicket to an extent considered "old-fashioned" by contemporary observers.

Heygate's moderate defence on the sticky wickets common in his two full seasons explains why he failed in his one appearance for the Gentlemen on a Lord's wicket where shooters were more common at Lord's than at any time since the heavy roller was introduced in the 1870s. The hot and dry 1911 season, which would have suited his style much better, saw Heygate's work as a doctor take up more of his time, and he could play only twice that season and not at all subsequently. There were nonetheless expectations from The Argus that he would play frequently in 1919, and Reginald was originally listed in the Sussex eleven for the infamous opening match against Somerset at Taunton. (Note: This was the game in which Reginald's brother H. J., who played as a replacement for his elder brother, was ruled dismissed for taking too long to arrive at the wicket and the game resulted in a tie.) However, as it turned out he never did return to the Sussex eleven.

Reginald Heygate did however continue to play regularly for the Winsborough Green club until 1918, and was that club's president until 1932.

Following his retirement from county cricket, Heygate moved first to Bristol and then to Scotland where he practised as a doctor until his death in 1956.
