= Charles Middleton (cricketer) =

English cricketer

Personal information
- Full name: Charles Edward Middleton
- Born: 21 December 1868; Leeds, Yorkshire, England
- Died: 5 February 1938 (aged 69); Chesterfield, Derbyshire, England
- Batting: Right-handed
- Bowling: Leg-break

Domestic team information
- Years: Team
- 1896–1903: Derbyshire
- FC debut: 28 May 1896 Derbyshire v MCC
- Last FC: 16 July 1903 Derbyshire v London County

Career statistics
Competition	First-class
Matches	4
Runs scored	47
Batting average	6.71
100s/50s	0/0
Top score	21
Balls bowled	20
Wickets	0
Bowling average	–
5 wickets in innings	–
10 wickets in match	–
Best bowling	–
Catches/stumpings	0/–
- Source: CricketArchivr, April 2012

Charles Edward Middleton (21 December 1868 – 5 February 1938) was an English cricketer who played for Derbyshire between 1896 and 1903.

Middleton was born in Leeds, the son of Thomas Midleton, an engine fitter, and his wife Mary. He became an active member of Chesterfield Cricket Club.

Middleton played his debut first-class match for Derbyshire in the 1896 season against Marylebone Cricket Club, in a narrow victory for the team, though Middleton did not make a run and bowled only one over for the team. He played two County Championship appearances in the 1899 season, but in spite of Middleton's decent scores in the lower order, Derbyshire lost both games and ended the season at the bottom of the table. Middleton played just one further first-class match for the team, in the 1903 season. He was a right-handed batsman and played 8 innings in 4 first-class matches with a top score of 21 and an average of 6.71. He was a leg-break bowler who bowled 20 balls without taking a first-class wicket.

Middleton died at Queen's Park, Chesterfield, Derbyshire at the age of 69.
