= Harry Spencer (cricketer, born 1868) =

English cricketer

Personal information
- Born: 18 September 1868; Northowram, Yorkshire, England
- Died: 13 October 1937 (aged 69); Regent's Park, London, England
- Batting: Right-handed

Domestic team information
- Years: Team
- 1895: Derbyshire
- Only FC: 18 July 1895 Derbyshire v Surrey

Career statistics
Competition	First-class
Matches	1
Runs scored	0
Batting average	0.00
100s/50s	0/0
Top score	0
Catches/stumpings	0/–
- Source: CricketArchive, March 2012

Harry Spencer (18 September 1868 – 13 October 1937) was an English cricketer who played for Derbyshire in 1895.

Spencer was born in Northowram, in the West Riding of Yorkshire, and was the son of William Spencer, a grocer, and his wife Mary.

Spencer played a minor counties match for Staffordshire in July 1895. He played a first-class match for Derbyshire during the 1895 season against Surrey in July. He scored a duck in the first innings but the match was abandoned as a draw before he had a chance to bat in the second innings.

He was a right-handed batsman but scored no runs in first-class cricket.

Spencer died at Regent's Park, London at the age of 69.
