= Joseph Brooks (cricketer) =

English cricketer

Personal information
- Full name: Joseph Brooks
- Born: 10 September 1870; South Normanton, Derbyshire, England
- Died: 15 May 1937 (aged 66); Shuttlewood, Derbyshire, England
- Bowling: Left-arm medium fast bowler

Domestic team information
- Years: Team
- 1895–1896: Derbyshire
- First-class debut: 5 August 1895 Derbyshire v Hampshire
- Last First-class: 18 May 1896 Derbyshire v Nottinghamshire

Career statistics
Competition	First-class
Matches	5
Runs scored	8
Batting average	2,66
100s/50s	/
Top score	6
Balls bowled	267
Wickets	2
Bowling average	95.00
5 wickets in innings	0
10 wickets in match	0
Best bowling	1-22
Catches/stumpings	1
- Source: , October 2011

Joseph Brooks (10 September 1870 – 15 May 1937) was an English cricketer who played first-class cricket for Derbyshire in 1895 and 1896.

== Early years ==
Brooks was born at South Normanton, Derbyshire, the son of John Brooks, a coal miner, and his wife Maria.

== Career ==
He made his debut for Derbyshire in August 1895 against Hampshire when he made 2 not out in the only innings he played. He played two more games in the 1895 season and two in the 1896 season.

Brooks played seven innings in five first-class matches with an average of 2,66 and a top score of 6. As last man in, he was only given out three times in his career. He was a left-arm fast-medium bowler and took 2 wickets at an average of 95.00.

== Death ==
Brooks died at Shuttlewood, Derbyshire, at the age of 66.
