= John Young (cricketer, born 1884) =

English cricketer

Personal information
- Full name: John Villiers Young
- Born: 16 August 1884; Dharwar, Kingdom of Mysore, British India
- Died: 8 September 1960 (aged 76); Eastbourne, Sussex, England
- Relatives: Dick Young (brother)

Domestic team information
- Years: Team
- 1908: Sussex

Career statistics
Competition	First-class
Matches	3
Runs scored	105
Batting average	21.00
100s/50s	0/1
Top score	84
Balls bowled	30
Wickets	–
Bowling average	–
5 wickets in innings	–
10 wickets in match	–
Best bowling	–
Catches/stumpings	0/–
- Source: Cricinfo, 11 December 2011

John Villiers Young (16 August 1884 — 8 September 1960) was an English first-class cricketer.

Young was born in British India at Dharwar in August 1884. He was educated in England at Eastbourne College, where he played as an all-rounder for the college cricket team from 1901 to 1904, captaining the team in his final two years. From Eastbourne he went up to the University of Cambridge in 1906, where he spent a year before transferring to the University of Oxford, where he attended St John's College, Oxford; he had the distinction of appearing in freshman matches for both Cambridge and Oxford, but never appeared for either team's senior sides. Young appeared in three first-class cricket matches for Sussex in the 1908 County Championship, making appearances against Essex, Worcestershire, and Warwickshire. He scored 105 runs in his three matches at an average of 21.00, with a highest score of 84. After graduating from Oxford, Young entered into the Imperial Forestry Service in December 1909. He served in the First World War from May to August 1918 in the British Indian Army Reserve of Officers as a second lieutenant. He resumed his service in the Imperial Forestry Service after the war, retiring in February 1925. He later served as a councillor on Eastbourne Town Council for Hampden Park Ward from 1938. He died in hospital at Eastbourne in September 1960. His brother was Dick Young, who played Test cricket for England.
