= Harry Storer =

Harry Storer may refer to:

- Harry Storer Sr. (1870–1908), football (soccer) goalkeeper for Woolwich Arsenal and Liverpool
- Harry Storer Jr. (1898–1967), son of the above, also a footballer who played for Derby County and England and later became a manager, and a cricketer for Derbyshire
