= Thomas Richardson (cricketer) =

English cricketer

Personal information
- Full name: Thomas Haden Richardson
- Born: 4 July 1865; Tutbury, Staffordshire, England
- Died: 10 December 1923 (aged 58); Tutbury, Staffordshire, England
- Batting: Right-handed

Domestic team information
- Years: Team
- 1895: Derbyshire
- FC debut: 12 July 1888 England XI v Australians
- Last FC: 8 August 1895 Derbyshire v Leicestershire

Career statistics
Competition	First-class
Matches	4
Runs scored	49
Batting average	7.00
100s/50s	0/0
Top score	25
Catches/stumpings	5/–
- Source: CricketArchive, March 2012

Thomas Haden Richardson (4 July 1865 — 10 December 1923) was an English cricketer who played first-class cricket for Derbyshire in 1895.

Richardson was born at Tutbury, Staffordshire, the son of John T. H. Richardson and his wife Sarah Richards. His father was a flint glass manufacturer in the long-standing family business founded by Benjamin Richardson and in 1881 was based at Marston on Dove. Richardson appeared in a first-class match for the first time in 1888, playing in an England XI against a team of touring Australians. However, the England team lost the match by an innings margin, having scored just 28 runs in the first innings. Richardson played for Staffordshire from 1888 to 1892 and also for the Gentlemen of Staffordshire.

Richardson played for Derbyshire in the 1895 season, their first year in the County Championship. He made his debut in a match against Hampshire and played two further matches for the club, both in that year. His final first-class match was a victory against Leicestershire in August, in which teammate George Walker took nine wickets in the first innings and made 44 runs from tenth in the batting order. Richardson was a right-handed batsman and played 7 innings in 4 first-class matches. He made a top score of 15 and an average of 7.

Richardson died in Tutbury at the age of 58.
