= John Hall (cricketer, born 1874) =

English cricketer

Personal information
- Full name: John Peter Hall
- Born: 20 August 1874; Worksop, Nottinghamshire, England
- Died: 9 November 1925 (aged 51); Worksop, England
- Batting: Right-handed
- Bowling: Right-arm medium-fast

Domestic team information
- Years: Team
- 1895–1897: Derbyshire
- FC debut: 20 June 1895 Derbyshire v Yorkshire
- Last FC: 24 May 1897 Derbyshire v Surrey

Career statistics
Competition	First-class
Matches	4
Runs scored	3
Batting average	0.50
100s/50s	0/0
Top score	2
Balls bowled	216
Wickets	3
Bowling average	37.33
5 wickets in innings	0
10 wickets in match	0
Best bowling	1/12
Catches/stumpings	3/–
- Source: CricketArchive, March 2012

John Peter Hall (20 August 1874 – 9 November 1925) was an English cricketer who played for Derbyshire between 1895 and 1897.

Hall was born at Worksop, Nottinghamshire. His cricket career began in the 1895 when Derbyshire entered the County Championship. Hall scored one run in two innings in his debut match which Derbyshire won against Yorkshire and he made little impression apart from taking two catches, in his second game against Nottinghamshire, although the team went on to finish highly in the year's County Championship. Hall appeared only once during the 1896 season when he took a wicket against Warwickshire and played his last match in the 1897 season in an innings defeat to Surrey. He was a right-handed batsman who scored 3 runs in 7 innings and a right-arm medium-fast bowler who took 3 wickets at an average of 37.33.

Hall died at Worksop at the age of 51.
