= Harry Baldwin (cricketer) =

English cricketer

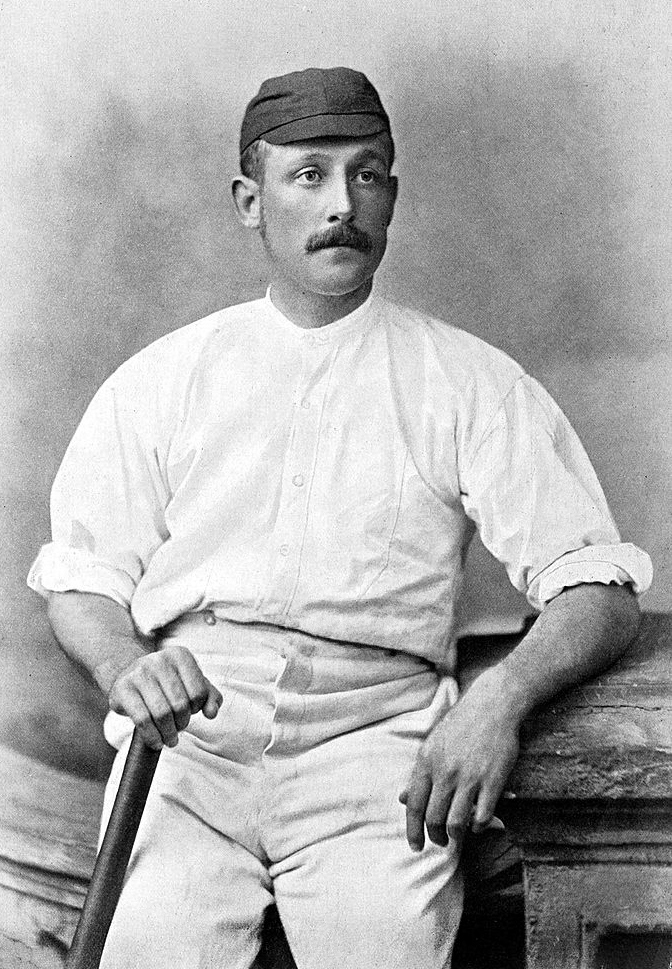
- Harry Baldwin c. 1895

Personal information
- Full name: Harry Baldwin
- Born: 27 November 1860; Wokingham, Berkshire, England
- Died: 12 January 1935 (aged 74); Hartley Wintney, Hampshire, England
- Height: 5 ft 6 in (1.68 m)
- Batting: Right-handed
- Bowling: Right-arm off break
- Relatives: Herbert Baldwin (son)

Domestic team information
- Years: Team
- 1877–1905: Hampshire

Umpiring information
- FC umpired: 62 (1892–1909)

Career statistics
Competition	First-class
Matches	151
Runs scored	1,873
Batting average	10.70
100s/50s	–/1
Top score	55*
Balls bowled	34,240
Wickets	580
Bowling average	24.79
5 wickets in innings	41
10 wickets in match	6
Best bowling	8/74
Catches/stumpings	54/–
- Source: Cricinfo, 26 December 2009

Harry Baldwin (27 November 1860 – 12 January 1935) was an English first-class cricketer and umpire. Playing first-class cricket for Hampshire as an off break bowler between 1877 and 1905, he took 580 wickets in 150 matches for the county, forming a prolific partnership with Thomas Soar. As an umpire, he stood in 62 matches between 1892 and 1909.

== Cricket and umpiring careers ==
Baldwin was born to a cricketing family at Wokingham in November 1860. He made his debut as an off break bowler in first-class cricket for Hampshire against Derbyshire at Southampton in 1877. Ten years would pass before he next played for Hampshire in 1887, by which time they had lost their first-class status. It was during Hampshire's period as a second-class county that he established his opening bowling partnership with Thomas Soar. When Hampshire regained their first-class status in 1895, Baldwin was 34 years of age and would be one of three players to have represented Hampshire before and after the loss of their first-class status (Russell Bencraft and Teddy Wynyard being the others). He took 114 wickets in 1895, at an average of 15.77 from seventeen matches. This tally included thirteen five wicket hauls and two ten wicket hauls in a match. Such was his partnership with Soar in 1895, that the pair took 191 of the 260 wickets Hampshire took in the season. Against Derbyshire that season, the pair bowled unchanged throughout the match, bowling over 100 overs between them. His form led to him being selected to represent the Players in the Gentlemen v Players fixture at The Oval. It is proffered by the cricket journalist Simon Wilde, that had Wisden decided to choose five Cricketers of the Year for 1896, instead of just W. G. Grace, that Baldwin would have been one of the five.

His good form continued into the 1896 season, with 73 wickets at an average of 26.36 from 17 matches, with seven five wicket hauls. His returns decreased the following season, with 56 wickets at an average of 27.14 from twenty matches. In 1898, Baldwin became the first Hampshire professional to be awarded benefit, having been granted his benefit by Russell Bencraft against Yorkshire in a ran-affected match in which there was no play on the first day and was concluded on the second with a Yorkshire victory, after Hampshire had been bowled out for scores of 42 and 36 in response to Yorkshire's 157. With play on the second day lasting six hours, it remains as of 2026 the only match in Hampshire's history to be concluded in a day. The lone day's play did not cover the expenses of playing the match, with the committee having to help raise just under £250 for his benefit. Later in the season, he took his career best match figures of 15 for 142 against Sussex, which is the fourth-best match return for a Hampshire bowler as of 2026. His season return for 1898 was 59 wickets at an average of 16.52, from fourteen matches. The following season, he took 79 wickets at an average of 27.91 from 21 matches, while his 22 matches in 1900 yielded 84 wickets at an average of 28.85. Baldwin struggled in the 1901 season, taking just 15 wickets at an average of 40.73 from ten matches, and was replaced in the side by Charlie Llewellyn. He did not subsequently play for Hampshire for the next two seasons, at a time when the fielded what is considered its weakest side. Baldwin would return to the Hampshire side in 1904, aged 44. Across the following two seasons he would make 28 appearances, taking exactly 100 wickets.

A portly figure who weighed over 12 stone (76 kg), he was a particularly effective off break bowler on pitches affected by rain, or that were worn. In 150 first-class matches for Hampshire, he took 580 wickets at an average of 24.71; he took 41 five wicket hauls and took ten wickets in a match on six occasions. A lower order batsman, he scored 1,863 runs at a batting average of 10.70, with one half-century, a score of 55 not out made in the 1905 County Championship against Worcestershire, with Baldwin sharing in a tenth wicket partnership of 87 with David Steele. Alongside his playing career, he also stood as an umpire from 1892 to 1909, standing in 62 matches; 58 of these came between 1907 and 1909.

Outside of cricket, he was involved in the family coachbuilding business at Hartley Wintney. Baldwin died at his home in Hartley Wintney in January 1935, following a long illness. His son, Herbert, played first-class cricket for Surrey and stood as a Test match umpire.
