= Herbert Baldwin (cricketer) =

English cricketer and Test match umpire

Personal information
- Full name: Herbert George Baldwin
- Born: 16 March 1893; Hartley Wintney, Hampshire, England
- Died: 7 March 1969 (aged 75); Hartley Wintney, Hampshire, England
- Batting: Right-handed
- Bowling: Leg-break
- Role: Umpire
- Relatives: Harry Baldwin (Father)

Domestic team information
- Years: Team
- 1922–1930: Surrey

Career statistics
Competition	FC
Matches	32
Runs scored	509
Batting average	13.39
100s/50s	–/1
Top score	63*
Balls bowled	672
Wickets	3
Bowling average	107.00
5 wickets in innings	–
10 wickets in match	–
Best bowling	2/83
Catches/stumpings	10/–
- Source: Cricinfo, 26 December 2009

Herbert George Baldwin (1893–1969) was a first-class cricketer and Test match umpire. Born in 1893 in Hampshire, Baldwin played 33 games for Surrey as a right-handed batsman and occasional leg break bowler with modest returns, although he was a noted fielder in the covers.

He umpired in first-class cricket for nearly three decades, including nine Tests after the war up until 1953. He called 19 no balls in 3 overs in Australia's match against Worcestershire in 1938 when fast bowler Ernie McCormick lost his run-up.

== Family ==
Baldwin was the son of Hampshire cricketer Harry Baldwin who represented Hampshire between 1877 and 1905. Harry, like his son, also stood as a first-class umpire.
