= John Berwick (cricketer) =

English cricketer

Personal information
- Full name: John Albert Berwick
- Born: 30 July 1867; Kingsthorpe, Northamptonshire, England
- Died: 31 July 1946 (aged 79); Glossop, England
- Batting: Left-handed
- Bowling: Left-arm medium-fast

Domestic team information
- Years: Team
- 1895–1901: Derbyshire
- FC debut: 3 June 1895 Derbyshire v Hampshire
- Last FC: 16 May 1901 Derbyshire v Surrey

Career statistics
Competition	First-class
Matches	16
Runs scored	138
Batting average	6.00
100s/50s	0/0
Top score	27
Balls bowled	1,704
Wickets	24
Bowling average	37.16
5 wickets in innings	2
10 wickets in match	0
Best bowling	5/61
Catches/stumpings	7/–
- Source: CricketArchive, March 2012

John Albert Berwick (30 July 1867 – 31 July 1946) was an English cricketer who played for Derbyshire between 1895 and 1901.

Berwick was born in Kingsthorpe, Northampton, the son of John Berwick, bootmaker and his wife Rebecca. He also worked in the boot making trade.

Berwick debuted for Derbyshire in the 1895 season against Hampshire, though he only made three appearances in that year and took no wickets. In 1898 he played minor county cricket for Northamptonshire. He returned to Derbyshire in the 1899 season as an effective bowler taking 5 for 82 against Yorkshire in his first game back in the side. He played nine matches that year, but only appeared twice each in the 1900 and 1901 seasons. In 1901 he achieved 5 for 61 against London County.

Berwick was a left-arm medium-fast bowler and took 24 first-class wickets at an average of 37.16 and a best performance of 5 for 61. He was a left-handed batsman and played 29 innings in 16 first-class matches with an average of 6.00 and a top score of 27.

Berwick died in Glossop, a day after his 89th birthday.
