= Frank Bingham =

English cricketer (1874–1915)

Personal information
- Full name: Frank Miller Bingham
- Born: 17 September 1874; Alfreton, Derbyshire, England
- Died: 22 May 1915 (aged 40); Ypres salient, Belgium
- Bowling: Right-arm medium

Domestic team information
- Years: Team
- 1896: Derbyshire
- Only FC: 28 May 1896 Derbyshire v MCC

Career statistics
Competition	First-class
Matches	1
Runs scored	17
Batting average	8.50
100s/50s	0/0
Top score	11
Catches/stumpings	0/–
- Source: CricketArchive, April 2012

Frank Miller Bingham (17 September 1874 – 22 May 1915) was an English medical doctor, all round sportsman and army officer who was killed in the First World War. As a cricketer, he played for Derbyshire in 1896.

== Life and cricket career ==
Bingham was born in Alfreton, Derbyshire, the son of Dr Joseph Bingham. He was educated at St Peter's School, York, and qualified as a doctor at St Thomas's Hospital.

Bingham made one first-class appearance for Derbyshire, against Marylebone Cricket Club during the 1896 season. He made seventeen runs, batting in the lower order. He also played rugby union for Blackheath F.C. and Middlesex. He was in practice at Alfreton for four years and then went to Lancaster.

== Military career and death ==
Bingham was an enthusiastic Territorial Army officer. He was first commissioned as a medical officer with the rank of lieutenant in the Royal Army Medical Corps on 24 March 1910, unusually he transferred to 5th Battalion, King's Own Royal Regiment (Lancaster) on 26 November 1910 as a line officer, and so in the First World War served as a combatant rather than as a military doctor. He was promoted captain in 1914 and commanded a company. He took part in the Second Battle of Ypres in May 1915 and was killed on a reconnaissance mission after stopping to dig a man out of a collapsed trench. After digging the man out, Bingham and his men were spotted, and Bingham was shot in the heart, killing him instantly. He has no known grave, but is commemorated on the Menin Gate.
