= Harold Heygate =

English cricketer

Harold John Heygate, born at Wellingborough, Northamptonshire, on 4 August 1884 and died at Guildford, Surrey on 27 June 1937 was a cricketer of very minor distinction except in one respect: his role in his final first-class game led to a situation that is almost certainly unique and that caused a sensation at the time.

== Cricket career ==
Heygate's conventional cricket career can be dismissed in a few sentences. Educated at Epsom College alongside his elder brother Reginald, he was a right-handed opening batsman who played five times in first-class matches for Sussex between 1903 and 1905, when he left England for Canada. Only in one match, against Kent at Tonbridge in 1905, when he scored 80 and an undefeated 68, did he show any particular talent. After 1905, he did not play again in the years leading up to the First World War, though he appeared for Canada against the United States in 1908.

== The Heygate Incident of 1919 ==
Heygate's enduring fame rests on a single final appearance for Sussex in the match against Somerset at the County Ground, Taunton in May 1919.

County cricket in England resumed immediately after the First World War but first-class matches in the County Championship were restricted to two days only, and several sides struggled for players as servicemen waited to be discharged. Sussex travelled to Taunton short of a player due to the unavailability of his previously-chosen elder brother and Heygate, there as a spectator, was pressed into service. Since his last first-class cricket 14 years before, though, Harold had sustained leg wounds during the war and suffered badly from arthritis (rheumatism, according to Wisden).

The extent of his injuries became apparent as he was first excused fielding while Somerset made 243, and then batted at No 11, being bowled by Jack White for 0 as Sussex replied with 242. On the second day, according to the recollection of Jack MacBryan, recounted in David Foot's history of Somerset cricket, Sunshine, Sixes and Cider, Heygate remained in a blue serge suit with the implication that he would take no further part in the match.

However, Sussex then dismissed Somerset in the second innings for 103 and, wanting 105 to win the match, themselves faded to 48 for six wickets. There was then a pugnacious partnership of 55 that took the score to 103, when two wickets fell in successive deliveries. Another run was scored, bringing the two sides level, and then the ninth wicket was taken.

At that point, there was a hiatus, and accounts between Foot and Wisden vary. Both agree, however, that after some minutes had elapsed without Heygate appearing to bat, someone on the Somerset side appealed, and umpire Alfred Street, a respected Test match official, ruled that Heygate was out timed out, the Sussex innings was over and the match was a tie.

Foot's account has Heygate with pads strapped on top of his blue serge suit making a valiant but fruitless attempt to reach the wicket. Wisden, less detailed, merely remarked: "Whether or not Heygate would have been able to crawl to the wicket, it was very unsportsmanlike that such a point should have been raised.

The decision caused controversy in the press and elsewhere, much of it centring on the lack of civility to a wounded ex-serviceman. Nevertheless, an MCC committee upheld the umpire's decision and the result of the match stood. There being no "Timed Out" dismissal at the time – the Law was not introduced until 1980 – Heygate was recorded as "out, absent". More recent scorecards have shown him as "absent hurt".

Perhaps not surprisingly, Heygate did not play first-class cricket again. Neither his obituary in 1937 nor his mention in the 1938 Wisden makes any reference to the 1919 incident.

== The Timed Out Rule ==
MCC ruled that umpire Street was correct under the then Law 45 of the Laws of Cricket. At the time, this Law was part of a list of duties addressed to the umpires, and stated: "They shall allow two minutes for each striker to come in". Unlike the present Law 40, which allows for a specific dismissal method of "Timed Out", the old Law in 1919 did not specify what happened when an individual batsman failed to reach the wicket in the time allowed.

== See also ==
- Timed out for an explanation of the present and previous Laws.

== External sources ==
- Bailey, Philip; Thorn, Philip; Wynne-Thomas, Peter (eds.). "Heygate, Harold John". Who's Who of Cricketers. p. 476. ISBN 0-600-34692-7. and Bailey, Philip; Thorn, Philip; Wynne-Thomas, Peter (eds.). "Street, Alfred Edward". Who's Who of Cricketers. p. 973. both mention the incident
- "Harold Heygate". Cricket Archive.
- "Somerset v Sussex in 1919". Cricket Archive.
