= 1914 County Championship =

English cricket tournament

- Cricket format: First-class cricket (3 days)
- Tournament format: League system
- Champions: Surrey (7th title)
- Participants: 16
- Most runs: Jack Hobbs (2,499 for Surrey)
- Most wickets: Colin Blythe (159 for Kent)

The 1914 County Championship was the 25th officially organised running of the County Championship, and began on 2 May 1914. Originally scheduled to run until 9 September, the last two matches of the season (both involving Surrey) were cancelled due to the outbreak of World War I.

With the final positions in the table being calculated by the percentage of possible points gained, Surrey were named champions for the seventh time.

== Table ==
Five points were awarded for each win, three points were awarded to the team winning on first innings in a drawn match, and one point was awarded to the team losing on first innings in a drawn match. Defeats and abandonments scored no points.

Team	Pld	W	T	L	D	A	Pts	Pts%
Surrey	28	15	0	2	8	2	93	74.4
Middlesex	20	11	0	2	7	0	70	70.0
Kent	28	16	0	7	5	0	87	62.1
Yorkshire	28	14	0	4	10	0	86	61.4
Hampshire	28	13	0	4	11	0	82	58.6
Sussex	28	10	0	6	10	1	68	52.3
Warwickshire	24	9	0	7	8	0	61	50.8
Essex	24	9	0	9	6	0	59	49.2
Northamptonshire	22	7	0	6	8	1	51	48.6
Nottinghamshire	20	5	0	5	9	0	46	48.4
Lancashire	26	6	0	9	11	0	51	39.2
Derbyshire	20	5	0	12	3	0	34	34.0
Leicestershire	24	4	0	11	8	1	38	33.0
Worcestershire	22	2	0	13	6	0	22	21.0
Somerset	20	3	0	16	0	1	15	15.8
Gloucestershire	22	1	0	17	4	0	15	13.6

== Leading averages ==
Most runs
Aggregate	Average	Player	County
2,499	62.47	Jack Hobbs	Surrey
2,235	55.87	Phil Mead	Hampshire
1,933	46.02	Frank Woolley	Kent
1,828	76.16	J. W. Hearne	Middlesex
1,735	38.55	Wally Hardinge	Kent

Most wickets
Aggregate	Average	Player	County
159	15.03	Colin Blythe	Kent
148	20.09	Alec Kennedy	Hampshire
141	18.28	Major Booth	Yorkshire
135	16.36	Alonzo Drake	Yorkshire
126	19.76	Bill Hitch	Surrey

== See also ==
- 1914 English cricket season
