= Whitemoor, Nottingham =

Coordinates: 52.976°N 1.189°W

Whitemoor
- Location within Nottinghamshire
- Population: 4,447
- OS grid reference: SK 54450 42414
- Unitary authority: Nottingham
- Ceremonial county: Nottinghamshire
- Region: East Midlands
- Country: England
- Sovereign state: United Kingdom
- Post town: NOTTINGHAM
- Postcode district: NG8
- Dialling code: 0115
- Police: Nottinghamshire
- Fire: Nottinghamshire
- Ambulance: East Midlands
- UK Parliament: Nottingham North and Kimberley

Whitemoor is an area of the City of Nottingham. It lies next to Old Basford to the north, New Basford and Hyson Green to the east, Aspley to the west and Beechdale to the south. There is a primary school in the area, Whitemoor Academy (Primary and Nursery). There is a local doctors surgery and pharmacy. Local amenities include a hairdresser, corner shops, takeaways and pub. Nottingham City Transport serves the area via the 54, 70, 71, 78 and 79 services.
