= Thomas Soar =

English cricketer (1865–1939)

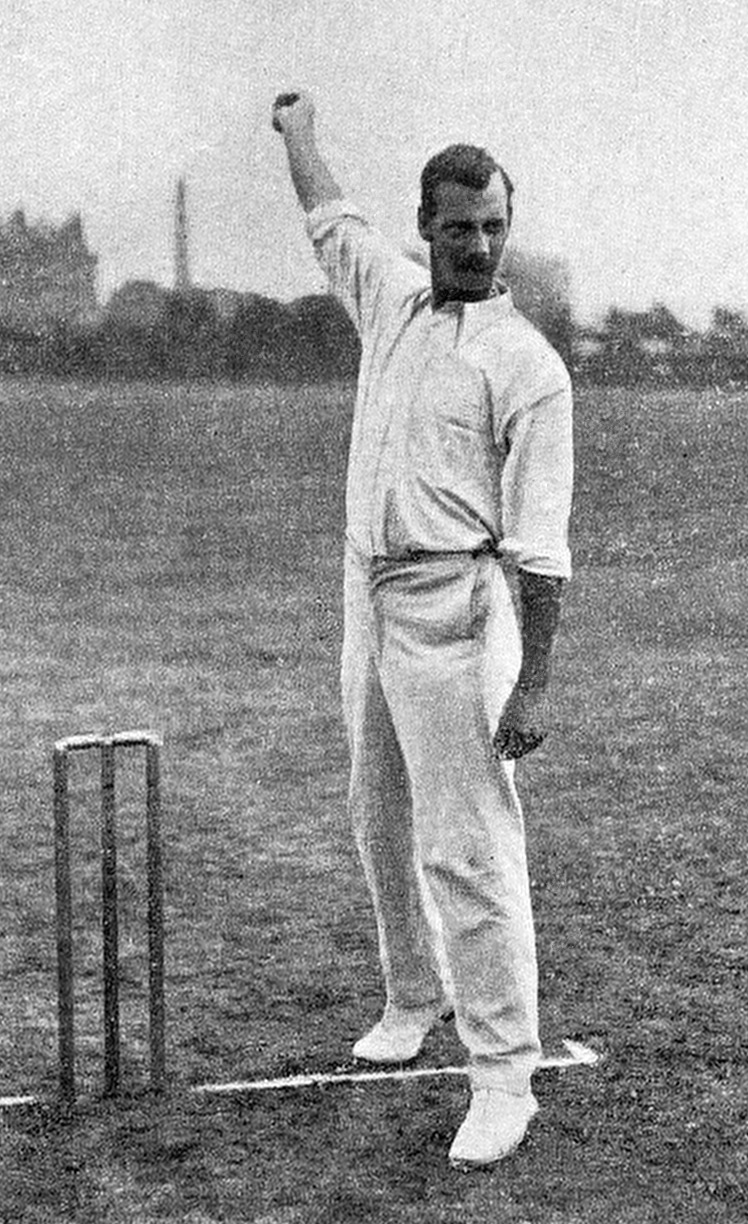
- Thomas Soar in 1899

Personal information
- Full name: Thomas Soar
- Born: 3 September 1865; Whitemoor, Nottinghamshire, England
- Died: 17 May 1939 (aged 73); Llandovery, Carmarthenshire, Wales
- Batting: Right-handed
- Bowling: Right-arm fast

Domestic team information
- Years: Team
- 1888–1904: Hampshire
- 1908–1911: Carmarthenshire

Career statistics
Competition	First-class
Matches	101
Runs scored	1,927
Batting average	13.38
100s/50s	–/5
Top score	95
Balls bowled	16,620
Wickets	323
Bowling average	23.82
5 wickets in innings	23
10 wickets in match	7
Best bowling	8/38
Catches/stumpings	49/–
- Source: Cricinfo, 21 February 2010

Thomas Soar (3 September 1865 — 17 May 1939) was an English first-class cricketer. Soar initially played an important part in facilitating Hampshire's readmission as a first-class county in 1895, forming a potent bowling partnership with Harry Baldwin. With Hampshire's return to first-class status in 1895 and their admission to the County Championship, he went onto make 101 first-class appearances, in which he took over 300 wickets and scored nearly 2,000 runs. He later coached cricket at Llandovery College in Wales, where he played minor counties cricket for Carmarthenshire.

== Career with Hampshire ==
Soar was born in September 1865 at Whitemoor, Nottinghamshire. Having failed to secure a contract with Nottinghamshire, he moved south and joined the staff at Hampshire (then a second-class county) as a groundskeeper at the County Ground in Southampton. He began playing second-class cricket for Hampshire in 1888 and quickly formed a successful bowling partnership with Harry Baldwin, with his fast bowling complimenting Baldwin's off breaks. His arrival at Hampshire coincided with the additions of Baldwin, Victor Barton, Ledger Hill, Charles Robson, and Teddy Wynyard to the Hampshire side, accelerating their return to first-class status for the 1895 season.

Soar subsequently made his first-class debut for Hampshire against Somerset at Taunton in the 1895 County Championship. Soar and Baldwin dominated the Hampshire bowling in 1895, taking 191 of the 260 Championship wickets Hampshire took that season; against Derbyshire, the pair bowled unchanged throughout the match, bowling over 100 overs between them. Making seventeen appearances in 1895, Soar took 95 wickets at an average of 17.95, taking eight five wicket hauls and ten wickets in a match on four occasions. The following season, he took 53 wickets from thirteen matches at an average of 24.56, which included his career-best figures of 8 for 38 against Essex. It was in 1896 that the business partnership he was involved in with Barton and another individual, as a manufacturers and vendors of cricket and athletics equipment, was dissolved. In 1897, his returns decreased with 31 wickets at an average of 35.67. He made three appearances late in the 1898 season, having injured himself prior to the start of the season and as a result missed most of it. After recovering from his injury, his bowling returns were more modest. In the season which followed, he made eleven appearances, taking 33 wickets at an average of 25.90.

Soar was granted a benefit match against Essex in 1900. However, the match would not prove a financial success, resulting in a £6 loss, due largely to rain and poor attendance. During the 1900 season, he would take 24 wickets at an average of 23.12 from eight matches. Around the time of his benefit, he also played club cricket for Paultons Park. The following season, he made a further eight appearances and took 22 wickets at an average of 18.86. In 1902, he made 25 wickets from fifteen matches at an average of 26.12, while the following season he took 35 wickets at an average of 18.44 from ten matches. Soar's final season came in 1904, when he made just four appearances. In 101 first-class appearances for Hampshire, he took 323 wickets at an average of 23.82, taking 23 five wicket hauls and ten wickets in a match on seven occasions. A capable lower order batsman, he scored 1,927 runs at an average of 13.38, making five half centuries. His highest score of 95 came against Somerset in 1899, when batting as a nightwatchman, he shared in a partnership of 196 for the fifth wicket with Robert Poore. This coincided with his best season with the bat, with 378 runs at a batting average of 23.62 (he scored 488 runs in his debut season, though at a lower average of 16.82).

== Later life ==
Following the end of his first-clas career, he briefly coached cricket at Winchester College, before moving to Wales in 1906 to take up the appointment of cricket coach at Llandovery College in Carmarthenshire. In Wales, he played minor counties cricket for Carmarthenshire in the Minor Counties Championship from 1908 to 1911, making six appearances. After the 1911 season, Carmarthenshire ceased to participate in minor counties cricket. Soar died at Llandovery in May 1939.
