= Derbyshire County Cricket Club in 1896 =

1896 season of an English cricket team

Derbyshire County Cricket Club seasons
1896 season
- Captain: Sydney Evershed
- County Championship: 7
- Most runs: William Storer
- Most wickets: John Hulme
- Most catches: William Storer

Derbyshire County Cricket Club in 1896 represents the cricket season when the English club Derbyshire had been playing for twenty five years. It was their second season in the County Championship and they came seventh.

== 1896 season ==
Derbyshire played 16 games in the County Championship, one match against MCC and one against the touring Australians. They won five matches in the County Championship and six matches altogether. Brewer's son Sydney Evershed was in his sixth season as captain. William Storer was top scorer, as well as keeping wicket and bowling to take 15 wickets. John Hulme took most wickets with 77 in the County Championship.

In a season marked by a number of high scores, with centuries both for and against Derbyshire Storer and George Davidson produced notable batting performances during the season. Davidson made 274 against Lancashire at Manchester which remains the Derbyshire individual batting record. In the same innings Chatterton and Storer also scored centuries. Against Yorkshire Storer hit centuries in each innings—a feat performed previously only by W. G. Grace, A. E. Stoddart and George Brann, giving him a season's batting average of over 57. Bagshaw added a third century against Yorkshire in the same match.

Of those who made their debuts in the season, Thomas Gould and Henry Curgenven also played in 1897. John Purdy and Charles Middleton played more seasons, but only occasionally. Walter Butterfield played only two matches in 1896 and Frank Bingham just one.

=== Matches ===
List of matches
No.	Date	V	Result	Margin	Notes
1	14 May 1896	Surrey; At County Ground, Derby	Lost	Innings and 15 runs	Hayward 229
2	18 May 1896	Nottinghamshire; At Trent Bridge	Lost	7 wickets	Gunn 135
3	25 May 1896	Hampshire; At County Ground, Southampton	Won	7 wickets	Ward 113
4	28 May 1896	MCC; At Lord's	Won	1 wicket	W Attewell 5-38; G Porter 5-50
5	04 Jun 1896	Surrey; At Kennington Oval	Lost	Innings and 57 runs	R Abel 109; G Lohmann 6-51
6	08 Jun 1896	Lancashire; At County Ground, Derby	Lost	37 runs	JJ Hulme 6-57; A Mold 5-58 and 7-46; G Davidson 5-49
7	15 Jun 1896	Nottinghamshire; At County Ground, Derby	Drawn		Gunn 207*; Hardstaffe 8-53
8	25 Jun 1896	Yorkshire; At County Ground, Derby	Drawn		W Storer 100 and 100*; H Bagshaw 115
9	29 Jun 1896	Leicestershire; At Grace Road, Leicestershire	Won	Innings and 147 runs	W Storer 142; G Davidson 6-53
10	02 Jul 1896	Yorkshire; Bramall Lane, Sheffield	Lost	9 wickets	Denton 113; W Storer 122; JJ Hulme 5-80; S Haigh 6-45 and 6-70
11	06 Jul 1896	Leicestershire; At County Ground, Derby	Drawn		H Bagshaw 121; Pougher 114
12	13 Jul 1896	Warwickshire; At County Ground, Derby	Won	10 wickets	R Lilley 132 and 6-46; G Davidson 5-62; JJ Hulme 7-44
13	20 Jul 1896	Australians; At County Ground, Derby	Drawn		Trott 141; Donnan 167; Hill 130; G Giffen 5-123
14	23 Jul 1896	Essex; At County Ground, Leyton	Drawn		W Chatterton 111
15	03 Aug 1896	Hampshire; At County Ground, Derby	Won	8 wickets	Kitchener 6-59
16	10 Aug 1896	Lancashire; At Old Trafford, Manchester	Drawn		W Chatterton 104; G Davidson 274; W Storer 116; J Briggs 6–185; JJ Hulme 5-94
17	17 Aug 1896	Essex; At County Ground, Derby	Lost	201 runs	JJ Hulme 6-98; Bull 5-68
18	24 Aug 1896	Warwickshire; At Edgbaston	Drawn		G Davidson 8-70

== Statistics ==
=== County Championship batting averages ===
Name	Matches	Inns	Runs	High score	Average	100s
W Storer	15	22	1091	142*	57.42	5
G Davidson	16	24	953	274	43.31	1
W Chatterton	16	26	890	111	40.45	2
H Bagshaw	13	20	628	121	34.88	2
SH Evershed	13	19	637	88	33.52	0
LG Wright	15	23	580	94	25.21	0
W Sugg	16	25	486	88	20.25	0
T Gould	2	1	16	16	16.00	0
GA Marsden	14	19	237	37	15.80	0
JJ Hulme	16	22	237	51*	11.85	0
W S Eadie	2	3	31	18	10.33	0
HG Curgenven	5	5	45	19	9.00	0
G Porter	14	20	112	55	7.00	0
JW Bennett	4	6	30	18	5.00	0
WB Delacombe	2	3	9	7	4.50	0
JH Purdy	5	6	13	10*	3.25	0
J Brooks	2	4	6	6	3.00	0
W Butterfield	2	4	11	7	2.75	0
J Goodall	1	1	2	2	2.00	0
GG Walker	2	3	8	8*	–	0
JP Hall	1	1	0	0	–	0

Additionally C Middleton and FM Bingham played in the non County Championship match against MCC. Middleton failed to score, but Bingham made seventeen runs in what was his only match for the club.

=== County Championship bowling averages ===
Name	Balls	Runs	Wickets	BB	Average
JJ Hulme	4555	1690	77	7-44	21.94
G Davidson	4721	1502	68	8-70	22.08
G Porter	2568	1029	29	4-56	35.48
W Storer	681	408	15	4-48	27.20
JH Purdy	462	203	8	3-53	25.37
JW Bennett	535	236	6	2-37	39.33
W Chatterton	205	107	3	2-16	35.66
W Sugg	355	274	3	2-19	91.33
H Bagshaw	360	177	3	2-38	59.00
HG Curgenven	220	119	2	1-16	59.50
W Butterfield	35	20	1	1-10	20.00
JP Hall	85	39	1	1-21	39.00
GG Walker	160	96	2	1-30	48.00
J Brooks	157	127	1	1-88	127.00
T Gould	55	20	0		
LG Wright	5	1	0		

=== Wicket Keeping ===
Name	Matches	Catches	Stumpings
William Storer	15	26	3
Levi Wright		7	1

== See also ==
- Derbyshire County Cricket Club seasons
- 1896 English cricket season
