= 1927–28 Plunket Shield season =

Cricket tournament in New Zealand

1927–28 Plunket Shield
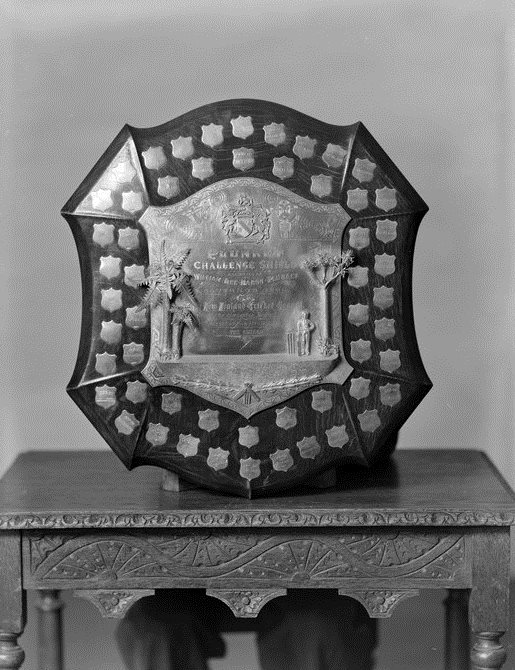
- The Plunket Shield trophy
- Cricket format: First-class
- Tournament format(s): Round-robin
- Champions: Wellington (3rd title)
- Participants: 4
- Matches: 6

The 1927–28 Plunket Shield season was a tournament of the Plunket Shield, the domestic first-class cricket competition of New Zealand.

Wellington won the championship, finishing at the top of the points table at the end of the round-robin tournament between the four first-class sides, Auckland, Canterbury, Otago and Wellington.

== Table ==
Below are the Plunket Shield standings for the season:

| Team | Played | Won | Lost | Drawn | NetRpW |
|---|---|---|---|---|---|
| Wellington | 3 | 3 | 0 | 0 | 15.222 |
| Canterbury | 3 | 2 | 1 | 0 | -0.353 |
| Auckland | 3 | 1 | 2 | 0 | -1.848 |
| Otago | 3 | 0 | 3 | 0 | -13.600 |
