= 1915 to 1918 English cricket seasons =

The 1915 to 1918 English cricket seasons were all but wiped out by the First World War.

The 1914 English cricket season ended prematurely after the outbreak of the war, and it was not until the 1919 season that first-class fixtures could resume.

However, cricket did not fade away during the war: it was played in schools and universities, on the streets, and by the soldiers and airmen on active service, whilst John Wisden's Cricketers' Almanac continued to publish every spring.

== 1915 ==
The 1915 County Championship was not officially abandoned until January. Surrey County Cricket Club, despite The Oval having been commandeered by the military, issued a statement that spring which "hoped that some matches may be played in July and August". It was a forlorn hope.

== 1916 ==
Club cricket in the south of England went into serious decline, and many clubs closed down indefinitely. In the north, efforts were made to keep the leagues alive, and the Bradford League did very well indeed, with large crowds reported, especially after Saltaire Cricket Club signed the great bowler Sydney Barnes.

== 1917 ==
Pelham Warner, at home on sick leave, had an idea to stage services charity matches at Lord's. These would involve Dominions teams against English servicemen. Colin Blythe played in one shortly before he was killed.

The number of games increased as cricket began to be viewed as a morale booster. Derek Birley recorded "as many as 119 services and schools games were played at Canterbury in 1917".

A Yorkshire County XII played two-day matches against teams representing the Bradford League and the Yorkshire Council League.

When the 1918 Wisden was published, it honoured the School Bowlers of the Year—Harry Calder, John Firth, Clement Gibson, Gerard Rotherham, and Greville Stevens.

== 1918 ==
The charity and holiday games continued in 1918. This was a second successive warm summer, and games were again well attended, especially league games with former county or Test professionals in action.

The 1919 Wisden honoured Five Public School Cricketers of the Year—Percy Adams, Percy Chapman, Adrian Gore, Lionel Hedges, and Norman Partridge. Chapman went on to captain England.

== Annual reviews ==
- John Wisden's Cricketers' Almanac – 1916 to 1919 editions
