= Walter Mead (cricketer) =

English cricketer (1868–1954)

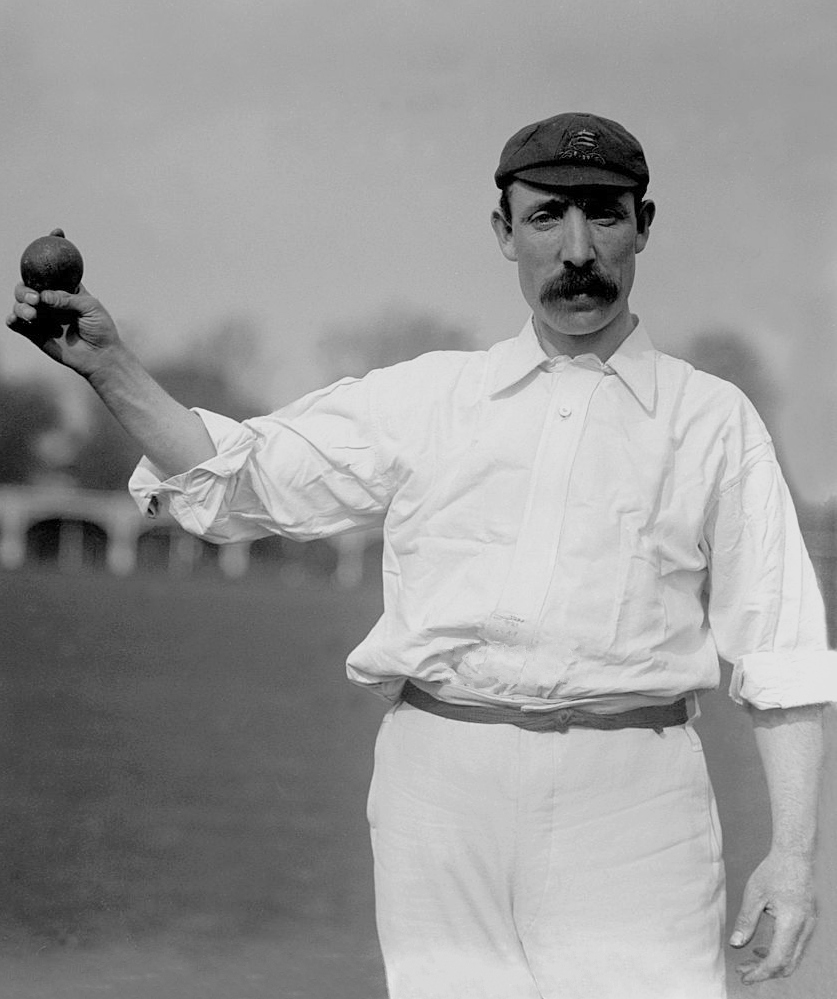
- Mead in about 1905

Personal information
- Born: 1 April 1868; Clapton, London, England
- Died: 18 March 1954 (aged 85); Shelley, Essex, England
- Batting: Right-handed
- Bowling: Right-arm offbreak, Legbreak

International information
- National side: England
- Only Test: 15 June 1899 v Australia

Career statistics
Competition	Test	First-class
Matches	1	429
Runs scored	7	4,991
Batting average	3.50	10.61
100s/50s	0/0	1/5
Top score	7	119
Balls bowled	265	89,777
Wickets	1	1,916
Bowling average	91.00	18.99
5 wickets in innings	0	152
10 wickets in match	0	39
Best bowling	1/91	9/40
Catches/stumpings	1/–	194/–
- Source: CricInfo, 20 August 2021

Walter Mead (1 April 1868 – 18 March 1954) was the principal bowler for Essex during their first two decades as a first-class county. As a member of the Lord's ground staff, he was also after J.T. Hearne the most important bowler for MCC and Ground, who in those days played quite a number of first-class matches.

A right arm bowler of slow to medium pace with a curious run in which he would change step from short to long, Walter Mead always maintained an excellent length and could spin back to deadly effect whenever wickets were affected by rain. He could vary his stock off break with a ball that turned the other way; however, his variation was easy to detect and he lacked the deceptive flight that enabled such bowlers as Blythe, Dennett or J.C. White to do well on firm pitches. He rarely did much as a batsman, but when sent in as night-watchman against Leicestershire in 1902 he surprised the crowd so much by making 119 that there was a special collection for him as a reward.

Even before Essex had been elevated to first-class status, Walter Mead already had a reputation as a bowler of class. Against the touring Australian in 1893 he took seventeen wickets, but the following season when Essex became first-class he was disappointing on pitches that should have helped him, taking only 41 wickets in eight inter-county matches for 21 each. In 1895, however, after a slow start, he became deadly when wickets became sticky during the middle of July. For the whole summer Mead obtained a record of 179 wickets for less than fifteen runs apiece, and his 17 for 119 against Hampshire is the second best bowling for a losing side in first-class cricket, behind William Mycroft in 1876 (also against Hampshire). Only Tich Freeman has since taken seventeen wickets twice in matches of comparable importance.

1896 and 1897, with most pitches unfavourable to him due to dry weather, were disappointing, but Mead gradually rebounded in the following years. An excellent performance against the Australians in 1899 saw Mead chosen for his only Test match at Lord's, but he was harmless on the hard pitch. He remained close to the top of the first-class averages for every season from 1899 to 1903 — though in 1901 he was helped by some very bad Lord's wickets when playing for the MCC — and in the last year of this period was chosen as a Cricketer of the Year by Wisden after heading the first-class bowling averages with best match figures of twelve for 76 against Surrey at the Oval and fifteen for 115 against Leicestershire at Leyton.

However, over the 1903/1904 winter Walter Mead's career with Essex terminated temporarily as a result of a dispute over winter pay. In order to compensate for the death of his wife and infant daughter, Mead asked for his pay of 15 shillings to be increased to £2. Essex missed him badly in 1904 and 1905. During the spring of 1906 it was briefly thought he would move to Adelaide in a coaching role, but he refused the ultimate offer of the Australian Cricket Association.

After this failure, Mead finally settled his difficulties with the Essex committee in the early weeks of the 1906 season, and resumed his place in mid-May when the season was two weeks old. Considering the remarkable dryness of the 1906 summer in the Home Counties, Mead bowled very well, and in 1907 he was almost as difficult as ever on the soft pitches. However, 1908 saw Mead lose much of his old spin and decline so badly, taking only 48 County Championship wickets, that it was clear his best days were over. Despite a minor revival in 1910 and 1911, when Mead failed to make the most of continuous soft wickets in 1912 it was clear his career was over, so that he dropped out of the eleven before 1913 ended despite Essex having no spin bowler to replace him.

Mead left the Lord's ground staff in 1918, and from 1920 to 1927 worked as a ground supervisor for the sports department of Greene King. His son, Harold, also played some first-class cricket for Essex, although he died in 1921 after never fully recovering from wounds he sustained during World War I. Mead died at the age of eighty-five in 1954.
