= John Bennett (cricketer, born 1864) =

English cricketer

Personal information
- Full name: John William Bennett
- Born: 22 February 1864; Glossop, England
- Died: 10 November 1928 (aged 64); Stepping Hill, Stockport, England
- Batting: Right-handed
- Bowling: Slow left-arm orthodox

Domestic team information
- Years: Team
- Derbyshire
- FC debut: 3 June 1895 Derbyshire v Hampshire
- Last FC: 29 June 1896 Derbyshire v Leicestershire

Career statistics
Competition	First-class
Matches	16
Runs scored	257
Batting average	11.17
100s/50s	0/0
Top score	43
Balls bowled	1,842
Wickets	35
Bowling average	20.02
5 wickets in innings	3
10 wickets in match	0
Best bowling	5/8
Catches/stumpings	7/–
- Source: CricketArchive, March 2012

John William Bennett (22 February 1864 – 10 November 1928) was an English cricketer who played for Derbyshire in 1895 and 1896.

Bennett was born in Lower Whitfield, Glossop, the son of Hiram Bennett a cotton spinner, and he also worked in the cotton industry. He made his cricketing debut in a match for Cheshire against Leicestershire during the 1893 season, scoring 38 runs in the Cheshire innings from tenth in the batting lineup, and only outscored by teammate Alexander Mere Latham. Bennett played two further matches for Cheshire during the 1894 season before being picked up at the beginning of the 1895 season by Derbyshire.

Bennett made his first-class debut for Derbyshire against Hampshire in June 1895, when he top-scored in the first innings before being placed further down the order. He was a regular starter during the 1895 season, in which Derbyshire finished fifth in the County Championship table. Bennett took three 5-wicket innings in the season, with 5 for 101 against Yorkshire, 5 for 40 against Nottinghamshire and his best performance was 5 for 8 against Essex. His top batting score was 43, achieved against Lancashire from ninth in the batting order.

Bennett appeared less frequently during the 1896 season, playing just four times and with a much reduced bowling form. His final match was in an innings victory against Leicestershire.

Bennett was a slow left-arm bowler and took 35 first-class wickets at an average of 20.02 and a best performance of 5 for 38. He was a right-handed batsman and played 25 innings in sixteen first-class matches with an average of 11.17 and a top score of 43.

Bennett died at Stepping Hill, Stockport aged 64.
