= Bill Hitch =

English cricketer (1886–1965)

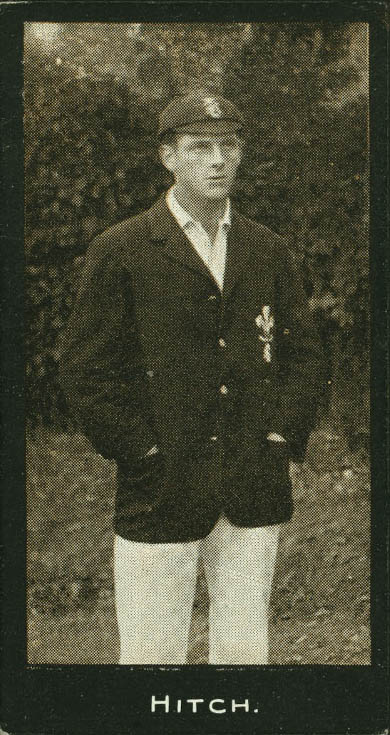
- Hitch in 1912

Personal information
- Full name: John William Hitch
- Born: 7 May 1886; Radcliffe, Lancashire
- Died: 7 July 1965 (aged 79); Rumney, Cardiff
- Batting: right-handed
- Bowling: right-arm fast
- Role: fast bowler

International information
- National side: England
- Test debut: 30 December 1911 v Australia
- Last Test: 13 August 1921 v Australia

Domestic team information
- Years: Team
- 1907–1925: Surrey

Career statistics
Competition	Test	FC
Matches	7	350
Runs scored	103	7,643
Batting average	14.71	17.81
100s/50s	0/1	3/32
Top score	51*	107
Balls bowled	462	56,917
Wickets	7	1,387
Bowling average	46.42	21.56
5 wickets in innings	0	101
10 wickets in match	0	24
Best bowling	2/31	8/38
Catches/stumpings	4/–	230/–
- Source: , 12 June 2026

John William Hitch (7 May 1886 – 7 July 1965) was an English cricketer who played for Surrey and England.

== Career ==
A Lancastrian, Hitch was bowling for a club in Cambridgeshire when he was spotted by Surrey's batsman Tom Hayward and recommended to The Oval. From his debut in 1907, he quickly established himself as one of the fastest bowlers in first-class cricket, and his rumbustious lower-order batting and general enthusiasm made him a favourite with the crowds. In 1908 he took 58 wickets including 13 in a remarkably heavy win against Kent at the Oval, but it was not until the latter part of 1910 that Hitch entered the public eye. His aggressive hitting brought him such innings as 74 against Middlesex on a difficult wicket, whilst at Northampton he made 54 and took 9 for 101 – bowling unchanged with Razor Smith throughout both innings apart from one over. However, it was Hitch's brilliant close catching that garnered the critics' attention and helped Smith to a bag of wickets unrivalled for Surrey except by Tom Richardson in his great days between 1893 and 1897.

In the abnormally dry summer of 1911, Hitch was the third-highest wicket-taker in England (with 151) but it was generally felt he should have done better and was not as accurate as a top-class bowler should be. Nonetheless, Hitch toured Australia in 1911–12 and played for England both then and during the 1912 Triangular Tournament. He also played Tests against Warwick Armstrong's all-conquering Australian cricket team both home and away in 1920–21 and 1921. But in seven matches Hitch took only 11 wickets, and his most notable achievement was an innings of 51 in just 40 minutes at The Oval in 1921.

1912 – a summer in which fast bowlers generally had an impossible task just to get a foothold – saw Hitch against Essex at Leyton produce some of the fastest and most difficult bowling in the history of the game – probably at a speed of around 95 miles per hour (153 km/h). In 1913, Hitch improved his accuracy enough to take 174 wickets, including seven hauls of ten in a match, and be a Wisden Cricketer of the Year for 1914. He maintain this form in 1914 and 1919 but fell off as a bowler afterwards as he lost some of his terrific speed, but compensated in 1921 by scoring over a thousand runs at an average over thirty. His batting feats included 74 in 35 minutes against Nottinghamshire and his highest score of 107 against Somerset at Bath in 1922 was made in just 70 minutes.

=== Fielding ===
In 1921, The Cricketer described Hitch as 'a most brilliant field anywhere, and especially at short leg'.

== Post-retirement ==
After retiring in 1925, Hitch played Lancashire League cricket for four years before becoming coach at Glamorgan. He also served as a first-class umpire during this period.

Bill Hitch died in a local hospital, in the Rumney district of Cardiff, on 7 July 1965, aged 79.

== Images ==
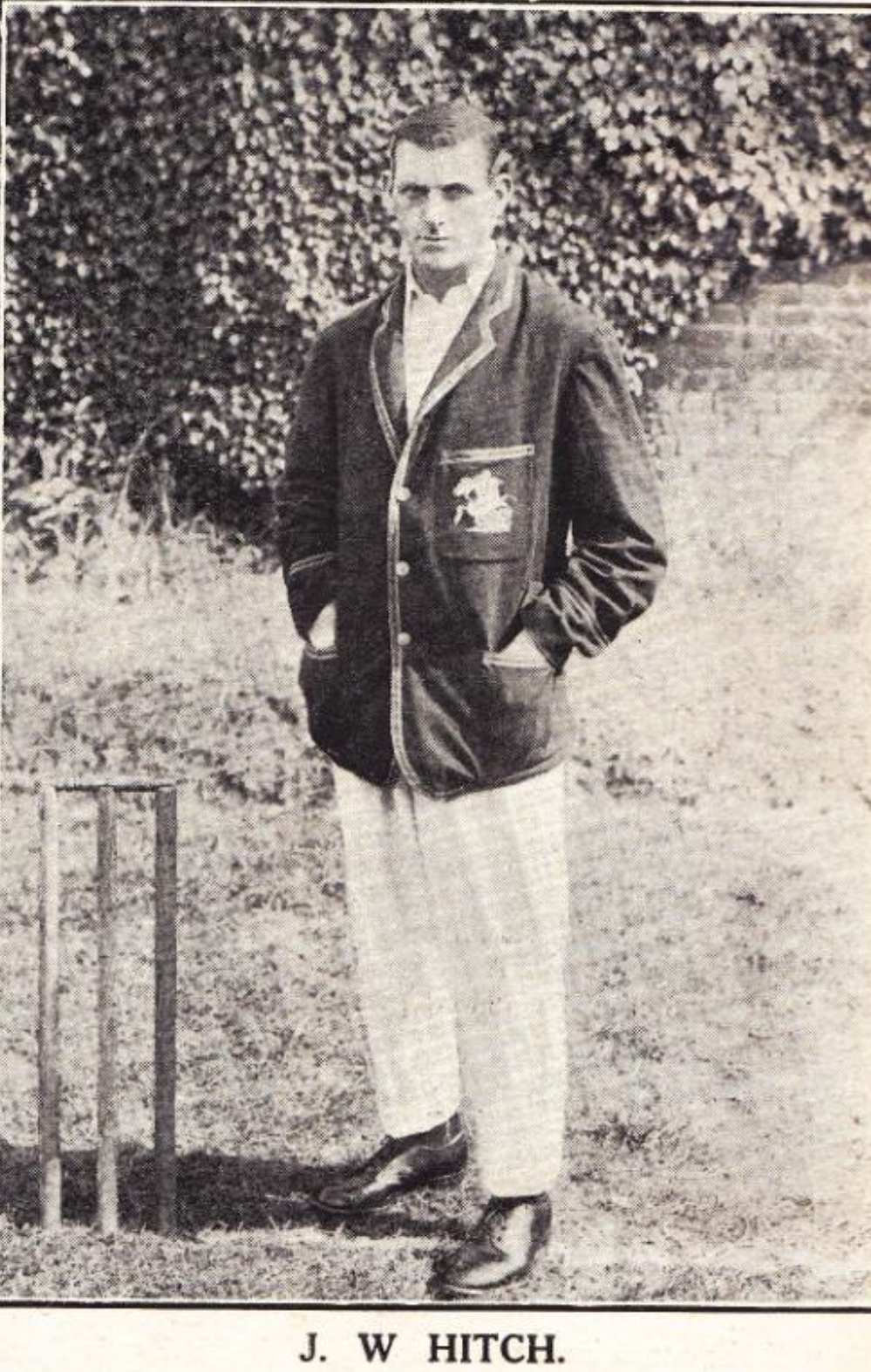
Hitch in 1921

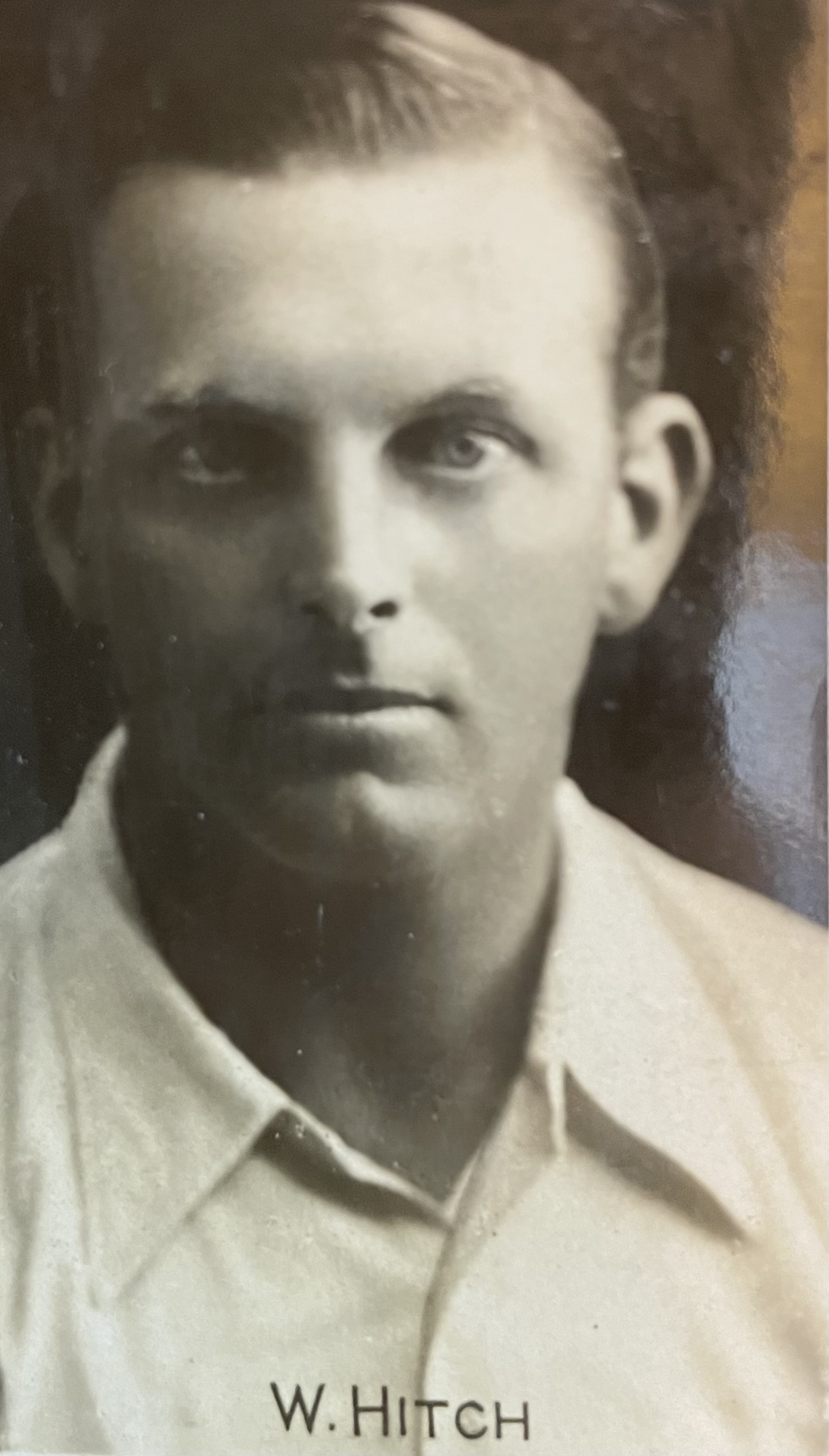
Bill Hitch
