= Derbyshire County Cricket Club in 1877 =

1877 season of an English cricket team

Derbyshire County Cricket Club seasons
1877 season
- Captain: Robert Smith
- Most runs: John Platts
- Most wickets: William Mycroft

Derbyshire Country Cricket Club in 1877 was the cricket season when the English club Derbyshire played their seventh season.

Yorkshire joined Hampshire, Lancashire and Kent as the fourth county to play Derbyshire. John Platts became the first cricketer to score a century for Derbyshire.

== 1877 season ==
All Derbyshire's matches were first class in the 1877 season. They played eight county games, two each against Yorkshire, Lancashire, Kent and Hampshire, and one match against MCC. They won five matches, beating Kent and Hampshire in both matches and Lancashire in one. They lost three matches – one each to Yorkshire, Lancashire and MCC – and drew their other match against Yorkshire

The captain for the year was Robert Smith. Of the players who made their debuts, Leonard Jackson a publican, and Arthur Forman, a Repton schoolmaster both continued playing regularly for five years while Thomas Mycroft appeared occasionally as wicket keeper over the next ten years. Charles Regan a brewer's traveller played his five career first class matches during the season.

Rev William Humble who had played occasionally since 1873 put in his last appearance for the club. Amos Hind who failed to live up to the promise of his initial 1876 season, also left the side.

In their opening match against Lancashire, Derbyshire opened with 111 to which Lancashire replied with 84. Although Derbyshire only managed 51 in their second innings, Lancashire fared worse with 44 to give Derbyshire a 34 run victory. Against Hampshire, Derbyshire made 115 in the first innings and Hampshire scored 105 in response. Derbyshire's second innings reached 242, although no player scored 50 or more. Hampshire were only able to make 63 in reply giving Derbyshire a 189 run victory. Against MCC, Derbyshire were playing a side which included W G Grace who made 83 runs and took 14 wickets. In the first innings MCC made 112, being checked by Mycroft who took 8 wickets while Derbyshire replied with 117. In the second innings MCC made 123 while Derbyshire made 78 to lose by 40 runs. In their second match against Lancashire, Lancashire set an opening target of 215 and Derbyshire made 110 in reply and 114 in the follow-on. Lancashire made the necessary 10 runs to win by 10 wickets. Against Kent, Kent made 191 in the first innings due to 80 by Lord Harris and Derbyshire replied with 127. In Kent's second innings Harris was out for a duck and Kent made 124, while Derbyshire's reply of 189 thanks to 54 not out by Foster gave them the match by one wicket. George Gibbons Hearne took 14 wickets for Kent in the match. In Derbyshire's first County match against Yorkshire, Yorkshire scored 210 and Derbyshire who made 108 were forced to follow on. Derbyshire's second innings total of 189 left Yorkshire with 88 to make which they achieved with the loss of one wicket. In the second Kent match, Kent made 149 in the first innings and Derbyshire replied with 110. Kent's second innings score was 78 and Derbyshire reached 119 to win with three wickets to spare. In the second Hampshire match Hampshire opened with 120 and Derbyshire ran up 319 in reply. Although both R Smith and Rigley were injured in the innings this was compensated for by a score of 115 by Platt. Hampshire scored 86 in their second innings to give Derbyshire a victory by an innings and 113 runs. In the final match against Yorkshire, Yorkshire began with 278 and with a first innings reply of 74, Derbyshire had to follow-on needing over 200. However Derbyshire made 220 with 90 not out by Platt to save the match as a draw, and as there was insufficient time for Yorkshire to bat.

John Platts was top scorer and W Mycroft took most wickets with 63. Platts was also the first Derbyshire cricketer to score a century for the club.

=== Matches ===
List of matches
No.	Date	V	Result	Margin	Notes
1	21 May 1877	Lancashire; County Ground, Derby	Won	34 runs	W McIntyre 8–31 and 7–16; W Hickton 5–37; J T B D Platts 5–18
2	24 May 1877	Hampshire; Day's (Antelope) Ground, Southampton	Won	189 runs	A Ridley 7–46; W Mycroft 6–31 and 6–16; F Tate 6–76
3	28 May 1877	MCC; Lord's Cricket Ground, St John's Wood	Lost	40 runs	W Mycroft 8–47 and 5–57; W G Grace 6–55 and 8–54
4	31 May 1877	Lancashire; At Old Trafford, Manchester	Lost	10 wickets	W McIntyre 5–39 and 7–52; A Watson 5–66
5	18 Jun 1877	Kent; County Ground, Derby	Won	1 wicket	W Mycroft 7–82 and 5–48; GG Hearne 6–52 and 8–78
6	09 Jul 1877	Yorkshire; Bramall Lane, Sheffield	Lost	9 wickets	W Mycroft 5–73; T Emmett 5–25
7	16 Jul 1877	Kent; Higher Common Ground, Tunbridge Wells	Won	3 wickets	W Hickton 6–47; W Mycroft 6–31
8	23 Jul 1877	Hampshire; County Ground, Derby	Won	Innings and 113 runs	J T B D Platts 115;A Ridley 5–121; W Hickton 5–44
9	20 Aug 1877	Yorkshire; County Ground, Derby	Drawn		RO Clayton 7–35

== Statistics ==
=== Cricketers who played and their first-class batting performances ===
Name	Am/ Pro	Age	Hand	Matches	Inns	Runs	High score	Average	100s
J T B D Platts	P	28	L	9	17	432	115	25.41	1
R P Smith	A	28	R	9	17	340	52*	21.25	0
W Hickton	P	34	R	7	13	180	63	16.36	0
W Rigley	P	25	R	9	17	253	57	14.88	0
G Frost	A	28	R	8	15	218	46	14.53	0
A Hind		27	R	9	17	213	43	12.52	0
T Foster	P	28	R	9	17	179	54*	11.93	0
J Smith	A	35	R	7	14	140	31	10.76	0
AFE Forman	A	26	R	2	3	32	21	10.66	0
L Jackson	P	29	R	3	6	48	17*	9.60	0
C Regan	A	35	R	5	10	90	22	9.00	0
WJ Humble	A	30	R	2	3	27	17	9.00	0
A Shuker	A	28	R	2	4	28	12	7.00	0
A Smith		30	R	7	13	39	10*	4.33	0
W Mycroft	P	36	R	8	14	54	16	4.09	0
T Mycroft	P	29	L	2	3	12	8	4.00	0
H Shaw	A	23	R	1	2	4	3	4.00	0

Platts also played 2 innings and scored 46 runs for Players of the North. W Mycroft played 23 innings in 14 other first class matches for a variety of sides scoring 92 runs.

=== First-class bowling averages ===
Name	Hand	Balls	Runs	Wickets	BB	Average
W Mycroft	L F	2149	695	63	8–47	11.03
W Hickton	R F	1358	522	40	6–47	13.05
A Hind	R round M	696	280	16	4–9	17.50
J T B D Platts	R F	863	351	13	5–18	27.00
L Jackson	R round-arm F	267	100	5	2–19	20.00
R P Smith	R underarm S	24	11	0		
J Smith	R round-arm	20	16	0		
AFE Forman	R round-arm F	12	3	0		

Mycroft took an additional 94 first class wickets for other teams

=== Wicket Keeping ===
- Alfort Smith Catches 5, Stumping 0
- Thomas Mycroft Catches 1, Stumping 1

== See also ==
- Derbyshire County Cricket Club seasons
- 1877 English cricket season
