= Derbyshire County Cricket Club in 1878 =

1878 season of an English cricket team

Derbyshire County Cricket Club seasons
1878 season
- Captain: Robert Smith
- Most runs: Robert Smith
- Most wickets: W Mycroft
- Most catches: Alfort Smith

Derbyshire County Cricket Club in 1878 was the cricket season when the English club Derbyshire played their eighth season.

Nottinghamshire played Derbyshire again after a two-year break, joining Yorkshire Hampshire, Lancashire and Kent as the fifth county to play Derbyshire

== 1878 season ==
In 1878, Derbyshire played two county matches each against Nottinghamshire, Yorkshire, Lancashire, and Kent, along with one match each against the MCC and the All England. They won three first-class matches in total and lost eight. Additionally, they played a miscellaneous match against Uppingham.

The captain for the year was Robert Smith. Among the debutants, John Richardson, a bricklayer, played intermittently over the next five years, while Enoch Cook, a lace maker, appeared in eight matches over two seasons. Henry Evans, a railway clerk, appeared occasionally over the next five years. John Cartledge and Thomas Limb, a miner, played their only single career first class matches during the season. Conrad Wallroth an Oxford graduate of independent means, and William Wood-Sims, a slater, appeared for the Uppingham match, although they did not make their first-class debuts until the following season. Three players who took part in Derbyshire's first match played their last season for Derbyshire. These were Samuel Richardson, the club's first captain, William Hickton and John Smith. W G Curgenven, who was one of the founders of the club, and played his first game in 1872, also played his last match.

In the opening County match against Yorkshire, Derbyshire scored 109 and Yorkshire replied with 122. Derbyshire scored 34 in the second innings with no player reaching double figures. Yorkshire lost five wickets for 22, but that was enough to give them a five wicket victory.

Against MCC Derbyshire made 36 in the first innings, losing eight wickets by WG Grace. MCC made 74 in reply. Derbyshire made 118 in their second innings with 50 from Platts and MCC made the necessary 81 runs in reply with the loss of five wickets.

Against Hampshire, Derbyshire made 137, and Hampshire had made 40 at the end of the first day. Hampshire had reached 74 for seven by the end of the second day, and with no play on the final day, the game ended in a draw. In the match against Lancashire, Lancashire opened with 85, Derbyshire replied with 61 and Lancashire had reached 21 in their second innings at the end of day one. Lancashire made 125 in their second innings, and Derbyshire were all out for 76 before the second day was out, leaving a Lancashire victory of 73 runs. In the first match against Kent, Kent made 111 and Derbyshire made 95 in reply. Kent's second innings was dominated by a century from Lord Harris making a total of 228 and Derbyshire managed 162 in reply to give Kent victory by 82 runs. Against Nottinghamshire, Nottinghamshire made 94, Derbyshire made 55, and Nottinghamshire were on 41 in the second innings by the end of the first day. Nottinghamshire reached 176, and Derbyshire were all out for 93 before the end of the second day to give Nottinghamshire a 122 run victory.

In the second match against Lancashire, Lancashire made 112 and Derbyshire were on 165 at the end of the first day. Derbyshire reached 250 in their first innings, and Lancashire were all out for 105 on the second day to give Derbyshire a victory by an innings and 33 runs. In the match against the All England Eleven, All England made a first innings total of 190 and Derbyshire reached 90 in reply at the end of the first day. Derbyshire were then all out for 110 and followed on to make 113. All England had made 35 for three before the second day was out and won by seven wickets. The next match was a fixture against Uppingham (probably the school) when Uppingham played with 18 men. Derbyshire replied with 66 to Uppingham's opening 113. Uppingham made 112 in the second innings and Derbyshire replying with 110 were down by 49 runs.

In the second match against Kent, Kent opened with 155, Derbyshire replied with 79 and Kent were on 70 for the loss of no wickets by the end of the first day. Kent reached 175 and Derbyshire were all out for 126 before the day was out, to give Kent a 125 run victory. In the second match against Hampshire, Hampshire made 62 and Derbyshire had reached 229 by the end of the first day. Derbyshire finished the first innings on 238 and had Kent all out for 113 on the second day to take a victory by an innings and 63 runs. In the second match against Yorkshire, Derbyshire opened with 106 and left Yorkshire on 78 for 7 by the end of the first day. There was no play on the second day, but on the third day, Derbyshire finished Yorkshire for 84, made 57 in their second innings and had Yorkshire all out for 72 to win by 7 runs. In the last match of the season against Nottinghamshire, Derbyshire made 108 in their first innings and Nottinghamshire replied with 166. Derbyshire made 120 in their second innings and Nottinghamshire made the necessary 65 for the loss of three wickets to win by seven wickets.

Robert Smith was also top scorer and W Mycroft took over 100 wickets for Derbyshire

=== Matches ===
List of first class matches
No.	Date	V	Result	Margin	Notes
1	27 May 1878	Yorkshire; Bramall Lane, Sheffield	Lost	5 wickets	T Emmett 6-12
2	03 Jun 1878	MCC; Lord's Cricket Ground, St John's Wood	Lost	5 wickets	W G Grace 8-23; W Mycroft 5-27
3	10 Jun 1878	Hampshire; County Ground, Derby	Drawn		CR Young 5-60;
4	13 Jun 1878	Lancashire; Old Trafford, Manchester	Lost	73 runs	J Flint 6-37; E Storer 5–12; W Mycroft 5-38; A Watson 7-33
5	17 Jun 1878	Kent; County Ground, Derby	Lost	82 runs	Lord Harris 106; W Mycroft 6-22; GG Hearne 6-77
6	20 Jun 1878	Nottinghamshire; Trent Bridge, Nottingham	Lost	122 runs	W Mycroft 7-35 and 6-70; F Morley 5-26; A Shaw 7-41
7	24 Jun 1878	Lancashire; County Ground, Derby	Won	Innings and 33 runs	W Mycroft 8-36 and 5-52; A Watson 5-67
8	01 Jul 1878	All England Eleven; County Ground, Derby	Lost	7 wickets	A Shaw 5-41
9	22 Jul 1878	Kent; Mote Park, Maidstone	Lost	125 runs	W Mycroft 8-66; GG Hearne 5-25 and 6-40; A Penn 5-46; G Hay 6-35
10	25 Jul 1878	Hampshire; Day's (Antelope) Ground, Southampton	Won	Innings and 63 runs	W Mycroft 6-25
11	05 Aug 1878	Yorkshire; County Ground, Derby	Won	7 runs	W Mycroft 5-29 and 6-16
12	19 Aug 1878	Nottinghamshire; County Ground, Derby	Lost	7 wickets	A Shaw 5-43; F Morley 6-41

List of other matches
No.	Date	V	Result	Margin	Notes
1	15 Jul 1878	Uppingham	Lost	49 runs	Uppingham had 16 players

== Statistics ==
=== Cricketers who played and their first-class batting performances ===
Name	Am/ Pro	Age	Hand	Matches	Inns	Runs	High score	Average	100s
R P Smith	A	29	R	12	21	390	69	18.57	0
T Foster	P	29	R	12	21	348	44	16.57	0
AFE Forman	A	27	R	1	1	16	16	16.00	0
E Cook		33	R	4	7	74	23*	14.80	0
W Rigley	P	26	R	12	21	305	69	14.52	0
W G Curgenven	A	36	R	6	10	143	39	14.30	0
W Hickton	P	35	R	11	19	237	31*	13.16	0
J T B D Platts	P	29	L	12	21	252	50	12.00	0
A Shuker	A	29	R	3	5	57	23	11.40	0
J Smith	A	36	R	2	4	25	21	6.25	0
AS Barnes	A	27	R	6	10	53	16	5.88	0
W Mycroft	P	37	R	12	21	105	44*	5.00	0
G Frost	A	29	R	8	14	70	13	5.00	0
H Shaw	A	24	R	3	6	18	17*	4.50	0
G Hay	A	27	R	12	21	85	23*	4.47	0
A Smith		31	R	11	19	28	7	2.15	0
J Flint		28	R	2	3	6	4	2.00	0
H Evans	A	20	R	1	2	2	2	1.00	0
S Richardson	A	33	R	1	2	2	2	1.00	0
J Cartledge	A	23		1	2	1	1	0.50	0
T Mycroft	P	30	L	2	4	0	0	0.00	0
T Limb		28	R	1	2	0	0	0.00	0
J Richardson		22	R	1	2	0	0*	0.00	0
CA Wallroth	A	27	R						
WW Wood-Sims		20	R						

Smith played 1 match for North v South (36) Rigley played twice for Players v Australians (28) (27) W Mycroft played 10 innings in 6 other first class matches for several sides scoring 19 runs.

=== First-class bowling averages ===
Name	Hand	Balls	Runs	Wickets	BB	Average
W Mycroft	L F	3208	955	101	8-36	9.45
G Hay	R round-arm F	1861	730	46	6-35	15.86
J T B D Platts	R F	724	295	19	3-8	15.52
W Hickton	R F	741	279	11	2-12	25.36
J Flint	R round-arm S	208	88	8	6-37	11.00
J Richardson	R F	46	17	3	2-15	5.66
R P Smith	R underarm S	20	12	0		
T Foster	R round-arm F	20	5	0		
A Smith		16	7	0		

Mycroft took an additional 15 first class wickets for other teams

=== Wicket Keeping ===
- Alfort Smith Catches 12, Stumping 2
- Thomas Mycroft Catches 4, Stumping 1

== See also ==
- Derbyshire County Cricket Club seasons
- 1878 English cricket season
