= John Smith (Derbyshire cricketer) =

English cricketer

Personal information
- Full name: John Smith
- Born: 27 October 1841; Clifton, Derby, England
- Died: 26 November 1898 (aged 57); Derby, England
- Batting: Right-handed
- Bowling: Right-arm

Domestic team information
- Years: Team
- 1871–1878: Derbyshire
- FC debut: 26 May 1871 Derbyshire v Lancashire
- Last FC: 1 July 1876 Derbyshire v All England Eleven

Career statistics
Competition	First-class
Matches	22
Runs scored	403
Batting average	11.19
100s/50s	0/0
Top score	35
Balls bowled	396
Wickets	6
Bowling average	27.00
5 wickets in innings	0
10 wickets in match	0
Best bowling	3/38
Catches/stumpings	14/–
- Source: CricketArchive, 16 December 2010

John Smith (27 October 1841 — 26 November 1898) was an English cricketer who played for Derbyshire from 1871 to 1878. He was a member of the team that played Derbyshire's first match in May 1871.

Smith was born in Clifton, Derby and was a solicitor by profession. From 1865 he was playing cricket regularly for Gentlemen of Derbyshire and South Derbyshire. Smith debuted for Derbyshire in the 1871 season in their first match against Lancashire. He was one of five round-arm bowlers of Derbyshire's debut season (the others being James Billyeald, Dove Gregory, William Hickton, John Platts, and John Tilson). Smith played one first-class match in the 1872 season and also played against the Prince's Club. He played no first-class matches in the 1873 season but took part in a miscellaneous game against Nottinghamshire. He made his first real breakthrough playing three of four matches in Derbyshire's undefeated 1874 season. As a lower-order batsman, he was not out for 15 against Sandy Watson, who took nine-wickets for Lancashire in a game which Derbyshire still won. Smith played in five of Derbyshire's seven matches in the 1875 season. He played three matches in the 1876 season and seven in the 1877 season. In his last season for Derbyshire in 1878, he played two first-class matches, his last against an All England XI. He also played two matches for Derbyshire against school teams. In 1879 he played for Gentlemen of Derbyshire against a team of Canadian expatriates, including Walter Wright and Thomas Phillips.

Smith was a right-handed batsman and played 38 innings in 22 first-class matches with an average of 11.19 and a top score of 35. He was a right-arm round-arm bowler and took 6 wickets at an average of 27.00 and a best performance of 3 for 38.

Smith died in Derby at the age of 57.
