= Derbyshire County Cricket Club in 1874 =

1874 season of an English cricket team

Derbyshire County Cricket Club seasons
1874 season
- Captain: Samuel Richardson
- Most runs: George Frost
- Most wickets: William Mycroft

Derbyshire County Cricket Club in 1874 was the cricket season when the English club Derbyshire earned the title of Champion County in their fourth year playing as a club. Kent joined Lancashire to make the second County side to play first class matches against Derbyshire in 1874. Derbyshire won three first-class matches and drew one, making it the only season in which they never lost a match.

== 1874 season ==
Derbyshire were considered Champion County with other teams because at the time the smallest number of games lost decided the order of merit. Through no fault of their own, Derbyshire were able to arrange matches only against Lancashire and Kent, three of which ended in victory and the other in a draw. In fact Derbyshire played four other matches in the season, and lost none of them either. They played two matches against Yorkshire United which were draws. The other matches were against Nottinghamshire and United South of England Eleven, which they won by 14 and 11 wickets respectively. Their convincing wins may be attributable to the fact that they had sixteen players to their opponents' eleven

Samuel Richardson was in his fourth season as captain. Abraham Shuker, a schoolmaster at Trent College, and John Tye, a blacksmith, made their debut for the county and went on to play several more seasons. There were also single match appearances for the 1874 season only from veteran Walter Boden, lace manufacturer, Edward Estridge, a Repton schoolmaster and John Frost, a joiner and John Cooke, both from Wirksworth. Additionally Henry Shaw and George Hay, who made their first class debuts in the following season appeared in Derbyshire's other matches as did CF Richardson.

Those who played their last season for Derbyshire were Thomas Attenborough and Joseph Davidson who played in Derbyshire's first match in 1871, and Richard Allsop, who joined in 1872.

Derbyshire played their home first-class matches at two new venues. Against Kent they played at Derby Road Ground, Wirksworth and against Lancashire they played at Saltergate, Chesterfield. They used the County Ground for their other miscellaneous matches.

Derbyshire opened the season with a return of their match against Nottinghamshire in the previous season, when again they played 16 men to 11. Derbyshire scored 163 in the first innings and Notts were only able to score 65 and had to follow on. Nottinghamshire scored 125 in their second innings and Derbyshire were able to make the 28 run difference to win for the loss of one wicket. The first County match was against Lancashire, when Derbyshire scored 190 in their first innings and had Lancashire out for 38. In the follow on Lancashire made 181 and Derbyshire made the 30 runs needed to win for the loss of one wicket. The third match was a two-day fixture against Yorkshire United when Yorkshire replied with 232 to Derbyshire's first innings total of 105. Derbyshire reached 223 for 7 in their second innings when time ran out and the result was a draw. The next county match was Derbyshire's first against Kent. Derbyshire scored 97 in their first innings and Kent replied with 25. Derbyshire scored 36 in the second innings and Derbyshire got Kent all out for 75 to take the game. In the next match against Kent, Kent scored 88 and Derbyshire replied with 92. Kent managed 198 in their second innings but Derbyshire matched it for seven wickets to take the game. In the last County match against Lancashire, Derbyshire made 161 in the first innings and Lancashire responded with 104. However, there was no play on the last day and the game ended in a draw. The second match against Yorkshire United also ended in a draw with Yorkshire scoring 183, Derbyshire replying with 129 and Yorkshire making 152 in their second innings. The last match of the season was against a United South of England Eleven when again Derbyshire had the advantage of 16 players. The South scored 167 and Derbyshire replied with 202. In their second innings, the South made 86 and Derbyshire reached the necessary 52 for the loss of four wickets.

George Frost scored most runs in first class matches and William Mycroft took most first class wickets.

=== Matches ===
List of first class matches
No.	Date	V	Result	Margin	Notes
1	05 Jun 1874	Lancashire; Old Trafford, Manchester	Won	9 wickets	W Mycroft 6-23; A Watson 9-
2	13 Jul 1874	Kent; Derby Road Ground, Wirksworth	Won	33 runs	E Willsher 6-36 and 7-22; W Mycroft 5-8
3	23 Jul 1874	Kent; Higher Common Ground, Tunbridge Wells	Won	3 wickets	W Hickton 6-15 and 5-68; William Draper 5-51
4	03 Aug 1874	Lancashire; Saltergate Ground, Chesterfield	Drawn		W Hickton 6-63; A Watson 6-43

List of other matches
No.	Date	V	Result	Margin	Notes
1	25 May 1874	Nottinghamshire; Trent Bridge, Nottingham	Won	14 wickets	F Morley 7-60; W Mycroft 6-22; J Flint 5-45
2	02 Jul 1874	Yorkshire United; County Ground, Derby	Drawn		W Mycroft 5-77
3	07 Aug 1874	Yorkshire United; Woodhouse Hill Ground, Hunslet	Drawn		
4	17 Aug 1874	United South of England Eleven; County Ground, Derby	Won	11 wickets	J Flint 6 wkts and 5 wkts; WG Grace 7 wkts

== Statistics ==
=== Cricketers who played and their first-class batting performances ===
Name	Am/ Pro	Age	Hand	Matches	Inns	Runs	High score	Average	100s
T Foster	P	25	R	1	2	34	19*	34.00	0
G Frost	A	25	R	4	7	147	37	24.50	0
A Shuker	A	25	R	2	2	46	41	23.00	0
J Smith	A	32	R	3	4	49	27	16.33	0
S Richardson	A	29	R	2	3	44	24	14.66	0
J Flint		24	R	4	5	53	24	13.25	0
R P Smith	A	25	R	4	7	91	47	13.00	0
R Allsop	A	24	R	2	3	37	33	12.33	0
W Hickton	P	31	R	2	3	37	21	12.33	0
J T B D Platts	P	35	L	3	6	67	26	11.16	0
JH Frost	A	26	R	1	2	19	18	9.50	0
WJ Humble	A	27	R	3	5	37	19*	9.25	0
J Tye	A	25	R	3	4	21	11	5.25	0
E Estridge	A	31	R	1	1	4	4	4.00	0
J Cooke	A	23	R	1	2	6	6	3.00	0
W G Curgenven	A	32	R	1	2	5	5	2.50	0
W Boden	A	36	R	1	2	2	2*	2.00	0
W Mycroft	P	33	R	3	4	2	2	0.50	0
T Attenborough	A	40	R	2	2	0	0	0.00	0
J Davidson	A	27	R	1	1	0	0*	0	0
JW Burnham	A	34	R						
W Rigley	P	22	R						
H Shaw	A	20	R						
CF Richardson	A		R						
G Hay	A	23	R						
U Sowter	A	35	R						

R Smith and W Mycroft also played one first-class match each for United North of England, and J Platts also played a single first class match for Players of the North. Figures for these matches are excluded from the tables.

=== First Class bowling averages ===
Name	Hand	Balls	Runs	Wickets	BB	Average
W Mycroft	L F	596	186	20	6-23	9.30
J Flint	R round S	548	238	18	4-14	13.22
W Hickton	R F	414	144	17	6-15	8.47
J T B D Platts	R F	124	71	5	2-22	14.20
T Attenborough	L S	48	24	2	1-9	12.00
J Tye	R round F	17	4	1	1-1	4.00
T Foster	R round F	28	22	1	1-22	22.00

=== Wicket keeping ===
- S Richardson catches 1, stumping 0
- John Cooke catches 0, stumping 0

== See also ==
- Derbyshire County Cricket Club seasons
- 1874 English cricket season
