= Derbyshire County Cricket Club in 1880 =

1880 season of an English cricket team

Derbyshire County Cricket Club seasons
1880 season
- Captain: Robert Smith
- Most runs: Thomas Foster
- Most wickets: William Mycroft
- Most catches: Alfort Smith

Derbyshire County Cricket Club in 1880 was the tenth season of the English cricket club Derbyshire.

Derbyshire played Lancashire and Yorkshire, whom they had played in the previous season. However, instead of Hampshire and Nottinghamshire, they played against Sussex for the first time and Kent, whom they had played in a previous season.

== 1880 season ==
Derbyshire played eight county games in 1880, two each against Lancashire, Kent, Sussex and Yorkshire. They also played a first-class match against MCC and a match against the touring Australians. Derbyshire won one match against Kent and one against Sussex.

Robert Smith was in his fifth year as captain. Sydney Evershed of the brewing family and Edmund Maynard an Old Harrovian, both future captains, made their debuts for the club in 1880. George Barrington an Old Reptonian, and James Stubbings, a stonemason, went on to play occasionally for several more seasons. Stephen Doughty, a miner, joined to play in 1880 and 1886 and William Antliff, a railway clerk, played two first-class games for Derbyshire in the 1880 season.

Derbyshire's long standing wicket-keeper since 1873, Alfort Smith, played his last season in 1880, but maintained contact with the game by umpiring. George Frost who had played his first season in 1872 also played his last season. Frederick Keeton had joined Derbyshire in 1876 and played his last first-class match, although he did re-appear for the club in 1888 when their matches were not first class. AW Cursham played his second and last season as a cricketer for Derbyshire but continued his football career until he emigrated to the United States three years later.

Derbyshire opened the season with a match against the touring Australians. The Australians opened with 129 and Derbyshire managed 45 in reply and followed on to make 125. The Australians made 42, to win by eight wickets before the end of the second day. Derbyshire lost 13 wickets for 85 runs to Fred Spofforth who ten years later was Derbyshire's captain. With a day spare, the teams played a fill up one-innings match in which Derbyshire made 119, but Australia did not have a chance to bat. In the Lancashire match, Lancashire made 204 in their first innings and Derbyshire made 246 in reply. Lancashire replicated their score with 204 in the second innings. Derbyshire lost two players run out chasing Lancashire's total and ended 21 runs behind on 141. Against MCC, Derbyshire managed a first innings total of 26 in reply to MCC's 201 and made 74 in to follow-on to give MCC a victory of an innings and 191 runs. Fred Morley took 11 Derbyshire wickets at a cost of 43 runs. In the match against Kent, Kent made 102 in the first innings and Derbyshire responded with 99. Kent made 96 in their second innings and Derbyshire reached the necessary 96 for the loss of 4 wickets to achieve a six wicket victory. Against Sussex, Derbyshire opened with 130 and Sussex made 140 in reply. Derbyshire's second innings total was 244 but there was only time for Sussex to make 43 for the loss of one wicket, and the match ended in a draw. In the match against Yorkshire, Yorkshire made 109, and Platts' five wickets included a hat-trick. Derbyshire were all out for 26 in reply and followed on to make 103. Yorkshire went in to bat again to make the 23 runs needed to give them a seven wicket victory by the end of the second day. In the second match against Lancashire, after Lancashire made 89, Derbyshire completed their innings with 75 by the end of the first day. Lancashire's second innings total was 123 and Derbyshire were all out for 72 by the end of the second day to give Lancashire a win by 65 runs. In the second match against Yorkshire, Yorkshire opened with 226 and Derbyshire had made 72 for three by the end of the first day. Derbyshire made a further 55 in their first innings and were all out for 62 in the follow-on on the second day so that Yorkshire won by an innings and 27 runs. In the second match against Sussex, Derbyshire had Sussex all out for 45 and then made 226 in reply. By the close of play on the first day Sussex had made 25 of their second innings total of 211. Derbyshire were left to make 33 which they managed on the second day for the loss of one wicket, winning by 9 wickets. In the final match of the season against Kent, Derbyshire opened with 55 to which Kent replied with 122. Derbyshire made 103 in their second innings and before the second day was out Kent had made 37 without loss to win by 10 wickets.

Several Derbyshire players also played other first class matches for Gentlement and Players and for the North during the season. Thomas Foster was top scorer for Derbyshire although William Rigley scored most first class runs. William Mycroft took 58 wickets for Derbyshire and 80 wickets in all his first class games.

=== Matches ===
List of first class matches
No.	Date	V	Result	Margin	Notes
1	17 May 1880	Australians; County Ground, Derby	Lost	8 wickets	G Hay 5-49; F Spofforth 5-24 and 8-61; G Palmer 5-16
2	20 May 1880	Lancashire; Old Trafford, Manchester	Lost	21 runs	J Stubbings 5-51
3	07 Jun 1880	MCC; Lord's Cricket Ground, St John's Wood	Lost	Innings and 101 runs	F Morley 6-9 and 5-34
4	14 Jun 1880	Kent; County Ground, Derby	Won	6 wickets	G Hay 6-23; C Cunliffe 7-25; W Mycroft 6-43
5	21 Jun 1880	Sussex; County Ground, Derby	Drawn		J Lillywhite 5-39; W Mycroft 5-53
6	02 Aug 1880	Yorkshire; County Ground, Derby	Lost	7 wickets	W Mycroft 5-47; J T B D Platts 5-26; W Bates 5-15; E Peate 5-11 and 6-52
7	09 Aug 1880	Lancashire; County Ground, Derby	Lost	65 runs	W Mycroft 6-28; A Watson 7-27; George Nash 6-41
8	19 Aug 1880	Yorkshire; Fartown, Huddersfield	Lost	Innings and 37 runs	W Mycroft 6-99; E Peate 5-50 and 5-31; A Hill 5-24
9	23 Aug 1880	Sussex; County Ground, Hove	Won	9 wickets	G Hay 6-16; H Shaw 5-34
10	26 Aug 1880	Kent; Mote Park, Maidstone	Lost	10 wickets	CM Cunliffe 6-25 and 5-44; W Mycroft 5-32

List of other matches
No.	Date	V	Result	Margin	Notes
1	18 May 1880	Australians; County Ground, Derby	Drawn		Fill-up match A Bannerman 7-50

== Statistics ==
=== Cricketers who played and their first-class batting performances ===
Name	Am/ Pro	Age	Hand	Matches	Inns	Runs	High score	Average	100s
A Shuker	A	31	R	4	8	157	55	22.42	0
T Foster	P	31	R	10	19	322	78	16.94	0
W Rigley	P	28	R	10	19	288	65	15.15	0
R P Smith	A	31	R	10	19	270	55	14.21	0
G Hay	A	29	R	10	18	190	49	10.56	0
GB Barrington	A	23	R	10	19	198	26	10.42	0
J T B D Platts	P	31	L	10	20	196	39	9.80	0
AW Cursham	A	27	R	5	8	72	40	9.00	0
G Frost	A	31	R	5	10	72	17*	9.00	0
S Doughty		24	R	3	5	32	13*	8.00	0
EAJ Maynard	A	19	R	1	2	15	15	7.50	0
F W Keeton	A	23	R	1	2	15	9	7.50	0
SH Evershed	A	19	R	2	4	20	10	5.00	0
W Mycroft	P	39	R	10	18	62	13*	3.88	0
H Shaw	A	26	R	3	5	22	8	4.40	0
WN Antliff		31	R	2	4	17	5	4.25	0
A Smith		33	R	10	18	54	11	4.15	0
J Stubbings	P	24	R	3	6	12	10*	4.00	0
WW Wood-Sims		22	R	1	2	3	3	1.50	0

In addition, in the Gentlemen v Players match, RP Smith, Barrington and Evershed played for Gentlemen against Rigley, Foster, Hay and Mycroft for Players and Mycroft also played for Players against Australians. Rigley, Foster, Platts, Hay, Mycroft and A Smith played for the North in a North v South match

=== First-class bowling averages ===
Name	Hand	Balls	Runs	Wickets	BB	Average
W Mycroft	L F	2345	772	58	6-28	13.31
G Hay	R round-arm F	1350	570	38	6-16	15.00
J T B D Platts	R F	1288	448	31	5-26	14.45
H Shaw	R round-arm M	116	47	6	5-34	7.83
J Stubbings	R F	185	113	6	5-51	18.83
T Foster	R round-arm F	36	24	1	1-16	24.00
S Doughty	R OS	124	48	1	1-38	48.00

=== Wicket keeping ===
- A Smith Catches 14, Stumping 1

== See also ==
- Derbyshire County Cricket Club seasons
- 1880 English cricket season
