= Joseph Davidson (cricketer) =

English cricketer

Personal information
- Full name: Joseph Davidson
- Born: 9 August 1846; Brimington, Derbyshire, England
- Died: 3 December 1901 (aged 55); Brimington, England
- Batting: Right-handed
- Bowling: Right-arm off-break
- Relatives: Frank Davidson (son); George Davidson (son)

Domestic team information
- Years: Team
- 1871–1874: Derbyshire
- First-class debut: 26 May 1871 Derbyshire v Lancashire
- Last First-class: 3 August 1874 Derbyshire v Lancashire

Career statistics
Competition	First-class
Matches	4
Runs scored	14
Batting average	4.66
100s/50s	0/0
Top score	8
Balls bowled	228
Wickets	6
Bowling average	16.00
5 wickets in innings	0
10 wickets in match	0
Best bowling	3/33
Catches/stumpings	2/–
- Source: CricketArchive, 16 December 2010

Joseph Davidson (9 August 1846 – 3 December 1901) was an English cricketer who played for Derbyshire between 1871 and 1874. He was a member of the team that played Derbyshire's first match in May 1871.

Davidson was born in Brimington, Derbyshire and became a coal miner. He played as a lower-order batsman in Derbyshire's first ever match as a county side in the 1871 season, which was an innings defeat of Lancashire. He played no part in the 1872 season, but played two matches for Derbyshire against Lancashire in the 1873 season and one match against Lancashire in the 1874 season.

Davidson was a right-arm off-break bowler and took six first-class wickets, being overshadowed by Derbyshire's trio of Mycroft, Platts and Hickton. He was a right-handed batsman and played six innings in four first-class matches with an average of 4.66 and a top score of 8.

Davidson's sons Frank and George both played for Derbyshire in the late 19th century. They lived at Brimington Common in 1881 where he died two years after his son George.
