= Derbyshire County Cricket Club in 1875 =

1875 season of an English cricket team

Derbyshire County Cricket Club seasons
1875 season
- Captain: Samuel Richardson
- Most runs: Thomas Foster
- Most wickets: William Mycroft

Derbyshire County Cricket Club in 1875 was the cricket season when the English club Derbyshire played their fifth season. Nottinghamshire had played informal matches against Derbyshire in previous seasons, and joined Lancashire and Kent to make a third County side playing first class matches against Derbyshire in 1875. Nottinghamshire dropped out again in the 1876 season, to be replaced by Hampshire.

== 1875 season ==
All Derbyshire's matches in the season were first class as they played Nottinghamshire with a normal eleven man side in two matches as well as Kent and Lancashire. They also had a match against a United North of England Eleven. After an unbeaten season in 1874 season, Derbyshire won two matches and lost four. They won both matches against Kent, lost both against Nottinghamshire, lost against United North of England and drew one match and lost the other against Lancashire.

Samuel Richardson was in his fifth season as captain. George Hay, a cricket professional, made his first class debut in the season and became a regular player for several years. Henry Shaw who worked as a painter for the Midland Railway, also made his debut. Although he only played one match in 1875, he went on to play further seasons for Derbyshire. Both Hay and Shaw had appeared in a minor game for Derbyshire in 1874. George Bradley, a house painter, and Dick Barlow, better known for his cricket career with Lancashire, each made their single career first class appearances during the season.

In Derbyshire's opening match in May against Nottinghamshire, Nottinghamshire made 135 in the first innings and Derbyshire responded with 125. Nottinghamshire made 205 in their second innings. Hickton, who had bowled 36 overs and taken four wickets in the first inning, only bowled 20 overs in the second and was unable to bat through injury. A Derbyshire side, with one man down, managed 122 before being all out in the second innings 93 runs behind. In the second match, against Lancashire, Lancashire opened with 182 and Derbyshire made 129 in reply. Lancashire were all out for 68 in their second innings, but Derbyshire, with Shuker retired hurt, had only reached 77 before the close of play to leave the match a draw. Against Kent, Derbyshire made 307 to Kent's 131 and Kent were all out in their second innings for 113 saving Derbyshire the need to play again for an innings victory. In the next match, Lancashire opened with 240. Derbyshire made 121 and were called on to follow on. They were all out for 57 and it was their turn to lose by an innings. In the second match against Kent, Derbyshire made 213 and Kent managed 70 and 83 in their two innings to suffer an innings defeat again. In the second match against Nottinghamshire, Derbyshire replied to Nottinghamshire's 179 with 138. Nottinghamshire made 142 in the second innings, but Derbyshire were all out for 66 thanks to Shaw who achieved a hat-trick, and finished 117 runs behind. In the last match, the United North of England opened with 83 and Derbyshire made 56 in reply. The United North made 130 in the second innings and Derbyshire made 67 to lose by 90 runs.

Thomas Foster was top scorer and W Mycroft took most wickets with 73. Mycroft had a five wicket innings in every match and achieved two five wicket innings in four of them

=== Matches ===
List of first class matches
No.	Date	V	Result	Margin	Notes
1	17 May 1875	Nottinghamshire; Trent Bridge, Nottingham	Lost	93 runs	W Mycroft 5-53 and 5-67
2	28 May 1875	Lancashire; Old Trafford, Manchester	Drawn		W Mycroft 6-62 and 5-28; W McIntyre 6-71; W Hickton 5-38
3	21 Jun 1875	Kent; County Ground, Derby	Won	Innings and 63 runs	W Mycroft 5-42; W George 7-86
4	05 Jul 1875	Lancashire; County Ground, Derby	Lost	Innings and 62 runs	W Mycroft 9-80; A Appleby 6-55 and 5-38
5	19 Jul 1875	Kent; Private Banks Sports Ground, Catford Bridge	Won	Innings and 6 runs	W Mycroft 7-30 and 5-12
6	09 Aug 1875	Nottinghamshire; County Ground, Derby	Lost	117 runs	W Mycroft 7-55 and 5-63
7	30 Aug 1875	United North of England Eleven; Saltergate Ground, Chesterfield	Lost	90 runs	W Hickton 5-42; T Armitage 7-27 and 5-34; W Mycroft 6-44; A Hill 5-25

== Statistics ==
=== Cricketers who played and their first-class batting performances ===
Name	Am/ Pro	Age	Hand	Matches	Inns	Runs	High score	Average	100s
H Shaw	A	21	R	1	1	22	22	22.00	0
U Sowter	A	36	R	2	3	63	39	21.00	0
T Foster	P	26	R	7	12	227	36	18.91	0
R P Smith	A	26	R	7	12	218	39	18.17	0
W G Curgenven	A	33	R	3	5	90	71	18.00	0
J Smith	A	33	R	5	8	103	35	12.87	0
G Frost	A	26	R	7	12	141	36	11.75	0
R G Barlow	P	24	R	1	2	23	13	11.50	0
J T B D Platts	P	36	L	6	10	114	60	11.40	0
W Hickton	P	32	R	6	9	89	44	11.12	0
G Hay	A	24	R	5	8	62	16	8.85	0
W Rigley	P	23	R	4	7	56	30	8.00	0
S Richardson	A	30	R	2	4	27	22	6.75	0
A Smith		28	R	7	11	42	22	6.00	0
J Flint		25	R	3	6	29	9	5.80	0
W Mycroft	P	34	R	7	9	38	18*	4.22	0
A Shuker	A	26	R	2	4	14	6	4.66	0
J Tye	A	26	R	1	2	7	4	3.50	0
G Bradley	A	25	R	1	2	1	1	0.50	0

R Smith played another 6 innings in 3 other matches in which he scored 40 runs. W Mycroft played two other matches in which he scored 4 runs.

=== First-class bowling averages ===
Name	Hand	Balls	Runs	Wickets	BB	Average
W Mycroft	L F	2149	624	73	9-80	8.55
W Hickton	R F	1104	454	32	5-38	14.18
J Smith	R round	376	146	6	3-38	24.33
J T B D Platts	R F	400	200	5	2-44	40.00
G Hay	R round M	240	94	6	5-15	15.66
J Flint	R round S	172	116	3	1-23	38.66
R G Barlow	L M	24	15	1	1-15	15.00
T Foster	R round F	12	9	0		
G Bradley	?	28	17	0		

Mycroft took a further 17 first class wickets in other matches.

=== Wicket Keeping ===
- A Smith Catches 10, Stumping 2

== See also ==
- Derbyshire County Cricket Club seasons
- 1875 English cricket season
