= Derbyshire County Cricket Club in 1876 =

1876 season of an English cricket team

Derbyshire County Cricket Club seasons
1876 season
- Captain: Robert Smith
- Most runs: John Platts
- Most wickets: William Mycroft

Derbyshire County Cricket Club in 1876 was the cricket season when the English club Derbyshire played their sixth season.

Hampshire replaced Nottinghamshire as the third county to play Derbyshire, together with Lancashire and Kent. Derbyshire also played their first match against MCC, which was to become a regular feature. Mycroft achieved 17 wickets for 103 runs in a match which remains a record match analysis for Derbyshire.

The season was clouded with the death in a railway accident of Frederick Thornhill after just one chance to play for the county.

== 1876 season ==
All Derbyshire's matches were first class in the 1876 season. They played six county games, two each against Lancashire, Kent and Hampshire, and one match against MCC. Derbyshire lost both games against Lancashire, but were honours even with Kent and Hampshire, and beat MCC at Lords.

The captain for the year was Robert Smith. The side was well established but had three newcomers. Frederick Keeton, a licensed victualler, played the first of several seasons for Derbyshire and Amos Hind a framework knitter, also made his debut, to play one more season in 1877. Frederick Thornhill, a railway worker, played a single match for the club in June, but a month later on 23 July 1876 died at Toton Sidings, the largest marshalling yards of the Midland Railway. Three players who took part in Derbyshire's first match played their last season for Derbyshire, each appearing in one game. These were Unwin Sowter, John Burnham and John Tilson.

In the first match against Lancashire, Lancashire made 163 in their first innings, and Derbyshire replied with 60. They had to follow on, and achieving 78 in the second innings, lost by an innings. In the second match, their first against Hampshire Derbyshire scored 179 in the first innings and Hampshire made 98 in response and had to follow-on. Hampshire scored 156 in the second innings and Derbyshire made the necessary 80 with 8 wickets in hand. Against MCC Derbyshire opened with 229 with a contribution of 77 from Hind. MCC replied with 104 and managed 76 in the follow-on to give Derbyshire an innings victory. Against Kent, Derbyshire scored 107 in the first innings and Kent replied with 121. Derbyshire's second innings score of 170 set a target Kent could not achieve and they finished on 113 to give Derbyshire 43 run victory. In the second match against Lancashire, Derbyshire replied with 63 to Lancashire's 111. In the second innings Lancashire made 172 and Derbyshire ended the second innings 95 runs behind on 125. In the second match against Kent, Derbyshire made 147 in the first innings and Kent made 145. In the second innings Derbyshire made 112, and Kent were able to make the necessary 116 to win the match with two wickets in hand. In the last match against Hampshire, Derbyshire opened with 115 and Hampshire made 63 in reply. In the second innings Derbyshire made 91, but Hampshire went on to make 145 to win with one wicket in hand. Mycroft achieved a record match analysis of 17 wickets for 103 runs against Hampshire in the match.

John Platts was top scorer and William Mycroft took most wickets.

=== Matches ===
List of first-class matches
No.	Date	V	Result	Margin	Notes
1	1 Jun 1876	Lancashire; Old Trafford, Manchester	Lost	Innings and 25 runs	W Mycroft 6-71; W McIntyre 7-33 and 7-39
2	5 Jun 1876	Hampshire; County Ground, Derby	Won	8 Wickets	H Holmes 5-57
3	15 Jun 1876	MCC; Lord's Cricket Ground, St John's Wood	Won	Innings and 49 runs	W Mycroft 6-30 and 5-44
4	19 Jun 1876	Kent; County Ground, Derby	Won	43 runs	C Absolom 5-60 and 6-74; W Hickton 5-52 and 6-41
5	3 Jul 1876	Lancashire; County Ground, Derby	Lost	95 runs	A Watson 6-26; W McIntyre 6-59
6	20 Jul 1876	Kent; Higher Common Ground, Tunbridge Wells	Lost	2 wickets	W Foord-Kelcey 5-2'; J T B D Platts 6-68; GG Hearne 5-46; W Mycroft 5-51
7	24 Jul 1876	Hampshire; Day's (Antelope) Ground, Southampton	Lost	1 Wicket	J Galpin 5-42; A Ridley 5-70 and 6-42; W Mycroft 9-25 and 8-78

== Statistics ==
=== Cricketers who played and their first-class batting performances ===
Name	Am/ Pro	Age	Hand	Matches	Inns	Runs	High score	Average	100s
W Rigley	P	24	R	4	7	155	51	22.14	0
J T B D Platts	P	27	L	7	13	235	53	19.58	0
G Frost	A	27	R	4	7	109	52	18.16	0
J Smith	A	34	R	3	5	83	35	16.60	0
T Foster	P	27	R	7	12	193	43	16.08	0
W Hickton	P	33	R	4	7	71	30	14.20	0
A Hind		26	R	7	13	179	77	13.76	0
R P Smith	A	27	R	7	13	165	43	12.69	0
A Shuker	A	27	R	2	4	46	20	11.50	0
A Smith		29	R	7	12	59	19	8.42	0
W G Curgenven	A	34	R	4	7	52	13	7.42	0
W Mycroft	P	35	R	7	12	52	16	4.33	0
H Shaw	A	22	R	2	3	13	9	6.50	0
G Hay	A	25	R	3	5	19	9*	6.33	0
J W Burnham	A	36	R	1	2	12	8	6.00	0
S Richardson	A	32	R	4	7	36	14	5.14	0
F W Keeton	A	20	R	1	2	7	5	3.50	0
U Sowter	A	37	R	1	1	2	2	2.00	0
J Tilson	A	31	R	1	2	3	3	1.50	0
F Thornhill	A	29		1	2	0	0	0.00	0

Smith played two matches for North v South, two for a United North of England v United South of England and one for an All England, giving him a first-class run total of 327.

=== First-class bowling averages ===
Name	Hand	Balls	Runs	Wickets	BB	Average
W Mycroft	L F	1673	616	62	9-25	9.94
J T B D Platts	R F	802	436	25	6-68	17.44
W Hickton	R F	616	259	22	6-41	11.77
A Hind	R round M	434	139	8	3-23	17.37
G Hay	R round M	132	55	2	1-12	27.50
W Rigley		16	7	1	1-7	7.00

Mycroft played five games for MCC, one for an All England and one for a United North of England bringing his first class wicket total to 95.

=== Wicket Keeping ===
- A Smith Catches 13, Stumping 1

== See also ==
- Derbyshire County Cricket Club seasons
- 1876 English cricket season
