= Derbyshire County Cricket Club in 1871 =

1871 season of an English cricket team

Derbyshire County Cricket Club seasons
1871 season
- Captain: Samuel Richardson
- Most runs: Unwin Sowter
- Most wickets: Dove Gregory

Derbyshire county cricket opening season was in 1871 when Derbyshire County Cricket Club first competed in the county competition, having been founded the previous November.

== Foundation ==
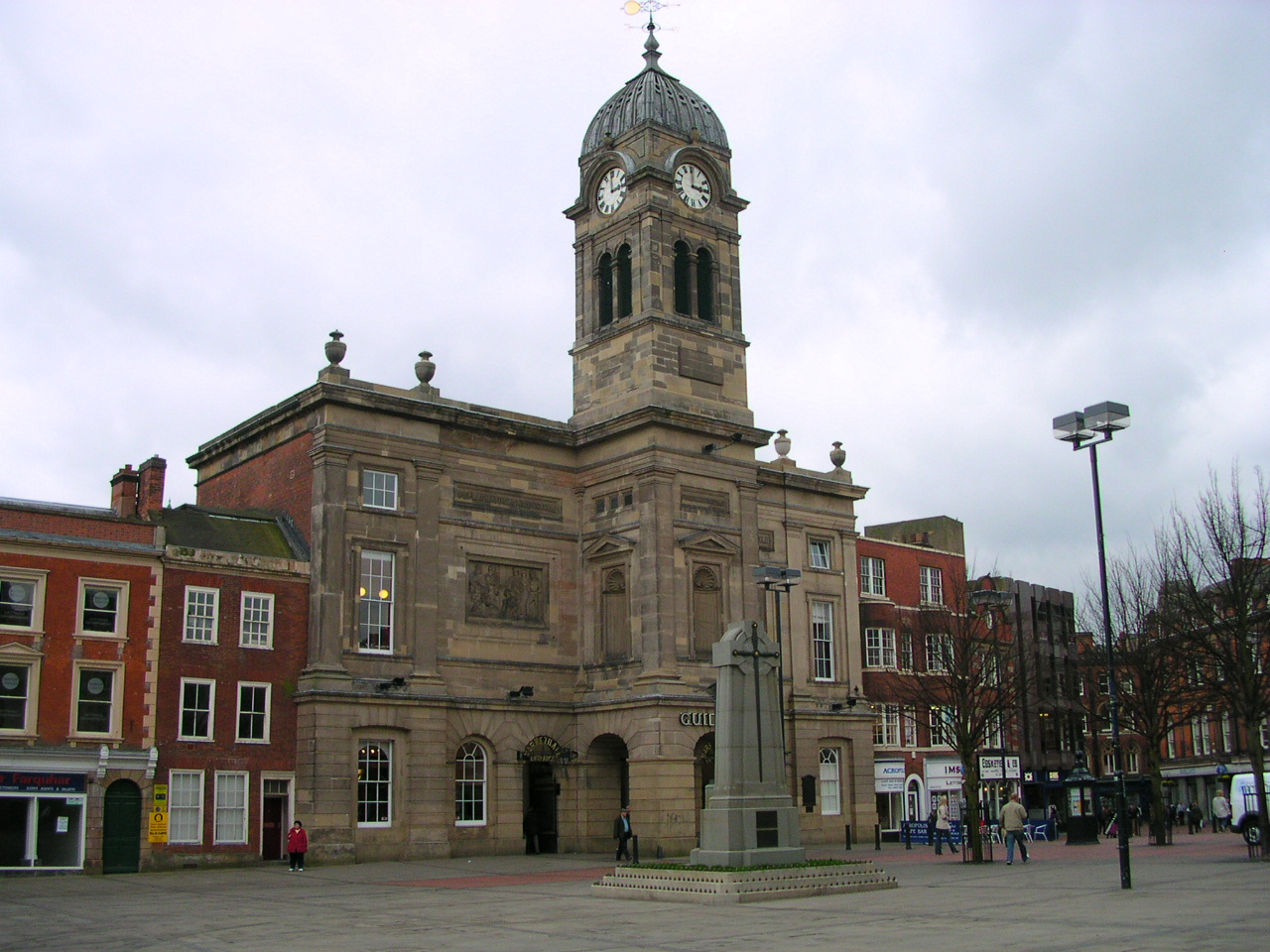
Derby Guildhall

Derbyshire CCC was formed for the county of Derbyshire on 4 November 1870 at a meeting in the Derby Guildhall. The Earl of Chesterfield who had played for and against All England Eleven was the first President, George Henry Strutt was vice president and Walter Boden, who had campaigned for the club's foundation for three years, was secretary. When Chesterfield died in 1871, William Jervis, a well connected lawyer, became president. The main problem that arose from the beginning was that of arranging matches against other counties. For the first three seasons only Lancashire County Cricket Club were willing to make fixtures.

== 1871 season ==
Derbyshire CCC played two matches in its first year, both against Lancashire CCC and joined the (then unofficial) County Championship. One match was won, and the other lost.

The club's first captain was Samuel Richardson, a gentleman's outfitter in the town of Derby. Derbyshire's bowling strength came from the professionals Dove Gregory who had played for a Derbyshire team in the 1850s, William Hickton a former Lancashire player and John Platts who was on the ground staff of MCC. Amateurs who began long careers with the club were Robert Smith (future captain) a farmer, John Smith a solicitor, Unwin Sowter a miller and baker, John Tilson a lace maker and John Burnham a clerk. Shorter careers were enjoyed by Thomas Attenborough a cattle dealer and Joseph Davidson a miner. Single appearances were made by Rev, Arthur Wilmot local rector, Edward Foley Oxford University student and vicar's son and James Billyeald a commercial traveller. Some had played for Gentlemen of Derbyshire, South Derbyshire and Derby Town.

The initial first-class match was at Old Trafford Cricket Ground on 26 and 27 May 1871. In this match the Lancashire batsmen were destroyed in their first innings by the pace of the Derbyshire fast bowler, Dove Gregory, who took six wickets for nine runs. They made a record low innings score of 25. Derbyshire replied with 147, and Lancashire failed in their second innings to achieve a combined total that surpassed it. In the return match in August, the club's first at the County Ground, Derbyshire replied with 80 to Lancashire's first innings score of 116, and with 58 to their second innings score of 84. Lancashire's Arthur Appleby did great damage with 6 for 38 and 7 for 21

=== Matches ===
List of matches
No.	Date	V	Result	Winning margin	Notes
1	26 May 1871	Lancashire; Old Trafford	Won	Innings and 11 runs	Dove Gregory 6-9; FR Reynolds 5-54
2	17 Aug 1871	Lancashire; County Ground, Derby	Lost	62 runs	Dove Gregory 5-57; A Appleby 6-38 and 7-21; John Platts 5-34

=== Batting performances ===
Name	Am/ Pro	Age	Hand	Matches	Inns	Runs	High	Ave	100s
Unwin Sowter	A	32	R	2	3	55	47*	27.50	0
James Billyeald	A	36	R	1	2	15	11*	15.00	0
John Burnham	A	31	R	2	3	35	31	11.66	0
Robert Smith	A	22	R	2	3	31	17	10.33	0
Samuel Richardson	A	26	R	2	3	30	25	10.00	0
Thomas Attenborough	A	37	R	2	3	28	20	9.33	0
William Hickton	P	28	R	2	3	26	13	8.66	0
Joseph Davidson	A	24	R	1	1	8	8	8.00	0
John Tilson	A	26	R	1	1	8	8	8.00	0
Dove Gregory	P	34	R	2	3	15	10	7.50	0
John Platts	P	32	L	2	3	16	12	5.33	0
John Smith	A	29	R	1	1	1	1	1.00	0
Edward Foley	A	19	R	1	2	0	0	0.00	0
Arthur Wilmot	A	26	?	1	2	0	0	0.00	0

=== Bowling performances ===
Name	Hand	Balls	Runs	Wickets	Average	Best
Dove Gregory	R F (round arm)	395	144	17	8.47	6-9
William Hickton	R F	347	147	12	12.25	4-16
John Platts	R F	84	38	8	4.75	5-34

=== Wicket Keeper ===
- Samuel Richardson; catches 1, stumping 1

== See also ==
- Derbyshire County Cricket Club seasons
- 1871 English cricket season
