= Derbyshire County Cricket Club in 1873 =

1873 season of an English cricket team

Derbyshire County Cricket Club seasons
1873 season
- Captain: Samuel Richardson
- Most runs: William Curgenven
- Most wickets: William Mycroft
- Most catches: William Curgenven

Derbyshire County Cricket Club in 1873 was the third cricket season which the English club Derbyshire played. Officials and supporters were disappointed that they had been unable to arrange further first-class fixtures than the two against Lancashire, but they managed to arrange an extra match against Nottinghamshire, who were a leading team at the time.

== 1873 season ==
Derbyshire played two first-class matches in their third year, both against Lancashire, and lost both. They also played a match against Nottinghamshire which they won having five additional players.

Samuel Richardson was captain in his third season. The death of bowler Dove Gregory on 21 May at the age of 35 left a potential hole, but it was amply filled by William Mycroft' an ironstone miner and later publican, making his debut in the season. Derbyshire further strengthened their side with the arrival of Alfort Smith as wicket-keeper from Lancashire, and Thomas Foster, both from the cotton mills of Glossop, and William Rigley a blacksmith. These three subsequently saw several years of service with the club. Other new players were Rev. William Humble, a local curate, who played occasionally over a few years, Thomas Howarth another cotton worked from Glossop who put in a single career first class appearance. Veteran president William Jervis, a lawyer, stepped in for one game. Additional players who made up the 16 member side against Nottinghamshire were John Frost, a joiner from Wirksworth, who played first-class for Derbyshire in the following season, Rev. Robert Moncreiff later 3rd Baron Moncreiff and unidentified players W Allen and Edward Tatlow.

In their first match against Lancashire, Derbyshire made 88 in the first innings, and Lancashire replied with 118. Derbyshire were all out for 52 in their second innings, no player scoring double figures, and Lancashire took the runs needed to win for the loss of one wicket. In the second match Lancashire set up a score of 238 in their first innings, and Derbyshire made 70 in response and followed on to make 86.

In the match against Nottinghamshire, played at Wirksworth, Derbyshire scored 116 in the first innings and got Nottinghamshire out for 14. In the follow-on, Nottinghamshire were all out for 72. Although Derbyshire had an advantage with 16 players to Nottinghamshire's 11, the result was astounding. The story has been handed down that before their innings, Nottinghamshire were lavishly entertained by a keen and generous supporter of Derbyshire who owned a wine and spirit business, where he blended potent and attractive spirit.

William Curgenven scored most runs in first-class matches, and William Mycroft took most wickets in the season.

=== Matches ===
List of first-class matches
No.	Date	V	Result	Margin	Notes
1	21 July 1873	Lancashire; County Ground, Derby	Lost	8 wickets	W Mycroft 6–35; W McIntyre 6–18
2	22 August 1873	Lancashire; Old Trafford, Manchester	Lost	Innings and 82 runs	A Watson 6–38 and 5–34

List of other matches
No.	Date	V	Result	Margin	Notes
1	4 September 1873	Nottinghamshire; Derby Road Ground, Wirksworth	Won	Innings and 30 runs	JC Shaw 6–40; J Flint 6–7

== Statistics ==
=== Cricketers who played and their first-class batting performances ===
Name	Am/ Pro	Age	Hand	Matches	Inns	Runs	High score	Average	100s
W Hickton	P	30	R	1	2	26	21*	26.00	0
W G Curgenven	A	31	R	2	4	61	39	15.25	0
T Foster	P	24	R	1	2	23	17	11.50	0
R P Smith	A	24	R	2	4	41	20	10.25	0
S Richardson	A	28	R	2	4	36	25	9.00	0
W Rigley	P	21	R	1	2	17	13	8.50	0
J Flint		23	R	1	2	15	11	7.50	0
WJ Humble	A	26	R	1	2	13	11	6.50	0
J T B D Platts	P	34	L	2	4	24	10	6.00	0
U Sowter	A	34	R	1	2	8	6	4.00	0
T Howarth	A	27	R	1	2	7	5	3.50	0
WM Jervis	A	46	R	1	2	6	6	3.00	0
J Davidson	A	26	R	2	4	6	4	3.00	0
JW Burnham	A	33	R	1	2	4	4	2.00	0
W Mycroft	P	32	R	2	4	4	3	1.33	0
A Smith		26	R	1	2	2	2	1.00	0
J Smith	A	31	R						
JH Frost	A	25	R						
R C Moncreiff	A	29	R						
W Allen	A		R						
E Tatlow	A		R						

=== First Class bowling averages ===
Name	Hand	Balls	Runs	Wickets	BB	Average
W Mycroft	L F	356	108	10	6–35	10.80
J T B D Platts	R F	148	66	4	2–17	16.50
J Davidson	R Off	152	63	3	2–18	21.00
W Rigley	R M	24	10	2	2–10	5.00
S Richardson		56	43	1	1–43	43.00
W Hickton	R F	96	48	1	1–48	48.00
J Flint	R Sl (round arm)	64	28	1	1–28	28.00

=== Wicket keeping ===
- S Richardson catches 1, stumping 0

== See also ==
- Derbyshire County Cricket Club seasons
- 1873 English cricket season
