= Samuel Richardson (cricketer) =

English cricketer

Sam Richardson
Personal information
- Full name: Samuel Richardson
- Born: 24 May 1844; Derby, England
- Died: 18 January 1938 (aged 93); Madrid, Spain
- Batting: Right-handed

Domestic team information
- Years: Team
- 1871–1878: Derbyshire
- FC debut: 26 May 1871 Derbyshire v Lancashire
- Last FC: 17 June 1878 Derbyshire v Kent

Career statistics
Competition	First-class
Matches	15
Runs scored	202
Batting average	7.48
100s/50s	0
Top score	25
Balls bowled	56
Wickets	1
Bowling average	43.00
5 wickets in innings	0
10 wickets in match	0
Best bowling	1/43
Catches/stumpings	8/1
- Source: CricketArchive, 30 January 2010

Samuel Richardson (24 May 1844 – 18 January 1938) was an English cricketer who played for Derbyshire between 1871 and 1878 and captained the side from 1871 to 1875. He was a member of the team that played Derbyshire's first match in May 1871 when he was captain and wicket-keeper. He fled the country after financial irregularities were found in connection with his administration of Derbyshire Cricket Club and Derby County.

== Early life and playing career ==
Richardson was born in Derby and became a gentleman's outfitter in the town. He was a proficient cricketer in the 1860s, playing for South Derbyshire Cricket Club, and was one of those present at the initial meeting that led to the founding of Derbyshire County Cricket Club in 1870. Richardson was elected as the first captain of Derbyshire and was wicket-keeper in their first match as a first-class side against Lancashire County Cricket Club in the 1871 season. This match, which the team won by an innings margin, held for 87 years the record for the lowest total ever scored against a Derbyshire county team. Derbyshire lost the return match. In the 1872 season Derbyshire lost both matches against Lancashire, and achieved the same result in the 1873 season. In the 1874 season Kent joined Lancashire in playing Derbyshire and three wins and a draw made Derbyshire a contender for Champion County. Richardson only played two of the four matches. In the 1875 season, his last as captain Alfort Smith joined the club as a regular wicket-keeper. Richardson played four matches during the 1876 season, but did not play in 1877. He made his final appearance for Derbyshire in the 1878 season when he played one match against Kent.

Richardson was a right-handed batsman and played 14 first-class matches and scored 202 runs. His average was 8.8 and his highest score 25. He was an occasional wicket-keeper and stumped once. As a bowler he took one wicket for 43 runs in 56 balls.

== Financial irregularities and exile ==
In 1880 Richardson became an administrator of the club, and in 1884 the remit was extended to the associated Derby County Football Club. By 1890 the cricket club was found to be in deep financial crisis. Fred Spofforth played a key part in identifying the fraud that had been committed. The cricket club's losses amounted to £1000 and the football club was also raided. Richardson admitted his guilt and fled the country in disgrace. He was later living in Madrid, under the name "John Roberts" and supposedly as Court Tailor to King Alfonso XII, the king who put the "Real" in "Real Madrid". During the Spanish Civil War he fell upon straitened circumstances and died at the age of 93 in Madrid. He was the longest-living member of the first representative Derbyshire cricket team.

Sporting positions
Preceded by	Derbyshire cricket captains 1871–1875	Succeeded by Robert Smith
