= John Tye =

John Tye may refer to:

- John Tye (cricketer) (1848–1905), an English cricketer who played for Derbyshire and Nottinghamshire
- John Tye (whistleblower) (born c. 1976), a 2014 whistleblower on U.S. intelligence operations
