= William Humble (cricketer) =

English clergyman and cricketer

Personal information
- Full name: William John Humble-Crofts
- Born: 9 December 1846; Sutton Scarsdale, England
- Died: 1 July 1924 (aged 77); Waldron, East Sussex, England
- Batting: Right-handed

Domestic team information
- Years: Team
- 1873–1878: Derbyshire
- FC debut: 22 August 1873 Derbyshire v Lancashire
- Last FC: 23 July 1877 Derbyshire v Hampshire

Career statistics
Competition	First-class
Matches	6
Runs scored	77
Batting average	6.55
100s/50s	0/0
Top score	19*
Catches/stumpings	8/–
- Source: CricketArchive, 10 August 2010

William John Humble-Crofts (9 December 1846 – 1 July 1924), born William Humble, was an English clergyman and cricketer who played for Derbyshire between 1873 and 1877.

== Biography ==
Humble was born in Sutton Scarsdale and was educated at Exeter College, Oxford, and took Holy Orders. In 1869 he was playing for Staveley against an All England XI and in 1874 for Worksop against the same team.

Humble made his debut for Derbyshire in the 1873 season and scored 11 in his first innings against Lancashire in a match which Derbyshire lost. In the 1874 season he played three first-class matches, and against Kent he made his top score of 19. He also played a couple of miscellaneous games for Derbyshire. In the 1877 season he played two first-class matches for Derbyshire which were both against Hampshire, in one of which Derbyshire's victory was spearheaded by a century by John Platts. Humble also played for Gentlemen of Derbyshire and later for Free Foresters.

Humble was a right-handed batsman lower-middle order batsman and played 10 innings in 6 first-class matches. He made a top score of 19 with an average of 8.55.

Humble changed his name to Humble-Crofts in 1879. He was vicar of Clayton-cum-Frickley, Yorkshire, in 1881, and in 1882 became rector of Waldron, East Sussex. He remained in this living until his death there at the age of 78.

Humble-Crofts' nephew, Archibald White, was club captain of Yorkshire between 1912 and 1918.
