= Thomas Mycroft =

English cricketer and umpire

Personal information
- Born: 28 March 1848; Brimington, Derbyshire, England
- Died: 31 August 1911 (aged 63); Mickleover, England
- Batting: Left-handed
- Bowling: Right-arm medium
- Role: Wicket-keeper
- Relatives: William Mycroft (brother)

Domestic team information
- Years: Team
- 1877–1887: Derbyshire
- 1878–1887: MCC
- FC debut: 16 July 1877 Derbyshire v Kent
- Last FC: 30 June 1887 MCC v Oxford University

Career statistics
Competition	First-class
Matches	24
Runs scored	249
Batting average	7.78
100s/50s	0/0
Top score	24*
Balls bowled	44
Wickets	0
Bowling average	–
5 wickets in innings	–
10 wickets in match	–
Best bowling	–
Catches/stumpings	43/16
- Source: CricketArchive, 7 June 2010

Thomas Mycroft (28 March 1848 — 31 August 1911) was an English cricketer who played for Derbyshire and MCC between 1877 and 1887.

Mycroft was born in Brimington, Derbyshire, the son of George Mycroft and his second wife Elizabeth Lowcock. His father was an ironstone and coal miner who kept the Red Lion public house at Brimington. Mycroft became an iron moulder. He was playing cricket for Chesterfield in 1871. His first-class career started in the 1877 season, when he made his debut for Derbyshire as wicket-keeper against Kent, scoring eight runs. He played one more match that season. In the 1878 season he played one game for Derbyshire against the All England XI but started playing predominantly for MCC. Derbyshire over the period was well served by their regular wicket-keepers Alfort Smith and James Disney. Mycroft played a large number of non-status matches for MCC against local clubs until 1883 and one or two first-class matches for MCC each year. In 1882 against Hampshire he took a rare bowling stint of 7 overs without gaining a wicket but scored 11 and 10 in his two innings.

In the 1884 season Mycroft played ten county matches for Derbyshire, and played two games for MCC. In 1885 he played a single MCC V Derbyshire match in which he had a small bowling spell for Derbyshire. In 1887 he played for South against North and his final match was for MCC against Oxford University. Mycroft was wicket keeper in all but two first-class games when he bowled in all 44 balls without a wicket. He was a left-handed batsman and played 46 innings in 24 first-class matches with a top score of 24 not out and an average of 7.78.

Mycroft returned to the game as an umpire, from 1897 to 1905, standing in two Test Matches.

Mycroft died in Mickleover at the age of 63. His half-brother, William, was a Derbyshire cricketer between 1873 and 1885.
