= George Hay (cricketer) =

English cricketer (1851–1913)

Personal information
- Born: 28 January 1851; Staveley, Derbyshire, England
- Died: 4 October 1913 (aged 62); Staveley, Derbyshire, England
- Batting: Right-handed
- Bowling: Right-arm fast-medium

Domestic team information
- Years: Team
- 1875–1886: Derbyshire
- 1882: MCC
- FC debut: 21 June 1875 Derbyshire v Kent
- Last FC: 7 July 1887 Players of the North v Players of the South

Career statistics
Competition	First-class
Matches	55
Runs scored	669
Batting average	9.57
100s/50s	0/0
Top score	49
Balls bowled	6,309
Wickets	148
Bowling average	16.51
5 wickets in innings	8
10 wickets in match	1
Best bowling	6/16
Catches/stumpings	34/–
- Source: CricketArchive, 17 August 2010

George Hay (28 January 1851 – 4 October 1913) was an English cricketer who played for Derbyshire between 1875 and 1886.

Hay was born at Staveley and became a professional cricketer playing at Manningham, Bradford from 1873 to 1875. His debut season for Derbyshire in the 1875 season saw him play in four county matches, his first, an innings victory over Kent, in which he took a five-wicket haul in the second innings, chosen ahead of the usual bowling pair of William Mycroft and William Hickton. He followed this up with two County matches in the 1876 season. In 1877 Hay was playing professionally for Eland and played just one first-class match for Derbyshire in the 1875 season, scoring 31 not out, the highest score of his career thus far.

Hay was back with Derbyshire in the 1878 season, still beating Hickton to the mantle of second-choice bowler, though now he had to shake competition off from John Platts, in the same position. Though he never played as often as he did during the 1878 season on any further occasions, Hay's round-arm bowling was at times preferred to John Platts' occasional deceptively-layered pace. In the 1879 season Hay put in fewer games for Derbyshire as he was playing for Keighley.

In the 1880 season, Derbyshire's first match of the season was against the touring Australians, fresh in their existence as a Test nation and with several young players at their disposal. The Derbyshire bowling pair of Mycroft and Hay dealt soundly with the Australians, but then the same treatment was dealt to the Derbyshire team in a second-innings eight-wicket haul by Fred Spofforth. Hay then played four more non-status games against the Australians – for a scratch Derbyshire team, for Keighley and twice for Wermeth, maintaining his duel with Spofforth who was later to become a Derbyshire captain. Hay appeared in eight county matches for the team during 1880, scoring more runs in this season than in any other of his career. The 1881 season was nearly as successful, with Hay playing in six county matches, Derbyshire winning two. From there on, Hay was on the playing staff of Marylebone Cricket Club (MCC) where he played matches against minor counties, while still putting in five games for Derbyshire over the next five years. His two final first-class matches were in teams made up of a variety of players from all the major cricketing counties.

Hay was a right-arm round-arm fast-medium bowler and took 148 first-class wickets at an average of 16.51 and a best performance of 6–16. He was a right-handed batsman and played 94 innings in 55 first-class matches with a top score of 49 and an average of 8.57.

Hay umpired one first-class game in 1884 and after his retirement from playing, he took charge of nearly 70 first-class matches between 1887 and 1897, including several in the early years of the County Championship with a final game in 1902.

Hay also played football, and was a goalkeeper for Staveley F.C., then an important club. It was in a game in January 1889 against Grimsby Town that William Cropper, Hay's friend and teammate at Staveley and Derbyshire County Cricket Club, collapsed after a collision on the pitch. The collision resulted in a ruptured bowel and Cropper died in Hay's arms in the dressing room.

Hay died at Staveley at the age of 62.
