= William Hickton (cricketer, born 1884) =

English cricketer

Cricket information
- Batting: Right-handed
- Bowling: Slow left arm orthodox

Career statistics
Competition	First-class
Matches	5
Runs scored	41
Batting average	4.55
100s/50s	0/0
Top score	17
Balls bowled	192
Wickets	2
Bowling average	52.00
5 wickets in innings	0
10 wickets in match	0
Best bowling	1/9
Catches/stumpings	2/–
- Source: CricInfo, 7 November 2022

William Henry Hickton (28 August 1884 – 8 April 1942) was an English first-class cricketer who played in five matches for Worcestershire in the space of little over a month in 1909. He took only two wickets: those of Warwickshire's Charles Baker and Middlesex's Harold Wyatt.

Hickton was born in Lower Broughton, Salford, Lancashire; he died in Leeds, West Riding of Yorkshire at the age of 58.

His father, also named William, had a longer first-class career, playing 60 games in the 1860s and 1870s.
