= Frederick Thornhill =

English cricketer

Personal information
- Born: 25 September 1846; Beeston, Nottinghamshire, England
- Died: 23 July 1876 (aged 29); Toton Sidings, England
- Batting: Right-handed

Domestic team information
- Years: Team
- 1876: Derbyshire
- Only FC: 1 June 1876 Derbyshire v Lancashire

Career statistics
Competition	First-class
Matches	1
Runs scored	0
Batting average	0.00
100s/50s	0/0
Top score	0
Catches/stumpings	0/–
- Source: CricketArchive, 17 January 2011

Frederick Thornhill (25 September 1846 – 23 July 1876) was an English cricketer who played first-class cricket for Derbyshire in 1876.

Thornhill was born in Beeston, Nottinghamshire, the son of Richard Thornhill (1817–1896) and his wife Eliza Reynolds (1824–1907) and became an engine stoker and later a guard for the Midland Railway. He took part in a cricket match playing for Birmingham in 1866. He made a single appearance for Derbyshire in the 1876 season, against Lancashire in June, when he mode no score in either innings.

Just over a month later, Thornhill died at the age of 29 at Toton Sidings, the largest marshalling yards of the Midland Railway.

Thornhill married Elizabeth Bywater on 19 November 1867 in St John the Baptist Church, Beeston. They had the following children:

- Elizabeth Thornhill (1868–1956)
- Frederick Thornhill (b. 1870)
- Mary Ann Thornhill (1872–1948)
- Annie Maria Thornhill (1875–1951)
- Emily Thornhill (1876–1946)
