= Joseph Flint =

English cricketer (1840–1912)

Personal information
- Full name: Joseph Flint
- Born: 23 April 1840; Wirksworth, Derbyshire
- Died: 2 November 1912 (aged 72); Wirksworth, Derbyshire
- Batting: Right-handed
- Bowling: Right-arm slow

Domestic team information
- Years: Team
- 1872–1879: Derbyshire
- FC debut: 28 June 1872 Derbyshire v Lancashire
- Last FC: 23 June 1879 Derbyshire v Lancashire

Career statistics
Competition	First-class
Matches	14
Runs scored	143
Batting average	6.80
100s/50s	0/0
Top score	24
Balls bowled	1,400
Wickets	44
Bowling average	13.65
5 wickets in innings	0
10 wickets in match	0
Best bowling	6/28
Catches/stumpings	11/–
- Source: CricketArchive, 16 December 2010

Joseph Flint (23 April 1840 – 2 November 1912) was an English cricketer who played for Derbyshire between 1872 and 1879.

Flint was born at Wirksworth, Derbyshire, the son of James Flint, a lead miner, and his wife Elizabeth.

In 1870 Flint played for a Wirksworth team against an All-England XI with George Frost who followed him to Derbyshire. He debuted for Derbyshire in the 1872 season in a match against Lancashire, when he took two wickets and scored 13 and 19 not out. He played the return match against Lancashire that year, and also played for Derbyshire against the Queen's Club. He played one first-class game against Lancashire in the 1873 season and also appeared for Derbyshire in an additional fixture against Nottinghamshire. He appeared in all four first-class matches played by Derbyshire during the 1874 season and took 18 wickets. He also appeared in the miscellaneous games against Nottinghamshire, Yorkshire and United South of England. He also made an appearance for Leicestershire against an ALl England Eleven. In the 1875 season he played three games and also played for Rochdale against an All England XI. He did not appear again until the 1878 season when he took six wickets for 28 in his return game against Lancashire. He also played for Buxton against the Australians. He played two more games in the 1879 season.

Flint was a right-arm round-arm slow bowler who took 44 wickets at an average of 13.65, with a best performance of 6-28. He was a right-handed batsman who played 24 innings in 14 first-class matches, with a top score of 24 and an average of 6.8.

Flint died at Wirksworth at the age of 72.
