= George Bradley (cricketer) =

English cricketer

Personal information
- Born: 29 April 1850; Derby, England
- Died: 24 April 1887 (aged 36); Litchurch, England
- Batting: Right-handed

Domestic team information
- Years: Team
- 1875: Derbyshire
- Only FC: 9 August 1875 Derbyshire v Nottinghamshire

Career statistics
Competition	First-class
Matches	1
Runs scored	1
Batting average	0.50
100s/50s	0/0
Top score	1
Balls bowled	28
Wickets	0
Bowling average	–
5 wickets in innings	–
10 wickets in match	–
Best bowling	–
Catches/stumpings	0/–
- Source: CricketArchive, 28 December 2010

George Bradley (29 April 1850 – 24 April 1887) was an English cricketer who played for Derbyshire in 1875.

Bradley was born in Derby and became a house painter living in Derby. He played one match for Derbyshire in the 1875 season against Nottinghamshire. Bradley was a right-handed batsman and made one run in his two innings. He was a right-arm bowler and bowled economically during the game, though he failed to take any wickets for 17 runs.

Bradley died in Litchurch, Derby shortly before his 37th birthday.
