= Thomas Howarth =

English cricketer (1845–1897)

Personal information
- Full name: Thomas Howarth
- Born: 10 May 1845; Glossop, Derbyshire, England
- Died: 12 October 1897 (aged 52); Fylde, Lancashire, England
- Batting: Right-handed

Domestic team information
- Years: Team
- 1873: Derbyshire
- Only FC: 23 August 1873 Derbyshire v Lancashire

Career statistics
Competition	First-class
Matches	1
Runs scored	7
Batting average	3.50
100s/50s	0/0
Top score	7
Catches/stumpings	1/–
- Source: CricketArchive, 4 February 2023

Thomas Howarth (10 May 1845 – 12 October 1897) was an English cricketer who played for Derbyshire in 1873.

Howarth was born in Glossop, Derbyshire and became a cotton weaver. He played for Derbyshire in the 1873 season in one first-class match against Lancashire in August, scoring seven runs in the two innings. He played for his Glossop club and in 1874 in a match against the United South of England Eleven was bowled out in turn by W. G. Grace and James Lillywhite.

Howarth died in Fylde, Lancashire at the age of 52.
