= John Frost (cricketer) =

English cricketer (1847–1916)

Personal information
- Full name: John Henry Frost
- Born: 30 January 1847; Wirksworth, Derbyshire, England
- Died: 1 November 1916 (aged 69); Ashover, England
- Batting: Right-handed
- Relatives: George Frost (brother)

Domestic team information
- Years: Team
- 1874: Derbyshire
- Only First-class: 13 July 1874 Derbyshire v Kent

Career statistics
Competition	First-class
Matches	1
Runs scored	19
Batting average	9.50
100s/50s	0/0
Top score	18
Catches/stumpings	2/–
- Source: CricketArchive, 20 December 2010

John Henry Frost (30 January 1847 – 1 November 1916) was an English first-class cricketer who played for Derbyshire in 1874.

Frost was born in Wirksworth, the son of George Frost, a farmer/builder, and his wife Mary. He became a joiner and played cricket for Wirksworth - taking part in matches against All England XI in 1868 and 1870

Frost played for Derbyshire in the 1873 season in a miscellaneous match against Nottinghamshire. He made his debut and only first-class appearance during the 1874 season, a victory against Kent. Frost was an upper-order batsman and played alongside his brother George Frost for a 41-run second-wicket partnership. His brother had first played for Derbyshire two years previously and had a much longer career, playing 37 games between 1872 and 1880. Frost played one extra game in 1874 a match against the United South of England. In 1883 and 1884 Frost played several games for Staffordshire.

Frost died in Ashover at the age of 69.
