= Derbyshire County Cricket Club in 1872 =

1872 season of an English cricket team

Derbyshire County Cricket Club seasons
1872 season
- Captain: Samuel Richardson
- Most runs: Thomas Attenborough
- Most wickets: Dove Gregory
- Most catches: Richard Allsop

The 1872 cricket season was the second in which Derbyshire County Cricket Club played first-class matches. The team was captained by Samuel Richardson. Two matches were arranged against Lancashire County Cricket Club and Derbyshire lost both. Derbyshire also played a match against Prince's Club at their ground in Chelsea, which ended in a draw.

== 1872 season ==
Samuel Richardson was captain in his second season. The season saw the arrival of three Wirksworth players Joseph Flint, George Frost and Richard Allsop. Frost and Allsop were both joiners. William Curgenven, a doctor, who had been party to the club's foundation also made his debut. George Cammell, Old Etonian of Brookfield Manor made his single appearance for Derbyshire in the match against Prince's Club. The season was the last in which Derbyshire's star bowler Dove Gregory played before his death the following February.

In the first match Lancashire set up a score of 201, and Derbyshire managed 75 in their first innings and 51 in the follow-on. In the match against Queen's Club, Queens opened with 85 and Derbyshire responded with 173. Queens were on 54 for 9 needing 34 to avoid an innings defeat when the two-day match ended in a draw. In this match, Derbyshire player John Burnham played for Prince's Club. In the second Lancashire match Lancashire set up a score of 137 and Derbyshire responded with 42 and 69 in the follow-on. Lancashire's William McIntyre took 22 Derbyshire wickets in the two matches. Thomas Attenborough scored most first class runs for Derbyshire, and Dove Gregory took most wickets. Richard Allsop took most catches.

=== Matches ===
List of first-class matches
No.	Date	V	Result	Margin	Notes
1	28 Jun 1872	Lancashire; Old Trafford, Manchester	Lost	Innings and 75 runs	Dove Gregory 5-70; W McIntyre 5-44 and 5-24
2	09 Aug 1872	Lancashire; At County Ground, Derby	Lost	Innings and 26 runs	W McIntyre 5-16 and 7-23

List of other matches
No.	Date	V	Result	Margin	Notes
1	22 Jul 1872	Prince's Club; Prince's Cricket Ground, Chelsea	Drawn		J Flint 7-46; E Willsher 5-72

== Statistics ==
=== Cricketers who played and their first-class batting performances ===
Name	Am/ Pro	Age	Hand	Matches	Inns	Runs	High score	Average	100s
J Flint		22	R	2	4	38	19*	12.66	0
W G Curgenven	A	30	R	1	2	25	16	12.50	0
T Attenborough	A	38	R	2	4	44	27	11.00	0
R P Smith	A	23	R	2	4	33	17	8.25	0
J Tilson	A	27	R	1	2	15	14	7.50	0
G Frost		22	R	1	2	14	13	7.00	0
S Richardson	A	27	R	2	4	27	15	6.75	0
W Hickton	P	29	R	2	4	15	7	5.00	0
R Allsop		22	R	1	2	5	5	2.50	0
J T B D Platts	P	33	L	2	4	8	4	2.00	0
D Gregory	P	35	R	2	4	4	3	2.00	0
JW Burnham	A	32	R	2	4	4	3	1.00	
J Smith	A	30	R	1	2	2	2	1.00	0
U Sowter	A	33	R	1	2	0	0	0.00	0
GH Cammell	A	20	R						

=== First Class bowling performances ===
Name	Hand	Balls	Runs	Wickets	BB	Average
D Gregory	R F (round arm)	267	111	8	5-70	13.87
J T B D Platts	R F	176	98	5	5-51	19.60
J Flint	R Sl (round arm)	112	39	4	2-17	9.75
W Hickton	R F	168	74	2	2-56	37.00
T Attenborough	L Sl	12	5	0		

=== Wicket keeping ===
- S Richardson catches 1, stumping 0

== See also ==
- Derbyshire County Cricket Club seasons
- 1872 English cricket season
