= William Rigley =

English cricketer

Personal information
- Born: 24 March 1852; Eastwood, Nottinghamshire, England
- Died: 15 April 1897 (aged 45); Nottingham, England
- Batting: Right-handed
- Bowling: Right-arm medium

Domestic team information
- Years: Team
- 1873–1882: Derbyshire
- 1893–1894: Players of United States of America
- FC debut: 22 August 1873 Derbyshire v Lancashire
- Last FC: 14 September 1894 Players of USA v Gentlemen of Philadelphia

Career statistics
Competition	First-class
Matches	66
Runs scored	1510
Batting average	12.58
100s/50s	0/5
Top score	69
Balls bowled	69
Wickets	5
Bowling average	8.00
5 wickets in innings	0
10 wickets in match	0
Best bowling	2/10
Catches/stumpings	25/–
- Source: CricketArchive, 17 December 2010

William Rigley (24 March 1852 – 15 April 1897) was an English cricketer who played for Derbyshire between 1873 and 1882.

Rigley was born in Eastwood, Nottinghamshire, the son of John Rigley and his wife Ann. His father was a blacksmith and moved to Somercotes, Derbyshire. Rigley also became a blacksmith. He made his cricketing debut for Derbyshire in the 1873 season against Lancashire when he achieved his best bowling performance of 2 wickets for 10 runs. He played a non-first-class match against Nottinghamshire. In the 1874 season he only played non-first-class matches for Derbyshire against Nottinghamshire, Yorkshire and United South of England. He also played for Colts of England against MCC. He began playing regularly for Derbyshire in the 1875 season playing four games in that year and four in the 1876 season when he achieved the top batting average of 22.4. In the 1877 season he played all nine first-class matches for the club. In the 1878 season he played all twelve first-class matches for the club and one other and made his top score of 69 against Lancashire. Rigley also played two first-class matches for Players against the Australians in a promotional tour of England during 1878 and another miscellaneous match against the Australians for Hull He played a lacklustre season in all matches for Derbyshire in the 1879 season but played several other games including two for London Counties and one for United North of England in 1879. In the 1880 season his form recovered and he made 65 against Sussex. He also played in an extra scratch Derbyshire team against the Australians again in 1880 and played for Players of the North in a first-class match. He played a full season in the 1881 season and in his final 1882 season played four matches. Rigley was a right-handed batsman who played 108 innings in 58 first-class matches for Derbyshire with a top score of 69 and an average of 12.24. For Derbyshire he took 3 wickets with an average of 10.00 and a best performance of 2–10

In 1881, Rigley was living with his family at Somercotes where he was an engine-smith. After his retirement from the Derbyshire team, he became a first-class umpire, and umpired for three seasons until 1884. In 1893/94 he took part in a tour of America, playing for the Players of America and bowled 13 balls to take 2 wickets for 10 runs in one match.

In all first-class games he played 121 innings in 66 matches. He was an occasional right-arm medium-pace bowler and took a total of five wickets.

At one time he coached cricket at Wellington College.

Rigley died in Nottingham at the age of 45.
