= Thomas Foster (Derbyshire cricketer) =

English cricketer

Personal information
- Born: 15 December 1848; Glossop, England
- Died: 22 March 1929 (aged 80); East Glossop, England
- Batting: Right-handed
- Bowling: Right-arm fast
- Role: Occasional wicket-keeper

Domestic team information
- Years: Team
- 1873–1884: Derbyshire
- FC debut: 21 July 1873 Derbyshire v Lancashire
- Last FC: 25 August 1884 Derbyshire v Yorkshire

Career statistics
Competition	First-class
Matches	90
Runs scored	2,594
Batting average	16.11
100s/50s	1/8
Top score	101
Balls bowled	437
Wickets	9
Bowling average	25.88
5 wickets in innings	0
10 wickets in match	0
Best bowling	2/18
Catches/stumpings	64/–
- Source: CricketArchive, 21 July 2010

Thomas Foster (15 December 1848 – 22 March 1929) was an English cricketer who played for Derbyshire between 1873 and 1884. He topped the scoring for the club in three seasons.

Foster was born in Mill Town, Glossop, the son of Robert Foster a cotton weaver. He started playing cricket for local Glossop clubs but went professional with the Clifford Club, in Manchester in 1872.

In the following 1873 season, Foster made his debut for Derbyshire in a match against Lancashire playing in the middle order to make 17 and 8, although the match was lost. He made a similar performance in one match in the 1874 season in a victory against Kent, when he also took a wicket. Foster came into his own during the 1875 season, making several excellent appearances at the crease in the middle-order during this season in some good wins for Derbyshire. He was top scorer for the club in the season with 227 runs He played all the club's matches in the 1876, 1877 and 1878 seasons with steady batting, but none to match 1875. In the 1879 season, he was top scorer again with 269 and topped the batting averages, while in the 1880 season he made 322 to become top scorer again. In 1880 he played as part of a Gentlemen v. Players match. He played regularly in the 1881, 1882 and 1883 seasons. In his final year at the club, in the 1884 season, he played five games, dropping to the tailend in the final fixture of his career and losing out to Yorkshire in his final match. While playing for Derbyshire he played at club level for Glossop, the Raistrick Club in Yorkshire and for Market Bosworth.

Foster was a right-handed batsman and played 167 innings in 90 first-class matches. His top score was 101 and his average 16.11. He was also an occasional wicket-keeper and a right-arm round-arm fast bowler taking 9 wickets at an average of 25.88.

Before 1881 he had become a licensed victualler, running the "Arundel Arms", a pub with accommodation, at Glossop or Hadfield and by 1883 he was running the "Pear Tree" at East Glossop.

Foster returned to the game as an umpire, being active in 1889. During the 1892 season, Foster umpired ten first-class matches in the County Championship.

Foster married Hannah Woodward and had a family. He died in East Glossop at the age of 81.

Foster was of no relation to Fostershire, the seven brothers, all surnamed Foster, who played for Worcestershire in the early 20th century.
