= Amos Hind =

English cricketer

Personal information
- Born: 1 February 1849; Calverton, Nottinghamshire, England
- Died: 27 April 1931 (aged 82); Calverton, Nottinghamshire, England
- Batting: Right-handed
- Bowling: Right-arm medium
- Relatives: Samuel Hind (brother)

Domestic team information
- Years: Team
- 1876–1877: Derbyshire
- FC debut: 1 June 1876 Derbyshire v Lancashire
- Last FC: 20 August 1877 Derbyshire v Yorkshire

Career statistics
Competition	First-class
Matches	16
Runs scored	392
Batting average	13.06
100s/50s	0/1
Top score	77
Balls bowled	1,130
Wickets	24
Bowling average	17.45
5 wickets in innings	0
10 wickets in match	0
Best bowling	4/9
Catches/stumpings	4/–
- Source: CricketArchive, 17 January 2011

Amos Hind (1 February 1849 – 27 April 1931) was an English cricketer. who played first-class cricket for Derbyshire between 1876 and 1877.

Hind was born at Calverton, Nottinghamshire, the son of John Hind, a framework knitter and his wife Hannah.

Hind debuted for Derbyshire in the 1876 season, against Lancashire, batting in two very steady innings, in the first of which he scored half of Derbyshire's run total. He made his highest score of 77 in his third match for the club, an innings victory over Marylebone Cricket Club (MCC). Hind continued to play steadily in the upper-middle order for most of the rest of the 1876 season. At the start of the 1877 season, Hind hit a rough patch in his batting form, and was at times replaced in the batting order by Charles Regan. However he achieved his best bowling performance with 4–9 against MCC and managed an innings of 43 against Hampshire in his penultimate first-class fixture.

Hind was a right-handed batsman and played 30 innings in 16 first-class matches with a top score of 77 and an average of 13.06. He was also a right-arm round-arm medium pace bowler who took 24 wickets at an average of 17.45 and a best performance of 4–9.

In 1880, Hind took eight wickets in total for Halifax in a match against Gentlemen of Canada, a team which included former Nottinghamshire player Walter Wright. He was a framework knitter and in 1881 was unmarried and living with his parents at Calverton.

Hind died in Calverton at the age of 82.

Hind's younger brother, Samuel Hind, played first-class cricket between 1877 and 1878 for Nottinghamshire.
