= Edward Estridge =

English cricketer

Personal information
- Born: 28 April 1843; Hounslow, Middlesex, England
- Died: 30 August 1919 (aged 76); Abingdon, Oxfordshire, England
- Batting: Right-handed

Domestic team information
- Years: Team
- 1874: Derbyshire
- Only FC: 3 August 1874 Derbyshire v Lancashire

Career statistics
Competition	First-class
Matches	1
Runs scored	4
Batting average	4.00
100s/50s	0/0
Top score	4
Catches/stumpings	0/–
- Source: CricketArchive, 20 December 2010

Edward Estridge (28 April 1843 – 30 August 1919) was an English cricketer who played for Derbyshire in 1874.

Estridge was born in Hounslow, Middlesex. He was educated at Tonbridge School and Trinity College, Oxford. He played for the Gentlemen of Kent from 1863 to 1866 and for the Incogniti from 1867 to 1871. He became an assistant master at Repton School.

Estridge made his debut in his only match for Derbyshire in the 1874 season against Lancashire, when as a lower-order batsman, he was run out for 4.

Estridge died in Abingdon at the age of 76.
