= Richard Allsop =

English cricketer (1849–1908)

Personal information
- Full name: Richard Allsop
- Born: 10 June 1849; Wirksworth, Derbyshire
- Died: 20 March 1908 (aged 58); Burton-on-Trent, Staffordshire
- Batting: Right-handed

Domestic team information
- Years: Team
- 1872–1874: Derbyshire County Cricket Club
- FC debut: 28 June 1872 Derbyshire v Lancashire
- Last FC: 23 July 1874 Derbyshire v Kent

Career statistics
Competition	First-class
Matches	3
Runs scored	42
Batting average	8.40
100s/50s	0/0
Top score	33
Catches/stumpings	3/–
- Source: CricketArchive, 9 August 2008

Richard Allsop (10 June 1849 – 20 March 1908) was an English cricketer who played for Derbyshire County Cricket Club between 1872 and 1874.

Allsop was born at Wirksworth, Derbyshire, the son of Samuel Allsop, a journeyman joiner, and his wife Ann. By 1871, he was a joiner himself, living with the family at St John Street. He played club cricket for Wirksworth and Burton Cricket Clubs before making his first-class debut for Derbyshire in the 1872 season against Lancashire. He played two further first-class matches for the county in the 1874 season as well as making non-first-class appearances for the side.

Allsop died at Burton-on-Trent in Staffordshire in 1908 at the age of 68.
