= Thomas Attenborough =

English cricketer (1833–1907)

Personal information
- Full name: Thomas Attenborough
- Born: 18 July 1833; Ilkeston, Derbyshire, England
- Died: 21 January 1907 (aged 73); Ilkeston, England
- Batting: Right-handed
- Bowling: Slow left-arm

Domestic team information
- Years: Team
- 1871–1874: Derbyshire
- FC debut: 26 May 1871 Derbyshire v Lancashire
- Last FC: 3 August 1874 Derbyshire v Lancashire

Career statistics
Competition	First-class
Matches	6
Runs scored	72
Batting average	8.00
100s/50s	0/0
Top score	27
Balls bowled	60
Wickets	2
Bowling average	14.50
5 wickets in innings	0
10 wickets in match	0
Best bowling	1/9
Catches/stumpings	2/–
- Source: CricketArchive, 10 August 2010

Thomas Attenborough (18 July 1833 – 21 January 1907) was an English cricketer who played for Derbyshire between 1871 and 1874. He was a member of the team that played Derbyshire's first match in May 1871.

Attenborough was born at Ilkeston, Derbyshire, and was a cattle dealer.

Attenborough first represented Derbyshire in the 1871 season, playing in the match that is regarded as the team's first-ever first-class game, against Lancashire, as an upper order batsman. Derbyshire won the match by an innings margin, and Lancashire's first innings of just 25 held the record for the lowest score achieved against Derbyshire in first-class cricket for 87 years.

Attenborough played in the second fixture against Lancashire in 1871 and in the two Derbyshire matches, again against Lancashire in the 1872 season when he was the club's top scorer with 44 runs in the two games. Attenborough played his last two games for Derbyshire in the 1874 season against Lancashire.

Attenborough was an upper-order right-handed batsman and played nine innings in six first-class matches with an average of 8.00 and a top score of 27. He was a slow left-arm bowler and took two first-class wickets at a cost of 29 runs.

Attenborough died at Ilkeston at the age of 73. He was found dead with his throat cut at his home.
