= Abraham Shuker =

English cricketer and schoolmaster

Personal information
- Born: 6 July 1848; Stockton, Shropshire, England
- Died: 11 February 1909 (aged 60); Tunstall, Staffordshire, England
- Batting: Right-handed

Domestic team information
- Years: Team
- 1874–1882: Derbyshire
- FC debut: 5 June 1874 Derbyshire v Lancashire
- Last FC: 5 June 1882 Derbyshire v Sussex

Career statistics
Competition	First-class
Matches	22
Runs scored	601
Batting average	15.81
100s/50s	0/2
Top score	86
Catches/stumpings	12/–
- Source: CricketArchive, 20 December 2010

Abraham Shuker (6 July 1848 – 11 February 1909) was an English schoolmaster and cricketer who played first-class cricket for Derbyshire between 1874 and 1882.

Shuker was born in Stockton, Shropshire, the son of John Shuker, a bailiff, and his wife Charlotte. He was educated at Brewood School, Staffordshire, and St John's College, Cambridge, where he graduated BA in 1872 and MA in 1879. On leaving university he became a master at Trent College.

Shuker played for Staffordshire in 1873 and joined Derbyshire in the 1874 season where he made his first-class debut In his first match he opened the batting to score 41 runs, in a win against Lancashire. His second first-class game was the return match against Lancashire and he also played in a scratch side against Nottinghamshire. He played two first-class matches a season without making much impression in 1875, 1876 and 1877. He played three first-class matches in the 1878 season and again in the 1879 season when he played an additional match for the club against Harrow Wanderers. In the 1880 season, he played four matches and hit 55 against Sussex to top the batting averages for the season. In the 1881 season he played three matches and scored 45 against Sussex. In the 1882 season, he played one match which was his last in June against Sussex, and opened with Duncan Johnston to make his top score of 86.

Shuker was a right-handed batsman and played 40 innings in 22 first-class matches with an average of 15.81 and a top score of 86.

Shuker retired from Trent College in 1904 after 32 years, having just established the Trent Association. He died at Chell House in Tunstall, Staffordshire at the age of 60.
