= Samuel Hind =

English cricketer

Personal information
- Born: 14 December 1850; Calverton, Nottinghamshire, England
- Died: 28 March 1923 (aged 72); Calverton, Nottinghamshire, England
- Batting: Right-handed
- Bowling: Left-arm fast
- Relatives: Amos Hind (brother)

Domestic team information
- Years: Team
- 1877–1878: Nottinghamshire

Career statistics
Competition	First-class
Matches	6
Runs scored	90
Batting average	9.00
100s/50s	0/0
Top score	22
Balls bowled	96
Wickets	0
Bowling average	–
5 wickets in innings	–
10 wickets in match	–
Best bowling	–
Catches/stumpings	2/–
- Source: Cricinfo, 22 February 2013

Samuel Hind (14 December 1850 – 28 March 1923) was an English cricketer. Hind was a right-handed batsman who bowled left-arm roundarm fast. He was born at Calverton, Nottinghamshire.

Hind made his first-class debut for Nottinghamshire against Kent in 1877 at the St Lawrence Ground, Canterbury. He made four further first-class appearances for the county in that season, before making a final appearance against Kent the following season. In his total of six first-class matches, Hind scored a total of 90 runs at an average of 9.00, with a high score of 22.

He died at Calverton, Nottinghamshire on 28 March 1923. His brother Amos also played first-class cricket.
