= Henry Shaw (cricketer) =

English cricketer

Personal information
- Born: 21 May 1854; Mansfield, Nottinghamshire, England
- Died: 8 November 1932 (aged 78); Derby, England
- Batting: Right-handed
- Bowling: Right-arm medium

Domestic team information
- Years: Team
- 1875–1884: Derbyshire
- FC debut: 19 July 1875 Derbyshire v Kent
- Last FC: 4 August 1884 Derbyshire v Lancashire

Career statistics
Competition	First-class
Matches	14
Runs scored	121
Batting average	6.72
100s/50s	0/0
Top score	22
Balls bowled	288
Wickets	10
Bowling average	15.80
5 wickets in innings	1
10 wickets in match	0
Best bowling	5/34
Catches/stumpings	5/–
- Source: CricketArchive, 28 December 2010

Henry Shaw (21 May 1854 – 8 November 1932) was an English cricketer who played for Derbyshire between 1875 and 1884.

Shaw was born in Mansfield, Nottinghamshire and worked as a painter on the Midland Railway. He was also cricket coach at Derby School. He played a non-qualifying match for Derbyshire in 1874 and made his first-class debut in the 1875 season against Kent, a win for Derbyshire in which he made his top score of 22. He played two matches in the 1876 season and one in the 1877 season. He played three matches in the 1878 season and umpired two first-class matches for Derbyshire. In the 1879 season he umpired one first-class match and played two non-status games. In the 1880 season he played three first-class matches and achieved his best bowling performance of 5 for 34 against Sussex. He also played three matches in the 1881 season. At the time of the 1881 census he was running the New Inn public house in Stapenhill.

After a break, he played one further match for Derbyshire in the 1884 season when he bowled 4 for 26 against Lancashire. In 1887 he started playing for Staffordshire for whom he appeared regularly until 1892. His name also appears in a match for Lincolnshire in 1890. He umpired four minor county matches in 1901 and in 1902 he umpired a season of first-class matches. Later he umpired one match in 1908 and another in 1919.

Shaw was a right-handed batsman and played 25 innings in 14 first-class matches with an average of 6.72 and a top score of 22. He was a right-arm roundarm medium pace bowler and took 10 first-class wickets and an average of 15.8 and a best performance of 5 for 34.

Shaw died in Derby at the age of 78.
