= John Cooke (Derbyshire cricketer) =

English cricketer

Personal information
- Born: 7 March 1851; Wirksworth, Derbyshire, England
- Died: 22 November 1908 (aged 57); Wirksworth, Derbyshire. England
- Batting: Right-handed
- Role: Wicket-keeper

Domestic team information
- Years: Team
- 1874: Derbyshire
- Only First-class: 13 July 1874 Derbyshire v Kent

Career statistics
Competition	First-class
Matches	1
Runs scored	6
Batting average	3.00
100s/50s	0/0
Top score	6
Catches/stumpings	0/0
- Source: CricketArchive, 21 December 2010

John Cooke (7 March 1851 – 22 November 1908) was an English cricketer who played for Derbyshire in 1874.

Cooke was born at Wirksworth and played cricket for Grimsby in 1873. He played one first-class game for Derbyshire in the 1874 season in which he kept wicket in a victory against Kent. He was out for a duck in the first innings of the game, and scored six in the second. In the same season, he played in a non-first-class match for Derbyshire against Nottinghamshire when he kept wicket in the second innings and stumped two batsmen. He also played for Grimsby again in 1874. In 1878 he appeared for Birmingham.

Cooke died in Wirksworth at the age of 57.
