= Robert Smith (Derbyshire cricketer) =

English cricketer

Personal information
- Full name: Robert Posnett Smith
- Born: 1 November 1848; Sawley, Derbyshire, England
- Died: 1 May 1899 (aged 50); Staunton Grange, Notts, England
- Batting: Right-handed
- Bowling: Right-arm slow
- Role: Batsman

Domestic team information
- Years: Team
- 1871–1884: Derbyshire
- FC debut: 26 May 1871 Derbyshire v Lancashire
- Last FC: 23 June 1884 Derbyshire v Yorkshire

Career statistics
Competition	First-class
Matches	103
Runs scored	2,718
Batting average	14.54
100s/50s	0/7
Top score	87
Balls bowled	44
Wickets	0
Bowling average	–
5 wickets in innings	–
10 wickets in match	–
Best bowling	–
Catches/stumpings	74/–
- Source: CricketArchive, 31 January 2010

Robert Posnett Smith (1 November 1848 – 1 May 1899), later known as Robert Posnett Stevens, was an English cricketer who played first-class cricket for Derbyshire between 1871 and 1884 and was captain of the side from 1876 to 1883. He was a member of the team that played Derbyshire's first match in May 1871.

Smith was born in Sawley, the son of John Smith a farmer and his wife Ruth. He was educated at Castle Donington School in Leicestershire and continued farming at Sawley.

Smith took part in the very first fixture played by Derbyshire as a county team in the 1871 season, against a Lancashire side who posted the lowest total against Derbyshire in the history of first-class cricket. He played in both matches between Derbyshire and Lancashire in the 1872 and 1873 seasons. In the 1874 season, with Kent taking on Derbyshire Smith played in all four matches none of which was lost. Also in 1874, he appeared for the United North of England team in a first-class match against the South. His team included early leading lights of cricket such as Tom Emmett, former Yorkshire captain Ephraim Lockwood, and uncle-and-nephew pairing Andrew (a two-time Test player) and Yorkshire captain Luke Greenwood. The South of England had at their disposal early soon-to-become Test greats such as James Lillywhite jnr., Harry Jupp, and Dr. William Gilbert Grace, a combination of early Test cricketers who served to overpower their less experienced opponents. A return match saw a three-day draw, though it came complete with a nine-wicket haul for Grace.

Smith played seven matches for Derbyshire in the 1875 season and was appointed captain of Derbyshire for the 1876 season when the club won three and lost four. Also in 1876 he played for an England team as innings victors against the United South of England.

In the 1877 season Smith's batting average was up to the twenties and his Derbyshire side won five matches to three losses. In the 1878 season Smith was top scorer for Derbyshire with 390 runs and played again for a losing North side against South Derbyshire lost more of their matches in this season. The 1879 season was also less successful for the club and Smith's average fell to single figures. In the 1880 Derbyshire faced the touring Australian, captained by Harry Boyle. The highly experienced Australian team, consisting entirely of contemporary Test players, won with an innings to spare. Also in 1880 Smith opened for the Gentlemen against the Players, along with George Barrington, just three weeks after an innings victory over a Canadian representative team, which included Thomas Phillips and Walter Gilbert. Smith carried on captaining the Derbyshire team in the 1881, 1882 and 1883 seasons playing more matches but seeing fewer wins. He handed over captaincy to Ludford Docker for the 1884 season in which he played his last six matches.

Smith was a right-handed batsman and played 190 innings in 103 first-class matches with an average of 14.54 and a top score of 87. Smith was a slow right-arm underarm bowler but took no wickets in around eight overs.

Smith continued as a farmer of 50 acres (200,000 m^{2}) with one employee, living with his wife Sarah, a brother, John, eight years his junior, and a domestic servant. In 1885 he changed his name to Robert Posnett Stevens and in 1891 was Lord of the Manor of Breaston. He died at Staunton Grange, Nottinghamshire at the age of 50.

Sporting positions
Preceded by Samuel Richardson	Derbyshire cricket captains 1876–1883	Succeeded by Ludford Docker
