= William Curgenven =

English cricketer and surgeon

Personal information
- Full name: William Grafton Curgenven
- Born: 30 November 1841; Plymouth, England
- Died: 18 March 1910 (aged 68); Fareham, Hampshire, England
- Batting: Right-handed
- Relatives: Henry Curgenven (son); Gilbert Curgenven (son)

Domestic team information
- Years: Team
- 1872–1878: Derbyshire
- FC debut: 9 August 1872 Derbyshire v Lancashire
- Last FC: 19 August 1878 Derbyshire v Nottinghamshire

Career statistics
Competition	First-class
Matches	17
Runs scored	376
Batting average	12.53
100s/50s	0/1
Top score	71
Catches/stumpings	5/–
- Source: CricketArchive, 16 August 2010

William Grafton Curgenven (30 November 1841 – 18 March 1910) was an English surgeon and cricketer who played first-class cricket for Derbyshire between 1872 and 1878.

== Biography and career ==
Curgenven was born in Plymouth and became a doctor and was MRCS. In the 1860s he was playing club cricket and for the Gentlement of Devon. He made two appearances in miscellaneous matches as early as 1864, when he played for South Wales Cricket Club against I Zingari, playing amongst W. G. Grace and his brother Edward, and, the following year, for Gentlemen of Devon.

Curgenven was one of the parties to the foundation of Derbyshire County Cricket Club in 1870. He made his first appearance for Derbyshire in the 1872 season against Lancashire. In the 1873 season he was top scorer in a lean season for Derbyshire with 39. He played one match against Kent in the 1874 season. In the 1875 season he played three matches making his top score of 71 against Kent. He played four matches during the 1876 season, though in each of his four appearances, he was dismissed for single-figure scores. He did not play in 1877 but returned in the 1878 season, playing five county matches, as well as a game against an All England Eleven, featuring players such as Test cricketers Dick Barlow, Arthur Shrewsbury, Billy Barnes, Alfred Shaw, Wilfred Flowers and William Scotton.

Curgenven was a right-handed batsman and played 30 innings in 17 matches with an average of 12.53 and a top score of 71. He was described as " A brilliant bat, hitting well all round, and on a lively wicket a fast run-getter; a good field at long leg and cover-point."

Curgenven died at Fareham, Hampshire at the age of 68. His home on Friar Gate, Derby is now Pickford's House Museum.

Curgenven married Pamela Barrett Harman on 20 January 1874 in St Matthew's, Ardwick, Manchester. They had two sons Henry and Gilbert, who also played first-class cricket for Derbyshire and two daughters.
