= William Jervis (cricketer, born 1827) =

English lawyer and cricketer

Personal information
- Full name: William Monk Jervis
- Born: 25 January 1827; Marylebone, London
- Died: 25 March 1909 (aged 82); Quarndon Hall, Derbyshire
- Batting: Right-handed

Domestic team information
- Years: Team
- 1848: Oxford University
- 1850–1852: MCC
- 1873: Derbyshire
- FC debut: 6 July 1848 Oxford University v MCC
- Last FC: 21 July 1873 Derbyshire v Lancashire

Career statistics
Competition	First-class
Matches	5
Runs scored	34
Batting average	6.80
100s/50s	0/0
Top score	17
Catches/stumpings	3/–
- Source: CricketArchive, 17 December 2010

William Monk Jervis (25 January 1827 – 25 March 1909) was an English lawyer and cricketer who played for Oxford University, Marylebone Cricket Club and Derbyshire.

Jervis was born at St Marylebone, second son of William Jervis Jervis, and grandson of the 2nd Viscount St Vincent. He was educated at Eton and Trinity College, Oxford. He played cricket for Oxford University in 1848 and played a minor game for Stoneleigh in 1849. He played for MCC in 1850 when he never had a chance to bat, and in 1852 when he made his top score of 17. Also in 1852 he showed up for Hereford against an All England XI.

In 1853 Jervis was admitted to the Inner Temple as a barrister-at-law and in 1859 played for the Gentlemen of England. Later, he had a legal practice at Derby and was playing against All England XIs for Staveley in 1867 and 1869 and for Chesterfield. By 1871 he was living at The Elms, Duffield Road, Derby. He helped to establish the Derbyshire County C.C. and was its president from 1871 until 1887. He played just one match for Derbyshire in the 1873 season in which he scored 0 and 6 in a defeat by Lancashire. He was a right-handed batsman and played 8 innings in 5 first-class matches with a top score of 17 and an average of 6.80.

Jervis died at Quarndon Hall, Derbyshire, at the age of 82.

In 1864 William Jervis married Harriet Wilmot Sitwell, daughter of Robert Sacheverel Sitwell of Derby. She died in 1875 and he remarried a year later, to his cousin Mary Maude Parker Jervis. He was widowed again within three years, and in 1882 he married Mary Stepney, the widow of a captain in the Derby Militia. Although married three times, he had no children.

Jervis was the uncle of Lord Harris, an English cricketer born in Trinidad who played four Tests for the English cricket team.
