= John Burnham (cricketer) =

English cricketer

Personal information
- Full name: John William Burnham
- Born: 6 June 1839; Nottingham, England
- Died: 20 April 1914 (aged 74); Derby, England
- Batting: Right-handed

Domestic team information
- Years: Team
- 1871–1876: Derbyshire
- FC debut: 26 May 1871 Derbyshire v Lancashire
- Last FC: 20 July 1876 Derbyshire v Kent

Career statistics
| Competition | First-class |
|---|---|
| Matches | 6 |
| Runs scored | 55 |
| Batting average | 5.00 |
| 100s/50s | 0/0 |
| Top score | 31 |
| Catches/stumpings | 2/– |
- Source: CricketArchive, 14 December 2010

John William Burnham (6 June 1839 – 20 April 1914) was an English cricketer who played for Derbyshire between 1871 and 1876. He was a member of the team that played Derbyshire's first match in May 1871.

Burnham was born at Nottingham, the son of William Burnham, a joiner and his wife Catherine. He became a clerk and in 1863 he was playing for Suffolk and in one match for an All England XI. In 1870 he played several club games for Burnley. He joined Derbyshire in the 1871 season and took part in Derbyshire's first-ever match as a county side, an innings victory over Lancashire. He played the return game later in the season, and played again for Derbyshire in the 1872 season in both fixtures between Derbyshire and Lancashire. Also in 1872 he played some games for Prince's Club in London. In the 1873 season he only played one match for Derbyshire against Lancashire. He did not play again until the 1876 season when his final match, as a first-class player, was against Kent, in which he was bowled out by Test cricketer Charlie Absolom.

Burnham was a right-handed batsman and played eleven innings in six first-class matches with an average of 5.00 and a top score of 31. In 1881 he was living at Litchurch. Burnham umpired one game during the 1879 season, three years after giving up the first-class game.

Burnham died at Derby.
