= William Hickton (cricketer, born 1842) =

English cricketer

Personal information
- Full name: William Hickton
- Born: 14 December 1842; Hardstoft, Derbyshire, England
- Died: 27 March 1900 (aged 57); Broughton, Salford, Lancashire, England
- Batting: Right-handed
- Bowling: Right-arm fast
- Relatives: William Hickton (son)

Domestic team information
- Years: Team
- 1867–1871: Lancashire
- 1871–1878: Derbyshire
- FC debut: 30 May 1867 Lancashire v Surrey
- Last FC: 19 August 1878 Derbyshire v Nottinghamshire

Career statistics
Competition	First-class
Matches	60
Runs scored	1,054
Batting average	12.25
100s/50s	0/2
Top score	63
Balls bowled	10,958
Wickets	284
Bowling average	14.15
5 wickets in innings	24
10 wickets in match	7
Best bowling	10/46
Catches/stumpings	32/–
- Source: CricketArchive, 2 May 2010

William Hickton (14 December 1842 – 27 March 1900) was an English cricketer who played for Lancashire between 1867 and 1871 and for Derbyshire between 1871 and 1878. He was a member of the team that played Derbyshire's first match in May 1871.

Hickton was born in Hardstoft, Derbyshire. He first played for the Salford-based Broughton club in 1867 and began his first-class career for Lancashire in the same year. In a match against MCC at Lords, which was so badly interrupted by the weather, that mops and pails were used clear water off the pitch, Hickton took 5 for 69 and 6 for 22. He continued to play in county matches between Lancashire and the small number of registered county sides at the time. In his time as a bowler at Lancashire, he took 144 wickets for 2022 runs, and in 1870 he achieved a clean sweep of 10–46 in a match against Hampshire.

In 1871 Hickton decided to move to Derbyshire and join the newly established Derbyshire County Cricket Club in their opening season in a bowling line-up that included Dove Gregory and John Platts. Hickton's first match for Derbyshire, the first County Match played by the team, was against his old team Lancashire. Hickton made a good account of himself, taking four wickets in the first innings of the match. Hickton played in both matches against Lancashire in the 1872 season, whereas a good score in his one match against lancashire in the 1873 season put him top of the batting averages. In the 1874 season he played only two matches but took 17 wickets with 6–15 against Kent and 6–63 against Lancashire. In the 1875 season, he played six of the seven matches and took 32 wickets with 5–38 against United North of England. In the 1876 season he played four of seven matches but took eleven wickets of his twenty-two wickets in one match against Kent with 5-52 and 6-41. He played in all matches with the team in the 1877 season, when he took 40 wickets with 5–37 against Lancashire, 6–47 against Kent and 5–44 against Hampshire. As with earlier seasons, Hickton was kept of the top bowler spot by William Mycroft. Hickton managed just eleven wickets in eleven matches in the 1878 season and retired from first-class cricket. He continued his association with Broughton until 1897. Hickton's benefit match took place on 20 July 1883 between Lancashire and eighteen of the Broughton Club.

Hickton was a right-arm round-arm fast bowler and took 284 first-class wickets at an average of 14.15 and a best performance of 10–46. He was a lower-order right-handed batsman and played 103 innings in 60 matches with a top score of 63 and an average of 12.25. He was also a deft slip fielder.

Hickton died at Lower Broughton, Salford, at the age of 58. Wisden described him as "a good batsman and a fast round-armed bowler, being altogether a cricketer above the average, and fielding generally at slip." A reporter was once noted to have said of Hickton, "There were few better fast bowlers than Hickton, and he always looked a very proud man when he could get through the defence of the Champion and then walk off the field in a stately fashion for a drink."

Hickton's son, also named William Hickton, played first-class cricket for Worcestershire.
