= John Tye (cricketer) =

English cricketer

Personal information
- Born: 10 July 1848; Bulwell, Nottinghamshire, England
- Died: 19 November 1905 (aged 57); Rastrick, Yorkshire, England
- Batting: Right-handed
- Bowling: Right-arm fast

Domestic team information
- Years: Team
- 1874–1875: Derbyshire
- 1876–1881: Nottinghamshire
- FC debut: 5 June 1874 Derbyshire v Lancashire
- Last FC: 4 August 1881 Nottinghamshire v Gloucestershire

Career statistics
Competition	First-class
Matches	24
Runs scored	226
Batting average	7.53
100s/50s	0/0
Top score	48
Balls bowled	2241
Wickets	45
Bowling average	24.48
5 wickets in innings	2
10 wickets in match	0
Best bowling	5/41
Catches/stumpings	20/–
- Source: CricketArchive, 20 December 2010

John Tye (10 July 1848 – 19 November 1905) was an English cricketer who played for Derbyshire in 1874 and 1875 and for Nottinghamshire from 1876 to 1881.

Tye was born in Bulwell, Nottinghamshire and became a blacksmith. In 1872 he was playing for Chesterfield Cricket Club. He began his county cricket career with Derbyshire in the 1874 season. He made his first-class debut in June when he took a wicket in his first match, a win against Lancashire. Although his wicket cost of only four runs, Tye had little further bowling opportunity in the Derbyshire side where there was a wealth of bowlers. He played the return match against Lancashire and a match against Kent. In 1874 he also played in an assortment of matches for Derbyshire against Nottinghamshire, Yorkshire United and United South of England. In the 1875 season he only played one match which was against the United North of England Eleven.

In 1876 Tye moved to his home county of Nottinghamshire where he played 17 matches. He achieved his best bowling performance of 5 for 41 against Middlesex in his first match in 1876, followed by 5 for 49 against Lancashire. Tye was a tailend batsman during his time at Nottinghamshire. He achieved his best score of 48 against Gloucestershire in 1876 where Nottinghamshire suffered the combined onslaught of the three Grace brothers. In 1877 he was unable to match these figures and ended playing just one match in 1878 and two in 1881.

Tye was a right-arm roundarm fast bowler and took 45 first-class wickets at an average of 24.49 and a best performance of 5 for 41. He was a right-handed batsman and played 38 innings in 24 matches with an average of 7.53 and a top score of 48.

By 1880 Tye moved to Brighouse, where he was a publican at the Round House Inn. He played cricket for Brighouse cricket club and is noted as taking 10 wickets in a match in 1881. For the club from 1880 to 1897 he scored over 5,000 runs and took 823 wickets of which 627 were clean bowled.

Tye died in Rastrick, Yorkshire at the age of 57.
