= John Galpin =

English cricketer (1843–1917)

Personal information
- Full name: John George Galpin
- Born: 13 January 1843; Alverstoke, Hampshire, England
- Died: 5 March 1917 (aged 74); Luton, Bedfordshire, England
- Height: 5 ft 8 in (1.73 m)
- Batting: Right-handed
- Bowling: Right-arm roundarm fast

Domestic team information
- Years: Team
- 1875–1880: Hampshire

Career statistics
Competition	First-class
Matches	7
Runs scored	100
Batting average	11.11
100s/50s	–/–
Top score	27
Balls bowled	1,352
Wickets	28
Bowling average	16.50
5 wickets in innings	2
10 wickets in match	–
Best bowling	6/68
Catches/stumpings	4/–
- Source: Cricinfo, 15 February 2010

John George Galpin (13 January 1843 – 5 March 1917) was an English professional first-class cricketer.

Galpin was born at Alverstoke in Gosport in January 1843. Described by Haygarth as a "good round-armed bowler and an average batsman", Galpin was engaged as a professional at Exeter College, Oxford in the summers of 1865–1866, 1868 and 1870. In 1867, he was the professional at Gravesend with the Gravesend and Milton Club, and was subsequently engaged by the Buckingham Club from 1868 to 1871, following the conclusion of the cricketing season at Oxford. In 1871 and 1872, he was employed by Uppingham School as their cricket coach, before playing for Birkenhead Cricket Club as their professional from 1873 to 1875. It was in 1875, that Galpin made his debut in first-class cricket for Hampshire against Kent at Catford. He played first-class cricket for Hampshire until 1880, making seven appearances. In these, he took 28 wickets at an average of 16.50; he took two five wicket hauls, with best figures of 6 for 68 (from 68.3 overs) against Kent in his third match of 1875. With the bat, he scored 100 runs with a highest score of 27. Outside of cricket, he was by trade a rope maker. Galpin died at Luton in March 1917.
