= Unwin Sowter =

English cricketer, corn factor and miller

Personal information
- Born: 22 April 1839; Derby, England
- Died: 14 April 1910 (aged 70); Derby, England
- Batting: Right-handed

Domestic team information
- Years: Team
- 1871–1876: Derbyshire
- FC debut: 26 May 1871 Derbyshire v Lancashire
- Last FC: 5 June 1876 Derbyshire v Hampshire

Career statistics
Competition	First-class
Matches	7
Runs scored	128
Batting average	12.80
100s/50s	0/0
Top score	47*
Catches/stumpings	7/–
- Source: CricketArchive, 10 August 2010

Unwin Sowter (22 April 1839 – 14 April 1910) was an English corn factor and miller and cricketer who played for Derbyshire between 1871 and 1876. He was a member of the team that played Derbyshire's first match in May 1871.

Sowter was born at Derby, the son of William Sowter and his wife Hannah Unwin. His father had a bakery business which he developed into corn factoring and malting. Sowton attended Derby School and joined the family business with his brothers.

Sowter was one of the pioneers of cricket in Derby and around. He played against the All England Eleven as part of a Derby Town and South Derbyshire side in 1857 and 1859. The latter team included Lord Stanhope, Lord Paget, the Bodens, and Dove Gregory, and there was "considerable attendance of spectators, among whom were most of the neighbouring gentry and their families, and gay throngs of ladies". In 1865 Sowter played for a Burton on Trent side.

Sowter took part in Derbyshire's very first match played as a County Cricket team against Lancashire on 26 and 27 May 1871 at Old Trafford, Manchester. A victory for Derbyshire was down to a record low score by the Lancashire side. He played in both Derbyshire matches in the 1871 season and was top scorer for the season. He played one match in the 1872 season and one in the 1873 season. He played two matches in the 1875 season and his last match in the 1876 season. He took part in various other matches over these years.

Sowter was a right-handed batsman and played 11 innings in 7 first-class games with an average of 12.8 and a top score of 47 not out.

Sowter was still playing in occasional games in 1879, and for many years afterwards was a vice-president of the club and a member of the committee.

He was well known as the proprietor of the Sowter Brothers flour mill next to the Silk Mill in Derby. He was also a director of the brewers Z Smith & Company. In public life he served as an alderman of Derby and was Mayor of Derby in 1879–80. He was also a J. P.

Sowter died in Derby at the age of 70.
