= Charles Regan =

English cricketer

Personal information
- Born: 11 May 1842; Barnsley, Yorkshire
- Died: 17 May 1921 (aged 79); Southend-on-Sea, Essex
- Batting: Right-handed

Domestic team information
- Years: Team
- 1877: Derbyshire
- FC debut: 21 May 1877 Derbyshire v Lancashire
- Last FC: 18 June 1877 Derbyshire v Kent

Career statistics
Competition	First-class
Matches	5
Runs scored	90
Batting average	9.00
100s/50s	0/0
Top score	22
Catches/stumpings	1/–
- Source: CricketArchive, 20 January 2011

Charles Regan (11 May 1842 – 17 May 1921) was an English cricketer who played for Derbyshire in 1877.

Regan was born in Barnsley and became a brewer's traveller. Between 1873 and 1881 he was living variously in Romford, Essex, Barnsley and Croydon, Surrey.

Regan made his debut for Derbyshire in the 1877 season in May against Lancashire when he made his top score of 22. He played in the next four matches for the county until the middle of June. He batted in the upper-middle order throughout his short spell at the club.

Regan was a right-handed batsman who played 10 innings in 5 first-class matches with an average of 9.00 and a top score of 22. In 1884, he appeared for Essex against Surrey in a match without status.

Regan died in Southend-on-Sea at the age of 79.
