= George Frost (cricketer) =

English cricketer (1848–1913)

Personal information
- Full name: George Frost
- Born: 16 October 1848; Wirksworth, England
- Died: 12 February 1913 (aged 64); Wirksworth, England
- Batting: Right-handed
- Relatives: John Frost (brother)

Domestic team information
- Years: Team
- 1872–1880: Derbyshire
- FC debut: 9 August 1872 Derbyshire v Lancashire
- Last FC: 21 June 1880 Derbyshire v Sussex

Career statistics
Competition	First-class
Matches	37
Runs scored	771
Batting average	12.23
100s/50s	0/1
Top score	52
Catches/stumpings	10/–
- Source: CricketArchive, 10 August 2010

George Frost (16 October 1848 – 12 February 1913) was an English cricketer who played first-class cricket for Derbyshire between 1872 and 1880.

Frost was born in Wirksworth, the son of George Frost, a farmer/builder, and his wife Mary. He became a joiner and played cricket for Wirksworth - taking part in matches against All England XI in 1866, 1868 and 1870

Frost played his first match for Derbyshire in the 1872 season, against Lancashire which Derbyshire lost. This was also the second game for Joseph Flint who had played together with the Frosts at Wirksworth Cricket Club. Frost next played for Derbyshire in the 1874 season. In a win against Kent, he played alongside his brother John Frost who was making his single Derbyshire appearance, for a 41-run second-wicket partnership. Frost was top scorer for Derbyshire in 1874 in a season of three out of four wins. He played regularly in the 1875 season. Frost scored one half-century for the Derbyshire team, against Hampshire in the 1876 season. He played for two further seasons in 1877 and 1878 season and then in five games in the 1880 season. Frost was a right-handed batsman and played 67 innings in 37 first-class games, with a top score of 52 and an average of 12.23.

Frost died in Wirksworth at the age of 64.

Frost's brother John, 21 months his senior, played one first-class match for Derbyshire.
