= Alfort Smith =

English cricketer

Personal information
- Full name: Alfort Smith
- Born: 7 July 1846; Bury, Lancashire, England
- Died: 21 December 1908 (aged 62); Glossop, Derbyshire, England
- Batting: Right-handed
- Role: Wicket=keeper

Domestic team information
- Years: Team
- 1867–1871: Lancashire
- 1873–1880: Derbyshire
- FC debut: 2 September 1867 Lancashire v Yorkshire
- Last FC: 6 September 1880 North v United South of England Eleven

Career statistics
Competition	First-class
Matches	55
Runs scored	305
Batting average	4.76
100s/50s	0/0
Top score	30
Balls bowled	16
Wickets	0
Bowling average	–
5 wickets in innings	–
10 wickets in match	–
Best bowling	–
Catches/stumpings	70/12
- Source: CricketArchive, 2 May 2010

Alfort Smith (7 July 1846 – 21 December 1908) was an English cricketer who kept wicket for Lancashire in 1867 and 1871 and for Derbyshire between 1873 and 1880.

== Life ==
Smith was born in Bank Lane, near Bury Lancashire, but his parents moved to Glossop shortly after his birth. He became a cotton weaver, and started playing for Glossop cricket club in 1863 at the age of 16. He was a respected batsman and wicket-keeper at the club. He made his debut for Lancashire in 1867 against Yorkshire when he scored 2 and was not out for zero and held three catches behind the stumps. However, he did not play again until the 1871 season when he played against Derbyshire in their first outing. Smith was top scorer at 11 not out in Lancashire's record low innings score of 25, but his two catches and two stumpings were not enough to stave off defeat. He played two more matches for Lancashire and umpired one match.

After a year out of the game, Smith transferred his allegiance to Derbyshire and played one match in the 1873 season which was a return match against his old side of Lancashire. In the 1875 season Smith became Derbyshire's regular wicket-keeper, and playing with bowlers such as William Mycroft, George Hay and William Hickton became reliable enough for the club to dispense with the services of George Frost as long-stop. He played regularly every year until 1880.

Smith was a right-handed batsman and played 98 innings in 55 first-class matches at an average of 4.76 and a top score of 30. As wicket-keeper, he took 70 catches and stumped 12 times. He also bowled 16 balls without a wicket.

In 1881 Smith was living with his family as a cotton weaver at Fitzallan Street Glossop Dale. He maintained his links with the game, umpiring several matches each year until 1901. He was given the Lancashire v Yorkshire match in August 1893 and after Yorkshire had been defeated by 5 runs, they complained because he had been born in Lancashire.

Smith died at Glossop at the age of 62.
