= Dove Gregory =

English cricketer (1837–1873)

Personal information
- Full name: Gregory Dove
- Born: 9 February 1837; Sutton-in-Ashfield, Nottinghamshire, England
- Died: 21 May 1873 (aged 36); Derby, England
- Batting: Right-handed
- Bowling: Right-arm fast

Domestic team information
- Years: Team
- 1871–1872: Derbyshire
- FC debut: 26 May 1871 Derbyshire v Lancashire
- Last FC: 9 August 1872 Derbyshire v Lancashire

Career statistics
Competition	First-class
Matches	4
Runs scored	19
Batting average	4.75
100s/50s	0/0
Top score	10
Balls bowled	662
Wickets	25
Bowling average	10.20
5 wickets in innings	3
10 wickets in match	0
Best bowling	6/9
Catches/stumpings	3/–
- Source: CricketArchive, 26 July 2010

Dove Gregory (real name Gregory Dove; 9 February 1837 – 21 May 1873) was an English first-class cricketer who played for Derbyshire in 1871 and 1872. He was a member of the team that played Derbyshire's first match in May 1871 and his early death in 1873 robbed the side of an outstanding bowler.

Dove was born in Sutton-in-Ashfield, Nottinghamshire. In 1858 he appeared in a pre-club match for Derbyshire against an All England Eleven, appearing again in 1859 and 1861. The 1859 team included Lord Stanhope, Lord Paget, the Bodens, and Unwin Sowter, and there was "considerable attendance of spectators, among whom were most of the neighbouring gentry and their families, and gay throngs of ladies". He played against All England again in 1867 and 1869 for Sutton-in-Ashfield, in 1870 for Wirksworth and in 1871 for Mansfield Woodhouse. In the Wirksworth match he took 15 wickets.

After Derbyshire County Cricket Club was founded in 1870, Dove played in the first match in the 1871 season against Lancashire when he took 6 wickets for 9 runs in their first innings. In the return match later in the year he took 5 for 57 against Lancashire. He played in two matches in the 1872 season which were both against Lancashire. He took 5 for 70 in the first match.

Dove was a right-arm round arm fast bowler and took 25 wickets in his four first-class matches, with an average of 10.20. As a right-handed batsman he played 7 innings in the four matches with a top score of 10 and an average of 4.75.

Gregory died at the age of 36 at the start of the 1873 season.
