= Alec Watson (cricketer) =

Scottish first-class cricketer

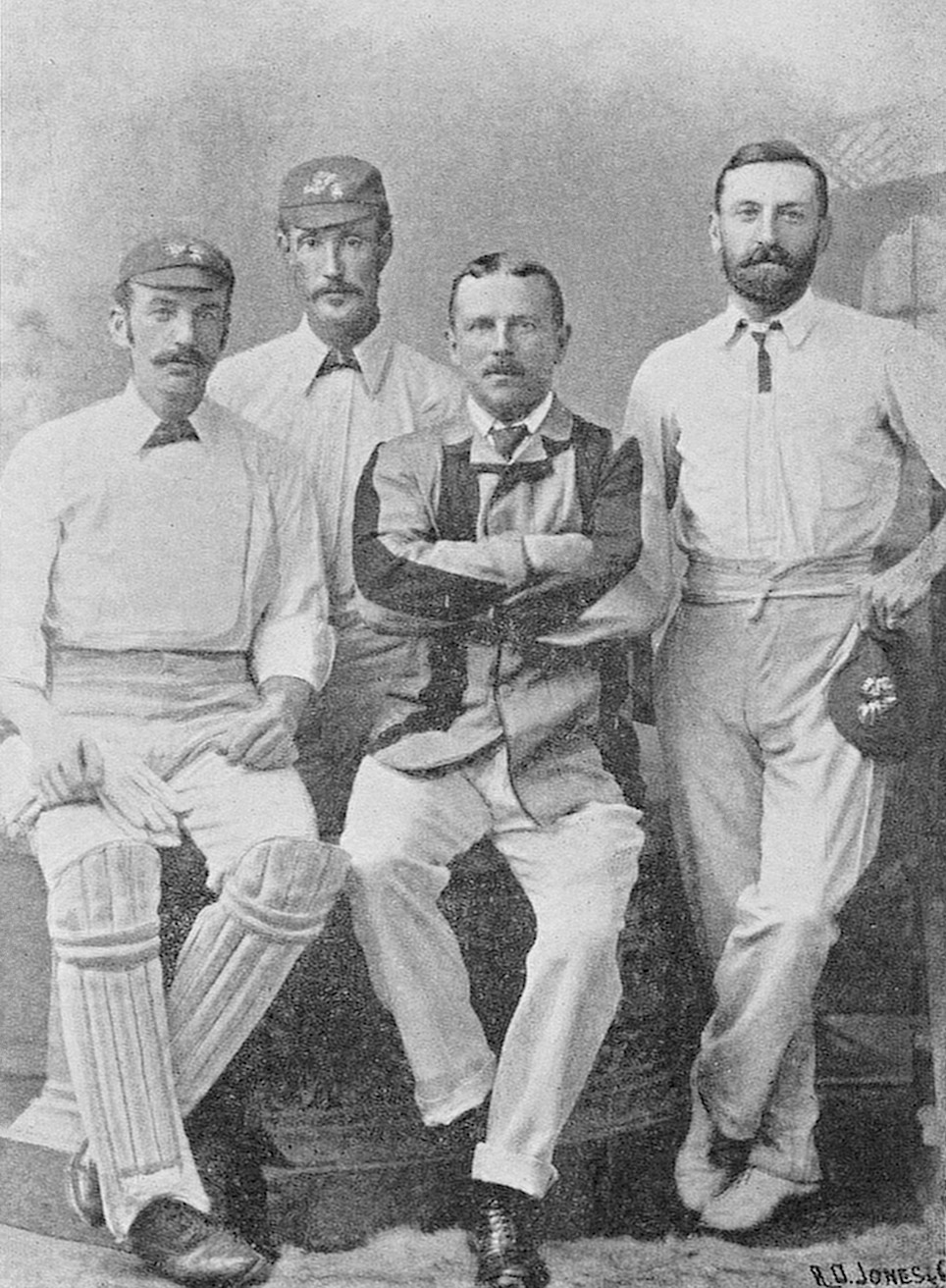
- Alec Watson (second left) with: (l-r); Dick Pilling, A. N. Hornby and Dick Barlow

Personal information
- Full name: Alexander Watson
- Born: 4 November 1844; Coatbridge, Lanarkshire, Scotland
- Died: 26 October 1920 (aged 75); Manchester, England
- Batting: Right-handed
- Bowling: Right-arm slow; Right-arm fast

Career statistics
Competition	First-class
Matches	303
Runs scored	4,492
Batting average	12.58
100s/50s	0/4
Top score	74
Balls bowled	65,887
Wickets	1,384
Bowling average	13.31
5 wickets in innings	106
10 wickets in match	27
Best bowling	9/118
Catches/stumpings	276/1
- Source: CricketArchive, 9 May 2022

Alexander Watson (4 November 1844 – 26 October 1920) was a Scottish first-class cricketer who played for Lancashire County Cricket Club. He was one Lancashire's first long-serving professionals, and in his prime formed part of a strong bowling attack with A. G. Steel, Dick Barlow and John Crossland that lifted Lancashire to success in the 1881 and 1882 seasons when they won 22 and lost only one of 29 inter-county matches.

== Career ==
Watson learned his cricket in his native Scotland for the Drumpelier and Edinburgh Clubs as a fast bowler, but attracted no attention until he moved to Rusholme in 1869 where he was discovered by Lancashire as a slow bowler in the contemporary round-arm style; however, Watson had an unusually deceptive flight for his time and could vary his stock off-break with a ball that turned the other way to great effect. Moreover, Watson was an exceptionally accurate bowler and his short stature and consequent low trajectory meant he was impossible for contemporary batsmen to jump out to and hit. He played for the first time in 1871 but did not bowl; however in the following season he became a regular member of a county team that played only four matches but won them all using merely three bowlers: Watson, Arthur Appleby and William McIntyre!

In the following four years, Watson established himself very close to the top of the first-class bowling averages until he ceased being a regular member of the Lancashire eleven. He took nine for 118 against Derbyshire in 1874; amazingly despite taking seven wickets in an innings sixteen times he never took eight or more again. In 1877, owing to the absence of Alfred Shaw and the decline of fifty-year-old Southerton, Watson was for the first time called upon for representative cricket, playing for "England" against the Marylebone Cricket Club and taking on a sticky wicket his best-ever match return of fourteen wickets for forty-nine runs; however, "England" were dismissed by Fred Morley and William Mycroft for 26 and lost the match. Watson also played for the Players in a thrilling game against the Gentlemen – taking five wickets for 60 runs – but the following season the return of Shaw and the emergence of Lancashire teammate Steel meant he had no chance of distinguishing himself in representative matches except late in the season against the Australians, where he failed to take a wicket on a very helpful pitch even for the time.

The widespread belief that Watson's delivery was unfair, and that he used his jerky action to flight the ball into strong breezes further prejudiced his chances of becoming a representative cricketer with stiff competition from Shaw and Peate, but from 1879 until 1887 Watson was a vital cog in a Lancashire team that in 1881 so dominated its opponents that they averaged less than eleven runs per wicket whilst the Lancastrians scored over 23 and were unofficially recognised as "Champion County" for the first time. Watson was fifth in the national averages in 1880, fourth in 1881 and for the first time in his career at the top in 1883 despite the driest summer since the heavy roller was first widely used.

After two moderate years, Watson at forty-one returned to the top of the national average in 1886 with an amazing start that yielded 28 wickets for 143 runs in his first three games, whilst in the extremely dry season of 1887 he bowled with superb accuracy to be difficult even on pitches more favourable to batting than ever known in England before. His 100 wickets that summer constituted Watson's largest single-season aggregate, but in the very wet season of 1888 he faltered badly, taking on sixty-nine wickets for a modest average in the circumstances.

The arrival of controversial speedster Arthur Mold complemented Watson and Briggs to form a very powerful three-pronged attack in the following two years, but in 1891 injury took its toll on Watson's ageing body and he took only twenty-nine wickets. In 1892 it was thought Watson at forty-seven "had not lost his cunning", but early in the 1893 he was dropped after taking only one wicket in three games. Watson did play once more for Lancashire in 1895 and was when Briggs lost form and Mold strained himself asked to play again at the unparalleled age of fifty-four late in 1898, but he declined. Nonetheless, Watson did play one match at the age of fifty-nine in 1904 for Buckinghamshire, for whom his former teammate and equally controversial slow bowler George Nash had played in the six years before his death.
