= William Mycroft =

English cricketer (1841–1894)

Personal information
- Born: 1 February 1841; Brimington, Derbyshire, England
- Died: 19 June 1894 (aged 53); Derby, England
- Batting: Right-handed
- Bowling: Left-arm fast
- Relatives: Thomas Mycroft (brother)

Domestic team information
- Years: Team
- 1873–1885: Derbyshire
- 1876–1886: MCC
- FC debut: 21 July 1873 Derbyshire v Lancashire
- Last FC: 31 May 1886 MCC v Cambridge University

Career statistics
Competition	First-class
Matches	138
Runs scored	791
Batting average	5.34
100s/50s	0/0
Top score	44*
Balls bowled	31,823
Wickets	863
Bowling average	12.09
5 wickets in innings	87
10 wickets in match	28
Best bowling	9/25
Catches/stumpings	94/–
- Source: CricketArchive, 2 May 2010

William Mycroft (1 February 1841 – 19 June 1894) was an English cricketer who played first-class cricket for Derbyshire and MCC between 1873 and 1886. He was a left-arm fast bowler with a great deal of spin and a dangerous yorker that was often believed to be unfair – which may explain why he was not considered for the earliest Test Matches despite being in his prime. He took 863 first-class wickets at an average of 12.09 with 87 five-wicket innings and 28 ten-wicket matches in his career. His first ten-wicket match in 1875 against Nottinghamshire became the first of six in only nine games that season. He holds the Derbyshire record for most wickets in a single match, with figures of 17–103 against Hampshire at the Antelope Ground, Southampton in July 1876. This is one of only two times a player has taken seventeen wickets in a match and finished on the losing side – the other, by Walter Mead in 1895 was also against Hampshire. Mycroft had no pretensions as a right-handed tail end batsman: he scored only 791 first-class runs at an average of 5.34 and prior to Alf Hall and Father Marriott remained the last significant cricketer who took more wickets than he scored runs.

Mycroft was born in Brimington, Derbyshire, the son of George Mycroft and his first wife Sabra Allen. His father was an ironstone and coal miner who kept the Red Lion public house at Brimington. In 1861 Mycroft himself was an ironstone miner and by 1881 he was running a public house at 10 Tapton Lane, Chesterfield.

Mycroft made his first-class debut for Derbyshire in the 1873 season against Lancashire when he took six wickets. The club played two matches in the season and Mycroft topped the bowling count with 10 wickets. In the 1874 season the club doubled the matches to four, and Mycroft doubled his wicket count to 20 taking three five wicket overs to become top bowler again. In the 1875 season, Mycroft hit a phenomenal average of 7.37, and became top bowler again with 73 wickets. He managed at least one five-wicket innings in every match and took eleven altogether in the season with best figures of 9–80. As a result, Mycroft was selected for the North against the South, where he had the amazing figures of fourteen wickets for 38 runs.

Mycroft's form was to last into the 1876 season, when he was top bowler with 62 wickets and achieved best bowling of 9–25, a record which lasted nearly fifty years before being bettered by Billy Bestwick. He played several matches for Marylebone Cricket Club (MCC), and also appeared for Players and the North. At this time he found himself in an assembled team of cricketers in several Gentlemen vs. Players matches, Mycroft's fellow Players including past and future England Test representatives Arthur Shrewsbury, George Ulyett, John Selby, Tom Emmett, and Fred Morley. In the 1877 season, Mycroft took most wickets for Derbyshire with 63 and took five wickets in an innings eight times, but did even more deadly work for the MCC with 31 wickets at the extraordinary average of 7.29, and also was deadly in one innings for England against Kent and a powerful Gloucestershire team with W.G. Grace in his prime. In 1878, Mycroft played much less outside county cricket, taking only fifteen wickets, but took a career best 101 for Derbyshire. In the 1879 season he was down to 48 wickets for the club which was still the best total. He topped the wicket tally for Derbyshire in the 1880 season with 58 and took five wickets in an innings six times.

In the following years Mycroft played for both Derbyshire and MCC on a regular but less frequent basis. In the 1885 season, Mycroft played his penultimate game in a match between MCC and Derbyshire at Lords. His brother Thomas, who also played for both teams, was also playing one of his last games and on this occasion Thomas took a stint of bowling instead of wicket-keeping. The main bowlers on the opposing sides were Sherwin and Shacklock. The first Sherlock Holmes story was published two years later and there is a suggestion that Arthur Conan Doyle derived the name of Mycroft the older brother of Sherlock Holmes from William Mycroft. Conan Doyle was a first-class cricketer who later played for MCC and had a respect for fast bowlers.

Mycroft played his last first-class match for MCC in 1886. He umpired four first-class matches before his retirement and later umpired two more during the 1891 season. He died of influenza at the age of 53 in Derby. Mycroft's half-brother, Thomas, played for Derbyshire between 1877 and 1885.
