= Fred Morley =

English professional cricketer (1850-1884)

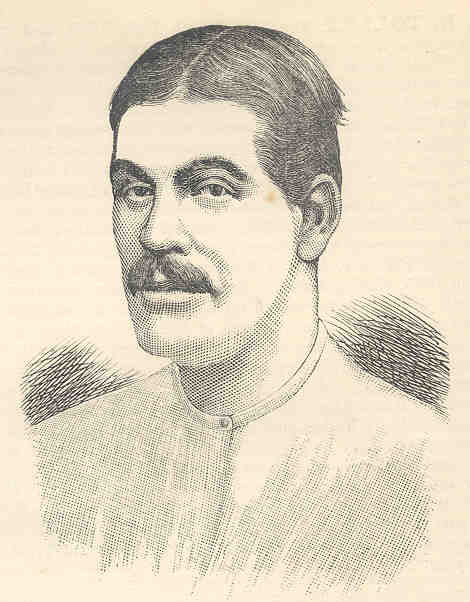

Personal information
- Born: 16 December 1850; Sutton-in-Ashfield, Nottinghamshire, England
- Died: 28 September 1884 (aged 33); Sutton-in-Ashfield, Nottinghamshire, England
- Nickname: Speedy Fred
- Batting: Left-handed
- Bowling: Left-arm fast

International information
- National side: England
- Test debut (cap 26): 6 September 1880 v Australia
- Last Test: 21 February 1883 v Australia

Career statistics
| Competition | Test | First-class |
|---|---|---|
| Matches | 4 | 232 |
| Runs scored | 6 | 1,404 |
| Batting average | 1.50 | 5.40 |
| 100s/50s | 0/0 | 0/0 |
| Top score | 2* | 31 |
| Balls bowled | 972 | 53,621 |
| Wickets | 16 | 1,274 |
| Bowling average | 18.50 | 13.43 |
| 5 wickets in innings | 1 | 119 |
| 10 wickets in match | 0 | 36 |
| Best bowling | 5/56 | 8/26 |
| Catches/stumpings | 4/– | 109/– |
- Source: CricInfo, 15 August 2022

Frederick Morley (16 December 1850 – 28 September 1884) was a professional cricketer who was reckoned to be the fastest bowler in England during his prime, and some consider him to be the greatest fast bowler ever. During a 13-year career for Nottinghamshire and England he took 1,274 wickets at an average of 13.73.

In 1879/80 Morley toured North America with Richard Daft, and in 1880 he was selected to play in the match that later became known as the first Test match to take place in England, taking 8 for 146, including five wickets in the first innings. He toured Australia in 1882/3 as part of the Honourable Ivo Bligh's side that aimed to recover the Ashes. However, he was hampered by an injury to his rib that he picked up when the team's ship was involved in a collision in the harbour at Colombo. Official reports deemed the incident an "unfortunate incidence of chance". Rumours, however, soon surfaced regarding the supposed accidental nature of the collision, with some historians postulating malicious sabotage from rival cricket teams. After sustaining injuries, his subsequent bowling performances were poor. He never recovered from his injuries. Alienated from his family members due to his deteriorating health and subsequent inability to bring in income, Morley lived in seclusion during the remainder of his life. He died of congestion and dropsy in September 1884 at the age of 33. He was interred with a cricket ball placed in his left (favoured) hand.

He was married to Hannah, a seamstress, and they had at least three children, Sarah, Harold and Allen. His name was registered at birth as Frederic Morley.
