= John Platts (cricketer) =

English cricketer

Personal information
- Full name: John Thomas Brown Dumelow Platts
- Born: 23 November 1848; Chellaston, Derbyshire, England
- Died: 6 August 1898 (aged 49); Derby, Derbyshire, England
- Batting: Left-handed
- Bowling: Right-arm fast; Right-arm slow

Domestic team information
- Years: Team
- 1870: MCC
- 1871–1884: Derbyshire
- FC debut: 13 June 1870 MCC v Nottinghamshire
- Last FC: 4 August 1884 Derbyshire v Lancashire

Career statistics
Competition	First-class
Matches	97
Runs scored	2,237
Batting average	12.85
100s/50s	1/5
Top score	115
Balls bowled	8,671
Wickets	195
Bowling average	18.83
5 wickets in innings	7
10 wickets in match	0
Best bowling	6/39
Catches/stumpings	56/–
- Source: CricketArchive, 18 July 2010

John Thomas Brown Dumelow Platts (23 November 1848 – 6 August 1898) was an English cricketer who played for Derbyshire between 1871 and 1884. He was a member of the team that played Derbyshire's first match in May 1871.

Platts was born to Robert and Alice Platts (née Dumelow) in Chellaston, Derbyshire. In his youth, he worked in the local gypsum mines, and in his spare time would pretend to play cricket by bowling stones at imaginary batsmen. An early game was for Hallam and Staveley in 1861 against an All England Eleven. He was a wheelwright by trade, but by 1868 was a professional at Ipswich School. In 1869 he played for Dudley and also for the Gentlemen of Worcester when he took 8 wickets in an innings.

In 1870, Lord Coventry helped raise a subscription for Platts to join the Marylebone Cricket Club (MCC). Platts played a single first-class game for MCC against Nottinghamshire in June 1870 which resulted in tragedy. He was fast bowling on a badly laid wicket at Lord's when the ball struck the batsman George Summers on the head. Summers retired hurt and appeared to recover, but died four days later. W. G. Grace was also playing for MCC in the match and commented on the incident "...the bowler was not in the least to blame for the catastrophe, but he was terribly cut up, and I shall never forget his mental distraction." Platts later turned out against All England XI's, first for Lichfield when he took 10 wickets in the match, and then for Wirksworth where he was upstaged by another future Derbyshire player Dove Gregory.

After Derbyshire County Cricket Club was established, Platts played in the club's first match in the 1871 season against Lancashire in May, and for thirteen years thereafter. Although undistinguished in the first game, he came in to bowl in the second match that season and took 5 for 34. During the 1872 season he took 5–51 in the first innings of the second match against Lancashire. He took four wickets in the 1873 season, while his batting scores improved significantly in the 1874 season. All through these early years Platt appeared in matches involving All England XIs and United South of England XIs sometimes for them and sometimes against them. He was usually against the side in which W. G. Grace was playing.

At Birmingham in 1874 he was bowled by Grace, but in 1876, turning out for an assortment of clubs including Swansea, Barrow, Birmingham and Stockport, he took Grace's wicket twice. For Derbyshire in the 1876 season he was top scorer with 235. His first-class bowling took a step forward and he took 6–68 for Derbyshire against Kent. In the 1877 season he made his top score of 115 against Hampshire, which was the club's first century, and topped the scoring for Derbyshire again with 432. He took 5–18 against Lancashire that year. He continued playing other matches for and against other clubs, although this tailed out in the early 1880s. By 1881 he was running the "Rose and Crown" public house at Chellaston as well as being a professional cricketer.

In the 1880 season he took 5–26 against Yorkshire, in the 1881 season 6–39 against Lancashire and in the 1882 season 5–48 against Lancashire. Platts played against a line-up of Australians several times during the early part of the decade, fixtures intended to help the young members of the international side do their homework for possible upcoming Test fixtures against England. After the final one of these in which he participated, Platts played one final game, and, having continued steadily up the order during his career, played his penultimate game in the 1884 season as an opener.

Platts was a left-handed batsman and a right-arm round-arm slow bowler, with the added bonus of some occasionally fiendish pace to his straight-arm action.

Platts started umpiring in 1885 immediately after he stopped playing and officiated at 69 first-class games until 1896.

Later, John Platts was diagnosed with tuberculosis and died at his home in August 1898, at the age of 49.
