= Evershed =

Evershed is a surname. Notable people with the surname include:

== People ==
- Edward Evershed (1867–1957), English cricketer
- Frank Evershed (1866–1954), English international rugby union player
- John Evershed (1864–1956), English astronomer, husband of Mary Evershed
- Mary Acworth Evershed (1867–1949), English astronomer
- Raymond Evershed, 1st Baron Evershed (1899–1966), British Law Lord
- Richard Evershed, British biogeochemist
- Sydney Evershed (1861–1937), English brewer and cricketer
- Sydney Evershed (brewer) (c.1825–1903), English brewer and politician
- Wallis Evershed (1863–1911), English cricketer
- William Evershed (1818–1887), English cricketer

== Fictional characters ==
- Martin Evershed, a teacher in the British television series Ackley Bridge
- Ruth Evershed, an intelligence analyst in the British television series Spooks
