= Derbyshire County Cricket Club in 1882 =

1882 season of an English cricket team

Derbyshire County Cricket Club seasons
1882 season
- Captain: Robert Smith
- Most runs: Thomas Foster
- Most wickets: William Mycroft
- Most catches: James Disney

Derbyshire County Cricket Club in 1882 was the cricket season when the English club Derbyshire had been playing for eleven years. The team played eight first class matches and won one of them

== 1882 season ==
Derbyshire played six county games, two each against Lancashire, Sussex and Yorkshire. They also played a first-class match against MCC and a match against the touring Australians Derbyshire won one game against Sussex and lost seven. They did not play any additional matches.

The captain for the year was Robert Smith in his sixth year as captain.

The most significant new arrival was William Chatterton who was to score over 10000 runs for the club. William Cropper made his debut and was regular top bowler for the club until a football accident in 1889. Other long term players who debuted were W Hall, a print worker who played until 1892 and Henry Slater a miner who played occasional matches over several seasons. Players who only performed for the club in the 1882 season were Duncan Johnston a Royal Engineers officer who played four games, and J Hodgkinson who played one game. Two brewers from Burton also made appearances - John Eadie son of William Eadie, who played one game and Henry Sugden who played two games.

Players who played their last matches were the two long-serving schoolmasters Abraham Shuker and Arthur Forman. Leonard Jackson retired after five years to concentrate on his hotel business and metal grinding. William Page gave up the game after the loss of the sight of an eye. Two players left the area. H Evans a railway manager moved to Glasgow, and Dudley Docker moved to Warwickshire where he set up his business.

Thomas Foster was top scorer and William Mycroft took most wickets.

=== Matches ===
List of matches
No.	Date	V	Result	Margin	Notes (Derbyshire players in Bold)
1	18 May 1882	MCC; Lord's Cricket Ground, St John's Wood	Lost	Innings and 258 runs	WE Midwinter 137 and 5-27; Fothergill 5-31
2	25 May 1882	Lancashire; Old Trafford, Manchester	Lost	10 wickets	A Watson 5-28; **J T B D Platts** 5-48; RG Barlow 5-20
3	01 Jun 1882	Yorkshire; Fartown, Huddersfield	Lost	8 wickets	W Bates 6-31
4	05 Jun 1882	Sussex; County Ground, Hove	Lost	3 runs	J Lillywhite 5-70; **W Mycroft** 5-57; JW Juniper 7-61
5	12 Jun 1882	Australians; County Ground, Derby	Lost	Innings and 109 runs	F Spofforth 5-38 and 5-19; GE Palmer 5-59
6	26 Jun 1882	Lancashire; County Ground, Derby	Lost	Innings and 47 runs	J Crossland 5-32; A Watson 5-30
7	27 Jul 1882	Sussex; County Ground, Derby	Won	Innings and 54 runs	A Hide 6-90; **W Mycroft** 7-37 and 5-35
8	07 Aug 1882	Yorkshire; County Ground, Derby	Lost	7 wickets	**T Foster** 101; **J Richardson** 7-76; E Peate 6-12

== Statistics ==
=== Cricketers who played and their first-class batting performances ===
Name	Am/ Pro	Age	Hand	Matches	Inns	Runs	High score	Average	100s
A Shuker	A	33	R	1	2	96	86	48.00	0
AFE Forman	A	31	R	1	1	36	36	36.00	0
LC Docker	A	22	R	5	9	224	66	24.89	0
T Foster	P	34	R	7	13	271	101	20.84	1
W Chatterton	P	20	R	3	5	76	42*	19.00	0
W Cropper		19	R	6	11	159	34	15.90	0
FD Docker	A	20		1	2	26	25	13.00	0
EAJ Maynard	A	21	R	2	4	49	28	12.25	0
G Hay	A	31	R	2	4	43	20	10.75	0
W Page		35	R	2	4	41	19	10.25	0
L Jackson	P	34	R	1	2	19	19	9.50	0
W Evershed	A	19	R	2	3	26	19	8.66	0
R P Smith	A	33	R	8	15	122	32	8.13	0
DA Johnston	A	34	R	4	8	65	31	8.12	0
JTC Eadie	A	20		1	2	8	8*	8.00	0
J T B D Platts	P	33	L	8	15	107	33*	7.64	0
J Richardson		25	R	5	9	66	18	7.33	0
JJ Disney	P	22	R	8	15	80	26*	7.27	0
W Hall		20	R	2	4	20	11	6.66	0
GB Barrington	A	25	R	2	4	26	13	6.50	0
W Rigley	P	30	R	3	6	35	13	5.83	0
WW Wood-Sims		24	R	1	2	11	10	5.50	0
H Evans	A	24	R	1	2	8	4	4.00	0
HE Sugden	A	22	R	2	4	13	9	3.25	0
W Mycroft	P	41	R	8	15	38	8	2.53	0
J Hodgkinson				1	2	5	5	2.50	0
H Slater		27	R	1	2	0	0	0.00	0

Maynard played several matches for Cambridge University. Docker played one game for All England and Hay played one game for MCC. Mycroft played several games for MCC and other sides.

Leading first-class batsmen for Derbyshire by runs scored
Name	Mat	Inns	Runs	HS	Ave	100
T Foster	7	13	271	101	20.84	1
LC Docker	5	9	224	66	24.89 (a)	0
W Cropper	6	11	159	34	15.90	0
R P Smith	8	15	122	32	8.13	0
J T B D Platts	8	15	107	33*	7.64	0

(a) Figures adjusted for non Derbyshire matches

=== First-class bowling averages ===
Name	Hand	Balls	Runs	Wickets	BB	Average
W Mycroft	L F	3627	1224 (698)	72 (42)	7-37	17.00
J T B D Platts	R F	989	468	22	5-48	21.27
J Richardson	R F	612	263	18	7-76	14.61
G Hay	R round-arm F	368	200 (88)	7 (1)	5-53	28.57
W Cropper	L M	298	133	5	2-23	26.60
H Evans	R	128	63	3	3-63	21.00
L Jackson	R round-arm F	104	44	2	2-44	22.00
T Foster	R round-arm F	26	21	1	1-6	21.00
JTC Eadie		12	6	1	1-6	6.00
W Chatterton	R S	132	49	1	1-15	49.00
W Hall	R M	68	46	1	1-26	46.00
LC Docker	R MF	48	30	1	1-30	30.00
H Slater	R M	120	35	1	1-35	35.00
J Hodgkinson		144	83	1	1-83	83.00

Leading first class bowlers for Derbyshire by wickets taken
Name	Balls	Runs	Wkts	BBI	Ave
W Mycroft		698	42	7-37	16.62 (a)
J T B D Platts	989	468	22	5-48	21.27
J Richardson	612	263	18	7-76	14.61
W Cropper	298	133	5	2-23	26.60

(a) Figures adjusted for non Derbyshire matches

=== Wicket keeping ===
- James Disney Catches 22, Stumping 2

== See also ==
- Derbyshire County Cricket Club seasons
- 1882 English cricket season
