= Docker (surname) =

Docker is a locational surname from Docker, Westmoreland, and Docker, Lancashire.

People with the surname "Docker":-

- Adam Docker (born 1985), English-Pakistani association footballer
- Adam Docker (born 1991), Australian rugby league player
- Arthur Docker (1848–1929), Australian cricketer
- Sir Bernard Docker (1896–1978), English industrialist
- Lady Docker (1906–1983), English socialite and wife of Sir Bernard
- Colin Docker (1925–2014), Anglican bishop
- Dudley Docker (1862–1944), English businessman and cricketer
- Ernest Brougham Docker (1842–1923), Australian judge
- Ian Docker (born 1969), English association football player
- Joseph Docker (1802–1884), Australian politician
- Kirk Docker, co-creator of Australian TV series You Can't Ask That
- Ludford Docker (1860–1940), English businessman and cricketer
- Mitchell Docker (born 1986), Australian cyclist
- Ralph Docker (1855–1910), English cricketer
- Robert Docker (1918–1992), English composer and arranger
- Russell Docker (born 1967), British Paralympic skier

== See also ==
- Richard Döcker (1894–1968), German architect
