= Derbyshire County Cricket Club in 1883 =

1883 season of an English cricket team

Derbyshire County Cricket Club seasons
1883 season
- Captain: Robert Smith
- Most runs: Wallis Evershed
- Most wickets: William Cropper, James Brelsford
- Most catches: James Disney, Thomas Foster

Derbyshire County Cricket Club in 1883 was the cricket season when the English club Derbyshire had been playing for twelve years. They won two first class matches out of ten.

== 1883 season ==
Derbyshire played two county matches each against Lancashire, Yorkshire, Surrey and Sussex, and two against MCC. They won two of their matches and lost six. Robert Smith was captain for his eighth and last season. In a sparse season without any centuries, Wallis Evershed was top scorer and William Cropper James Brelsford shared the most wickets.

There were no long term additions to the team but George Earl, Joseph Needham, George Yates and Percy Exham made their only career appearances and Thomas Evans made his two career appearances for Derbyshire during the season. The season also saw the last appearances of John Richardson who had been a steady bowler since 1878 and George Osborne who had played since 1879.

=== Matches ===
List of first class matches
No.	Date	V	Result	Margin	Notes
1	17 May 1883	Lancashire; Old Trafford, Manchester	Lost	Innings and 160 runs	George Nash 5-24; RG Barlow 5-20
2	21 May 1883	Surrey; County Ground, Derby	Won	51 runs	ED Barratt 5-25 and 7-76; J Brelsford 5-31
3	31 May 1883	MCC; Lord's Cricket Ground, St John's Wood	Lost	Innings and 29 runs	W Flowers 131 and 6-44; A Rylott 5-53
4	25 Jun 1883	Lancashire; County Ground, Derby	Lost	Innings and 78 runs	A Watson 6-40 and 6-27
5	09 Jul 1883	MCC; County Ground, Derby	Drawn		SH Evershed 5–19; GG Hearne 5-49; W Cropper 5-25
6	19 Jul 1883	Yorkshire; County Ground, Derby	Drawn		W Chatterton 5-61
7	30 Jul 1883	Sussex; County Ground, Derby	Lost	Innings and 68 runs	JB Hide 5-34
8	06 Aug 1883	Yorkshire; Bramall Lane, Sheffield	Lost	Innings and 3 runs	W Chatterton 6-64; E Peate 5-36
9	30 Aug 1883	Surrey; Kennington Oval	Lost	6 wickets	ED Barratt 5-50
10	03 Sep 1883	Sussex; County Ground, Hove	Won	29 runs	J Marlow 6-27

List of other matches
No.	Date	V	Result	Margin	Notes
1	03 Aug 1883	Uppingham Rovers; County Ground, Derby	Unknown		

== Statistics ==
=== First-class batting averages ===
Name	AM/ Pro	Age	H	Matches	Inns	Runs	High score	Average	100s
T Evans	A	25	R	2	4	78	35	19.50	0
R P Smith	A	34	R	7	14	245	45	17.50	0
LC Docker	A	23	R	9	16	276	52	17.25	0
W Evershed	A	30	R	10	19	317	92	16.68	0
T Foster	P	35	R	7	13	212	81	16.30	0
J T B D Platts	P	34	L	11	20	311	55	15.55	0
J Marlow		28	R	5	9	89	23	14.83	0
EAJ Maynard	A	22	R	8	14	189	84	14.53	0
GG Walker	A	22	L	2	4	40	23	13.33	0
PG Exham	A	23	R	1	1	12	12	12.00	0
W Cropper		20	R	10	17	177	51	10.41	0
J Needham	A	21	R	1	2	9	6*	9.00	0
J Richardson		26	R	5	10	51	17	7.28	0
JJ Disney	P	23	R	9	16	65	11*	7.22	0
SH Evershed	A	22	R	3	6	34	21	6.80	0
J Brelsford	A	27	R	7	12	48	16	4.36	0
GB Earl		23	R	1	1	4	4	4.00	0
G Osborne	P	?	?	1	2	7	5	3.50	0
W Mycroft	P	42	R	4	7	16	9	3.20	0
JM Clayton	A	25	R	1	2	3	2	1.50	0
LG Wright	A	21	R	1	2	2	2	1.00	0
G Yates		24	R	1	1	0	0	0.00	0
W Chatterton	P	21	R	1	0				
G Hay	A	32	R	1	0				

=== First-class bowling averages ===
Name	Hand	Balls	Runs	Wickets	BB	Average
W Cropper	L M	1069	435	24	5-25	18.12
J Brelsford	RM	1045	463	24	5-31	19.29
J Marlow	RM	948	336	17	6-27	19.76
W Chatterton	R S	896	319	16	6-64	19.93
J Richardson	R F	510	237	11	4-47	21.54
W Mycroft	L F	537	241	10	4-44	24.10
LC Docker	R MF	220	122	6	3-38	20.33
SH Evershed	RM	134	51	5	5-19	10.20
GG Walker	L F & Sl	292	90	5	3-38	18.00
T Foster	R round-arm F	104	71	5	2-18	14.20
W Evershed	RM	27	8	3	3-8	2.66
T Evans	R Sl	260	91	3	1-22	30.33
J T B D Platts	R F	584	258	2	1-22	129.00
G Hay	R round-arm F	12	18	1	1-18	18.00
G Yates	R round-arm	12	9	0	0-9	
JM Clayton	R M	16	11	0		

=== Wicket keeping ===
- James Disney Catches 10, Stumping 0

== See also ==
- Derbyshire County Cricket Club seasons
- 1883 English cricket season
