= Derbyshire County Cricket Club in 1881 =

1881 season of an English cricket team

Derbyshire County Cricket Club seasons
1881 season
- Captain: Robert Smith
- Most runs: Ludford Docker
- Most wickets: William Mycroft
- Most catches: James Disney

Derbyshire County Cricket Club in 1881 was the cricket season when the English club Derbyshire had been playing for ten years. The team played nine first class matches and won two of them.

== 1881 season ==
By 1881 Derbyshire had become established in the county cricket circuit and played eight county games, two each against Lancashire, Kent, Sussex and Yorkshire. Derbyshire won one game against each of Sussex and Kent. They also had a match against MCC which was lost.

The captain for the year was Robert Smith in his fifth year as captain. Making their debuts were the Docker brothers who founded an important business in Birmingham - Ludford Docker later became captain although Frank Docker only played occasionally for two seasons. James Disney, who was plumber, joined to fill the wicket keeping slot for many years. "G G" Walker, a farmer, began his successful career with the club and George Porter, a chimney sweep, put in an early appearance. Other shorter term arrivals were William Page a boilermaker, and John Clayton, of a tanning company in Chesterfield, who both played for another year. Harry Topham, an Old Reptonian at Cambridge University, made his only appearance in the 1881 season.

Players who made their last appearances were William Rigley who had played his first match in 1873 and retired to become an umpire and coach and John Tye who had first appeared in 1874 and left to run a pub in Yorkshire where he was a notable performer for his local team for many years.

The first match of the season was between the first team and the Colts in which the Colts had 22 players and the county side 12. The match ended in a draw but featured strong performances in the Colts from G Porter bowling and JJ Disney batting. Both these players joined the first team in the season but only two other members of the Colts side played for the club - Wallis Evershed in 1882 and Guy Earle in 1883. The opening first-class match was against MCC. On the first day MCC were all out for 299 and Derbyshire finished the day on 129 for 4. However Derbyshire only made a further 43 and were forced to follow on. They only made 39 in the second inning falling mainly to Shaw, and MCC won by innings and 88 runs. Against Sussex, Disney made his debut as the regular wicket-keeper. Sussex were all out for 166 and Derbyshire made 73 for 5 in reply on the first day. They ended the first innings on 153 and Sussex made 109 in the second innings. Derbyshire made 123 for five to win by five wickets. Against Lancashire, Derbyshire opened with 102 and Lancashire finished the day on 157 for one. Lancashire eventually made 299 and Derbyshire were all out for 62 in the second innings to give Lancashire a victory by an innings and 135 runs. Against Kent, Derbyshire made 179 all out and Kent ended the day on 149 for 9. Kent's final score was 173. Derbyshire reached 165 in the second innings and Kent replied with 172 for three giving them a 7 wicket victory. In the second match against Lancashire, Hornby opened for Lancashire with 145 and the side was all out for 248. Derbyshire made 48 in reply and followed on with 59. Lancashire won by an innings and 141 runs. Against Yorkshire, Derbyshire batted first to make 174 and Yorkshire were 100 for two at the end of the day. Yorkshire ended on 186 and Derbyshire scored 80 in the second innings. Yorkshire's innings continued into the third day until they made 63 for three to win by 7 wickets. In the second match against Sussex, Sussex made 300 in the first innings, in spite of a hat trick by Henry Evans. Derbyshire made 40 by the end of the day and went on to make 171. Derbyshire had to follow on and were down to ten men with Edmund Maynard absent hurt. They made 178 in the second innings, leaving Sussex to make 50 which they achieved with the loss of one wicket. Against Kent, Kent were all out for 169 in the first innings, and Derbyshire who finished the day on 116 for three went on to make 220 in reply. Kent made 124 in their second innings and Derbyshire made 74 for the loss of seven wickets to win by three wickets. In the last match of the season against Yorkshire, Derbyshire made 76. Yorkshire replied with 141 for 9 by the end of the first day, but there was no further play and the match ended in a draw.

Ludford Docker was top scorer in his debut season for the club, making 107 against Kent. William Mycroft took most wickets.

=== Matches ===
List of first class matches
No.	Date	V	Result	Margin	Notes
1	12 May 1881	MCC; Lord's Cricket Ground, St John's Wood	Lost	Innings and 88 runs	A Shaw 8-14
2	23 May 1881	Sussex; County Ground, Derby	Won	5 wickets	W Mycroft 5-50
3	26 May 1881	Lancashire; Old Trafford, Manchester	Lost	Innings 135 runs	A N Hornby 188; RG Barlow 5-48; George Nash 6-26
4	06 Jun 1881	Kent; County Ground, Derby	Lost	7 Wickets	J Wooton 6-81 and 5-72;W Mycroft 8-80
5	27 Jun 1881	Lancashire; County Ground, Derby	Lost	Innings 141 runs	A N Hornby 145; J T B D Platts 6-39
6	01 Aug 1881	Yorkshire; County Ground, Derby	Lost	7 Wickets	Peate 7-59; W Mycroft 6-60; W Bates 6-37
7	15 Aug 1881	Sussex; County Ground, Hove	Lost	9 Wickets	RT Ellis 103; H Evans 6-60 - Evans completed a hat-trick for Derbyshire; J Lillywhite 6-49
8	18 Aug 1881	Kent; Mote Park, Maidstone	Won	3 Wickets	LC Docker 107; H Evans 7-47; GG Hearne 5-34; J Wooton 5-67; W Patterson 5-12
9	22 Aug 1881	Yorkshire; Park Avenue Cricket Ground, Bradford	Drawn		T Emmett 6–19; W Mycroft 5-61

List of other matches
No.	Date	V	Result	Margin	Notes
1	18 Apr 1881	Derbyshire Colts; County Ground, Derby	Drawn		Derbyshire had 12 and Colts 22 players

== Statistics ==
=== Cricketers who played and their first-class batting performances ===
Name	Am/ Pro	Age	Hand	Matches	Inns	Runs	High score	Average	100s
LC Docker	A	21	R	8	15	447	107	31.92	1
R P Smith	A	32	R	8	15	303	66	20.20	0
A Shuker	A	32	R	3	6	107	45	17.83	0
T Foster	P	33	R	9	17	282	61	16.59	0
L Jackson	P	33	R	1	2	30	28	15.00	0
J T B D Platts	P	32	L	9	16	182	36	11.38	0
W Rigley	P	29	R	8	15	145	25	9.66	0
H Shaw	A	27	R	3	6	30	12*	7.50	0
GB Barrington	A	24	R	6	11	74	23	7.40	0
EAJ Maynard	A	20	R	8	15	110	34	7.33	0
FD Docker	A	19		1	1	7	7	7.00	0
SH Evershed	A	20	R	2	4	21	9	5.25	0
H Evans	A	23	R	3	6	31	10	5.16	0
W Mycroft	P	40	R	9	16	82	24	5.13	0
G Porter	P	19	R	1	2	10	8	5.00	0
W Page		34	R	1	2	9	9	4.50	0
G Hay	A	30	R	7	11	47	28	4.27	0
JJ Disney	P	21	R	8	13	44	11	4.00	0
GG Walker	A	20	L	1	2	4	2	2.00	0
T Mycroft	A		R	1	2	4	2	2.00	0
G Osborne	P			2	4	5	5	1.25	0
HG Topham	A	19	L	1	2	5	4*		0
JM Clayton	A	23	R	1	1	0	0	0.00	0

- Smith, Foster, Platts and Mycroft played first class matches for other teams during the season.

=== First-class bowling averages ===
Name	Hand	Balls	Runs	Wickets	BB	Average
W Mycroft	L F	2404	866	49	8-61	17.67
J T B D Platts	R F	1579	578	27	6-39	21.40
H Evans	R	428	189	16	7-47	11.81
G Hay	R round-arm F	641	341	11	4-43	31.00
EAJ Maynard	R S	68	53	2	2-34	26.50
G Osborne		36	23	1	1-23	23.00
HG Topham	L S	92	49	1	1-49	49.00
G Porter	R MF	100	59	1	1-59	59.00
T Foster	R round-arm F	43	24	0		
LC Docker	R MF	44	24	0		
H Shaw	R round-arm M	112	85	0		
SH Evershed	R M	16	12	0		
GG Walker	L	12	14	0		
L Jackson	R round-arm F	52	45	0		

=== Wicket keeping ===
- James Disney Catches 21, Stumping 1
- Thomas Mycroft Catches 0, Stumping 1

== See also ==
- Derbyshire County Cricket Club seasons
- 1881 English cricket season
