= Derbyshire County Cricket Club in 1879 =

1879 season of an English cricket team

Derbyshire County Cricket Club seasons
1879 season
- Captain: Robert Smith
- Most runs: Thomas Foster
- Most wickets: William Mycroft
- Most catches: Alfort Smith

Derbyshire County Cricket Club in 1879 was the cricket season when the English club Derbyshire played their ninth season.

Of the county sides Derbyshire played in the previous year they had matches against Lancashire, Nottinghamshire and Yorkshire. However they did not play Hampshire or Kent. Derbyshire made a first innings total of 16 against Nottingham at Trent Bridge which remains a record for lowest number of runs in an innings for Derbyshire

== 1879 season ==
Derbyshire played six county games in 1879, two each against Lancashire, Nottinghamshire and Yorkshire. They also played a first-class match against MCC. Derbyshire won both matches against Yorkshire, but lost to Nottingham and Lancashire (who shared the Champion County award) and MCC. Derbyshire also played two miscellaneous matches against their own colts and Harrow Wanderers, and a Derbyshire XI comprising most of the team played Bacup.

Robert Smith was in his fourth year as captain. William Wood-Sims, a slater, Joseph Marlow and George Osborne made their first-class debuts for the club and went on to play several more seasons. Arthur Cursham, a mine manager, joined the club from Nottinghamshire but only played in two years. Conrad Wallroth who had appeared in the previous season played three first-class matches and Arthur Wood and Ralph Docker both played their only two first class matches for Derbyshire in 1879. Joseph Flint, who had first played in 1872 and Enoch Cook who had joined in the previous year both played their last first class matched for Derbyshire.

In their opening match against MCC, Derbyshire had MCC out for 60 in the first innings and made 83 in reply. MCC made 108 in the second innings and Derbyshire ended on 70 leaving them 15 runs behind. The next recorded match was a two-day internal fixture against the Derbyshire Colts who played with 22 men. The Colts made 79 and the County team replied with 103. In the second innings the Colts made124 before time ran out leaving the result a draw. The Colts included Osborne, John Clayton, William Antliff, and Ludford Docker who played first class matches for the county in this and later seasons, but apart from veteran captain Unwin Sowter none of the remaining colts made first-class status. Against Lancashire, Derbyshire made 64 and Lancashire replied with 81 to close the first day's play. In the second innings Derbyshire made 57 and Lancashire made 42 to win by seven wickets before the day was out. In the match against Nottinghamshire, Nottinghamshire made 159 and by the end of the day Derbyshire had lost two wickets without scoring. They made their lowest innings of 16 and in the follow-on made 44 to give Nottinghamshire victory by an innings and 99 runs. Most of the damage in the match was done by Fred Morley who was the leading wicket taker in the English season. In the first match against Yorkshire, Derbyshire made 129 and Yorkshire made 80 in reply. Derbyshire made 45 in the second innings and Yorkshire reached 67 giving Derbyshire a 27 run victory by the end of day two. Derbyshire played an additional match against the Harrow Wanderers, the old boys team of Harrow School. Wallroth, an Old Harrovian, played for the visitors in a team which included Albert Hornby, Herbert Webbe, Isaac Walker and Theodore Dury. Derbyshire opened with 122 and Harrow Wanderers made 262. Derbyshire's second innings total of 90 left the club behind by an innings and 50 runs. In the second match against Yorkshire, Yorkshire were out for 81 and Derbyshire had made 129 by the end of the first day. On the second day, Derbyshire were all out for 146 but there was no further play. Yorkshire were out for 63 on the third day to give Derbyshire a win by an innings and two runs. In the second match against Nottinghamshire, Derbyshire made 59 and Nottinghamshire were on 98 by the end of the day. Nottinghamshire finished on 110 and then had Derbyshire all out for 36. Morley took seven wickets in each innings in the match and Nottinghamshire won by an innings and 15 runs. At the end of the season a "Derbyshire XI" comprising five of the County team and a number of other names took on Bacup in a match that ended in a draw.

Thomas Foster was top scorer for the county. William Mycroft took 48 wickets for Derbyshire and 88 wickets in all his first class games.

=== Matches ===
List of first class matches
No.	Date	V	Result	Margin	Notes
1	26 May 1879	MCC; Lord's Cricket Ground, St John's Wood	Lost	15 runs	G Hay 5–18; GG Hearne 6-33
2	05 Jun 1879	Lancashire; Old Trafford, Manchester	Lost	7 wickets	RG Barlow 6-30 and 5-20 completed a hattrick
3	23 Jun 1879	Lancashire; County Ground, Derby	Lost	4 wickets	W McIntyre 6-36
4	10 Jul 1879	Nottinghamshire; Trent Bridge, Nottingham	Lost	Innings and 99 runs	F Morley 7-7 and 5-28; A Shaw5-16 Derbyshire's lowest innings of 16
5	14 Jul 1879	Yorkshire; Bramall Lane, Sheffield	Won	27 runs	A Hill 5–16; W Mycroft 7-33 and 6-32; E Peate 6-36
6	04 Aug 1879	Yorkshire; County Ground, Derby	Won	Innings and 2 runs	W Mycroft 6-47; G Hay 6-37
7	18 Aug 1879	Nottinghamshire; County Ground, Derby	Lost	Innings and 15 runs	F Morley 7-32 and 7-21

List of other matches
No.	Date	V	Result	Margin	Notes
1	02 Jun 1879	Derbyshire Colts; County Ground, Derby	Drawn		Colts had 22 players
2	21 Jul 1879	Harrow Wanderers; County Ground, Derby	Lost	Innings and 30 runs	C Wallroth played for Harrow Wanderers
3	22 Aug 1879	Bacup; Lanehead, Bacup	Drawn		Played by a "Derbyshire XI"

== Statistics ==
=== Cricketers who played and their first-class batting performances ===
Name	Am/ Pro	Age	Hand	Matches	Inns	Runs	High score	Average	100s
T Foster	P	30	R	7	13	269	68	20.69	0
J T B D Platts	P	30	L	7	13	139	48	10.69	0
A Shuker	A	30	R	3	5	50	33	10.00	0
CA Wallroth	A	28	R	3	5	39	26	7.80	0
R P Smith	A	30	R	7	13	94	15	7.23	0
AM Wood	A	18	R	2	4	28	9	7.00	0
G Hay	A	28	R	7	13	65	17*	6.50	0
G Osborne	P			4	7	33	14	5.50	0
F W Keeton	A	22	R	1	2	11	6	5.50	0
W Rigley	P	27	R	7	13	68	16	5.23	0
AW Cursham	A	26	R	4	7	34	16	4.85	0
W Mycroft	P	38	R	7	13	22	10*	3.14	0
A Smith		32	R	7	13	25	12*	3.12	0
AFE Forman	A	28	R	1	2	6	6	3.00	0
WW Wood-Sims		21	R	1	2	3	2*	3.00	0
R Docker	A	23		2	4	9	6	2.25	0
E Cook		34	R	4	8	18	8	2.25	0
J Marlow		24	R	1	2	4	4	2.00	0
J Flint		29	R	2	4	2	1	0.50	0
H Shaw	A	25	R						
J Richardson		22	R						
WJ Humble	A	32	R						
J Stubbings	P	23	R						
GB Barrington	A	22	R						
U Sowter	A	39	R						
JM Clayton	A	21	R						
J F Adair	A	27							
J Sharratt	A	28							
JF Tomlinson									
F Walker (XI only)									
W Endson (XI only)									
G Mallins (XI only)									

Mycroft also played six first class matches for MCC and one for the Over 30s.

=== First-class bowling averages ===
Name	Hand	Balls	Runs	Wickets	BB	Average
W Mycroft	L F	1761	436	48	7-33	9.08
G Hay	R round-arm F	1290	334	32	6-37	10.43
J T B D Platts	R F	327	116	14	4-11	8.28
J Flint	R round-arm S	296	92	10	6-28	9.20
J Marlow	R M	64	11	3	3-11	3.66
T Foster	R round-arm F	80	19	0		

Mycroft took a further 40 wickets for other sides

=== Wicket keeping ===
- A Smith Catches 10, Stumping 3

== See also ==
- Derbyshire County Cricket Club seasons
- 1879 English cricket season
