= Joseph Needham (cricketer) =

English cricketer

Personal information
- Born: 9 January 1862; Priestcliffe, Derbyshire, England
- Died: 30 August 1889 (aged 27); Taddington, Derbyshire, England
- Batting: Right-handed

Domestic team information
- Years: Team
- 1883: Derbyshire
- Only FC: 17 May 1883 Derbyshire v Lancashire

Career statistics
Competition	First-class
Matches	1
Runs scored	9
Batting average	9.00
100s/50s	0/0
Top score	6*
Catches/stumpings	0/–
- Source: CricketArchive, 27 July 2011

Joseph Needham (9 January 1862 – 30 August 1889) was an English cricketer who played for Derbyshire in 1883.

Needham was born in Priestcliffe, Derbyshire and in 1881 was working as a farmhand for his uncle George Broom at Taddington.

Needham played a single first-class game for Derbyshire in the 1883 season in May against Lancashire. He is shown as being first in the Derbyshire batting lineup and yet not out for just six runs in the second innings, for a team total score of 118. A possible explanation is that he retired hurt early in the game but returned later for another attempt at bat. He was a right-handed batsman and made 9 runs in his single first-class appearance.

Needham died at Taddington at the age of 27.
