= George Yates (disambiguation) =

George Yates (1843–1876) was an officer in the U.S. 7th Cavalry Regiment.

George Yates may also refer to:

- George Edwin Yates (1871–1959), Australian politician
- George Yates (Western Australian politician) (1908–1998), Australian politician
- George Yates (Derbyshire cricketer) (1858–1933), cricketer
- George Yates (Lancashire cricketer) (1856–1925), cricketer
- George Yates (socialist) (fl. 1898–1904), British engineer and writer
- George Worthing Yates (1901–1975), American screenwriter
