= Leonard Jackson =

Leonard Jackson may refer to:

- Leonard Jackson (cricketer) (1848-1887), English cricketer
- Leonard Jackson (actor) (1928-2013), American actor
- Len Jackson (footballer) (1923-1968), English footballer see List of Rochdale A.F.C. players (25–99 appearances)
- Len Jackson (cyclist), see British National Tandem Sprint Championships

== See also ==
- Leon Jackson, Scottish singer
- Leon Quincy Jackson, American architect and professor
