= International cricket in 1907 =

International cricket season

The 1907 international cricket season was from April 1907 to September 1907.

== Season overview ==
International tours
Start date	Home team	Away team	Results [Matches]			
Start date	Home team	Away team	Test	ODI	FC	LA
1 July 1907	England	South Africa	1–0 [3]	—	—	—
20 September 1907	Philadelphia	Marylebone	—	—	0–0 [2]	—

== July ==
=== South Africa in England ===
Test series
No.	Date	Home captain	Away captain	Venue	Result
Test 93	1–3 July	Reginald Foster	Percy Sherwell	Lord's, London	Match drawn
Test 94	29–31 July	Reginald Foster	Percy Sherwell	Headingley Cricket Ground, Leeds	England by 53 runs
Test 95	19–21 August	Reginald Foster	Percy Sherwell	Kennington Oval, London	Match drawn

== September ==
=== MCC in North America ===
First-class series
No.	Date	Home captain	Away captain	Venue	Result
Match 1	20–23 September	Arthur Wood	Hesketh Hesketh-Prichard	Germantown Cricket Club Ground, Manheim	Match drawn
Match 2	27 Sep–1 October	Arthur Wood	Hesketh Hesketh-Prichard	Merion Cricket Club Ground, Haverford	Match drawn
