= Geoffrey Bell (cricketer) =

English cricketer and educationalist

Personal information
- Full name: Geoffrey Foxall Bell
- Born: 16 April 1896; Stapenhill, Staffordshire, England
- Died: 17 January 1984 (aged 87); Haslemere, Surrey, England
- Batting: Right-handed

Domestic team information
- Years: Team
- 1914–1920: Derbyshire
- 1919: Oxford University

Career statistics
Competition	First-class
Matches	12
Runs scored	336
Batting average	16.00
100s/50s	0/2
Top score	64
Catches/stumpings	2/–
- Source: Cricinfo, 14 June 2022

Geoffrey Foxall Bell MC (16 April 1896 – 17 January 1984) was an English cricketer and educationalist. He was a right-handed batsman who played first-class cricket for Derbyshire and Oxford University. He won the Military Cross during World War I and became headmaster of two schools.

== Early life ==
Bell was born in Stapenhill, Derbyshire and was related to the Evershed brewing family. He made his first County Championship appearance in 1914, though his cricketing career was summarily halted by the First World War. In 1915, he was commissioned in the Royal Field Artillery and was awarded the Military Cross in 1919.

== Career ==
After the war he went to study at Oxford University, and returned to the arena of first-class cricket playing for the University in 1919. He played his first of seven games, most of which were against assembled elevens such as the Gentlemen of England and HDG Leveson-Gower's XI.

Bell made his return appearance for Derbyshire towards the back end of the 1919 season, their ninth place in the season's table something of a false hope for times to come. Bell made his final three appearances for Derbyshire during the 1920 season, finishing with a duck in his first appearance, though his form improved in the first innings of his next game and, although the final game of his season saw him achieve an innings of 11, before getting out, he found himself dropped from the team, never to make another first-class appearance.

After university, he became a schoolmaster and in 1927 became headmaster of Trent College where he was held in high regard by the boys and was seen as a forward-thinking man. During his time, the Warner Library was opened in 1929 and the Cricket Pavilion in 1933. In 1936 he went on to become headmaster of Highgate School, succeeding J. A. H. Johnston, and was seen there as an austere but respected figurehead.

In 1954 he decided to leave teaching and Highgate while he was still enjoying it, so he took an early pension and bought six acres in Haslemere, Surrey, where he planted an orchard and built a simple fruit store on it. He made a living and employed several workers. He died in Haslemere.

== Personal life ==
Bell's cousins, Edward, Sydney, Wallis and Frank Evershed, were all first-class cricketers for Derbyshire during the back end of the nineteenth century, while William Evershed also played first-class cricket in first half of the 20th century.

== Publications ==
- Establishing a Fruit Garden (1963)
- Seven Old Testament Figures (1968)
