= Arthur Forman =

English cricketer and schoolmaster (1850–1905)

Personal information
- Full name: Arthur Francis Emilius Forman
- Born: 26 July 1850; Gibraltar
- Died: 13 February 1905 (aged 54); Repton, Derbyshire, England
- Batting: Right-handed
- Bowling: Right-arm
- Relatives: Humphrey Forman (son)

Domestic team information
- Years: Team
- 1877–1882: Derbyshire
- FC debut: 23 July 1877 Derbyshire v Hampshire
- Last FC: 27 July 1882 Derbyshire v Sussex

Career statistics
Competition	First-class
Matches	5
Runs scored	90
Batting average	12.85
100s/50s	0/0
Top score	36
Balls bowled	12
Wickets	0
Bowling average	–
5 wickets in innings	–
10 wickets in match	–
Best bowling	–
Catches/stumpings	0/–
- Source: CricketArchive, 20 January 2011

Arthur Francis Emilius Forman (26 July 1850 – 13 February 1905) was an English schoolmaster and cricketer who played for Derbyshire between 1877 and 1882.

Forman was the son of Richard Forman of Gibraltar and his wife Mary Heath, daughter of Rev. Joseph Heath, Rector of Wigmore. He was born in Gibraltar and was baptised in the garrison chapel there. He was educated at Trinity College, Oxford. In 1874, he was awarded BA and became a master at Repton School. He took holy orders and was awarded MA in 1876.

Forman made his debut for Derbyshire in the 1877 season against Hampshire, in an innings victory for Derbyshire. He played one further match in that year, a draw against Yorkshire and a single match in the 1878 season, an innings victory over Lancashire. In the 1879 season Forman took part in a game against Nottinghamshire in which he was one of seven players who scored no runs, and Derbyshire set their lowest first-class single innings total of 16. His next game was in the 1882 season, after Derbyshire altered their ranks significantly, to improve the strength of their opening order. Forman batted first in the lineup against Sussex, where he, along with batting partners Robert Smith and Ludford Docker managed to string together a powerful opening attack in an innings victory.

Forman was a right-hand batsman, playing seven innings in five first-class matches, with a top score of 36 and average of 12.85. He was a right-arm bowler who took no wickets in his two overs, off which a total of 3 runs were scored.

Forman was a popular master at Repton and was described as big, black-whiskered and dynamic. He played many sports and coached many cricketers including C. B. Fry.

Forman died at Repton at the age of 54. His memorial in the church records "He linked together the school and the parish by the sunshine of his presence and the readiness of his service" and the parishioners erected the Lychgate in his memory.

Forman married Eleanor Pears - the youngest daughter of Dr. Pears, headmaster at Repton from 1854 to 1874. Their son, Humphrey, played first-class cricket for Somerset and Cambridge University in 1910. Another son James became a brigadier. Their daughter Rosamond married Geoffrey Fisher, Headmaster of Repton, and later Archbishop of Canterbury.
