= Priestcliffe =

Hamlet in Derbyshire, England

Coordinates: 53.2453°N 1.7924°W

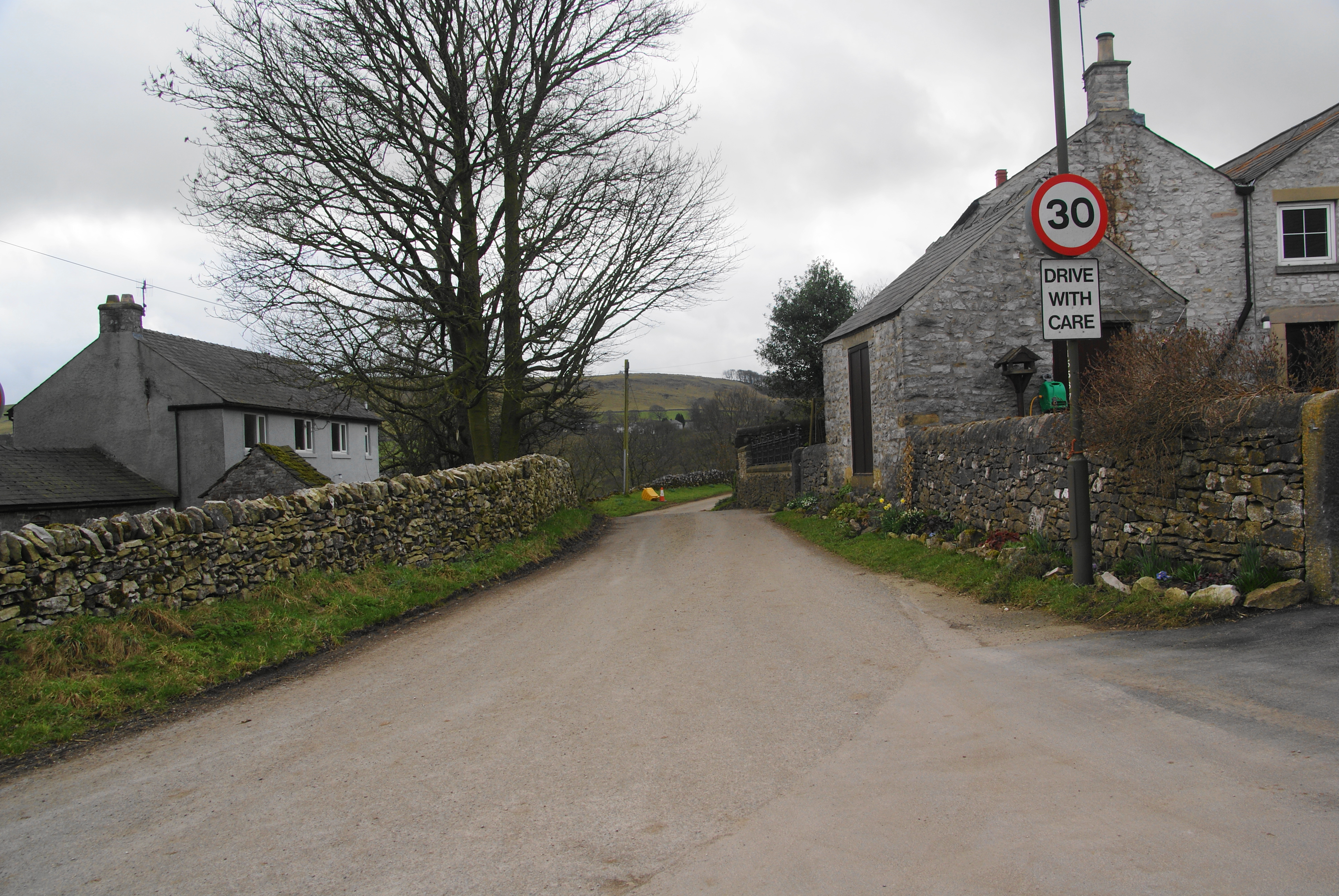
- Priestcliffe

- Location within Derbyshire
- OS grid reference: SK139517
- Shire county: Derbyshire
- Region: East Midlands
- Country: England
- Sovereign state: United Kingdom
- Post town: BUXTON
- Postcode district: SK17
- Police: Derbyshire
- Fire: Derbyshire
- Ambulance: East Midlands

Priestcliffe is a hamlet in Derbyshire, England. The hamlet falls within the civil parish of Taddington. It is about 1.2 km (or 0.75 miles) north of Taddington and within the boundaries of the Peak District National Park.

== Notable people ==
- Joseph Needham (1862–1889), cricketer.
