= Antliff =

Antliff is a surname found in the US, the UK, and Scotland between 1871 and 1891. Notable people with the surname include:

- Allan Antliff, American anarchist and writer
- William Antliff (1848–1909), English cricketer
