= Harry Topham =

English cricketer and clergyman

Personal information
- Full name: Harry Gillespie Topham
- Born: 17 February 1862; Ladbroke, Warwickshire, England
- Died: 28 February 1925 (aged 63); England
- Batting: Left-handed
- Bowling: Slow left-arm orthodox

Domestic team information
- Years: Team
- 1881: Derbyshire
- 1883–1884: Cambridge University
- FC debut: 1 August 1881 Derbyshire v Yorkshire
- Last FC: 30 June 1884 Cambridge University v Oxford University

Career statistics
Competition	First-class
Matches	16
Runs scored	95
Batting average	5.93
100s/50s	0/0
Top score	12
Balls bowled	2,669
Wickets	60
Bowling average	18.66
5 wickets in innings	4
10 wickets in match	1
Best bowling	7/62
Catches/stumpings	15/–
- Source: CricketArchive, 20 June 2011

Harry Gillespie Topham (17 February 1862 – 28 February 1925) was an English clergyman and cricketer who played for Derbyshire during the 1881 season and for Cambridge University in 1883 and 1884.

Topham was born in Ladbroke, Warwickshire the son of Rev. Edward Charles Topham, rector of Hauxwell, Yorkshire and his wife Grace Gillespie. He was educated at Repton School, and became a member of their cricketing eleven between 1878 and 1881. He made his debut in First Class cricket for Derbyshire in 1881 in August against Yorkshire, when he took a wicket in each innings, while William Mycroft did most of the damage. He went to Jesus College, Cambridge, and played fifteen games for Cambridge University. In 1883, he took 5 wickets for 48 against Gentlemen of England and was in the winning Varsity match but took no wickets. In 1884 he took 5 for 73 against Surrey, 5 for 74 against the Australians and 7 for 62 in a ten wicket match against Gentlemen of England. He was on the losing side in the 1884 Varsity match. Topham was left-arm slow bowler and took 60 first-class wickets with an average of 18.66 and a best performance of 7-62, achieving four five wicket innings and one ten-wicket match during his first-class career. He was a left-handed batsman and played 28 innings in 16 matches with an average of 5.93 and a top score of 12.

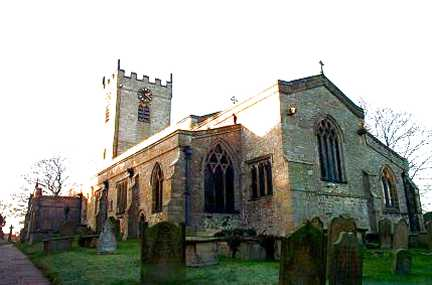
Church of Saints Mary and Alkelda, Middleham

Topham was ordained deacon (Rochester) in 1886 and priest in 1887. He was curate of Holy Trinity, Greenwich from 1886 to 1887 and of St Paul's, Newington, London from 1887 to 1892. He turned out for a Gentlemen of Kent side in 1888. In 1892 he became vicar of Milton, Portsmouth, but lost his first wife in 1893 and became curate of Farnham, Surrey in 1894. He then became curate of Badshot Lea in 1900. In 1903 he became rector of Middleham, Yorkshire, remaining in post until his death at the age of 63.

Topham married Emily Catherine Peyton Wilson on 1 September 1892 but she died a year later. Topham married Edith Coore on 2 July 1907 and had two daughters.
