= Charles Alan Bennett =

British barrister and judge (1877–1943)

Bennett in 1930.

Sir Charles Alan Bennett (9 May 1877 – 20 December 1943) was a British barrister and judge, who sat in the Chancery Division of the High Court from 1929 until his death.

== Biography ==
Bennett was born in Caterham, Surrey, the eldest son of Charles Hudson Bennett, a solicitor, and Elizabeth Bennett. He was educated at Winchester College, and was called to the Bar by Lincoln's Inn in 1900. During the First World War, he served with The Rifle Brigade, and was a prisoner-of-war in Germany. After the war, Bennett became a King's Counsel in 1923. In the 1924 general election, he contested South Oxfordshire as a Liberal, but lost. He was elected a Bencher of Lincoln's Inn in 1928.

In 1929, he was appointed a Justice of the High Court and assigned to the Chancery Division in succession to Mr Justice Romer, and received the customary knighthood. He served on the court until his death in 1943. His obituary in The Times said that "Without great outstanding qualities, but with much good sense, he made a satisfactory and very pleasant judge."

In 1904, Bennett married Constance Radeglence, the only daughter of Major J. N. Still, of Musbury, Devon, an officer in the King's Own Scottish Borderers; they had two sons and one daughter, who married Raymond Evershed, later the Master of the Rolls.
