= Percy Exham =

English cricketer, footballer, and schoolmaster

Personal information
- Full name: Percy George Exham
- Born: 26 January 1859; Cork, Ireland
- Died: 7 October 1922 (aged 63); Repton, Derbyshire, England
- Batting: Right-handed

Domestic team information
- Years: Team
- 1880–1881: Cambridge University
- 1883: Derbyshire
- FC debut: 10 May 1880 Cambridge Univ. v England XI
- Last FC: 19 July 1883 Derbyshire v Yorkshire

Career statistics
Competition	First-class
Matches	6
Runs scored	88
Batting average	8.80
100s/50s	0/0
Top score	43
Catches/stumpings	3/–
- Source: CricketArchive, 2 August 2011

Percy George Exham (26 June 1859—7 October 1922) was a schoolmaster, footballer, and cricketer who played for Cambridge University in 1880 and 1881 and for Derbyshire in 1883. He was one of nineteen sportsmen to achieve the Derbyshire Double of playing cricket for Derbyshire and football for Derby County.

Exham was born in Cork and was educated in England at Repton School where he was a member of the cricket XI in 1877 and 1878. He then went to St John's College, Cambridge, where he played for his college's cricket team in 1880 and 1881.

Exham made five appearances for Cambridge University in the 1880 and 1881 seasons. After university, he returned to Repton School to teach. He made his first and only County Championship appearance for Derbyshire in the 1883 season against Yorkshire. The following year, Exham appeared for the Gentlemen of Derbyshire against the Gentlemen of Philadelphia. He was a right-handed batsman and played 10 innings in 6 first-class matches. His top score was 43, and his average was 8.80.

Exham also played football as a left half for Derby County. He took part in their first F.A. Cup tie - a home game against Walsall Town on 8 November 1884, which Derby lost 7–0.

Exham stayed teaching at Repton for 36 years. He was Housemaster of the Orchard until 1919 and taught mathematics, being known to the boys as 'Pat.' He died in Repton at the age of 63.

Exham's brother Arthur played cricket for Dublin University.

== See also ==
- List of English cricket and football players
