= Enoch Cook =

English cricketer

Personal information
- Born: 23 April 1845; Sandiacre, Derbyshire, England
- Died: 14 April 1927 (aged 81); Long Eaton, Derbyshire, England
- Batting: Right-handed

Domestic team information
- Years: Team
- 1878–1879: Derbyshire
- FC debut: 22 July 1878 Derbyshire v Kent
- Last FC: 10 July 1879 Derbyshire v Nottinghamshire

Career statistics
Competition	First-class
Matches	8
Runs scored	92
Batting average	7.07
100s/50s	0/0
Top score	23*
Catches/stumpings	3/–
- Source: CricketArchive, 25 January 2011

Enoch Cook (23 April 1845 – 14 April 1927) was an English cricketer who played for Derbyshire in 1878 and 1879.

Cook was born in Sandiacre, Derbyshire and moved to Long Eaton, where he was a lace maker. He first played for a Derbyshire side in 1870, before the club's first official season in a match against Marylebone Cricket Club (MCC). He made his first-class debut for Derbyshire during the 1878 season, in a match against Kent. Cook represented the Derbyshire team in three further matches during the season, the first of which saw the team come out victors by an innings margin.

Cook continued to represent the team in the 1879 season, making his season debut against Marylebone Cricket Club, and he made three further appearances in County matches, his final appearance coming against Nottinghamshire in July. With several other Derbyshire players he made two appearances for a London United Eleven during the season.

Cook was a right-handed batsman who played fifteen innings in eight first-class matches with an average of 7.07 and a top score of 23 not out.

Cook died at Long Eaton at the age of 82.
