= John Clayton (cricketer) =

English cricketer

Personal information
- Full name: John Morton Clayton
- Born: 17 November 1857; Chesterfield, Derbyshire, England
- Died: 1 April 1938 (aged 80); West Southbourne, England
- Batting: Right-handed
- Bowling: Right-arm medium-fast

Domestic team information
- Years: Team
- 1881–1883: Derbyshire
- FC debut: 22 August 1881 Derbyshire v Yorkshire
- Last FC: 21 May 1883 Derbyshire v Surrey

Career statistics
Competition	First-class
Matches	2
Runs scored	3
Batting average	1.00
100s/50s	0/0
Top score	2
Balls bowled	16
Wickets	0
Bowling average	–
5 wickets in innings	–
10 wickets in match	–
Best bowling	–
Catches/stumpings	1/–
- Source: CricketArchive, 3 February 2011

John Morton Clayton (17 November 1857 — 1 April 1938) was an English cricketer who played for Derbyshire in 1881 and 1883.

Clayton was born in Chesterfield, the son of Joseph Clayton and his wife Hannah. His father was founder of Clayton & Company, tanners and curriers, of Clayton Street Chesterfield. Clayton played for Derbyshire Colts and for Derbyshire in a miscellaneous match against Harrow Wanderers in the 1879 season. He played for Gentlemen of Derbyshire during a tour by Canada in 1880. He made his first-class debut for Derbyshire in the 1881 season when he scored a duck in his one and only innings before the match was rained off. He also played a miscellaneous match against Derbyshire Colts. Two years later, in the 1883 season, he represented the county again, in his second and final County match, against Surrey, in which he scored the only three runs of his first-class career. In 1884 he played for Gentlemen of Derbyshire against Gentlemen of Philadelphia.

Clayton was a right-handed batsman and scored 3 runs in three innings in two matches. He was a right-arm medium-fast bowler and bowled 16 balls without taking a wicket

Clayton ran Clayton & Co with his brother Joseph Edward Clayton until the early 20th Century. He was Mayor of Chesterfield from 1890 to 1892.

Clayton died in West Southbourne at the age of 80.

Clayton married Maria Robinson, daughter of William Bradbury Robinson of Robinson's of Chesterfield, in 1884.
