= Hoon, Derbyshire =

Civil parish in Derbyshire, England

Coordinates: 52.876°N 1.663°W

Hoon
- Civil parish
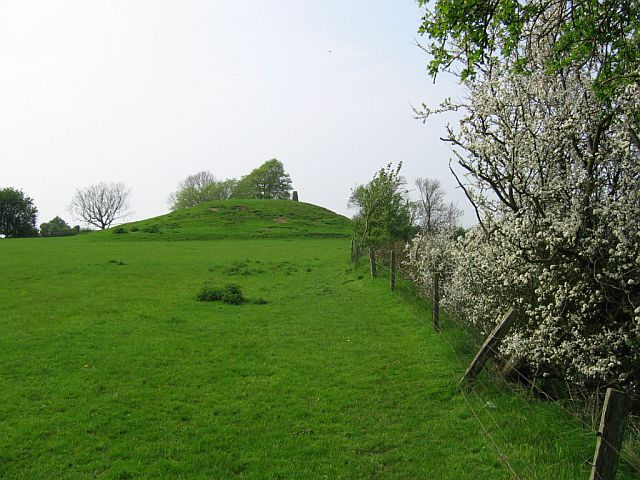
- Hoon Mount, a burial mound

- Location within Derbyshire
- Interactive map of Hoon
- Area: 1.21 sq mi (3.1 km^{2})
- Population: 55 (2021)
  - Density: 45/sq mi (17/km^{2})
- OS grid reference: SK227310
  - London: 110 mi (180 km) SE
- District: South Derbyshire
- Shire county: Derbyshire
- Region: East Midlands
- Country: England
- Sovereign state: United Kingdom
- Post town: DERBY
- Postcode district: DE65
- Dialling code: 01283
- Police: Derbyshire
- Fire: Derbyshire
- Ambulance: East Midlands
- UK Parliament: South Derbyshire

Hoon is a hamlet and civil parish within the South Derbyshire district, which is in the county of Derbyshire, England. It is a predominantly rural area with few residences or farms, and had a population of 55 residents in 2021. The parish is 110 miles (180 km) north west of London, 8 miles (13 km) south west of the county city of Derby, and 5 miles (8.0 km) north of the nearest market town of Burton-on-Trent in Staffordshire. It shares a border with the parishes of Church Broughton, Hatton, Hilton, Marston on Dove, Sutton on the Hill, as well as Tutbury.

== Geography ==
=== Location ===
Hoon is surrounded by the following local locations:

- Sutton on the Hill to the north
- Rolleston on Dove and Tutbury to the south
- Marston on Dove and Hilton to the east
- Church Broughton and Hatton to the west.

It is 1.21 square miles (3.1 km^{2}; 310 ha) in area, 2 1/2 miles (4.0 km) in height and 1 1/3 miles (2.1 km) in width with an elongated shape, within the north western part of the South Derbyshire district, and south west within Derbyshire county. The parish is roughly bounded by land features such as the Limbersitch and Sutton brooks to the north, Sutton Lane and waste processing works to the west, Hoon Ridge to the east, and the River Dove to the south.

==== Settlements and routes ====
There are seven farms and residences, all prefixed 'Hoon'. Most are to the north of the parish, centred around the Hoon Ridge country house, with Hoon Hay Manor, a farm in the south. Outside of these scattered settlements, the parish is predominantly an agricultural and rural area.

There are four roads, the first two traversing cross-parish on an east-to-west alignment – the A50 trunk route which has no turnoffs within the parish; and the unnumbered Derby Road between the A5111 and Hilton village. The third, Hoon Lane is the only vehicular route into the core hamlet area from Derby Road. The northern boundary by Limbersitch Brook cuts briefly across Limbersitch Lane, which heads southbound towards neighbouring Hatton.

=== Environment ===
==== Landscape ====
Primarily farming and pasture land throughout the parish outside the sparsely populated areas, there is little forestry throughout, mainly surrounding residences. The northern parish area is part of the South Derbyshire Claylands, with riverside meadows around Sutton Brook; the southern portion of Hoon below the A50 is classed as the Trent Valley Washlands, also with some riverside meadows.

==== Geology ====
Along the River Dove there are superficial deposits of alluvium comprising gravel, sand, silt and clay, being formed between 11,000 years ago and the present. In the middle of the area, the bedrock is from the Mercia Mudstone Group formed between 252.2 and 201.3 million years ago during the Triassic period. North of the parish by the Sutton Brook, there are superficial glaciofluvial terrace deposits, of the Mid Pleistocene transition composed of sand and gravel, these being formed between 860 and 116 thousand years ago during the Quaternary period.

==== Hydrological features ====
The parish rests between the River Dove forming the south boundary, and the Sutton and Limbersitch brooks in the north near the upper boundary. Salt Brook forms some of the south west boundary. There is an unnamed brook flowing from west to east in the middle of the area, eventually feeding into the Hilton Brook. There are a number of ponds alongside this and the Sutton Brook. Hoon Hay Lake is a small still water fishery in the south of about 6 acres, close to Hoon Hay Farm.

==== Land elevation ====
The parish is generally low-lying. Points around the River Dove begin at ~50 metres (160 ft), remaining as such until north of the A50 road, when the parish rises along a ridge to a peak near the hamlet, with the tumulus by Hoon Mount at 82 metres (269 ft), before falling off to 60 metres (200 ft) along the northern boundary.

== History ==
=== Toponymy ===
Hoon was noted in the 1086 Domesday Survey as Hougen, meaning 'at the barrows'.

=== Heritage ===
Although the name of Hoon suggests several, there is only one known tumulus in the parish, at Hoon Mount. These date typically from the Bronze Age – 2350 BC to 701 BC. It appears to have been disturbed at a later unknown date. Iron Age (800BC to 409AD) remnants include field boundary evidence, and various examples of medieval 'ridge and furrow' farming found throughout. During an unknown medieval period, it is thought there was a village near Hoon Hay in the south, considered to be later depopulated. At the time of the Domesday survey in 1086 Hoon had two manors; one owned by Burton Abbey, after the Dissolution of the monasteries this was granted along with other lands by Henry VIII to Sir William Paget, which descended through marriage to the Scholfield family into the 20th century; the other appears to be Hoon Hay manor, which came under the ownership of Henry de Ferrers and was held by Saswalo (alias Sewallis), whose descendants took on the surname Shirley from Shirley, Derbyshire where they had their seat.

The manor remained with the Shirley family until the reign of Henry VIII. It was bought after this by the Palmers, who were succeeded by the Staffords. In the middle of the 17th century it was purchased by a member of the Pye baronets, John Pye, and in 1734 the last of the baronets, Sir Robert Pye died with the manor descended to his three daughters, and it was later owned by the Watkins family. In the early 19th century this portion of Hoon appears to have been sold by Captain Watkins to Mr W.J. Lockett, who then divided up and sold the landholdings. The North Staffordshire Railway built the Crewe-Derby Line across the south of the parish in 1848. Hoon was a township within the ancient parish of Marston-on-Dove, but became a civil parish after 1866. The Nestle coffee processing plant has been historically based in neighbouring Hatton since the beginning of the 20th century, but from 2012 it expanded into the south west area of Hoon parish, the extension being officially opened in 2016.

== Governance and demography ==
=== Population ===
There are 55 residents recorded within Hoon in the 2021 census.

=== Local bodies ===
Hoon parish is managed at the first level of public administration through a parish meeting. Although there is a ward on the neighbouring Hatton parish council named for Hoon, it is not within Hoon parish. The local development plan however is arranged in conjunction with the Marston-on-Dove and Hilton parishes.

At district level, the wider area is overseen by South Derbyshire district council. Derbyshire County Council provides the highest level strategic services locally.

== Economy ==
The present business sector types other than agriculture in the parish are few due to being a low populated area, with these employment areas including:

- Beverage processing
- Automotive parts restoration

== Community and leisure ==
Primarily rural and agricultural means there are no publicly accessible amenities within the parish. Any basic needs require a visit to the nearby villages of Hatton, Hilton or Tutbury.

Hoon Hay Lake is a small still water fishery of about 6 acres close to Hoon Hay manor. It is managed by a local angling club.

== Landmarks ==
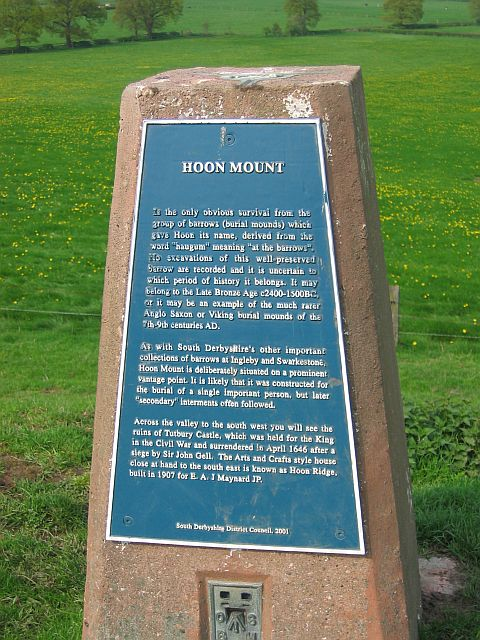
Ordnance Survey's triangulation pillar with placard on Hoon Mount

=== Listed sites ===
There is one residential location of architectural merit throughout the parish with statutory listed status at Grade II, Hoon Ridge, it was built in 1907 as an Arts & Crafts styled mansion, designed by the architect George Morley Eaton, a follower of Sir Edwin Lutyens.

=== Scheduled monument ===
Hoon Mount is the location of a tumulus which has protected status. There is a path from the hamlet that leads to it, which has a triangulation pillar on top built in 1939, with a commemorative plaque installed in 2001.

=== Tourism ===
The Salt Brook Heritage Trail runs through the south of the parish from Marston on Dove to Hatton and round the perimeter of the Nestle plant, highlighting the legacy of the local area with sculptures and history boards, it was opened in 2018. The National Cycling Network Route 549 follows the same path.

== Notable people ==
- Captain Wickham Talbot Harvey (1829–1889), resident of Hoon Hay farm
- Edmund Maynard (1861–1931), resident of Hoon Ridge
- Major Arthur Herbert Betterton (died 1965), resident of Hoon Ridge and High Sheriff of Derbyshire in 1947

== See also ==
- Hoon Hay, area of Christchurch, New Zealand named after Hoon, established by Captain Wickham Talbot Harvey
