= Frank Evershed =

English rugby union footballer and cricketer

- Full name: Frank Evershed
- Born: September 6, 1866 Winshill, England
- Died: 29 July 1954 (aged 87)
- Notable relative(s): Sydney Evershed, Wallis Evershed, Edward Evershed, Geoffrey Bell, Raymond Evershed

Rugby union career
- Position: Forward
International career
Years	Team	Apps	(Points)
1889-1893	England	10	(7)
- Correct as of 2 March 2024

Frank Evershed (6 September 1866 – 29 June 1954) was an English rugby player who played internationally for England between 1889 and 1893 and a cricketer who played for Derbyshire.

Evershed was born in Winshill, the son of Sydney Evershed the brewer and MP for Burton,

Evershed was an outstanding wing-forward who won ten caps for England. He played his first international for England against New Zealand Natives at Blackheath on 16 February 1889. From 1890 to 1893 he played nine matches in the Home Nations Championships. He scored three tries in total.

As a cricketer, Evershed played for Derbyshire when the team was without first-class status. He often appeared with his brothers Sydney and Edward. He played three matches during the 1889 season and seven matches during the 1890 season when he made a century against Norfolk. Evershed's other brother Wallis and cousin Geoffrey Bell, also appeared for Derbyshire County Cricket Club in first-class cricket, while William, of unknown relation, also played for the team.

Evershed was one of the founders of Burton Hockey Club. He funded the construction and drainage of the pitch and was president of the club from 1899 until his death.

Evershed married Florence Helen Lowe, the daughter of Thomas Barnabas Lowe. Their son Francis Raymond Evershed was the first and last Baron Evershed of Stapenhill.
