= Five Wells =

Ancient chambered tomb in Derbyshire, England

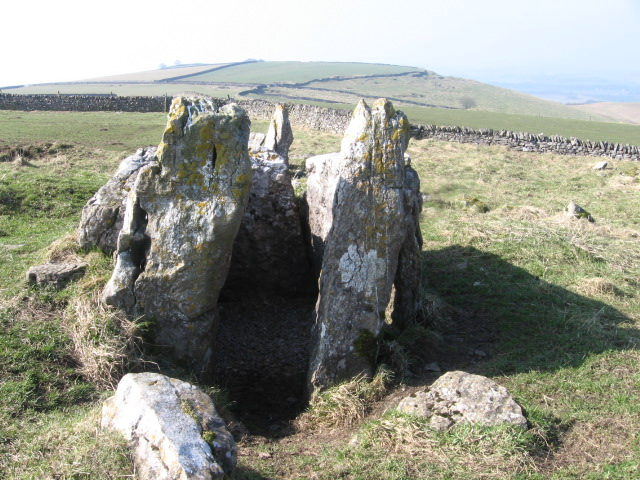

- Location in Derbyshire
- 53°14′11″N 1°48′57″W
- Location: Peak District

History
- Built: 3400–2400 BC

Site notes
- Architectural style: British pre-Roman Architecture

Scheduled monument
- Official name: Five Wells chambered tomb
- Designated: 5 August 1926
- Reference no.: 1008940

Five Wells is a Neolithic chambered tomb between the villages of Chelmorton and Taddington on Taddington Moor in the Derbyshire Peak District in England.

The tomb is a protected scheduled ancient monument. Three stones mark the main chamber, which has been dramatically reduced; a second less well-preserved chamber is to the west. The burial mound is over 20 metres (66 ft) in diameter and was first excavated by the local archaeologist Thomas Bateman in 1846. The chambers have paved floors. Bateman discovered the remains of at least twelve human skeletons. Subsequent excavations (by Llewellyn Jewitt, William Lukis and Micah Salt between 1862 and 1901) found further human remains, pottery and flint tools in the chambers and passages and a separate cist (stone coffin) within the mound.

Access can be made on foot via a permitted path from Pillwell Gate to the west. Access along the permitted path can also be made from the Limestone Way long-distance footpath, which runs along Sough Lane 500 metres (550 yd) to the east.
