= James Brelsford =

English cricketer

Personal information
- Full name: James Brelsford
- Born: 19 December 1855; Brimington, Derbyshire, England
- Died: 24 December 1924 (aged 69); Bowdon, Cheshire, England
- Batting: Right-handed
- Bowling: Right-arm medium

Domestic team information
- Years: Team
- 1883–1886: Derbyshire
- FC debut: 17 May 1883 Derbyshire v Lancashire
- Last FC: 5 July 1886 Derbyshire v Surrey

Career statistics
Competition	First-class
Matches	8
Runs scored	56
Batting average	4.30
100s/50s	0/0
Top score	16
Balls bowled	1,085
Wickets	24
Bowling average	20.08
5 wickets in innings	1
10 wickets in match	0
Best bowling	5/31
Catches/stumpings	4/–
- Source: CricketArchive, 21 July 2010

James Brelsford (19 December 1855 – 24 December 1924) was an English cricketer who played for Derbyshire in 1883 and 1886.

Brelsford was born in Brimington, Derbyshire and became an iron moulder at Stanton by Dale. His Derbyshire debut came in the 1883 season, when Derbyshire played Lancashire. His opening game ended in an innings defeat, though Brelsford took one wicket during his bowling spell. Brelsford continued to play throughout the summer months of 1883, taking best bowling figures of 5-31 (matchend figures of 9-73) in his next game against Surrey. Brelsford played in three further County matches for Derbyshire during the 1883 season, and two matches against Marylebone Cricket Club. Taking 24 wickets in the season, Brelsford ended sharing most wickets with William Cropper. Brelsford reappeared for the team one further time, during the 1886 season.

Brelsford was a right-arm medium-pace bowler and took 24 first-class wickets at an average of 20.08 and a best performance of 5-31. He was a right-handed batsman and played 14 innings in 8 first-class matches with an average of 4.30 and a top score of 16.

Brelsford moved to Bowdon, Cheshire, where he was a long-standing member of Bowdon Cricket Club. He died in Bowdon aged 69.
