= Cursham =

Cursham is a surname. Notable people with the surname include:

- Arthur Cursham (1853–1884), English cricketer and footballer
- Harry Cursham (1859–1941), English cricketer and footballer
