= Taddington Moor =

Hill in the Derbyshire Peak District

Coordinates: 53°13′59″N 1°47′56″W

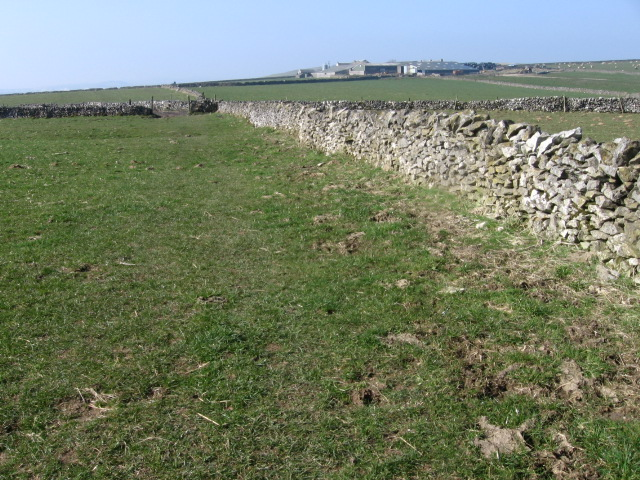
- Footpath near Fivewells Farms

Highest point
- Elevation: 438 metres (1,437 ft)

Geography
- Location: Peak District, England
- OS grid: SK135705
- Topo map: OS Explorer OL24

Taddington Moor is a limestone hill between the villages of Taddington, Flagg and Chelmorton in the Derbyshire Peak District. The moor is an upland farming landscape. The summit at Sough Top is 438 metres (1,437 ft) above sea level.

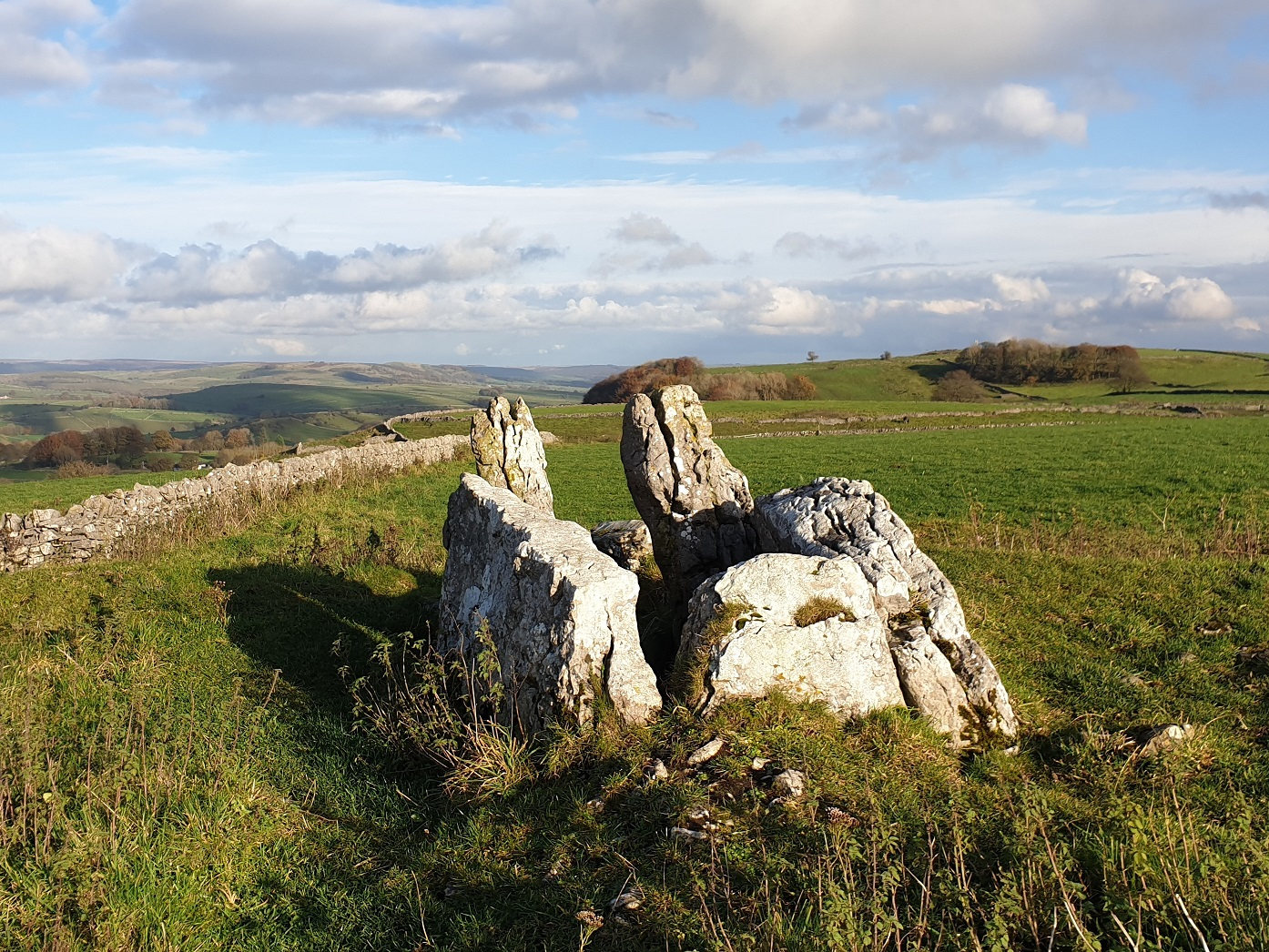
Five Wells chambered tomb

Five Wells is a Neolithic chambered tomb on Taddington Moor and it is a protected scheduled ancient monument. It was first excavated by the local archaeologist Thomas Bateman in 1846. He discovered the remains of at least twelve human skeletons in the stone-paved chambers.

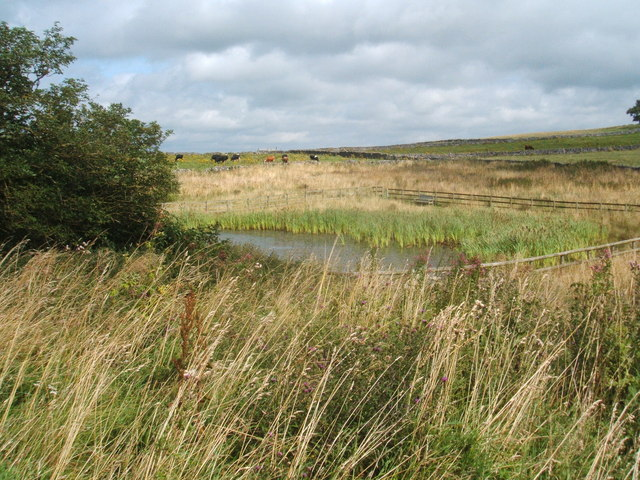
Taddington High Mere

Taddington High Mere (on the edge of the moor south of Taddington village) is an ancient pond, formed during the Ice Age. It is a scarce water source on the White Peak limestone plateau. It was recorded in 1690 by John Orme as 'the great pond or meare called Taddington high Meare'. The ancient packhorse track Oriss Road passed the mere. In 2004 the mere was restored by volunteers from Taddington village with funding from the Countryside Agency.

The Pennine Bridleway and Midshires Way trails follow the same route north–south across the moor to the east of Chelmorton and Calton Hill. The Limestone Way long-distance footpath also runs north–south across the moor between Flagg and the Waterloo pub on the A6 road.
