= William Page (cricketer) =

English cricketer

Personal information
- Full name: William Page
- Born: 29 April 1847; Caverswall. Staffordshire, England
- Died: 27 September 1904 (aged 57); Rose Hill, Derby, England
- Batting: Right-handed

Domestic team information
- Years: Team
- 1881–1882: Derbyshire
- FC debut: 27 June 1881 Derbyshire v Lancashire
- Last FC: 1 June 1882 Derbyshire v Yorkshire

Career statistics
Competition	First-class
Matches	3
Runs scored	50
Batting average	8.33
100s/50s	0/0
Top score	19
Catches/stumpings	0/–
- Source: CricketArchive, 20 June 2011

William Page (29 April 1847 – 27 September 1904) was an English cricketer who played for Derbyshire in 1881 and 1882.

Page was born in Caverswall, Staffordshire the son of Samuel Page, a platelayer, and his wife Phoebe. He was a boilermaker and in 1881 was widowed with two children. He first played for Derbyshire in the 1881 season in June against Lancashire opening in the first innings but being out for a duck. He moved down the batting order in the second innings and made 9 which was the second highest score in the innings. In the 1882 season he made 19 in a match against Marylebone Cricket Club which Derbyshire lost by a large margin. In his next and final match against Yorkshire he was out for a duck in the first innings but was joint-highest scorer in the second innings with 14 before being bowled by England Test cricketer Billy Bates. Page was a right-handed batsman who played 6 innings in 3 matches at an average of 8.33 and a top score of 19.

Page's cricketing career came to a premature end in 1882, when he lost his sight in one eye.

Page died in Rose Hill, Derby at the age of 57.
