= Henry Evans (English cricketer) =

English cricketer (1857–1920)

Personal information
- Born: 8 July 1857; Stoneyford, Derbyshire, England
- Died: 30 July 1920 (aged 63); Spondon, Derbyshire, England
- Batting: Right-handed
- Bowling: Right-arm medium-fast
- Relatives: Thomas Evans (brother)

Domestic team information
- Years: Team
- 1878–1882: Derbyshire
- FC debut: 27 May 1878 Derbyshire v Yorkshire
- Last FC: 12 June 1882 Derbyshire v Australians

Career statistics
Competition	First-class
Matches	5
Runs scored	41
Batting average	4.10
100s/50s	0/0
Top score	10
Balls bowled	556
Wickets	19
Bowling average	13.26
5 wickets in innings	2
10 wickets in match	0
Best bowling	7/47
Catches/stumpings	4/–
- Source: CricketArchive, 25 January 2011

Henry Evans (8 July 1857 – 30 July 1920) was an English cricketer who played for Derbyshire between 1878 and 1882.

Evans was born in Stoneyford (near Heanor), Derbyshire the son of Thomas Evans, a farmer. He became a clerk with the Midland Railway.

Evans made his first-class debut for Derbyshire in the 1878 season against Yorkshire. He next played three matches during the 1881 season. In the 1882 season he played one further first-class match, against the touring Australian team.

Evans was a right-arm medium-fast bowler and took 19 wickets at an average of 13.26 and had a best performance of 7-47. He was a right-handed middle order batsman and played 10 innings in 5 matches. His top score was 10 and his average 4.10.

In 1888 Evans moved to Glasgow, as an assistant traffic manager for a railway company. He died in Spondon.

His brother Thomas Evans, played for Derbyshire during the 1883 season.
