= Thomas Evans (cricketer) =

English cricketer

Personal information
- Full name: Thomas Evans
- Born: 3 June 1852; Stoneyford, Derbyshire, England
- Died: 2 December 1916 (aged 64); Heaton Moor, Lancashire, England
- Batting: Right-handed
- Bowling: Right-arm slow-medium
- Relatives: Henry Evans (brother)

Domestic team information
- Years: Team
- 1883: Derbyshire
- FC debut: 9 July 1883 Derbyshire v MCC
- Last FC: 15 July 1889 Liverpool and District v Nottinghamshire

Career statistics
Competition	First-class
Matches	4
Runs scored	91
Batting average	13.00
100s/50s	0/0
Top score	35
Balls bowled	447
Wickets	6
Bowling average	25.00
5 wickets in innings	0
10 wickets in match	0
Best bowling	2/27
Catches/stumpings	2/–
- Source: CricketArchive, 26 August 2011

Thomas Evans (3 June 1852 – 2 December 1916) was an English first-class cricketer who played for Derbyshire in 1883.

Evans was born in Stoneyford, Derbyshire. He made his debut for Derbyshire in the 1883 season in the year after his brother Henry Evans stopped playing for the club. His first match was against the Marylebone Cricket Club (MCC). He played one more match for Derbyshire, but from his two games achieved the top batting average for the club in the season.

During the 1880s Thomas played Football for Everton FC and later became the club secretary.

Evans later played for Liverpool and District. He played during a Canadian tour of England in 1887 and took eleven wickets in the match. He played two first-class matches for Liverpool and District, his last in 1889 against Nottinghamshire.

Evans was a right-handed batsman and played four first-class matches with an average of 13.00 and a top score of 35. He was a right-arm slow-medium bowler and took 6 first-class wickets at an average of 25.00 and a best performance of 2 for 27.

Evans died in Heaton Moor, Lancashire.
