= Edward Evershed =

English cricketer

Personal information
- Full name: Edward Evershed
- Born: 3 November 1867; Stapenhill, Derbyshire, England
- Died: 16 February 1957 (aged 89); Handsworth Wood, England
- Batting: Right-handed
- Role: Wicket-keeper
- Relatives: Sydney Evershed (father); Sydney Evershed (brother); Wallis Evershed (brother); Frank Evershed (brother); Geoffrey Bell (cousin)

Domestic team information
- Years: Team
- 1888–1898: Derbyshire
- Only FC: 16 June 1898 Derbyshire v Warwickshire

Career statistics
Competition	First-class
Matches	1
Runs scored	1
Batting average	1.00
100s/50s	0/0
Top score	1
Catches/stumpings	2/–
- Source: CricketArchive, February 2012

Edward Evershed (3 November 1867 – 18 February 1957) was an English cricketer who played for Derbyshire between 1888 and 1898.

== Life ==
Evershed was born in Stapenhill, now part of Burton-upon-Trent, Staffordshire (then in Derbyshire), the son of Sydney Evershed the brewer and MP for Burton. In 1888, Evershed played non first-class matches for an Oxford University team and for Marylebone Cricket Club (MCC) and then regularly for Derbyshire while they were without first-class status until 1893.

Evershed made one first-class appearance for Derbyshire in 1898, as wicketkeeper against Warwickshire. During the season a number of players kept wicket instead of the regular William Storer who still took part in the matches. Evershed batted during the first innings, but did not make a contribution during the second, as the match petered out to a draw.

Evershed was a right-handed batsman and a wicket-keeper, and made one run in the first-class game.

Evershed was the co-founder, with Francis Martin Tomkinson, of Evershed and Tomkinson, the Birmingham firm of solicitors, in 1914. His name has been retained during the course of numerous mergers which have led to the firm of Evershed Sutherland, one of the largest law firms in the world. The extraordinary story of the development of the firm is described in A Global Journey, published by the firm in 2017.

Evershed died in Handsworth Wood. His brothers, Sydney, Wallis, and Frank, and cousin Geoffrey Bell, all played first-class cricket, while William Evershed also played first-class cricket in first half of the 19th century.
