= Conrad Wallroth =

English cricketer

Personal information
- Full name: Conrad Adolphus Wallroth
- Born: 12 May 1851; Lee, Kent
- Died: 22 February 1926 (aged 74); Godalming, Surrey
- Batting: Right-handed
- Role: Occasional wicket-keeper

Domestic team information
- Years: Team
- 1872–1874: Oxford University
- 1872: Kent
- 1879: Derbyshire
- FC debut: 25 May 1871 Marylebone Cricket Club (MCC) v Oxford University
- Last FC: 4 August 1879 Derbyshire v Yorkshire

Career statistics
Competition	First-class
Matches	21
Runs scored	596
Batting average	17.02
100s/50s	1/0
Top score	109
Catches/stumpings	8/–
- Source: CricInfo, 25 January 2011

Conrad Adolphus Wallroth (12 May 1851 – 22 February 1926) was an English cricketer who played first-class cricket for Oxford University between 1872 and 1874, Kent in 1872 and Derbyshire in 1879. He was a right-handed batsman who occasionally kept wicket.

Wallroth was born in Lee, then in Kent. He was educated at Harrow School, playing in the Eton-Harrow match in 1870, and went on to study at Brasenose College, Oxford. In 1871 he made his first-class debut playing against Oxford University for Marylebone Cricket Club (MCC), and also played for Brasenose College and Gentlemen of England that season. In the 1872 season he played for the Oxford University team including in the Varsity match, and at the end of the season put in an appearance for Kent. He played for Oxford University in 1873, when he scored 109 against Middlesex, and was in the winning Varsity match team. Oxford won the Varsity match again in 1874, which was Wallroth's last season. In 1876 he appeared for the Gentlemen of the South, and by 1878 had moved to Derbyshire where he lived at Mickleover. He played a non-qualifying match against Uppingham for Derbyshire in 1878 and played three first-class games for Derbyshire in the 1879 season. He also played a number of games that year for the Harrow School old boys team, one of which was a win against Derbyshire. In 1880 he played a game for Gentlemen of Derbyshire against Gentlemen of Canada.

Wallroth, died at Compton Grange Godalming, Surrey at the age of 74. Wallroth's sister Louisa married Alfred Lubbock a Kent cricketer.

== Bibliography ==
- Carlaw, Derek (2020). Kent County Cricketers, A to Z: Part One (1806–1914) (PDF). Cardiff: ACS.
