= George Osborne (cricketer) =

English cricketer

Cricket information
- Batting: Right-handed

Domestic team information
- Years: Team
- 1879–1883: Derbyshire
- FC debut: 6 September 1877 Players of the North v Gentlemen of the North
- Last FC: 17 May 1883 Derbyshire v Lancashire

Career statistics
Competition	First-class
Matches	8
Runs scored	60
Batting average	4,38
100s/50s	0/0
Top score	60
Balls bowled	68
Wickets	1
Bowling average	39.00
5 wickets in innings	0
10 wickets in match	0
Best bowling	1/23
Catches/stumpings	3/–
- Source: CricketArchive, 2 February 2011

George Osborne was an English cricketer who played for Derbyshire between 1879 and 1883.

Osborne played cricket at club level for Chesterfield and made his debut first-class appearance in a Gentlemen v. Players match in 1877, on the winning Players side. He joined Derbyshire in the 1879 season and played for the Derbyshire Colts in June. Shortly after, he made his first-class debut for Derbyshire against Lancashire. Osborne made 9 not out in the second innings and played three further matches during the season, picking up his career high score of 14 against Yorkshire. In the 1881 season he appeared in two games which were against Marylebone Cricket Club and Lancashire. In the 1883 season he played one game against Lancashire with an indifferent performance.

Osborne played 15 innings in 8 first-class matches with an average of 4.28 and a top score of 14. He took 1 wicket at an average of 39.00.

At the time of the 1881 census, the only individual of this name living near Chesterfield was a colliery banksman aged 26 born in Shelsfield Kent. He was living with a wife and son at Clowne.
