= Henry Sugden =

English cricketer and brewer

Personal information
- Full name: Henry Emanuel Sugden
- Born: 16 July 1859; Southgate, Middlesex, England
- Died: 4 September 1935 (aged 76); Chilworth, Hampshire, England
- Batting: Right-handed

Domestic team information
- Years: Team
- 1882: Derbyshire
- FC debut: 12 June 1882 Derbyshire v Australians
- Last FC: 26 June 1882 Derbyshire v Lancashire

Career statistics
Competition	First-class
Matches	2
Runs scored	13
Batting average	3.25
100s/50s	0/0
Top score	9
Catches/stumpings	0/–
- Source: CricketArchive, 23 June 2011

Henry Emanuel Sugden (16 July 1859 – 4 September 1935) was an English cricketer who played for Derbyshire in 1882.

Sugden was born in Southgate, Middlesex and moved to Burton-on-Trent, Staffordshire where he was a brewer.

Sugden made his debut for Derbyshire in the 1882 season in June against a team of touring Australians. The team consisted of eleven past and future Australia Test cricketers, including Frederick Spofforth and Alec Bannerman. Australia won the match by an innings margin, while Sugden made little impression from the opening order, being bowled in the first innings and being out hit wicket off the bowling of Harry Boyle in the second. Sugden made just one further first-class appearance, against Lancashire two weeks later, scoring a duck in his first innings and dropping down the order in the second.

Sugden was a right-handed batsman and played four innings in two first-class matches, with a top score of 9 and a batting average of 3.25.

Sugden died in Chilworth, Hampshire at the age of 76.
