= Listed buildings in Taddington =

Taddington is a civil parish in the Derbyshire Dales district of Derbyshire, England. The parish contains 13 listed buildings that are recorded in the National Heritage List for England. Of these, one is listed at Grade I, the highest of the three grades, and the others are at Grade II, the lowest grade. The parish contains the village of Taddington and the surrounding countryside. Most of the listed buildings are farmhouses and farm buildings, and the others consist of a house, a church, three mileposts, a railway viaduct, and a row of lime kilns.

== Key ==
Grade	Criteria
I	Buildings of exceptional interest, sometimes considered to be internationally important
II	Buildings of national importance and special interest

== Buildings ==
Name and location	Photograph	Date	Notes	Grade
St Michael's Church; 53.23728°N 1.78978°W		Early 14th century	The oldest part of the church is the steeple, the rest of the church has been altered and extended through the centuries, it was restored in 1891–92 by Naylor and Sale, and the vestry was added in 1940. The steeple is in gritstone, the body of the church is in limestone with gritstone dressings, the porch has a stone slate roof, and the rest of the roofs are in lead. The church consists of a nave with a clerestory, north and south aisles, a south porch, a chancel with a north vestry, and a west steeple. The steeple has a tower with ogee-headed lights to the west, a clock face to the south, two-light bell openings with ogee-headed lights, and a broach spire with two tiers of lucarnes. The east window has five lights with Decorated tracery.	I
Fold Farmhouse; 53.23504°N 1.78316°W	—	Mid 17th century	The farmhouse is in limestone with gritstone dressings and a stone slate roof. There are two storeys and an irregular front of two bays. The windows have recessed and chamfered surrounds, and were originally mullioned, with only one mullion remaining.	II
Sycamore Farmhouse and barn 53.23648°N 1.78716°W	—	Mid 18th century	The farmhouse and barn are in limestone with gritstone dressings and quoins, the farmhouse has a stone slate roof and the barn roof is in corrugated asbestos. There are two storeys and a T-shaped plan. The house has two bays, a central doorway with a quoined surround and a massive lintel, and the windows are mullioned with two lights. The barn at right angles to the left has two square openings facing the road, and on the west front are three recessed and chamfered openings and projecting stones.	II
Taddington Field Farmhouse; 53.23176°N 1.76063°W	—	18th century	The farmhouse, which was extended in 1839, is in limestone with gritstone dressings, quoins, and tile roofs. There are two storeys, an L-shaped plan with a south front of four bays, the left two bays from the original house, and the right two bays from the larger addition. The earlier part has a central doorway with massive stone jambs and a lintel, mullioned windows, and a hood mould over the ground floor openings. In the return wall is a doorway with a moulded surround, a rectangular fanlight, and a bracketed hood, and the windows in the addition are sashes.	II
Taddington Hall; 53.23600°N 1.78240°W	—	18th century	A house in limestone with gritstone dressings, partly rendered, on a chamfered plinth, with quoins, a moulded eaves band, and a stone slate roof with coped gables and kneelers On the east front is a coped parapet with banded ball finials. There are two storeys and six bays. On the front is a projecting square porch with a hipped roof and banded ball finials. Above the porch is a Venetian window with a raised keystone, and the other windows are sashes.	II
Home Farmhouse; 53.23618°N 1.78307°W	—	Late 18th century	The farmhouse is in limestone with gritstone dressings and a stone slate roof. There are two storeys and three bays. The central doorway has a stone lintel and jambs, the window above the doorway has a single light, and the other windows are mullioned with two lights.	II
Highcliffe Farmhouse and barn 53.24323°N 1.80397°W		1811	The farmhouse and barn are in limestone with gritstone dressings and roofs of Welsh slate and tile. The farmhouse has two storeys, a double range plan, and a front of two bays. The central doorway has a quoined surround and a dated lintel, and the windows are mullioned with two lights. The barn attached to the left contains a segmental-arched cart entrance, doorways and square openings, and there are external steps to an upper doorway.	II
Mile Post at OS 143 711; 53.23638°N 1.78741°W		Early 19th century	The milepost on the south side of Main Road is in cast iron. It has a circular shaft and a broader circular body, with raised bead moulding and a domed top. On the top is inscribed the distance to London, and on the side the distance to Bakewell.	II
Mile post at OS 158 714; 53.23943°N 1.76482°W	—	Early 19th century	The milepost on the south side of the A6 road is in cast iron. It has a circular shaft and a broader circular body, with raised bead moulding and a domed top. On the top is inscribed the distance to London, and the other distances are illegible.	II
Mile post at OS 169 707; 53.23303°N 1.74834°W		Early 19th century	The milepost on the south side of the A6 road is in cast iron. It has a circular shaft and a broader circular body, with raised bead moulding and a domed top. On the top is inscribed the distance to London, and the other distances are illegible.	II
Rose Farmhouse and railings 53.24468°N 1.79378°W	—	Early 19th century	The farmhouse is in limestone with gritstone dressings and a Welsh slate roof. There are two storeys and four bays. On the front are two doorways with a stone lintel and jambs, and a bracketed hood. The windows either have a single light or are mullioned, and along the front of the house are iron railings with intersecting ovals.	II
Lime kilns 53.25433°N 1.78965°W		1878	The lime kilns are in limestone, and are about 30 feet (9.1 m) tall. Buttresses were added in 1923, and on the north side are four round-arched openings.	II
North Viaduct; 53.25588°N 1.79191°W		1905	The viaduct was built by the Midland Railway to carry its line over the River Wye and the B6049 road. The piers and abutments of the four west arches are in gritstone with Staffordshire blue brick round the arches. To the east are three steel spans, with two parallel girders to each span. The parapet is in latticework.	II
