= Humphrey Forman =

English cricketer (1888–1923)

Personal information
- Full name: Humphrey Forman
- Born: 26 April 1888; Repton, Derbyshire, England
- Died: 21 May 1923 (aged 35); Bangkok, Thailand
- Bowling: Left-arm medium
- Relatives: Arthur Forman (father)

Domestic team information
- Years: Team
- 1910: Cambridge University
- 1910: Somerset

Career statistics
Competition	First-class
Matches	2
Runs scored	13
Batting average	3.25
100s/50s	0/0
Top score	8
Balls bowled	201
Wickets	5
Bowling average	31.80
5 wickets in innings	0
10 wickets in match	0
Best bowling	4/62
Catches/stumpings	0/–
- Source: CricketArchive, 22 December 2015

Humphrey Forman (26 April 1888 – 21 May 1923) played first-class cricket in two matches, one each for Cambridge University and Somerset in the 1910 cricket season. He was born at Repton, Derbyshire and died at Bangkok in Thailand.

Humphrey Forman was the son of Arthur Forman, a master at Repton School and himself a first-class cricketer for Derbyshire County Cricket Club. Humphrey was educated at Shrewsbury School. As a first-class cricketer, he was a lower-order batsman and a left-arm medium-pace bowler. He was quite successful as a bowler in his one first-class match at Cambridge University, taking four Kent wickets for 62 runs, more wickets than any other Cambridge bowler. He played a second match for Cambridge a week later against the Free Foresters; this match was not classed as first-class (though many such fixtures between these teams were in other years), but in any case Forman was not successful. In his solitary match for Somerset later in the same season, he opened the bowling but took only one wicket in the match.
