= Wallis Evershed =

English cricketer

Personal information
- Born: 10 May 1863; Stapenhill, Derbyshire, England
- Died: 8 May 1911 (aged 47); Kendal, England
- Batting: Right-handed
- Bowling: Right-arm medium
- Relatives: Sydney Evershed (father); Sydney Evershed (brother); Edward Evershed (brother); Frank Evershed (brother); Geoffrey Bell (cousin)

Domestic team information
- Years: Team
- 1882–1884: Derbyshire
- FC debut: 27 July 1882 Derbyshire v Sussex
- Last FC: 11 August 1884 Derbyshire v Sussex

Career statistics
Competition	First-class
Matches	13
Runs scored	357
Batting average	14.87
100s/50s	0/3
Top score	92
Balls bowled	27
Wickets	3
Bowling average	2.66
5 wickets in innings	0
10 wickets in match	0
Best bowling	3/8
Catches/stumpings	6/–
- Source: CricketArchive, 18 July 2010

Wallis Evershed (10 May 1863 – 8 May 1911) was an English cricketer who played for Derbyshire between 1882 and 1884.

== Early life and education ==
Evershed was born in Stapenhill, the son of Sydney Evershed the brewer and MP for Burton. He was educated at Clifton College where he was awarded his cap (for rugby) and was captain of the XI in 1882.

== Career ==
Evershed made his first-class debut for Derbyshire in an innings victory against Sussex in July 1882, when he scored 19 runs in Derbyshire's innings. He made one further appearance during the 1882 season, in a defeat by Yorkshire.

Evershed made eight appearances in the 1883 season, playing in all Derbyshire's County matches and twice against Marylebone Cricket Club (MCC). He scored each of his three half-century innings during this season, including his career highest score of 92, achieved against Surrey. In this match, he and team-mate Edmund Maynard put on over fifty per cent of the innings total, in separate batting partnerships. He ended the season with the most runs scored for the club. In the 1884 season, he only played one match for the club against Sussex, which was his last.

Evershed was a right-handed batsman and played 24 innings in 13 first-class matches with an average of 14.87 and a top score of 92. He was a right-arm medium-pace bowler and in 27 balls took three wickets for eight runs.

== Death and legacy ==
Evershed died in Kendal two days short of his 48th birthday. His brothers, Edward, Sydney, Frank, and cousin Geoffrey Bell were all first-class cricketers, while William Evershed also played first-class cricket in first half of the 19th century.
