= George Earl (cricketer) =

English cricketer (1859–1933)

Personal information
- Full name: George Burrill Earl
- Born: 7 August 1859; Melbourne, Derbyshire, England
- Died: 20 April 1933 (aged 73); Melbourne, Derbyshire, England
- Batting: Right-handed
- Bowling: Right-arm medium-fast

Domestic team information
- Years: Team
- 1883–1888: Derbyshire
- Only FC: 9 July 1883 Derbyshire v MCC

Career statistics
Competition	First-class
Matches	1
Runs scored	4
Batting average	4.00
100s/50s	0/0
Top score	4
Catches/stumpings	1/–
- Source: CricketArchive, 17 July 2011

George Burrill Earl (7 August 1859 – 20 April 1933), born George Burrill Earle, was an English cricketer who played for Derbyshire in 1883 and 1888.

Earl was born in Melbourne, Derbyshire and worked as a "boot clicker" - that is working a machine to make lace holes in boot uppers.

Earl played in one first-class match during the 1883 season, though in the one innings he played, he was caught out quickly and put lower down the order. He played two further matches for the club in the 1888 season, when the club's matches were not accorded first-class status. He was a right-handed batsman and a right-arm medium-fast bowler.

Earl died at Melbourne at the age of 73.
