= Leonard Jackson (cricketer) =

English cricketer (1848–1887)

Personal information
- Born: 8 April 1848; Norton Woodseats, England
- Died: 21 March 1887 (aged 38); Sheffield, England
- Batting: Right-handed
- Bowling: Right-arm fast

Domestic team information
- Years: Team
- 1877–1882: Derbyshire
- FC debut: 2 September 1875 North v South
- Last FC: 18 May 1882 Derbyshire v MCC

Career statistics
| Competition | First-class |
|---|---|
| Matches | 6 |
| Runs scored | 109 |
| Batting average | 9.90 |
| 100s/50s | 0/0 |
| Top score | 28 |
| Balls bowled | 459 |
| Wickets | 10 |
| Bowling average | 19.80 |
| 5 wickets in innings | 0 |
| 10 wickets in match | 0 |
| Best bowling | 3/9 |
| Catches/stumpings | 4/– |
- Source: CricketArchive, 20 January 2011

Leonard Jackson (8 April 1848 – 21 March 1887) was an English cricketer who played for Derbyshire from 1877 to 1882.

Jackson was born at Holme Hurst in Norton Woodseats, on the border of Yorkshire and Derbyshire. He first played cricket professionally in 1869, for the Breckfield Club in Liverpool. He then went to live in Sheffield where he was a metal-grinder and was playing at Wakefield in 1872 and 1873. In 1874 he appeared for Grimsby against an All England XI and then started playing for Hull Town Club. In 1875, he appeared in a first-class North of England/South of England fixture which took place at the Hull ground, as a last-minute replacement for McIntyre. He later moved to Hull where he was landlord of the Land of Green Ginger Hotel. Later he took Crown and Cushion Hotel.

Jackson's debut for Derbyshire came in the 1877 season, when he played for Derbyshire against Marylebone Cricket Club. He made two more County appearances for Derbyshire that year. In 1878 he played for Hull against the Australians, in 1879 for Roger Iddison's XI and again in 1880 for Hull against the Australians. He played for Derbyshire for one match in the 1881 season, and then again in the 1882 season.

Jackson was a right-handed batsman and played 12 innings in 6 first-class matches, with a top score of 28 and an average of 9.90. He was a right-arm roundarm fast bowler who took 10 first-class wickets with an average of 19,80 and a best performance of 3–9.

At the end of his cricketing career, Jackson focused on his hotel business and metal-grinding as his main occupations for the five years until his death in Sheffield aged 39.
