= Sydney Evershed (brewer) =

British brewer & politician (1825 – 1903)

Member of Parliament for Burton
- In office 1886–1900
- Preceded by: Michael Bass, 1st Baron Burton
- Succeeded by: Robert Ratcliff

Personal details
- Born: 5 September 1825 Albury, Surrey, England
- Died: 7 November 1903 (aged 78) Marylebone, England
- Party: Liberal
- Spouse: Fanny Whitehead (m. 1856)
- Children: Sydney Evershed, Wallis Evershed, Frank Evershed, Edward Evershed
- Occupation: Brewer, Politician

Sydney Evershed

Sydney Evershed (5 September 1825 – 7 November 1903) was an English brewer and Liberal Party politician who represented Burton.

Evershed's family came from Albury in Surrey. By 1860 he had moved to Burton-on-Trent, and became a Burton brewer. He lived at Stapenhill, where he built Albury House, named after his birthplace. Evershed was active in local politics and was one of the Improvement Commissioners, and one of the first councillors when Burton was incorporated as a borough in 1878. In 1886, he was elected as Member of Parliament for Burton which he held until 1900. He died at Marylebone in 1903.

Evershed married Fanny Whitehead at Marylebone in 1856. Their sons Sydney, Wallis, Frank and Edward all played cricket for Derbyshire. Fanny died in 1904. In 1909 his brewery merged with Marston and Thompson to become Marston, Thompson and Evershed.

Parliament of the United Kingdom
Preceded by Michael Bass, 1st Baron Burton	Member of Parliament for Burton; 1886–1900	Succeeded by Robert Ratcliff
