= Raymond Evershed, 1st Baron Evershed =

British judge (1899–1966)

The Right Honourable The Lord Evershed PC
- Evershed in 1944

Lord of Appeal in Ordinary
- In office 19 April 1962 – 10 January 1965
- Preceded by: The Viscount Simonds
- Succeeded by: The Lord Pearson

Master of the Rolls
- In office 1 June 1949 – 19 April 1962
- Preceded by: The Lord Greene
- Succeeded by: The Lord Denning

Personal details
- Born: Francis Raymond Evershed; 8 August 1899 Stapenhill, Burton upon Trent
- Died: 3 October 1966 (aged 67) St Andrews Hospital, Northampton
- Spouse: Cecily Elizabeth Joan Bennett
- Education: Balliol College, Oxford
- Profession: Barrister, Judge

Francis Raymond Evershed, 1st Baron Evershed, PC (8 August 1899 – 3 October 1966) was a British judge who served as Master of the Rolls, and subsequently became a Law Lord.

== Background and education ==
Evershed was the son of Frank Evershed, a brewer and sportsman, and his wife Florence Helen, daughter of Thomas Lowe. He was educated at Clifton College and Balliol College, Oxford. During the First World War he was a Second Lieutenant in the Royal Engineers. In January 1923, he was called to the bar by Lincoln's Inn. He then practiced at the Chancery bar.

== Legal and judicial career ==
Evershed was made a K.C. in 1933 and a Bencher of Lincoln's Inn in 1938. He became a High Court Judge in 1944 when he was knighted, and Lord Justice of Appeal in 1947, when he was also made a Privy Counsellor. Between 1949 and 1962, he was Master of the Rolls and served as the U.K. Member of the Permanent Court of Arbitration at The Hague in 1950.

He was raised to the peerage as Baron Evershed, of Stapenhill in the County of Derby, on 20 January 1956. In 1962, he was made a Lord of Appeal in Ordinary, and was succeeded as Master of the Rolls by Lord Denning. He retired in 1965.

== Personal life ==
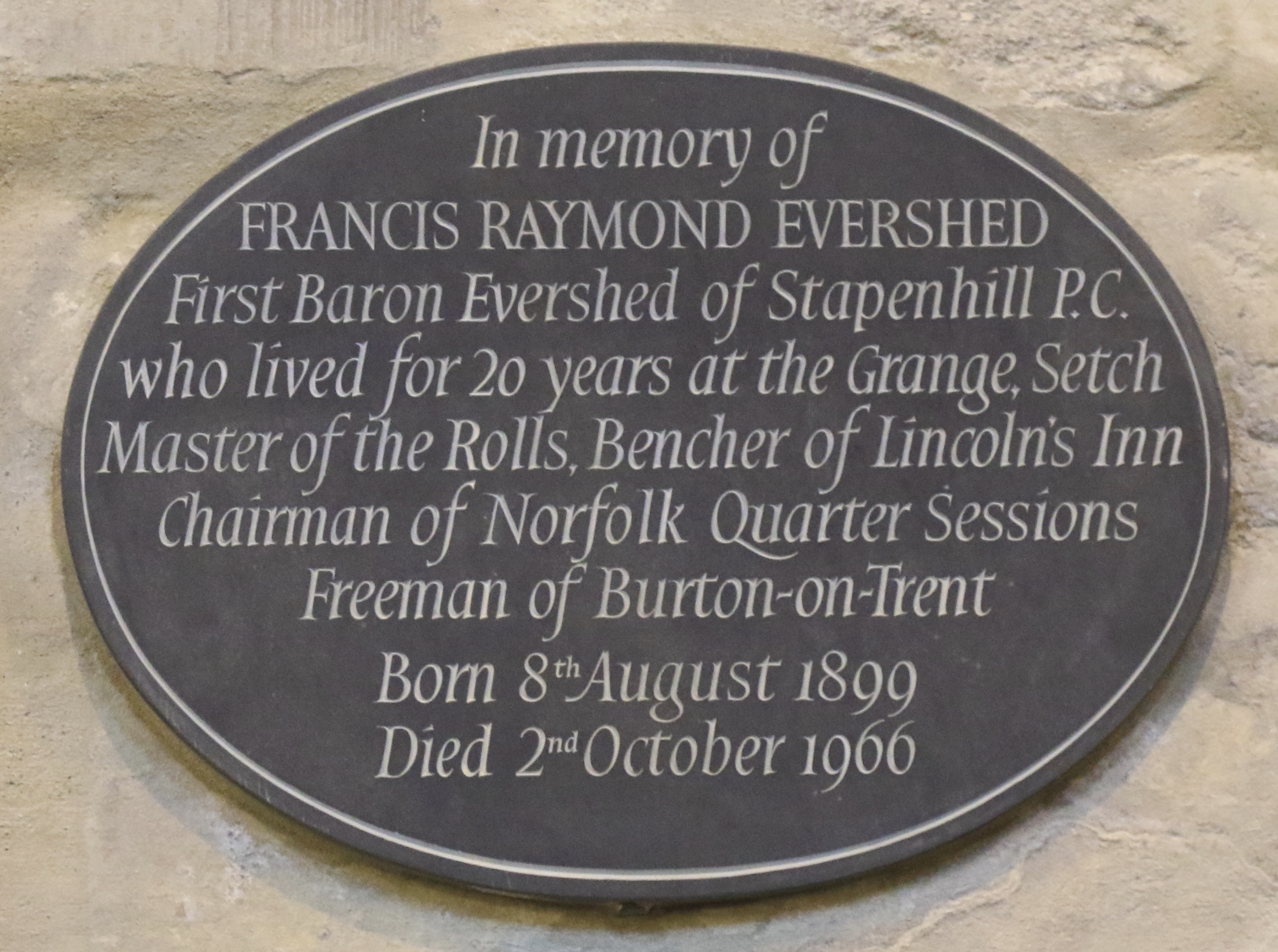
Memorial in King's Lynn Minster

Lord Evershed married Cecily Elizabeth Joan, daughter of Sir Charles Alan Bennett, in 1928. The title became extinct on his death in October 1966, aged 67.

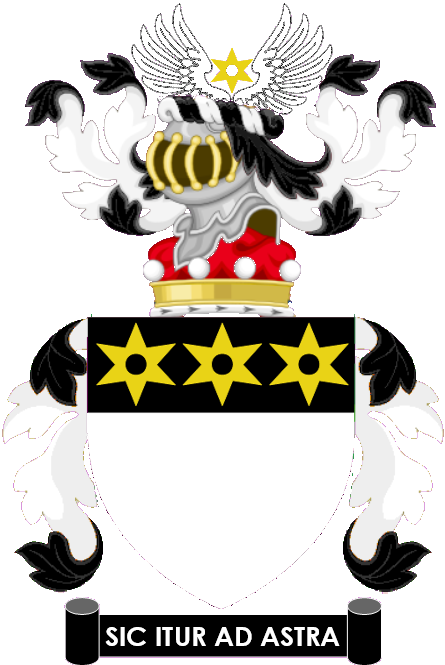
Arms as displayed at Lincoln's Inn

Legal offices
Preceded by The Lord Greene	Master of the Rolls; 1949–1962	Succeeded by The Lord Denning
Peerage of the United Kingdom
New creation	Baron Evershed; 1956–1966	Extinct
