= Ralph Docker =

English cricketer

Personal information
- Born: 31 August 1855; Harborne. Staffordshire, England
- Died: 7 July 1910 (aged 54); Tunbridge Wells, Kent, England
- Batting: Right-handed
- Relatives: Frank Dudley Docker (brother); Ludford Docker (brother)

Domestic team information
- Years: Team
- 1879: Derbyshire
- FC debut: 26 May 1879 Derbyshire v MCC
- Last FC: 5 June 1879 Derbyshire v Lancashire

Career statistics
Competition	First-class
Matches	2
Runs scored	9
Batting average	2.25
100s/50s	0/0
Top score	6
Catches/stumpings	2/–
- Source: CricketArchive, 2 February 2011

Ralph Docker (31 August 1855 — 7 July 1910) was an English cricketer who played first-class cricket for Derbyshire in 1879.

Docker was born in Harborne, Staffordshire, the son of Ralph Docker and his wife Sarah Sankey. His father was a solicitor in practice at Birmingham and Smethwick who took on a large number of public appointments. He was educated at King Edward's School, Birmingham. In 1873 he played for a Birmingham XXII against an All England XI, and then in 1878 in another Birmingham XXII against an Australian team.

Docker played two matches for Derbyshire in the 1879 season making his debut against Marylebone Cricket Club in May 1879, as an opening batsman, and played his first and only county match two weeks later, moving down the order to face Lancashire. He made a total of 9 runs in his four first-class innings. Later in the season he played again for Birmingham. In 1880 he played a game for Staffordshire, and in 1883 and 1885 one game each year for Warwickshire which was before the club had first-class status. His last match against touring Parsees was for Gentlemen of Warwickshire in 1888.

Docker died in Tunbridge Wells aged 55. Docker had two younger brothers Frank Dudley Docker and Ludford Docker who managed the industrial and financial concern Docker Brothers and who also played cricket for Derbyshire, Ludford being club captain.
