= John Richardson (Derbyshire cricketer) =

English cricketer

Personal information
- Full name: John Richardson
- Born: 17 March 1856; Duckmanton, Derbyshire, England
- Died: 19 February 1940 (aged 83); Brimington, Derbyshire, England
- Batting: Right-handed
- Bowling: Right-arm fast

Domestic team information
- Years: Team
- 1878–1883: Derbyshire
- FC debut: 1 July 1878 Derbyshire v All England Eleven
- Last FC: 6 August 1883 Derbyshire v Yorkshire

Career statistics
Competition	First-class
Matches	11
Runs scored	117
Batting average	6.88
100s/50s	0/0
Top score	18
Balls bowled	1,168
Wickets	32
Bowling average	16.15
5 wickets in innings	1
10 wickets in match	0
Best bowling	7/76
Catches/stumpings	9/–
- Source: CricketArchive, 25 January 2011

John Richardson (17 March 1856 – 19 February 1940) was an English cricketer who played for Derbyshire between 1878 and 1883.

Richardson was born in Duckmanton, Derbyshire and became a bricklayer. His first-class career for Derbyshire began in the 1878 season in a game against the All England Eleven, a match in which he took two wickets for the team, although his batting contribution, being caught for a duck in the first innings and finishing not-out for 0 in the second, was minimal. He played minor games for Derbyshire in 1878 and 1879. In the 1882 season Richardson played his first County match, against Lancashire. He took at least a wicket in every match he played in the 1882 season. Derbyshire dispensed with the idea of using just two bowlers, most frequently William Mycroft and John Platts at that time, and in his final game of the 1882 season against Yorkshire Richardson achieved his best bowling performance of 7–76. He also made his top score of 18.

In the 1883 season Richardson took at least one wicket in every innings except one, although with frequent follow-ons there was often only one chance to bowl. His batting contribution remained low.

Richardson was a right-arm fast bowler and took 32 first-class wickets at an average of 16.15 and a best performance of 7–76. He was a right-handed batsman who played 21 innings in 11 first-class matches with a top score of 18 and an average of 6.88.

Richardson died in Brimington aged 83.
