= John Juniper =

English cricketer

Personal information
- Full name: John William Juniper
- Born: 6 February 1862; Southwick, Sussex, England
- Died: 20 June 1885 (aged 23); Southwick, Sussex, England
- Batting: Unknown
- Bowling: Left-arm fast

Domestic team information
- Years: Team
- 1880–1885: Sussex
- First-class debut: 14 June 1880 Sussex v Hampshire
- Last First-class: 8 June 1885 Sussex v Cambridge University

Career statistics
Competition	First-class
Matches	57
Runs scored	490
Batting average	6.71
100s/50s	–/–
Top score	31
Balls bowled	9,906
Wickets	184
Bowling average	19.69
5 wickets in innings	6
10 wickets in match	–
Best bowling	7/24
Catches/stumpings	20/–
- Source: CricketArchive, February 2012

John William Juniper (6 February 1862 – 20 June 1885) was an English cricketer who played for Sussex from 1880 to 1885.

Juniper was born at Southwick, West Sussex and was a labourer. He made his debut for Sussex at the age of 18 in June 1880 against Hampshire. He played for Sussex regularly for six seasons. In 1885 he caught a chill in the match against Cambridge University in 1885, which developed into typhoid fever, which resulted in his death, at Southwick, at the age of 23.

Juniper was a left-arm fast bowler and took 184 first-class wickets at an average of 19.69 and a best performance of 7 for 24. He played 97 innings in 57 first-class matches at an average of 6.71 and a top score of 31.
