= George Yates (Derbyshire cricketer) =

English cricketer

Personal information
- Born: 21 August 1858; Bolsover, Derbyshire, England
- Died: 21 July 1933 (aged 74); Bolsover, England
- Batting: Right-handed
- Bowling: Right-arm

Domestic team information
- Years: Team
- 1883: Derbyshire
- Only FC: 9 July 1883 Derbyshire v MCC

Career statistics
Competition	First-class
Matches	1
Runs scored	0
Batting average	0.00
100s/50s	0/0
Top score	0
Balls bowled	12
Wickets	0
Bowling average	–
5 wickets in innings	–
10 wickets in match	–
Best bowling	–
Catches/stumpings	0/–
- Source: CricketArchive, 2 August 2011

George Yates (21 August 1858 – 21 July 1933) was an English cricketer who played first-class cricket for Derbyshire in 1883.

Yates was born at Bolsover, Derbyshire and became a coal miner. Yates played one first-class match for Derbyshire in the 1883 season, against Marylebone Cricket Club in July, which finished in a draw. He was a right-handed batsman and scored no runs in his only first-class innings. He was a right-arm round-arm bowler and did not take a wicket in the three overs he bowled.

Yates died at Bolsover at the age of 74.
