= John Sharratt =

English cricketer (1850–1892)

Personal information
- Full name: John Sharratt
- Born: 29 October 1850; Derby, Derbyshire, England
- Died: 1892 (aged 41–42); England
- Role: Wicket-keeper

Career statistics
Competition	First-class
Matches	1
Runs scored	6
Batting average	3.00
100s/50s	/
Top score	5
Balls bowled
Wickets
Bowling average
5 wickets in innings
10 wickets in match
Best bowling
Catches/stumpings	0/2
- Source: Cricinfo, February 2011

John Sharratt (29 October 1850 – 1892) was an English cricketer who played first-class cricket for North of England in 1880.

Sharratt was born at Derby and was a railway worker. In 1879 he played two matches for Derbyshire which were not first-class status, In 1880 he played one first-class match as wicket-keeper for the North of England.

Sharratt played 2 innings in one first-class match with an average of 3.00 and a top score of five. As wicket-keeper he took two first-class wickets by stumping.

Sharratt died in the Shardlow district at the age of 41.
