= William Antliff =

English cricketer

Personal information
- Full name: William Norris Antliff
- Born: 23 August 1848; Bottesford, Leicestershire, England
- Died: 29 April 1909 (aged 60); Draycott, Derbyshire, England
- Batting: Right-handed

Domestic team information
- Years: Team
- 1880: Derbyshire
- FC debut: 17 May 1880 Derbyshire v Australians
- Last FC: 20 May 1880 Derbyshire v Lancashire

Career statistics
Competition	First-class
Matches	2
Runs scored	17
Batting average	4.25
100s/50s	0/0
Top score	5
Catches/stumpings	0/–
- Source: CricketArchive, 5 February 2011

William Norris Antliff (23 August 1848 – 29 April 1909) was an English cricketer who played first-class cricket for Derbyshire in 1880.

Antliff was born in Bottesford, Leicestershire and became a railway clerk. He played for Derbyshire Colts against the club in the 1879 season, although he was aged 30 at the time. He played two games for Derbyshire during the 1880 season. The first match was against the touring Australians in May and as it was completed in two days, the sides played an extra one innings match when Antliff made 37. His second first-class appearance was a few days later in a County match against Lancashire.

Antliff was a right-handed batsman playing in or around the opening order. He played four innings in his two first-class matches making a total of 17 runs with a best score of five.

Antliff was living in 1881 with his wife and children at Litchurch in Derby. He died in Draycott.
