= Dudley Docker =

English cricketer, businessman and philanthropist (1862–1944)

Personal information
- Full name: Frank Dudley Docker
- Born: 26 August 1862; Smethwick, Staffordshire, England
- Died: 8 July 1944 (aged 81); Amersham, Buckinghamshire, England
- Relatives: Bernard Docker (son); Norah, Lady Docker (daughter-in-law); Ludford Docker (brother); Ralph Docker (brother)

Domestic team information
- Years: Team
- 1881–1882: Derbyshire
- FC debut: 22 August 1881 Derbyshire v Yorkshire
- Last FC: 5 June 1882 Derbyshire v Surrey

Career statistics
| Competition | First-class |
|---|---|
| Matches | 2 |
| Runs scored | 33 |
| Batting average | 11.00 |
| 100s/50s | 0/0 |
| Top score | 25 |
| Catches/stumpings | 3/– |
- Source: CricketArchive, 20 June 2011

Frank Dudley Docker CB (26 August 1862 – 8 July 1944) was an English businessman and financier. He also played first-class cricket for Derbyshire in 1881 and 1882.

== Biography ==
=== Family background, early life and education ===
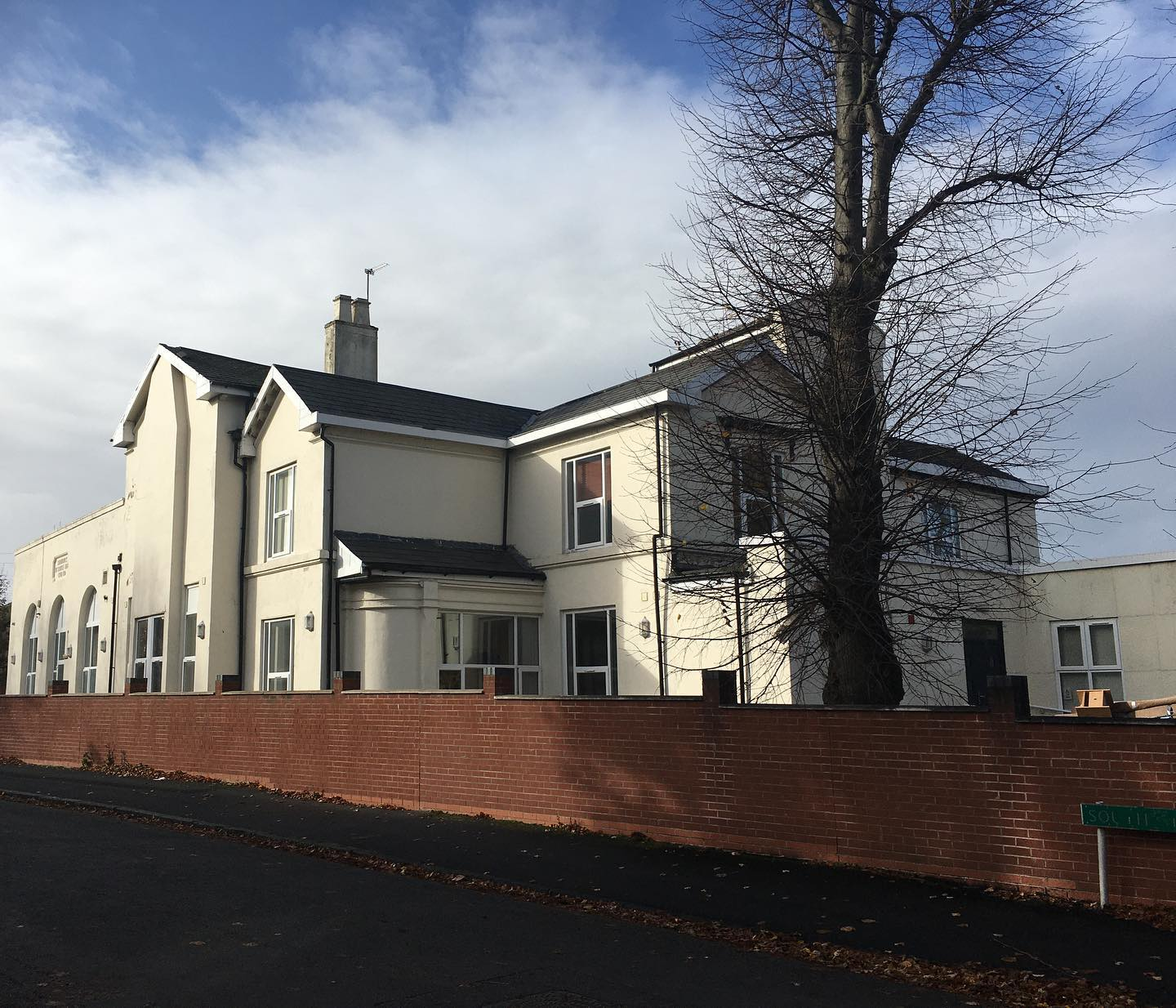
Paxton House, seen in 2020

Docker was born at Paxton House, Smethwick, Staffordshire, the son of Ralph Docker and his second wife, Sarah Maria (1830–1890), daughter of horse dealer Richard Sankey. His first wife was Sarah's elder sister, Mary Ann (1826–1849), with whom he had three daughters. Following some years as a widower, Ralph married Sarah, with whom he had five sons and four daughters. Ralph Docker was a solicitor in practice at Birmingham and Smethwick who took on a large number of public appointments, including Coroner for North Worcestershire; at the time of his retirement, two days before his death in 1887, Ralph Docker was the oldest and longest-serving Coroner in England. The Docker family's fortunes were set in motion by Thomas Docker, a Moseley brass founder; the descendants of his six sons and three daughters were established in the Midlands as professionals or gentlemen of private means. Despite Dudley Docker's own strong family loyalties, he was not given to ancestor-worship or devotion to genealogy; the notably brief pedigrees in the Burke's Landed Gentry editions of 1921 and 1937 in which he appears as head of the family of 'Docker of the Gables' contain numerous errors supplied by Docker himself- he provided erroneous information relating to the dates of his father's birth and death, his mother's death, and the name of his maternal grandfather.

Docker attended King Edward's School, Birmingham but appears to have resisted formal schooling and left early. He was equally discontented when he went into his father's office to study law. In 1881 he left his father's firm and went into the varnish business with his brother William.

=== Cricketer ===
In the 1881 season Docker played a first-class match for Derbyshire against Yorkshire which was drawn. He also played a match in the 1882 season against Sussex where he scored 25 in his first innings but Derbyshire lost by a few runs. From 1884 to 1886 he played a few games for Warwickshire, two games for Gentlemen of Warwick in 1887 and 1888 and one game again for Warwickshire in 1889.

=== Paint and varnish ===
In 1886 a third brother Ludford joined Docker Brothers and the death of his father in 1887 brought more capital into the firm. The varnish business grew into more general paint supply, and in 1894 the company opened a London office reflecting their success in winning orders from railway and rolling stock companies and Docker developed his interest and success in making deals. In 1902 he arranged the amalgamation of five rolling stock companies into the Metropolitan Amalgamated Carriage and Wagon Company, one of the largest business combines of the time which in 1911 employed 14,000 people and occupied 475 acres (1.92 km^{2}) of factory space. In 1906 he became a director of Birmingham Small Arms Company, the arms manufacturer which also grew into a leading motorcycle company. In 1908 he became a director of W & T Avery Ltd., manufacturers of weighing equipment. He became a J. P. in 1909 and his interests diversified into railways with directorship of Stratford-upon-Avon and Midland Junction Railway from 1909 to 1912, the Metropolitan Railway from 1915 to 1933, London, Brighton and South Coast Railway from 1921 to 1922 and then the Southern Railway until 1938. He was the chairman of Metropolitan Carriage and Wagon during the First World War, constructing the first tanks. He was also a director of the Midland Bank from 1912 until his death. He was one of the founders of the Federation of British Industry.

=== Death, family, and recognition ===
Docker married Lucy Constance, daughter of distinguished Birmingham legal figure John Benbow Hebbert (1809–1887), in 1895. They initially lived at Rotton Park Lodge, close to the Docker Brothers varnish factory, before moving to The Gables, at Kenilworth, and, in 1935 moved to Coleshill House, Amersham, Buckinghamshire, where Docker died. He had also acquired a flat in Berkeley Square Mayfair in 1923. Their only child Bernard Docker succeeded his father in his business enterprises.

Docker was a substantial benefactor (£10,000) toward Ernest Shackleton's Imperial Trans-Antarctic Expedition in 1914–1916. In recompense for donations toward the success of the expedition, Shackleton named one of the lifeboats aboard the expedition vessel the Dudley Docker. The benefaction proved significant when the expedition vessel sank and the castaways were forced to use the Dudley Docker for survival.

In addition to Ludford, Docker's elder brother Ralph Docker also played cricket for Derbyshire.
