= Arthur Wood (American cricketer) =

English-born American cricketer

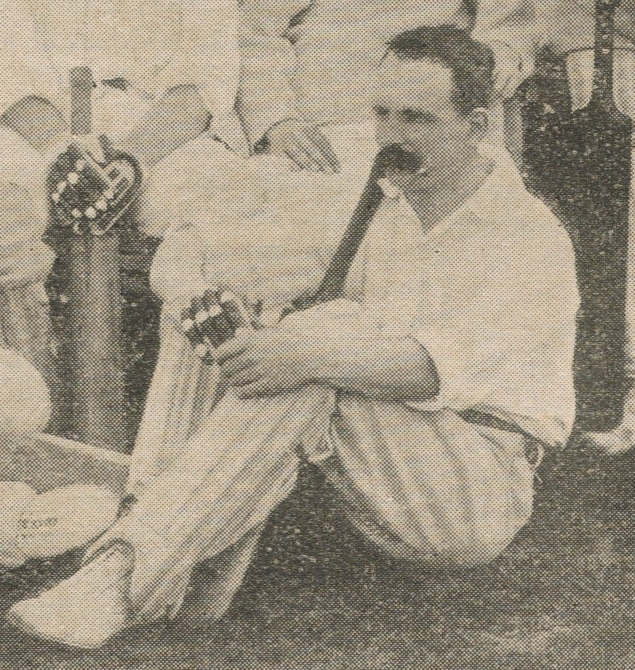
- Wood pictured in 1897

Personal information
- Full name: Arthur Machin Wood
- Born: 21 February 1861; Pye Bridge, Derbyshire, England
- Died: 25 August 1947 (aged 86); Philadelphia, United States
- Batting: Right-handed
- Bowling: Right-arm slow

Domestic team information
- Years: Team
- 1879: Derbyshire
- 1892–1909: Gentlemen of Philadelphia
- FC debut: 14 July 1879 Derbyshire v Yorkshire
- Last FC: 17 September 1909 Gentlemen of Philadelphia v Gentlemen of Ireland

Career statistics
Competition	First-class
Matches	71
Runs scored	2,675
Batting average	22.47
100s/50s	4/12
Top score	182
Balls bowled	664
Wickets	13
Bowling average	26.76
5 wickets in innings	1
10 wickets in match	0
Best bowling	6/31
Catches/stumpings	96/–
- Source: CricketArchive, 15 April 2023

Arthur Machin Wood (21 February 1861 – 25 August 1947) was an English-born American cricketer, active in the late 19th and early 20th centuries. Though he started his cricket career with Derbyshire, Wood played most of his major matches with the Philadelphian cricket team. He played a total of 71 first-class matches.

== Cricket in England ==
Wood was born in Pye Bridge in Derbyshire, England. He played a single match for Nottinghamshire against Leicestershire at Leicester, a match which began on 16 September 1878. Batting ninth he scored 15 before being bowled. Nottinghamshire won comfortably by an innings and 186 runs. Leicestershire were not ranked as a first-class county at the time.

Wood played two first-class matches for Derbyshire in the 1879 season. The first began on 14 July 1879 against Yorkshire. The eighteen-year-old scored only 5 runs in the first innings and nine in the second. He earned a spot against Nottinghamshire the following month, but fared no better scoring 9 and 5. This was Wood's last county cricket match as he moved to Philadelphia in 1879.

== Philadelphian cricket ==
The Philadelphian cricketing establishment had strict rules for maintaining an American feel in their cricket. Wood was not allowed to play on the representative Philadelphian cricket team until he had satisfied a 5-year residency requirement. In 1881 Wood accepted at offer to coach the Belmont Cricket Club and took a position with the Pennsylvania Railroad Company in Philadelphia in 1882. Though he had come to Philadelphia to manage and play for Belmont, his first-class debut in Philadelphia was between the American born cricketers in the city and those Englishmen that were resident there. Playing for the English Residents, Wood scored only 5 runs in the match and his side lost. He played in this match each year until 1884 when he first played against the Philadelphians with the rest of America. He scored 32 runs in the second innings of this loss. His debut for the Philadelphian side came on 5 September 1892 against the remaining US players. In this match, Wood led his new team with a career high 182 runs before being stumped. The Philadelphian side won by an innings and 281 runs. He played for the next five years against touring foreign sides before joining the Philadelphians on their tour of England in 1897. He also took part in the tours of 1903 and 1908. Wood died in Philadelphia on 25 August 1947.

== Teams ==
- United States of America
- Derbyshire
- Philadelphians
- GS Patterson's XI
- AM Wood's XI

== Sources ==
- Melville, T. (1998), The Tented Field, Bowling Green State University Popular Press. ISBN 0-87972-769-1.
