= Taddington =

Village in Derbyshire, England

Coordinates: 53.2378°N 1.7928°W

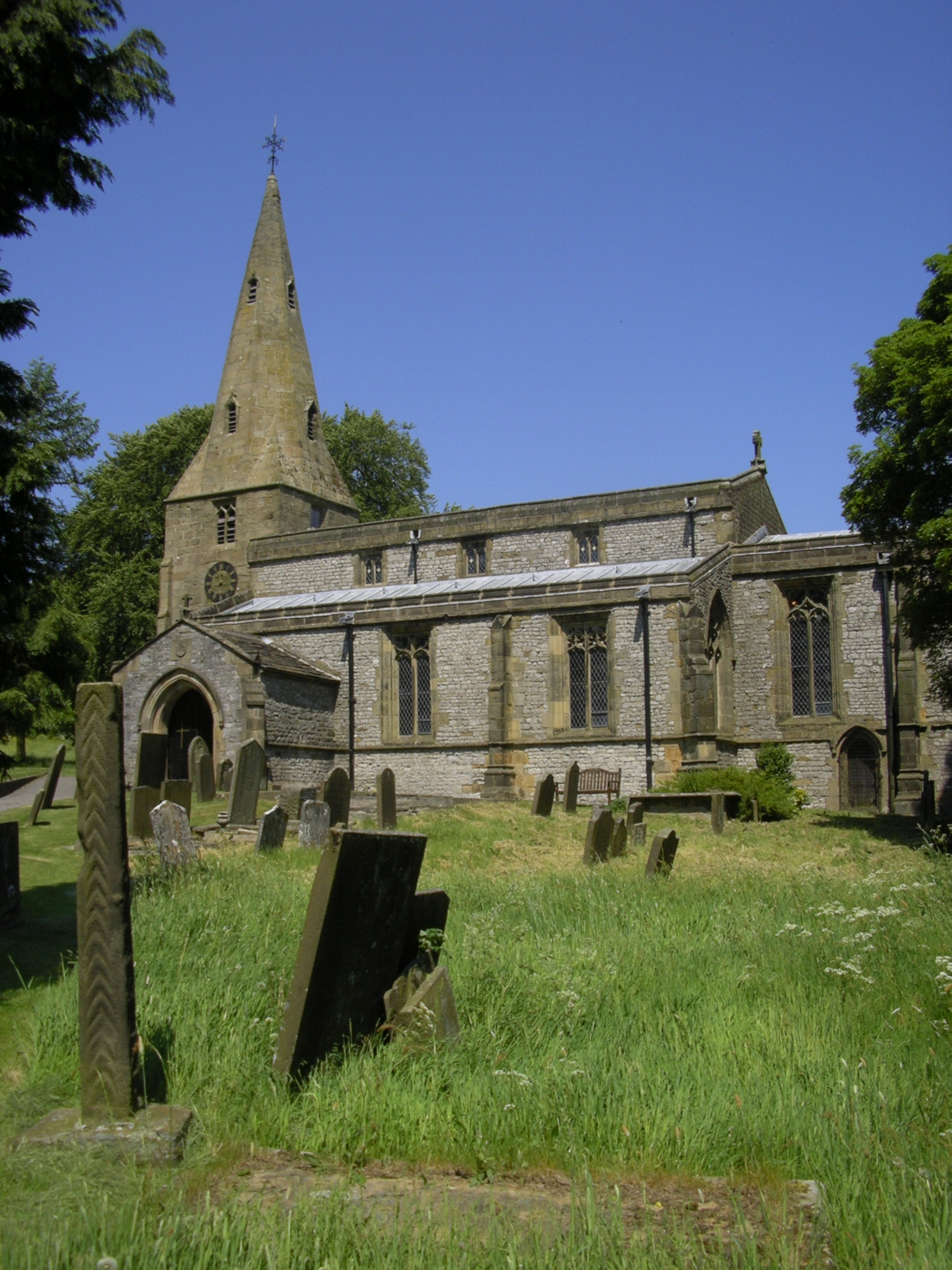
- Taddington Church from the south. The remains of the 7th-century Celtic cross are on the left.

- Location within Derbyshire
- Population: 457 (2011)
- District: Derbyshire Dales
- Shire county: Derbyshire
- Region: East Midlands
- Country: England
- Sovereign state: United Kingdom
- Post town: BUXTON
- Postcode district: SK17
- Dialling code: 01298
- Police: Derbyshire
- Fire: Derbyshire
- Ambulance: East Midlands
- UK Parliament: Derbyshire Dales

Taddington is a village and civil parish in Derbyshire, England. The population of the civil parish, together with neighbouring Blackwell in the Peak and Brushfield parishes, as taken at the 2011 census, was 457. It lies over 1,100 feet (340 m) above sea level, on the former A6 road between Buxton and Bakewell, in the Derbyshire Dales district. To the east, the A6 runs through Taddington Dale, while Taddington Moor lies to the west.

Taddington grew around farming and quarrying for limestone and lead. From 1863 to 1967 the village was served by Millers Dale railway station, some two miles away, which was on the Midland Railway's extension of the Manchester, Buxton, Matlock and Midlands Junction Railway.

The village's main attractions are the Five Wells chambered tomb topped by a cairn, and the 14th-century church, with the remains of a 7th-century Celtic cross in the churchyard. The two-metre cross shaft is decorated with an unusual chevron-based pattern. It was at one time used to support a sink in the wall of a nearby public house. A further possible cross base lies in the churchyard.

Notable buildings include Taddington Manor and Marlborough House.

Fields around the settlement show evidence of both Celtic lynchett terraces, and of mediaeval strip farming.

Taddington has one pub, the Queens Arms. In 2009 the Queens Arms opened a convenience store in the pub's pool room. A second pub, the Waterloo on the A6 road, closed in 2022. There is an annual well dressing focused on the "High Well", unusually lying above the village.

== See also ==
- Listed buildings in Taddington
