= Ludford Docker =

English cricketer and businessman

Personal information
- Full name: Ludford Charles Docker
- Born: 26 November 1860; Smethwick, Staffordshire, England
- Died: 1 August 1940 (aged 79); Alveston Leys, Warwickshire, England
- Batting: Right-handed
- Bowling: Right-arm medium-fast
- Role: All-rounder
- Relatives: Frank Dudley Docker (brother); Ralph Docker (brother)

Domestic team information
- Years: Team
- 1881–1886: Derbyshire
- 1894–1895: Warwickshire
- FC debut: 12 May 1881 Derbyshire v MCC
- Last FC: 27 June 1895 Warwickshire v Yorkshire

Career statistics
Competition	First-class
Matches	77
Runs scored	2,665
Batting average	20.82
100s/50s	1/14
Top score	107
Balls bowled	498
Wickets	9
Bowling average	31.11
5 wickets in innings	0
10 wickets in match	0
Best bowling	3/38
Catches/stumpings	41/–
- Source: CricketArchive, 1 February 2010

Ludford Charles Docker (26 November 1860 – 1 August 1940) was a businessman and an English cricketer. He played first-class cricket for Derbyshire between 1881 and 1886, captaining the side in 1884, and for Warwickshire in 1894 and 1895.

== Early life ==
Docker was born in Smethwick, Staffordshire, the son of Ralph Docker and his wife Sarah Sankey. His father was a solicitor in practice at Birmingham and Smethwick who took on a large number of public appointments. He was educated at King Edward's School, Birmingham.

== Cricket career ==
Docker played cricket for Birmingham and Kidderminster in 1879 and also played for Derbyshire Colts in the 1879 season. His first-class debut was for Derbyshire in the 1881 season. He topped their batting averages that season. He played 48 first-class matches for Derbyshire and captained the team in the 1884 season. He played his club cricket with Handsworth Wood, in the Birmingham League and in 1886 presented the Docker Shield for competition between Birmingham Schools. In 1887 he moved to Warwickshire and in the winter of 1887/88 he played with Arthur Shrewsbury's XI in Australia. He played several non-class games and some first-class games for Warwickshire when they joined the league, his last match being in 1895.

== Business and public service ==
Docker had joined his brother Frank Dudley Docker in Docker Brothers in 1886 and in 1898 became a director of Metropolitan Railway Carriage and Wagon Company of Saltley Birmingham before the amalgamation of carriage companies by his brother in 1902. He was President of Warwickshire County Cricket Club from 1915 to 1930 and in 1923 was High Sheriff of Warwickshire. He was also a J. P.

Docker died in Alveston Leys, Warwickshire aged 79. Docker's brothers Ralph Docker and Frank also played cricket for Derbyshire and Warwickshire.

Sporting positions
Preceded by Robert Smith	Derbyshire cricket captains 1884	Succeeded by Edmund Maynard
Honorary titles
Preceded by Herbert Hall Mullinger	High Sheriff of Warwickshire; 1923–1924	Succeeded by Robert Darley Guinness
