= Edmund Maynard =

English cricketer

Personal information
- Full name: Edmund Anthony Jefferson Maynard
- Born: 10 February 1861; Chesterfield, England
- Died: 10 January 1931 (aged 69); Hoon, Derbyshire, England
- Batting: Right-handed
- Bowling: Right-arm slow

Domestic team information
- Years: Team
- 1880–1887: Derbyshire
- 1881–1883: Cambridge University
- FC debut: 2 August 1880 Derbyshire v Yorkshire
- Last FC: 7 July 1887 Derbyshire v Lancashire

Career statistics
Competition	First-class
Matches	47
Runs scored	720
Batting average	8.88
100s/50s	0/1
Top score	84
Balls bowled	68
Wickets	2
Bowling average	26.50
5 wickets in innings	0
10 wickets in match	0
Best bowling	2/34
Catches/stumpings	18/–
- Source: CricketArchive, 3 February 2010

Edmund Anthony Jefferson Maynard (10 February 1861 – 10 January 1931) was an English cricketer who played for Derbyshire from 1880 to 1887 and captained the side for two seasons.

Maynard was the son of Edmund Gilling Maynard, of West House, Chesterfield. He was educated at Harrow School, where he was a member of the cricket eleven in 1879 and played his first game for Derbyshire County Cricket Club in 1880. He was at Trinity College, Cambridge and played cricket for Cambridge University Cricket Club from 1881 to 1883. After leaving Cambridge he travelled extensively, shooting bear in the Rocky Mountains in 1882, and ibex and other species of deer in India and Kashmir in 1883 and 1884. He played regularly for Derbyshire from 1880 to 1887, appearing in 37 matches. He captained the side in 1885 and 1886 and for part of 1887. He also played occasionally for Marylebone Cricket Club (MCC). He was a right arm batsman and a slow right hand bowler.

Maynard played 47 first-class matches and had 85 innings for Derbyshire and Cambridge University together. His highest score was 84, but his batting average was 8.88. As a bowler he delivered 68 balls for 53 runs, completing four maiden overs and taking 2 wickets. His bowling average was therefore 26.5. After Maynard's term as captain, Derbyshire were dropped from the league.

Maynard became a Justice of the Peace for Derbyshire. He was a keen rider to hounds and hunted with the Fitzwilliam Hunt at Cambridge, the Rufford Hunt, and the Meynell Hunt. In 1907 he bought Hoonmount Farm at Hoon, Derbyshire, and demolished the old building to create a new family home in the Arts and Crafts style. He named this Hoon Ridge, and many years later it became a rest home.

Maynard died at Hoon Ridge aged 69.

In 1887 Maynard married Margaret Blanche Sitwell, elder daughter of Mr. R. S. Wilmot Sitwell. Their son John Wilmot Maynard was killed in action in 1915.

Sporting positions
Preceded by Ludford Docker	Derbyshire cricket captains 1885–1887	Succeeded by William Chatterton
