= William Evershed =

English cricketer

Personal information
- Born: 25 November 1818; Wisborough Green, Sussex, England
- Died: 24 November 1887 (aged 68); Wisborough Green, Sussex, England

Domestic team information
- Years: Team
- 1849: Sussex
- 1845: Hampshire

Career statistics
Competition	FC
Matches	3
Runs scored	19
Batting average	6.33
100s/50s	–/–
Top score	10*
Balls bowled	12
Wickets	–
Bowling average	–
5 wickets in innings	–
10 wickets in match	–
Best bowling	–
Catches/stumpings	3/–
- Source: Cricinfo, 6 March 2010

William Evershed (25 November 1818 – 24 November 1887) was an English first-class cricketer who made his debut for Hampshire against Petworth in 1845. Evershed represented Hampshire against the same opposition again in the same season.

In 1849 Evershed made a single appearance for Sussex against Surrey.

Evershed died at Wisborough Green, Sussex on 24 November 1887.
