= Brizlincote =

Civil parish in Staffordshire, England

Coordinates: 52°47′59″N 1°36′4″W

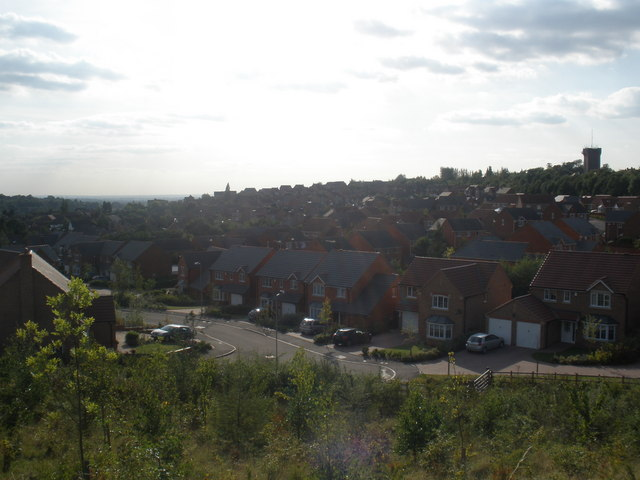
Brizlincote Valley

Brizlincote is a civil parish in Burton upon Trent in East Staffordshire, England. Formerly farmland and a manor lying in Derbyshire, it was added to the municipal borough of Burton by the Local Government Act 1888 and formally transferred to Staffordshire in 1894. It was developed for housing in the late 20th and early 21st centuries. The area of the parish was previously considered part of the (unparished) adjoining areas of Stapenhill and Winshill. All three areas are now separate parishes. Brizlincote has a population of around 5,000 and has the highest average household income of any parish in Burton.

== History ==
The parish was historically part of a farm, with Burton Abbey records showing land ownership dating back to the early 12th century, when it was held by a man named Mabon. Mabon's grandson was known as Richard of Brizlincote. By the 14th century the land became known as the manor of Brizlincote and came into the Cuyly family, then by marriage to the Stanhope family. Sir Richard Stanhope sold the land to Robert Horton of Catton by the early 15th century. It remained with the Hortons until 1546 when it was sold to Sir William Paget. Paget sold the land in 1560 to a London merchant, John Merry. The Merry family retained ownership until 1708 when it was sold to Philip Stanhope, 2nd Earl of Chesterfield.

Brizlincote Hall, now a farmhouse, was built in 1712 for the earl's son, Philip Stanhope, 3rd Earl of Chesterfield. The hall potentially occupies the site of the original medieval manor house, demolished in 1708. After the younger Phillip's death in 1726 the manor was let to tenant farmers. In the late 19th century the manor was passed to the Earls of Carnarvon.

In 1878 Brizlincote, then part of Derbyshire, was added to the municipal borough of Burton upon Trent (which lay in Staffordshire). The Local Government Act 1888 meant that the parts of the borough that lay in Derbyshire, including Brizlincote, were to be treated as if they were part of Staffordshire. The land was formally transferred to that county in 1894. Brizlincote Hall remains, now outside the parish, in Derbyshire.

The Earls of Carnarvon sold the manor farm Brizlincote, comprising 253 acres (102 ha) in 1921 to William Lomas of King Sterndale. The Lomas family retained ownership until the land was sold for housing development in the late 20th and early 21st centuries. Land in the parish was formerly farmland, as part of Holme Farm, Spring Cottage Farm, Tollgate Farm and the Model Dairy Farm. The land, also known as the Brizlincote Valley, was described locally as "Little Switzerland" for its charm and recreational use by townsfolk. The Brizlincote Quarry extracted stone from a site between Brizlincote and Stapenhill.

Brizlincote was one of seven parishes to be created when Burton was parished by East Staffordshire Borough Council in 2003. The land forming the parish was formerly part of the areas of Stapenhill and Winshill, which are now parishes in their own right.

== Location and access ==
Brizlincote lies in the south-east of the town. It borders the parish of Winshill to the north and west and Stapenhill (via the A444 road) to the south. Connection to Burton town centre is via St Peter's Bridge over the River Trent. The town of Swadlincote (in South Derbyshire) lies to the east, accessible via the A511 road. The parish is served by several bus routes.

The geology is sandstone, with some marl, overlain with boulder clay and a loamy soil. The land rises away from the River Trent at elevation 147 feet (45 m) to a height of around 300 feet (91 m) near Brizlincote Hall. The Brizlincote Brook, flowing to the Trent, is now largely culverted.

== Demographics ==
The population of the civil parish as taken at the 2011 census was 5,385. It is one of the more affluent parishes in Burton, with an average house price of approx. £250,000. Brizlincote households have the highest annual income of any Burton parish.
