= Listed buildings in Winshill =

Winshill is a civil parish in the district of East Staffordshire, Staffordshire, England. The parish contains four listed buildings that are recorded in the National Heritage List for England. All the listed buildings are designated at Grade II, the lowest of the three grades, which is applied to "buildings of national importance and special interest". The parish is in the eastern part of the town of Burton upon Trent. The listed buildings consist of a former flour mill and an associated building, a milepost, and a church.

== Buildings ==
Name and location	Photograph	Date	Notes
Mill building west of Burton Mill; 52.81349°N 1.61193°W	—	18th century	The mill building is in red brick with corbelled eaves, and a tile roof with stone coped gable ends. There are four storeys and eight bays. The windows are multi-paned with segmental heads.
Burton Mill; 52.81349°N 1.61154°W		Early 19th century	The former flour mill is in red brick that has a tile roof with stone coped gable ends. There are three storeys and eight bays, and casement windows. The building incorporates remains of the corn mill of Burton Abbey including late medieval masonry, a mullioned window and a blocked doorway with a segmental head.
Milepost in stone wall, Ashby Road; 52.80426°N 1.61020°W		19th century	The milepost consists of a rectangular plaque set in a stone wall. It is inscribed with the distances in miles to London, Ashby and Burton upon Trent.
St Marks Church; 52.80827°N 1.60482°W		1869	The church is built in stone, in Gothic Revival style, and contains Geometrical tracery. It consists of a nave, north and south aisles, a chancel and a southwest steeple. The steeple has a tower with a south porch, a clock face on the south side, and a broach spire with lucarnes.
