= Winshill Water Tower =

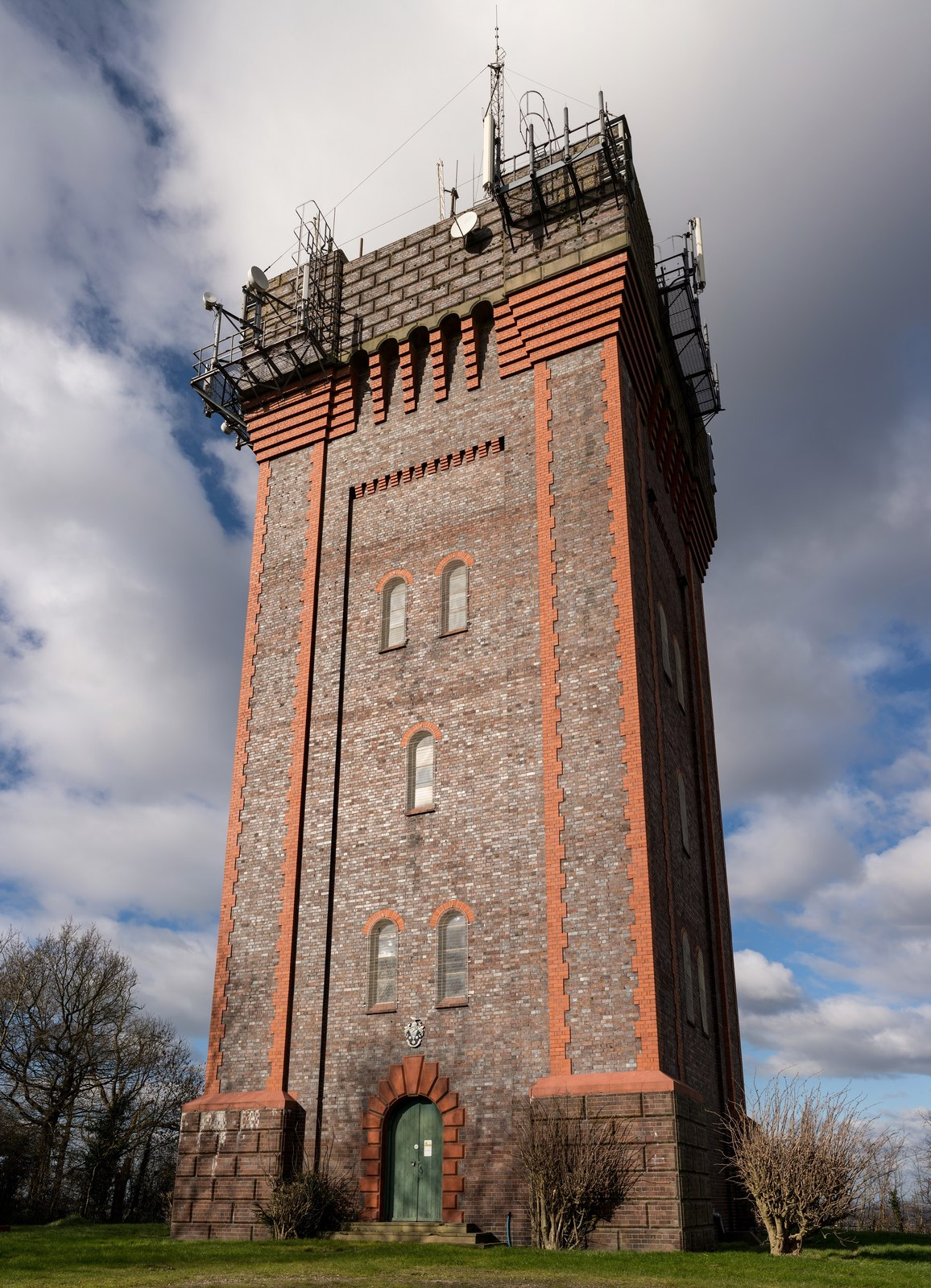
- View of the tower

- Location within Staffordshire
- Alternative names: Waterloo Tower

General information
- Status: Disused
- Type: Water tower
- Location: Winshill, Burton upon Trent, Staffordshire, England
- Coordinates: 52.8015°N 1.607040°W
- Completed: 1907
- Owner: South Staffordshire Water

Tower seen on the skyline (at mid-right) from the north

Winshill Water Tower (also known as Waterloo Tower) is a former water tower in Burton upon Trent, England. It was constructed in 1907 after a local resident won a High Court ruling against the South Staffordshire Waterworks Company for poor water-supply pressure. The brick tower held a cast-iron water tank at a height of 80 feet (24 m) to provide sufficient hydraulic head to improve water pressure. Constructed on Burton's highest point known as Waterloo Clump, the tower is visible from across the town and is a well known local landmark. The tower ceased to have any role in water supply in the 1990s but has since been used as a radio tower.

== Description ==
Winshill Water Tower is one of Burton upon Trent's most prominent buildings, visible on the skyline from far afield, and has been used as a landmark by road and rail travellers for decades. It is constructed atop Scalpcliffe Hill, from which there are views across most of the town, and lies close to Winshill's boundary with Brizlincote parish. The tower stands adjacent to a small section of woodland known as Waterloo Clump which was planted by local people to commemorate the Duke of Wellington's victory in 1815. On the Brizlincote side of the hill an area of woodland, planted by the National Forest Company, has been named Tower Woods after the landmark.

The tower is constructed on an 8 feet (2.4 m) thick concrete foundation that is 50 feet (15 m) square. The exterior is brickwork, largely brown brindle Staffordshire bricks laid in English bond, with details picked out in different coloured bricks. The top of the tower is castellated.

Inside the tower, at a height of 80 feet (24 m) and supported on rolled steel joists atop a brick pier, stood a cast-iron water tank. Water was pumped to this tank to provide the necessary pressure to supply the houses of Winshill. The tank measured 28 feet (8.5 m) by 11 feet (3.4 m) and in service was kept full to a level of 10 feet 3 inches (3.12 m) by a float-operated valve, providing a head of water exactly 496 feet (151 m) above sea level. The tank was fed by water pumped up a pipe internal to the structure, to protect it from freezing.

== History ==
In the early 20th century the residents of Winshill complained about the poor water pressure from their taps. One resident, Harry Mills Barrow, took the South Staffordshire Waterworks Company to the High Court, at his own expense, over the matter in 1905. In 1906 the court decided in his favour and compelled the water company to remedy the situation. For his efforts, Barrow was rewarded with a sum of money and an illuminated house sign, that remained in use at an address in Ashby Road until the 1960s.

Construction of the water tower was carried out in 1907 and the Burton Town Council made a contribution of £1,000 towards the costs. The tower was originally supplied from the nearby water main in Ashby Road via an electric pump in Hamilton Road. The feed was later switched to the company's 18-inch (460 mm) water main in Saxon Street (Stapenhill), which was the main supply to Burton from the pumping station at Chilcote. The Ashby Road supply was maintained as a backup.

During the First World War local scouts mounted a guard on the tower, primarily as fire wardens, owing to the fear of German invasion or Zeppelin attack. The town would become one of the first in Britain to be attacked by German strategic bombing when a Zeppelin raid of 31 January 1916 killed 15 people and wounded 72. During the 1960s the South Staffordshire Waterworks Company installed aerials onto the tower as part of a short-wave radio system used by its engineers to contact the company headquarters. Other antennas and mobile-phone masts have since been added, particularly since the tower lost its role in water supply in the 1990s. The tower remains in the ownership of South Staffordshire Water. In December 2025 an application was made for planning permission to convert the water tower into a five-bedroom luxury home.
