= Stapenhill Gardens =

Park in Burton-on-Trent, Staffordshire, England

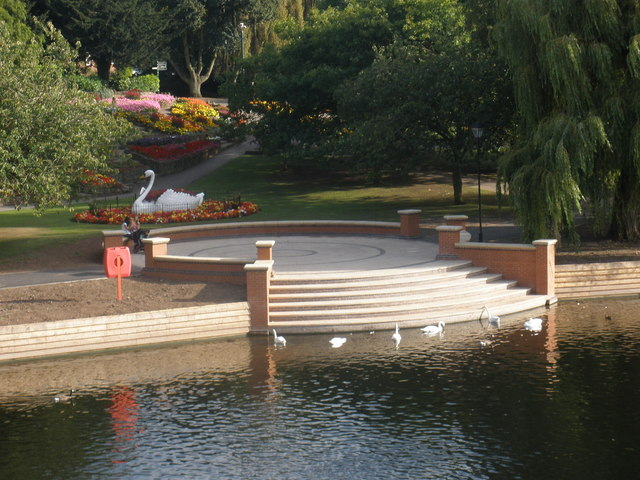
- The riverside in Stapenhill Gardens

- Location within Staffordshire
- Type: Public park
- Location: Stapenhill, Burton on Trent
- Coordinates: 52°47′56″N 1°37′26″W
- Created: 1933
- Operator: East Staffordshire Borough Council

Stapenhill Gardens is a park in the Stapenhill neighbourhood of Burton-on-Trent, in England. It mainly comprises the former site of Stapenhill House, which was donated to the town in 1933, woodland, lawn, wild flower meadows and formal planted areas along a 1,250-metre (4,100 ft) stretch of the River Trent. A public space, it includes a large cement-rendered sculpture of a swan that has been described as a "Burton landmark".

== Stapenhill House and park ==
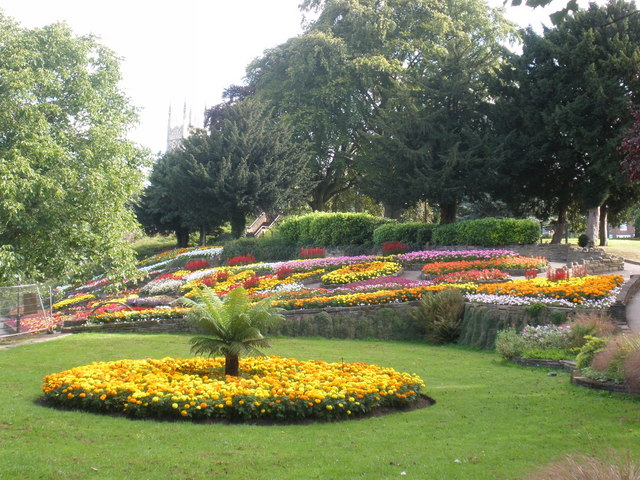
Formal planting at Stapenhill Gardens; Stapenhill House was sited behind the trees in the background.

The park has been remodelled from that of demolished manor house Stapenhill House which had a drive leading into Main Street. The house was H-shaped in plan and built primarily of brick with stone around windows (stone-dressing). In 1662 the parish recorded its nine hearths under the new system of hearth tax. The house came into the ownership of the Goodger family. Mary Goodger became the first female councillor of the borough in 1923, aged 84, and her son's wife its first female mayor in 1931. Her son Henry, a solicitor who inherited the practice of H. Goodger & Son, donated the estate to the town in 1933, in her memory. The 11.7-hectare gift enabled the joining up of an unbroken stretch of 1250 m of publicly owned parkland on the River Trent's north bank.

For a time in the 1920s and 1930s a portion of the park, now known as The Dingle, was the Stapenhill Zoological Pleasure Gardens which had a bear pit and two crocodiles. This area now has a car park and children's play area.

== In public ownership ==
The County Borough of Burton upon Trent demolished Stapenhill House and laid out gardens on the site. Much of the original layout was retained. Two bandstands (one has since been demolished) and a children's play area were later added. A sundial in the gardens marks the spot of the original house. Some of the site was lost in 1985 to allow construction of St Peter's Bridge which is on viaduct and decorated with flower containers.

The site is mostly woodland, lawns, wild meadows and formal flower beds with trees and shrubberies. Its arboretum is near St Peter's Church and riverside steps lead to a swan feeding area. The park has three parts: Stapenhill Gardens, Stapenhill Hollows and the Woodland Walk. Car parking is provided at Main Street, Ferry Street and Stapenhill Hollows. The gardens are used by residents for passing on foot, picnicking and feeding the swans.

The Diversitree sculpture was installed in 2016, replacing a 15-foot (4.6 m) diameter sloped flower bed near St Peter's Bridge. The sculpture emulates a tree in metal and is intended to illustrate local communities and reflect being part of the National Forest (England). Diversitree was the winning entry of 30 artists' designs and cost £15,000.

A Peace and Unity Garden was opened in the park in July 2018. It celebrates the diversity of Burton and commemorates the centenary of the end of World War I.

=== Abandoned proposals ===
In 2018 public toilets were threatened with closure, in cost-cutting by East Staffordshire after reduced central government funding. The plan prompted a campaign and petition which convinced a council meeting to abandon it.

== Swan ==
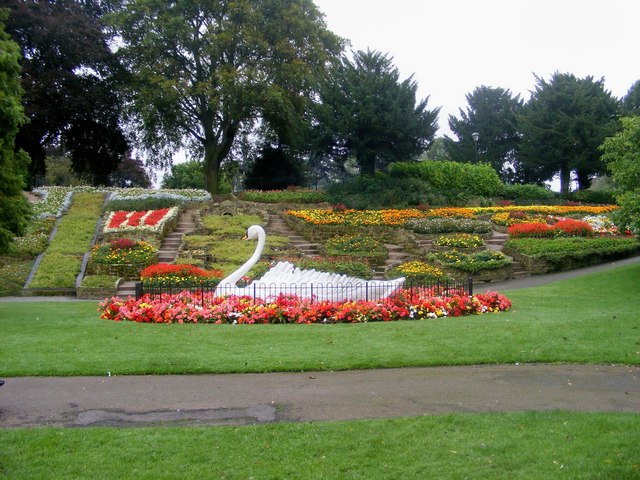
The Stapenhill Gardens swan

The park is notable for containing a large concrete sculpture of a swan, which has been described as a "Burton landmark". The sculpture, which also functions as a planter, was constructed by the borough council in 1953. Which of four competing symbolisms applies is unknown:

It may be linked to the Coronation of Queen Elizabeth II which took place that year - the monarch co-owns all mute swans since medieval times. It may recite folklore surrounding St Modwen, who founded Burton Abbey, being said to have first brought mute swans to the area. It may honour of the rare sighting of whooper and Bewick's swans on the Trent locally in April 1951 including that a Bewick swan (straight-necked as is the sculpture) nested in the grounds of St Peter's Church. It may represent a mute swan which was rescued with the help of a council gardener after having been found covered in oil in a town boatyard in the early 1950s; the swan, which died a few years later, is said to have been buried beneath or elsewhere in the park.

The Burton park superintendent at the time was keen to employ his staff, somewhat unusually at the time, through the winter season so commissioned from them the sculpture's building. Its wings and base are reclaimed bricks, partly bound in chicken wire, then rendered with mortar. The neck was formed around a rebar support, obtained from the council's road department, and the eyes were made from glass marbles purchased at the town's outlet of Woolworths. The superintendent was not pleased with the modernist work, which he described to the treasurer as a "monstrosity", but it was liked by local people ensuring its survival.

The swan was restored in summer 2018: damaged parts were replaced and new coats of render and paint were applied—prompted by complaints by Burton Civic Society in October 2017 and seeing expenditure of £3,000, a tiny proportion of the council's budget.
