= Listed buildings in Stapenhill =

Stapenhill is a civil parish in the district of East Staffordshire, Staffordshire, England. The parish contains five listed buildings that are recorded in the National Heritage List for England. All the listed buildings are designated at Grade II, the lowest of the three grades, which is applied to "buildings of national importance and special interest". The parish is in the eastern part of the town of Burton upon Trent. The listed buildings are a timber framed farmhouse, a town house, the gateway to a cemetery, a church, and a footbridge.

== Buildings ==
Name and location	Photograph	Date	Notes
The Old Farm, Holly Street; 52.79333°N 1.62160°W	—	16th century	The building is timber framed with brick infill, the front is plastered, the east gable end has been replaced in brick, and in the west gable end is exposed timber framing. There are modillion eaves, two storeys and three bays. The windows are three-light casements.
72 Main Street; 52.79344°N 1.62345°W	—	c. 1800	A red brick house with dentilled eaves and a tile roof. There are three storeys and three bays. Steps lead up to the central doorway that has pilasters, a rectangular fanlight, and a small cornice hood. This is flanked by canted bay windows, and in the upper floors are sash windows.
Gateway to Cemetery; 52.80263°N 1.62122°W		1866	The gateway to the cemetery is in stone and is in Gothic style. In the centre is a large arch, flanked by smaller arches, all with pointed heads and gables with poppyhead finials. Flanking the central arch are buttresses containing niches with statues, rising to form pinnacles. The gates are in wrought iron.
St Peter's Church; 52.79616°N 1.62310°W		1880–81	The church is built in Derbyshire sandstone with dressings in Ancaster and Bath stone, the upper stage of the tower is in limestone, the aisles have lead roofs, and the other roofs are slated. It consists of a nave with a clerestory, north and south aisles, a south porch, a chancel with a south chapel and a north organ chamber, and a southwest tower. The tower has three stages, diagonal buttresses, a south doorway, clock faces, and an embattled parapet with open tracery and pinnacles.
Ferry Bridge; 52.79457°N 1.62603°W		1889	A footbridge over the River Trent, it is an iron suspension bridge with a single span. Between the towers are shaped entablatures with the date, and at the sides is open latticework. Under the towers are circular cast iron piers with voluted capitals, and at the ends are abutments in rusticated stone.
