= William Henry Wesley =

English artist, astronomer and administrator

- Born: 23 August 1841; Stapenhill, Staffordshire, England
- Died: 17 October 1922 (aged 81); London, England
- Citizenship: United Kingdom
- Occupation: Assistant secretary of the Royal Astronomical Society

William Henry Wesley (1841–1922) was an engraver, artist, astronomer and administrator, who worked as assistant secretary of the Royal Astronomical Society from 1875 to his death in 1922.

Wesley was born at Stapenhill, Staffordshire, England, the son of a printer and publisher. He moved with his family to London in 1855, and became an apprentice to an engraver. He developed a reputation as a skilled technical artist, preparing and engraving diagrams for scientific publications.

Wesley was asked by the astronomer Arthur Cowper Ranyard to prepare an engraving of the Sun's corona from photographs of the 1871 total solar eclipse. When the position of assistant secretary to the Royal Astronomical Society became vacant, Cowper Raynard pushed Wesley to apply. Wesley was appointed. The assistant secretary was the society's primary administrative official.

William Henry Wesley reorganised and updated the administration of the society. He prepared a catalogue of its extensive library.

He travelled to Algiers to observe the total solar eclipse of 28 May 1900. He concluded that photography was capable of recording more detail in the Sun's corona than could be seen visually through a telescope.

Wesley prepared diagrams for scientific publications. This included charts of the Milky Way and maps of the Moon's surface.

Wesley was an author of articles in the Dictionary of National Biography, including the short one about the astronomer Arthur Cowper Ranyard.
