= Robert Sutton (martyr) =

English Roman Catholic priest and martyr

Blessed Robert Sutton
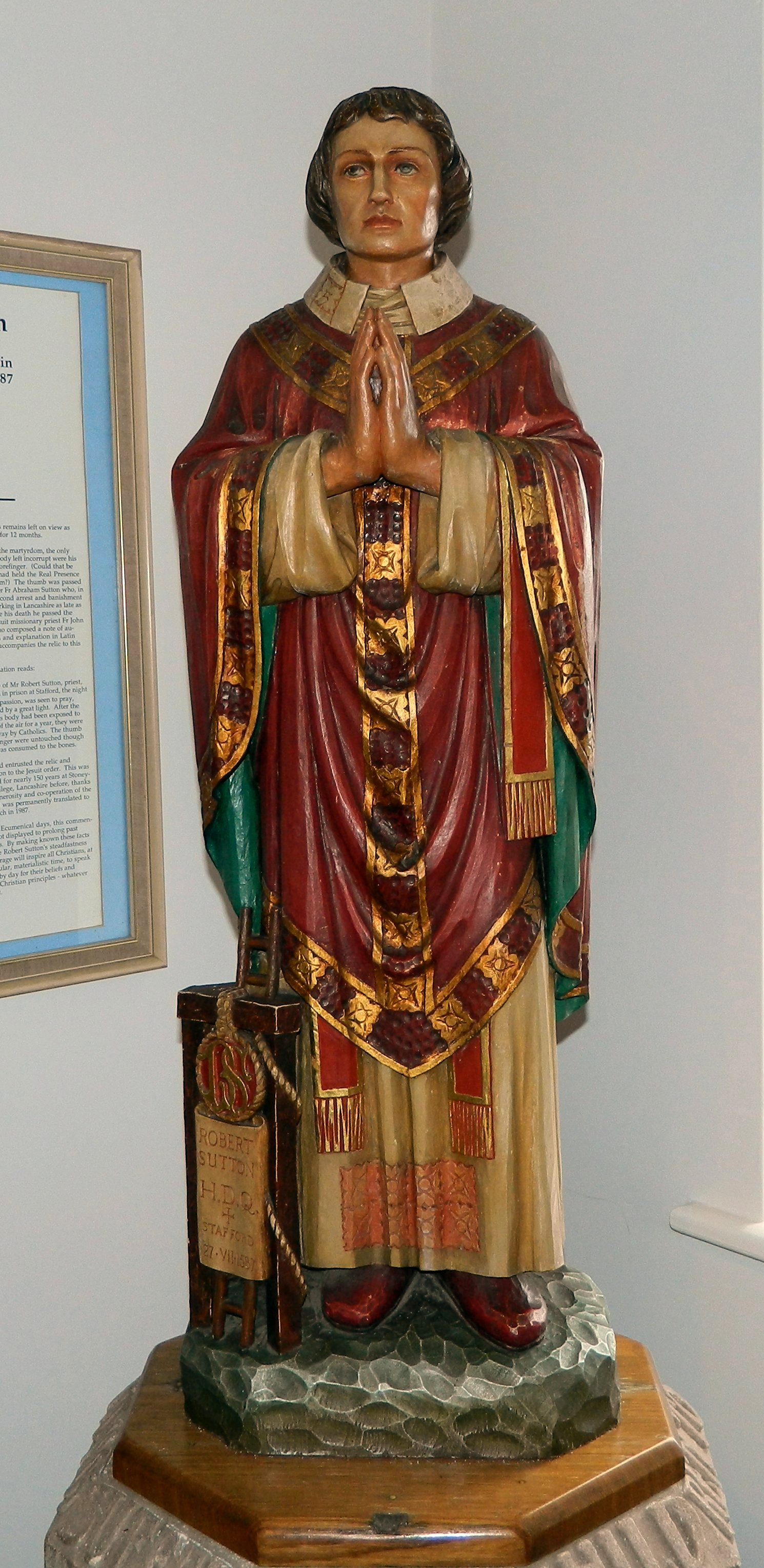
- Statue of Bl. Robert Sutton at Our Lady of Victories Church, Lutterworth
- Born: c. 1543-1545; Burton-on-Trent, England
- Died: 27 July 1588 (aged 42–45); Stafford, England
- Venerated in: Roman Catholic Church
- Beatified: 1987 by Pope John Paul II

Robert Sutton (c. 1543-1545; Burton-on-Trent – 27 July 1587; Stafford) was an English Roman Catholic priest. He is a Catholic martyr, beatified in 1987.

== Life ==
Sutton was born in Burton-on-Trent sometime between 1543 and 1545, and baptised in St Modwen's Parish Church on 11 September 1545. His father was a carpenter. He was ordained an Anglican minister in 1566 and took the degree of M. A. from Christ Church, Oxford, 9 July 1567. He became Rector of Lutterworth, Leicestershire, on 17 June 1571. He was converted to Catholicism by his younger brother William, who later became a Jesuit.

With his younger brother Abraham, who matriculated from Hart Hall in 1576, aged 25, he arrived at Douai, 23 March 1576. They were both ordained subdeacons at Cambrai in September, deacons in December, and priests in the following February. They left for the English Mission on 19 March 1578. Robert and his brother Abraham were arrested, imprisoned, and banished in 1585.

Robert returned to England and was arrested while saying Mass at Stafford. He was condemned for being a Catholic priest. He was martyred at Gallows Flat, Stafford on 27 July 1588. Sentenced to be hanged, drawn and quartered, he was cut down still alive, and while attempting to stand, his head was cut off with a blow to the mouth.

== Veneration ==
Sutton was beatified by Pope John Paul II in 1987. He is celebrated in the Roman Catholic diocese of Nottingham with an optional memorial on October 5, alongside Anthony Turner and George Douglas and the martyrs of Leicestershire

=== Relics ===
After the lapse of a year Catholics, wishing to have some relics of the martyr, carried off one night he theft of a shoulder and an arm. After the parts of his body being exposed to the birds of the air for a year, all were bones except the thumb and forefinger, relatively intact, which came into the possession of his brother Abraham. Abraham Sutton gave John Gerard the thumb, later presented in a reliquary to Stonyhurst College. In 1987 the Jesuits, translated it back to Lutterworth where it is reserved in a niche within the altar of Our Lady of Victories Church, Lutterworth.

In 1850 there was found hidden in the sanctuary behind the old chapel of Sutton Place a box of relics containing a rib bone with a label attached bearing the notation in what appeared to be sixteenth or seventeenth century, "R. Sutton, Staffordiae". This relic was placed in the sacristy of St. Edmund's Church, Sutton Park.

== See also ==
- Douai Martyrs
- Blessed Robert Sutton Catholic Voluntary Academy
