= Blessed Robert Sutton Catholic Voluntary Academy =

Location
- Bluestone Lane; Stapenhill; Burton upon Trent; Staffordshire, DE15 9SD; England; 52.7864°N 1.6153°W

Information
- Type: Academy
- Religious affiliation: Roman Catholic
- Established: 1964
- Local authority: Staffordshire County Council
- Trust: St Ralph Sherwin Catholic Multi Academy Trust
- Department for Education URN: 146235 Tables
- Ofsted: Reports
- Headteacher: Laura O'Leary
- Gender: Co-educational
- Age: 11 to 16
- Enrolment: 615 as of August 2020
- Website: http://www.robertsutton.staffs.sch.uk/

Blessed Robert Sutton Catholic Voluntary Academy is a co-educational secondary school located in the Stapenhill area of Burton upon Trent in the English county of Staffordshire. The school is named after Robert Sutton, a 16th Century Catholic priest and martyr who was born in Burton upon Trent.

== History ==
Established in 1964 as Robert Sutton Catholic High School, it was a voluntary aided Catholic school administered by Staffordshire County Council and the Roman Catholic Diocese of Nottingham. The school gained specialist status as a Sports College in 2005 and was renamed Blessed Robert Sutton Catholic Sports College. In September 2018 it converted to an academy and become part of the St Ralph Sherwin Catholic Multi Academy Trust.

== Description ==
Blessed Robert Sutton Catholic Voluntary Academy offers GCSEs and BTECs as programmes of study for pupils, while students in the sixth form have the option to study from a range of A-levels and further BTECs. The school previously shared a sixth form provision with the neighbouring Paulet High School, however from 2015 through 2020, Blessed Robert Sutton Catholic Sports College offered its own separate sixth form provision.

== Sixth form ==
The school offered a sixth form program up until 2019. At that time, citing financial issues, the school's head teacher announced the closure of the Sixth Form program, ceasing to accept new students after September 2019, and closing the program completely after August 2020.

== Notable former pupils ==
- Nathan Dawe, DJ
