= William Coltman =

English Victoria Cross recipient (1891–1974)

William Harold Coltman
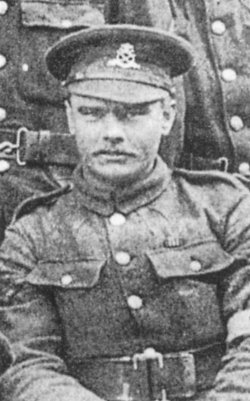
- Born: 17 November 1891; Tatenhill Common, Burton upon Trent
- Died: 29 June 1974 (aged 82); Outwoods Hospital, Burton upon Trent
- Burial place: St Mark's, Winshill, Burton upon Trent
- Military career
- Allegiance: United Kingdom
- Branch: British Army
- Service years: 1915–1919; 1941–1951
- Rank: Lieutenant
- Service number: 3585 (later 241028)
- Unit: The North Staffordshire Regiment (The Prince of Wales's)
- Conflicts: First World War; Second World War
- Awards: Victoria Cross; Distinguished Conduct Medal & Bar; Military Medal & Bar; Mentioned in dispatches

William Harold Coltman, VC, DCM & Bar, MM & Bar (17 November 1891 – 29 June 1974) was an English recipient of the Victoria Cross (VC), the highest award for gallantry in the face of the enemy that could be awarded to British and Commonwealth forces. He was the most decorated other rank of the First World War.

== Early life ==
Coltman was born at Rangemore, a village on the outskirts of Burton upon Trent, Staffordshire, and baptised at All Saints, Rangemore on 27 December 1891. He worked as a market gardener. He became a member of the Open Brethren, and taught in the Sunday School in the village of Winshill. He volunteered for the British Army in January 1915, during the opening months of the First World War. He served in The North Staffordshire Regiment (The Prince of Wales's), in the 1/6th Battalion.

== Victoria Cross ==
Lance Corporal Coltman was 26 years old and a stretcher bearer, when the following deed took place in France, for which he was awarded the VC.

For most conspicuous bravery, initiative and devotion to duty. During the operations at Mannequin Hill, north-east of Sequehart, on the 3rd and 4th of Oct. 1918, L.-Corp. Coltman, a stretcher bearer, hearing that wounded had been left behind during a retirement, went forward alone in the face of fierce enfilade fire, found the casualties, dressed them and on three successive occasions, carried comrades on his back to safety, thus saving their lives. This very gallant NCO tended the wounded unceasingly for 48 hours.

Coltman was invested with his Victoria Cross by King George V at Buckingham Palace on 22 May 1919.

== Distinguished Conduct Medal ==
The first award of the Distinguished Conduct Medal (DCM) was made for gallantry over a period of days in July 1917. The citation in The London Gazette reads:

Conspicuous gallantry and devotion to duty in evacuating wounded from the front line at great personal risk under shell fire. His gallant conduct undoubtedly saved many lives, and he continued throughout the night to search for wounded under shell and machine gun fire, and brought several in. His absolute indifference to danger had a most inspiring effect upon the rest of his men.

=== Bar to the DCM ===
The second award of the DCM was made for conduct in September 1918, only a week before his actions that earned him the VC. The citation read:

On the 28th September 1918, near the St. Quentin Canal, near Bellenglise, he dressed and carried many wounded men under heavy artillery fire. During the advance on the following day he still remained at his work without rest or sleep, attending the wounded, taking no heed of either shell or machine-gun fire, and never resting until he was positive that our sector was clear of wounded. He set the highest example of fearlessness and devotion to duty to those with him.

== Military Medal ==
The Military Medal (MM) is gazetted when awarded but no citation is given. Coltman was still a private at the time of this award. The award was made for rescuing a wounded officer from no man's land in February 1917. The officer had been commanding a wiring party during a misty night. The mist cleared and the party found themselves under fire, the officer was wounded in the thigh and Coltman immediately went out to bring the man in.

=== Bar to the MM ===
The second award of the MM was gazetted in August 1917. This award was for conduct behind the front lines in June 1917 and covered three separate instances of gallantry in a short period in June 1917. On 6 June an ammunition dump was hit by mortar fire causing several casualties, Coltman took responsibility for removing Verey lights from the dump. The following day he took a leading role in tending men injured when the company headquarters was mortared. A little over a week later, a trench tunnel collapsed trapping a number of men. Coltman organised a rescue party to dig the trapped men out.

== Other awards ==
Prior to any of his decorations Coltman was mentioned in dispatches for his work.

== Later life ==
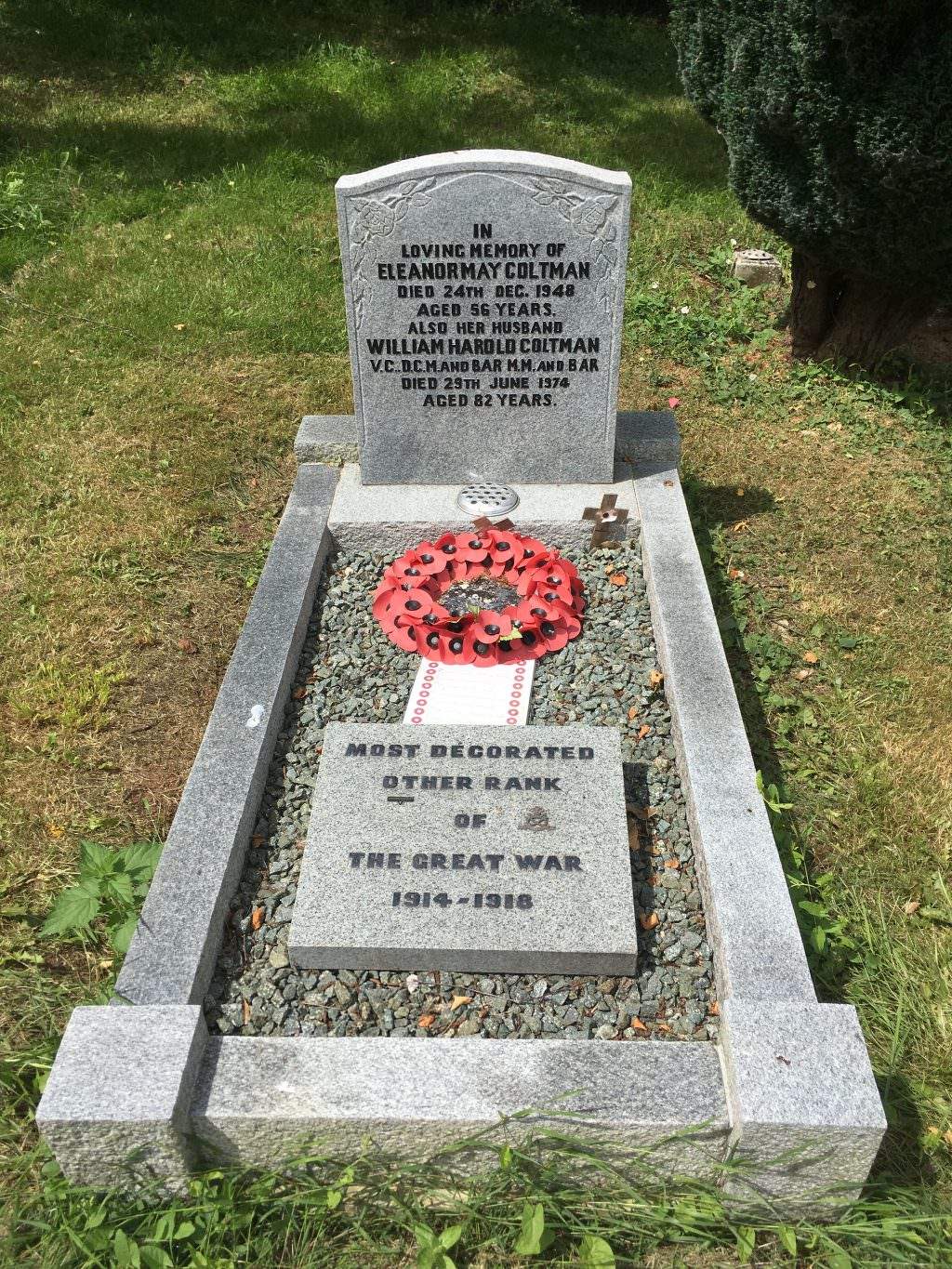
The grave of Coltman and his wife Eleanor

After the war, Coltman returned to Burton and took a job as a gardener with the town's Parks Department. During the Second World War he was commissioned in the Army Cadet Force in 1943 and commanded the Burton ACF; he resigned his commission in 1951. He retired in 1963 and died at Outwoods Hospital, Burton, in 1974 at the age of 82. He is buried in the churchyard of St Mark's parish church in Winshill with his wife Eleanor May (née Dolman).

== Legacy ==
The Coltman Trench at the Staffordshire Regiment Museum

His medals, including his Victoria Cross, are on display at the Staffordshire Regiment Museum at Whittington Barracks, Lichfield, Staffordshire. At the museum there is a replica First World War trench named in honour of Coltman. Coltman House is the headquarters building of Defence Medical Services at Whittington Barracks. The Burton Army Cadet Force base and Army Reserve Centre is at Coltman House, Hawkins Lane, Burton.

There is a monument to Coltman at the Memorial Gardens, Lichfield Street, Burton. The Coltman VC Peace Wood is at Mill Hill Lane, Winshill. In Tunstall a road has been named in honour of Coltman.
