= Ferry Bridge, Burton =

Footbridge in Burton upon Trent

Coordinates: 52.79457°N 1.626021°W

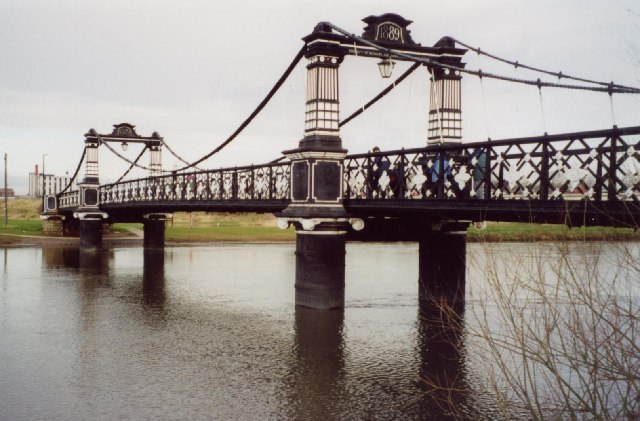
Ferry Bridge in 2002

Ferry Bridge (also called the Stapenhill Ferry Bridge and the Stapenhill Suspension Bridge) is a Victorian pedestrian bridge over the River Trent in Staffordshire, England. The bridge and its extension, the Stapenhill Viaduct, link Burton upon Trent town centre to the suburb of Stapenhill half a mile away on the other side of the river.

The bridge is a "semi-suspension" bridge, of which this is the first and only one of its kind in Europe to be built to this design. It was designed and constructed by a local firm, Thornewill and Warham. It is a three-span footbridge totalling 240 ft (73 m) in length. The chains were made of flat bar iron, and are continuous from one end of the bridge to the other. They are riveted to the ends of the main girders, not anchored at a distance as they would normally be on a traditional suspension design. The bridge is made of wrought iron and cast iron, and is Grade II listed.

The bridge was built to replace a small ferry service that had operated at the same site since the 13th century. The Ferry Bridge was gifted to the town by brewing magnate Michael Arthur Bass, later Lord Burton. It was officially opened on Wednesday 3 April 1889, and the ceremony was attended by between 8,000 and 10,000 people.

The bridge has remained in use by hundreds of people every day, apart from during two renovations, most recently in 2015–2016. The bridge carries National Cycle Route 63 between Stapenhill and Burton town centre.

== Background ==
Stapenhill Bridge Act 1865
- Act of Parliament
- Parliament of the United Kingdom
- Long title: An Act for the making and maintaining of Stapenhill Bridge over the River Trent near to the Town of Burton-upon-Trent, with Approaches thereto, and for the discontinuing of Stapenhill Ferry across the River; and for other Purposes.
- Citation: 28 & 29 Vict. c. cccxiv

Dates
- Royal assent: 5 July 1865

Other legislation
- Repealed by: Staffordshire Act 1983

Status: Repealed

Text of statute as originally enacted

Stapenhill Bridge Act 1870
- Act of Parliament
- Parliament of the United Kingdom
- Long title: An Act to extend the time for the completion of Stapenhill Bridge at Burton-upon-Trent.
- Citation: 33 & 34 Vict. c. lxvii

Dates
- Royal assent: 20 June 1870

Other legislation
- Repealed by: Staffordshire Act 1983

Status: Repealed

Text of statute as originally enacted

Stapenhill Bridge Act 1880
- Act of Parliament
- Parliament of the United Kingdom
- Long title: An Act for the abandonment of the Bridge authorised by the Stapenhill Bridge Act, 1865, and for the making and maintaining of another Bridge in lieu thereof; and for other purposes.
- Citation: 43 & 44 Vict. c. liii

Dates
- Royal assent: 9 July 1880

Other legislation
- Repealed by: Staffordshire Act 1983
- Relates to: Stapenhill Bridge Act 1865

Status: Repealed

Text of statute as originally enacted

In the 19th century the brewing industry in Burton and hence the population of the town expanded greatly. As a result, pedestrians often had to wait a considerable time for the ferry. Two boats were needed at peak times. The clamour for a second bridge over the Trent grew. The Marquis of Anglesey, who owned the rights for the ferry, obtained an act of Parliament, the Stapenhill Bridge Act 1865 (28 & 29 Vict. c. cccxiv), authorising him to build and maintain a bridge over the River Trent. The bridge was intended to carry all traffic and to be as good as or better than the old Burton Bridge, at that time the only bridge across the river in Burton. Plans were drawn up but never implemented.

Stapenhill Bridge Act 1886
- Act of Parliament
- Parliament of the United Kingdom
- Long title: An Act for making and maintaining a Bridge across the River Trent at Stapenhill Ferry and for other purposes.
- Citation: 49 & 50 Vict. c. cxv

Dates
- Royal assent: 25 June 1886

Text of statute as originally enacted

In 1885 the Marquis sought parliamentary approval to build a smaller footbridge over the River Trent near the site of the Stapenhill ferry and to sell the ferry rights to Burton Corporation. After long negotiations between the council and the Marquis, Burton brewery owner Sir Michael Arthur Bass (later Lord Burton) offered to have a footbridge built at his own expense, as long as the council bought the ferry rights from the Marquis. The Stapenhill Bridge Act 1886 (49 & 50 Vict. c. cxv) was passed to authorise the bridge.

The council agreed to pay the Marquis the then huge sum of £12,950 for the rights. Work started in 1888.

== Bridge builders ==
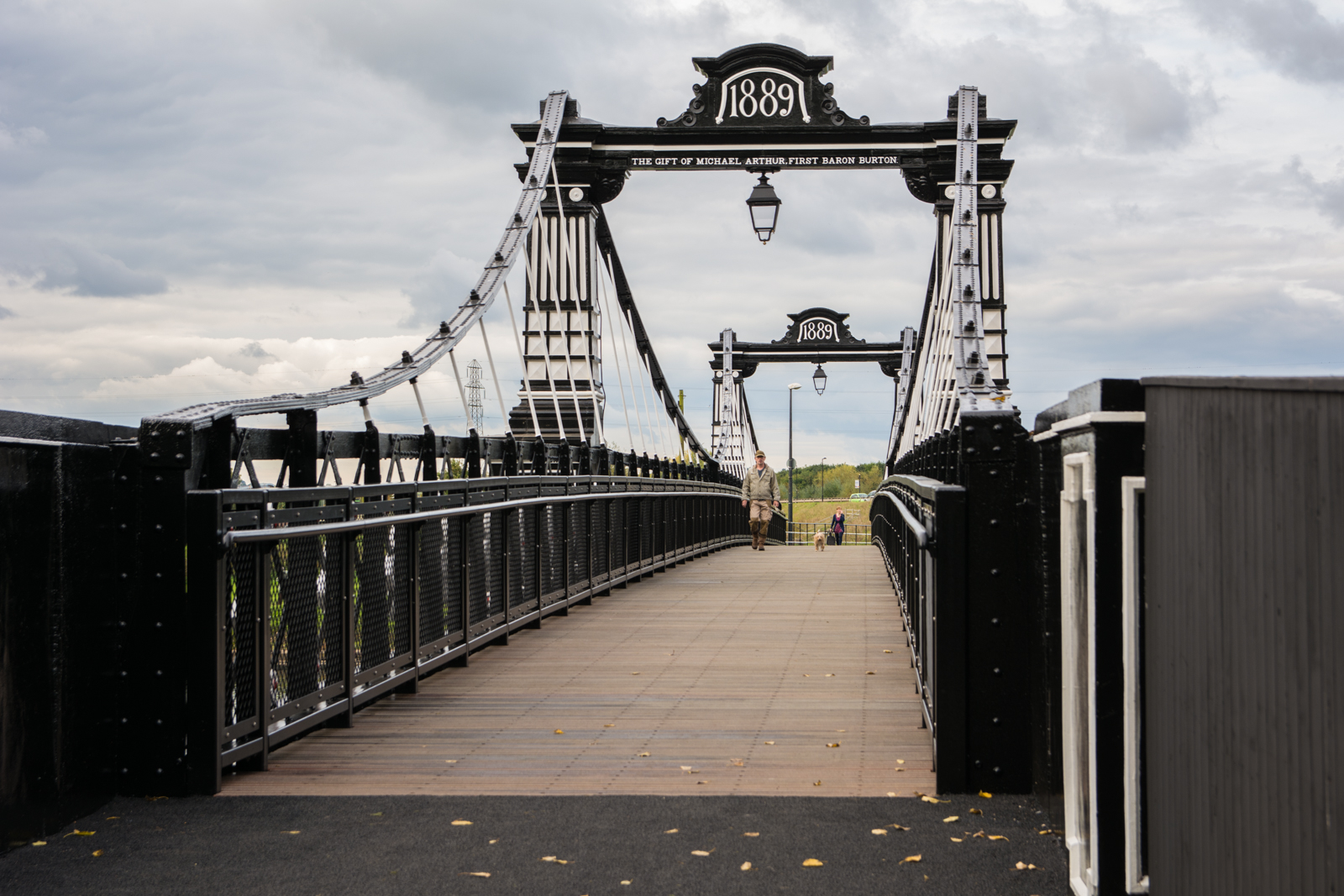
Ferry bridge, after restoration in 2016

Thornewill and Warham Ltd, an engineering company in Burton, was selected to design and build the bridge. The business was founded by iron merchant Thomas Thornewill and his son Francis in 1740; located in Burton's New Street, it made spades and other edged tools. It remained largely focused on hardware manufacture until the 1840s. In 1849, Robert Thornewill (grandson of Thomas) entered into a partnership with John Robson Warham, an engineer from South Shields, and the firm became Thornewill and Warham. By 1862 they were making colliery winding engines, steam engines and locomotives, and within a decade were supplying steam engines to Scotland, London and South Wales.

Apart from the manufacture of steam engines, the company was also notable for its construction engineering; they provided and installed much of the ironwork in the Burton breweries between 1850 and 1890. The construction in 1889 of the Ferry Bridge and the connecting viaduct to Bond End, at a total cost of just over £10,000, was one of the firm's major achievements in that field.

== Bridge design ==
The bridge was designed by Edward William Ives, supported by Alfred Andrew Langley, chief engineer of the Midland Railway.

It is a suspension design, its distinctive feature being that the chains are not anchored at a distance to independent anchorages as they would normally be on a traditional suspension bridge, but are riveted to the ends of the main girders. These chains are made of flat iron bars riveted together, and continuous from one end to the other. This form of construction had not been previously used in bridge construction and the Ferry Bridge was the first bridge in Europe to be built to this specification, and is possibly the only one remaining.

The bridge spans the river in three sections, supported by four cast-iron piers each five feet (150 cm) in diameter. The piers were placed in pairs fifteen feet (4.6 metres) from centre to centre and were sunk to a depth of between twelve and fifteen feet (3.66–4.57 metres) below the marl and sandstone river bed. The pier cylinders were filled with solid concrete and on top of this there was 3 feet (91 cm) of non-porous engineering blue bricks cemented together. Finally, to complete the foundation, there was an ashlar stone bed onto which they were erected.

The centre span of the bridge is 115 feet (35 metres) long and the two symmetric end sections each measure 57 feet (17 metres). The bridge footway is 10 feet (3.0 metres) wide and stands 11 feet (3.4 metres) above the average water level at the centre and 9 feet (2.7 metres) above at each end. The towers, each of which stands 23 feet 6 inches (7.16 metres) high, when first built were cased externally with ornamental cast-iron work and the bases were panelled and decorated with the arms and supporters of Lord Burton, together with his motto – ‘Basis Virtutum Constantia’ (The basis of virtue is constancy). The towers were surmounted with lions rampant each of which carried a wrought iron staff with gilded copper vanes and Lord Burton's monogram.

The towers are 20 feet 3 inches (6.17 metres) high, of wrought-iron lattice work 2 feet 3 1/2 inches (69.9 cm) at the bottom, tapering to 1 foot 4 1/2 inches (41.9 cm) at the top. They were braced together at the top by a lattice girder 11 1/4 inches (29 cm) deep. The girders are continuous from one end of the bridge to the other. The chains are made of flat bars 3 inches (7.6 cm) thick, riveted to the main girders in the middle of the centre span and at the ends of the bridge. The piers and towers are placed outside the main girders, which increases the resistance of the bridge to wind pressure, the distance between the chains being wider at the tower than at the middle and ends of the girders; the hangers are inclined both along and across the bridge.

The suspension "cables" were made from flat wrought iron plates riveted together to give a "cable" eight inches (200 mm) wide by one and a half inches (38 mm) thick.

The lattice girders which tie the towers together are cased with more ornamental iron work bearing the date of the erection of the bridge, 1889 and underneath the ironwork appears the inscription ‘The gift of Michael Arthur First Baron Burton’. The bridge was tested by loading the middle section of the bridge with several tons of old rails and its rigidity was further tested by 20 men from the Staffordshire regiment marching in synchronised double time across the bridge. This latter test was considered, in 1889, to be the most severe test to which a suspension bridge could be exposed.

The footway was originally of red deal (Pinus sylvestris/European Redwood), 3 inches (7.6 cm) higher in the middle than at the sides to ensure water runoff. The bridge was lit by six lamps in total, two Victorian lamps hanging from each of the cross braces between the towers with heavy cast-iron lamp pillars in character, and four more similar lamps affixed to the towers at the ends of the bridge. The total weight of the iron work of the bridge is over 200 tons (203 tonnes).

At both ends of the bridge span the stone substructure on which the superstructure rests was built by Messrs Lowe and Sons, and the carving of the patterns was executed by Mr Hilton of Victoria Street, Burton.

== Official opening ==
The bridge had its grand opening on Wednesday 3 April 1889, an event attended by between 8,000 and 10,000 people, despite the wet and stormy weather. A photograph shows, in the front row, Mrs Harrison, Sir Michael Arthur Bass, Baronet (later Lord Burton), Nellie Bass with Misses Kathleen and Violet Thornewill, daughters of the builder, Mr C. Harrison (Mayor) and Lady Bass.

Following the official opening, Bass announced plans to erect a raised causeway across the meadows join the Ferry Bridge to Burton. A letter dated 9 April 1889 confirmed his proposal; erection of an 81-span iron viaduct, the 'Stapenhill Viaduct, began soon after and it was presented to the town in 1890. This elevated the total cost of the bridge from around £7,000 to £10,000. Today, the viaduct has modern steel decking on the original cast-iron columns.

The total cost of the structure and viaduct, including acquiring the river-crossing monopoly from the Marquis of Anglesey, was in the region of £20,000. Initially, tolls were collected to help recoup costs, but Lord Burton terminated these charges in April 1898.

== Renovations ==
=== 1970s renovation ===
In 1969, the Burton Mail reported that the bridge was in a "serious condition" after 80 years. There was a suggestion that the council (which now owned the bridge) should dismantle it and that a new one be built at a cost of £60,000. Instead, specialists were called in to examine the whole structure. They concluded that the ornamental features and ironwork (described by the borough surveyor of the time as dead weight) were too heavy, were causing excessive stress to the structure, and should be removed. This was done.

The council agreed to renovate the bridge, which was then enshrouded in scaffolding for nearly a year. When this was removed there was public disappointment that the bridge had lost all its embellishments, and that the previous colour scheme of gardenia and plum had been replaced by black and white. Local newspapers reported on the 'Rape of the Ferry Bridge'.

Two of the original cast-iron lions and one of the plaques which had stood on the piers to the bridge are now (2016) on display at the National Brewery Centre in Burton. A few other items removed in 1969 (lamps, etc.) can be found in the gardens and homes of local residents who saved them from the scrapyards.

Following efforts by Burton Civic Society, on 22 June 1979, the bridge was Grade II listed by English Heritage.

=== 2015–2016 renovation ===
In the mid- to late-2000s Burton Civic Society became aware that the bridge structure was deteriorating dramatically and brought this to the attention of both the local East Staffordshire Borough Council (ESBC) and to Staffordshire County Council (SCC), as responsibility for the bridge had passed from ESBC to SCC. Quotations and estimates were obtained for the refurbishment, and for the renovation and replacement of the embellishments that had been removed. However, the overall cost was prohibitive.

There was much public concern that, if left to deteriorate further, the demolition of the bridge and its replacement with a modern structure was again a possibility. Lobbying by the Burton Civic Society continued, and by 2014 – when the bridge celebrated its 125th anniversary – the SCC acknowledged that work on the bridge was imperative. A campaign to restore the bridge was started by a social media group called "Friends of the Ferry Bridge", which had over 400 active members. SCC set up a Working Group to discuss the refurbishment of the bridge with representatives from ESBC, the Environment Agency, Historic England, Burton Civic Society and from the Friends of the Ferry Bridge.

The majority of the refurbishment suggestions made by SCC were immediately accepted by the Group and a planning application for the required works was granted by ESBC. The Friends of the Ferry Bridge were asked to help choose the colours, and chose to maintain the main bridge in black and white with the rosettes or quatrefoils painted with red centres. The local population were advised from June 2015 of the closure of the footbridge which, 126 years since its opening, continued to be the major link between Stapenhill and the town centre.

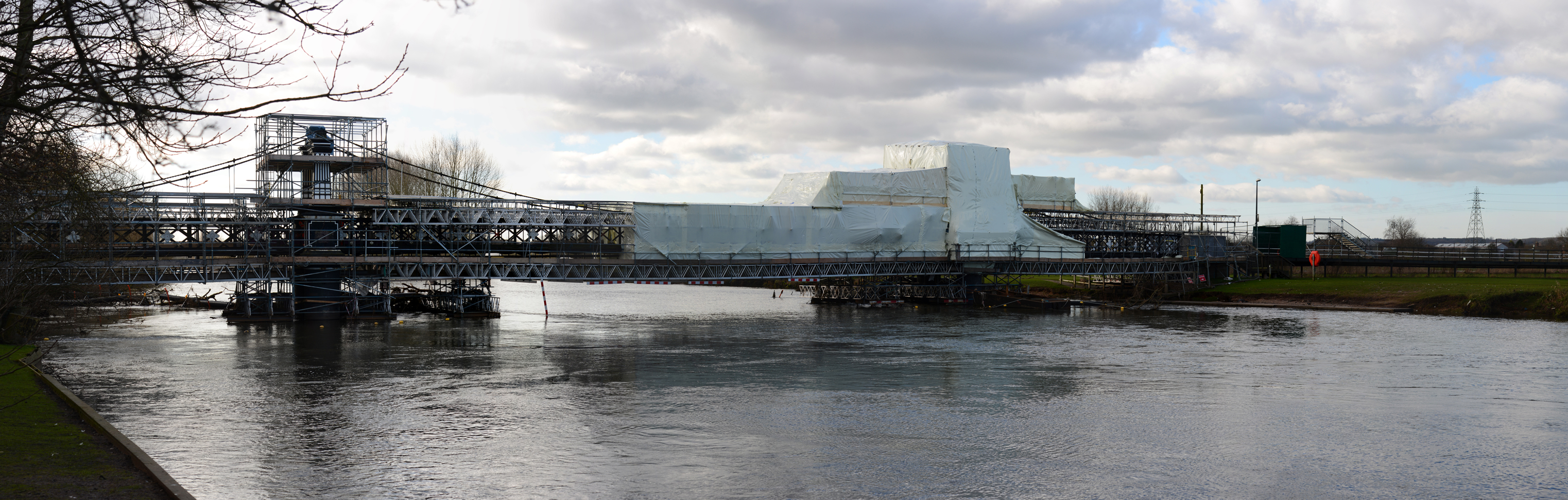
Ferry Bridge undergoing renovation in 2016

Work on the refurbishment started on 7 September 2015 and was due to be completed in about a year, at a cost of around £1 million, and project managed by Amey. The work was hindered by some severe weather conditions, high river levels, gales etc. which affected the ability to carry out the work safely. Due to the extent of the work being undertaken, the bridge was closed, with traffic diverted over the nearby St Peter's Road Bridge. The refurbishment also resulted in a rare cancellation of the Burton Regatta.

The bridge finally reopened on 21 October 2016.

==== Plaque replacement ====
In 1969, prior to the first refurbishment, four heavy cast-iron plaques had been removed from the bridge's four piers. Each was four feet square, featured the arms of the bridge's benefactor Lord Burton, and were had been painted in full colour. Burton Civic Society wanted these to be replaced during the 2015–2016 refurbishment, but after extensive searches the plaques were not found to be in the Council's possession. However, one plaque was found on display at the Museum of Brewing in Burton, and it was established that this could be used to create moulds for lightweight aluminium replacement plaques, but they would have to be made and installed while the contractor's scaffolding was still in place.

Local businessman and Civic Society member George Lawson, who had a keen interest in the bridge as past chairman of Burton Leander Rowing Club and Burton Regatta, approached local aluminium casting company Alpac Alloys who were able to confirm that a new mould could be made from the original. To remove the original plaque by crane from the museum wall, make a mould from it, cast four new plaques in aluminium, paint them in the original colours, and install them on the bridge was estimated to cost £17,400. With no time to organise fundraising, Lawson took on the plaques' production management and paid for them to be made, and they were finished in time for installation while the scaffolding remained. Lawson subsequently organised a fundraising programme in the town and the cost figure of £17,400 was quickly reached.

== Awards ==
The Friends of Ferry Bridge community action group played a major role in pushing forward the restoration project. On 4 November 2016, at the annual "Impact on the Community Awards" ceremony of the Trent and Dove Housing Association held at the Pirelli Stadium, this Group won the "Best Community Project" Award, presented by Sally Gunnell OBE.

On 3 November 2016 at Edgbaston stadium, the Midland Counties region of the Institution of Structural Engineers presented the Ferry Bridge with its award in the Pedestrian Bridge category.

== Love locks ==
Within a few days of the re-opening, a love lock was affixed to the bridge, but it was quickly removed, as such items are unsightly, a hazard, add to the load on the structure, and are not allowed under the Listing Regulations. Any that do get affixed will be removed at once.

== See also ==
- Listed buildings in Stapenhill
