= Paulet High School =

Coordinates: 52°47′24″N 1°36′56″W

Location
- Violet Way; Stapenhill; Burton Upon Trent, Staffordshire, DE15 9RT; England

Information
- Type: Academy
- Motto: Encouraging Achievement in a Positive Environment
- Established: 1903 (1975 as Paulet)
- Founder: Burton Council
- Local authority: Staffordshire
- Trust: John Taylor MAT
- Department for Education URN: 147574 Tables
- Ofsted: Reports
- Headteacher: Ian McArthur
- Staff: 100
- Gender: Mixed
- Age: 11 to 18
- Enrolment: 862
- Colour: Burgundy
- Website: http://www.paulet.co.uk/

Paulet High School is a mixed secondary school and sixth form located in the Stapenhill area of Burton on Trent, Staffordshire, England.

Previously a community school administered by Staffordshire County Council, in February 2020 Paulet High School converted to academy status. The school is now sponsored by the John Taylor MAT.

== Stapenhill Post 16 Centre ==
The idea of a purpose-built sixth form centre shared between the neighbouring Paulet High School and Blessed Robert Sutton Catholic Sports College (now Blessed Robert Sutton Catholic Voluntary Academy) was first discussed in 2001, with a £1-million proposal accepted by planners and school governors in October 2002. Building work on the centre commenced in November 2002. The project was carried out by building contractors Interclass. The sixth form centre opened in September 2003.

The centre was officially opened in March 2004 by Charles Clarke as Secretary of State for Education and Skills.

In January 2010, the centre received a visit from Ed Balls during his service as Secretary of State for Children, Schools and Families.

However, after the shared sixth form provision received a critical report from Ofsted, Blessed Robert Sutton Catholic Sports College decided to split the partnership and offer its own independent sixth form provision. From 2015 Paulet High School has offered its own sixth form provision and is the sole occupant of the sixth form building.

== Notable former pupils ==
- Louie Sibley, footballer

== School Traditions ==
The Crackerdash is a schoolwide, annual competition organised by Paulet High School. It features the involvement of both staff and students across the school. Created by Mark Hipwell, a Mathematics teacher and Engagement Lead at Paulet, it takes place at Christmas time. The name is a portmanteau of "cracker" referring to the Christmas cracker placed on the participant's head and "dash" referring to the competition aspect of the event where students and teachers race to the finish line.

The event is outlined by the following official rules: "Put a cracker on your head and then start to run. It doesn't matter how fast just make sure you have fun. If it falls off your head stop and do three spins. The first over the line gets a Christmas win". The race very much resembles the famous egg-and-spoon race in the sense that the goal is to cross the finish line without dropping an item. However, The Crackerdash uses a Christmas cracker placed on the person's head and if dropped, the participant must complete three full spins before replacing the cracker and continuing the race.

The Crackerdash is also accompanied by an annual song and music video. These videos are created by Mark Hipwell and Chris Ryder (music teacher and head of performing arts at Paulet). Their first published song, titled "Crackerdash 2022", is available on YouTube along with the other published videos.

"Crackerdash 2022" the initial song made to accompany the inaugural race.

"Crackerdash 2023" the second installment, which features a variety of Paulet staff members.

"Crackerdash 2024" the third released song, featuring videos of stop-motion animation derived from SunBrickStudios' Crackerdash Origins, designed to accompany the 2024 Crackerdash.

"Crackerdash 2025" the song to accompany the 2025 Crackerdash event.

The videos were originally published on a separate channel but were later re-uploaded in November 2025 onto the "Energising Learning" channel, with the release of the 2025 Crackerdash song.

The race also inspired other media creations such as SunBrickStudios' video, "Crackerdash Origins" on YouTube. This Lego stop-motion animation was inspired by the Christmas race and details the origins of how it came about. This movie is a work of fiction and so does not entail how the real event came to be. However, the short Christmas film depicts the two creators of the Crackerdash songs, Mark Hipwell and Chris Ryder.
