= William Ashmole =

English footballer

Personal information
- Full name: William George Ashmole
- Date of birth: 1892
- Place of birth: Winshill, England
- Date of death: 1968 (aged 75–76)
- Place of death: Winshill, England
- Height: 5 ft 7 in (1.70 m)
- Position: Winger

Senior career*
Years	Team	Apps	(Gls)
1912–1913	Burton United		
1913–1919	Stockport County	37	(9)
1919–19??	Watford		
- * Club domestic league appearances and goals

William George Ashmole (1892–1968) was an English footballer who played as a winger for Burton United, Stockport County, and Watford.

== Career ==
Ashmole played for Burton United and Stockport County. During World War I he played as a guest for West Ham United, Watford, and Port Vale. He played for Watford after the war.

== Career statistics ==
Appearances and goals by club, season and competition
Club	Season	League			FA Cup		Total	
Club	Season	Division	Apps	Goals	Apps	Goals	Apps	Goals
Stockport County	1913–14	Second Division	21	8	0	0	21	8
Stockport County	1914–15	Second Division	16	1	0	0	16	1
Stockport County	Total		37	9	0	0	37	9
