= St Mark's, Winshill =

Coordinates: 52°48′30″N 1°36′17″W

St Mark's Church, Winshill
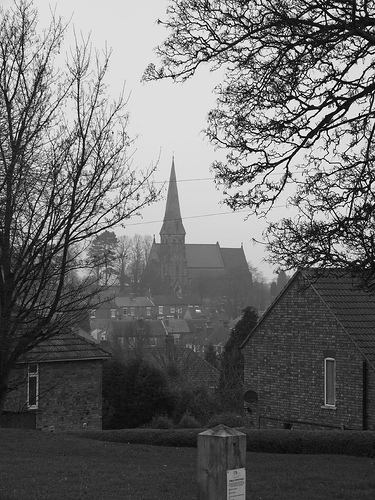
- A view of St Mark's from the south
- St Mark's Church, Winshill
- Denomination: Church of England
- Website: https://www.stmarkswinshill.co.uk

History
- Dedication: St Mark

Administration
- Province: Province of Canterbury
- Diocese: Diocese of Derby

Clergy
- Vicar: Rev. Philip Bosher

St Mark's is the Church of England parish church for the Burton upon Trent suburb of Winshill, east of the town. It is part of the Diocese of Derby.

Built to the west of Winshill and commanding a prominent spot high above Burton upon Trent, St Mark's is a landmark that can be seen for miles along the valley of the River Trent. It is a Grade II listed building.

St Mark's church was opened in 1869. It consists of nave and aisles, chancel and south-west tower with broach-spire in the Gothic Revival style. The church was designed by Edward Holmes and paid for by the brewer John Gretton of Bladon House (d. 1867). It served a district chapelry, established within Holy Trinity ecclesiastical parish in 1867 and covering the whole of Winshill. Because it was still in Derbyshire, Winshill was originally part of the Archdeaconry of Derby which transferred in 1884 from the Diocese of Lichfield to the newly created diocese of the Diocese of Southwell when that diocese was created in 1884. On 7 July 1927 the archdeaconries of Derby and Chesterfield became the Diocese of Derby.

== Additional information ==
The church is paired with St Wystan's in Bretby and every month that has 5 weeks both churches do a combined service.

== Burials ==
First World War hero William Harold Coltman VC, DCM and Bar, MM and Bar, is buried in the churchyard with his wife Eleanor.

== Bells ==
The tower has a peal of six bells, struck by Taylor's of Loughborough, which range from D at 7.5 cwt to F at 18.5 cwt. The total weight of the bells is 67 cwt 2 qrs 9 lbs. They are rung each Sunday, and for weddings, funerals, and by visiting campanologists.

== Gallery ==
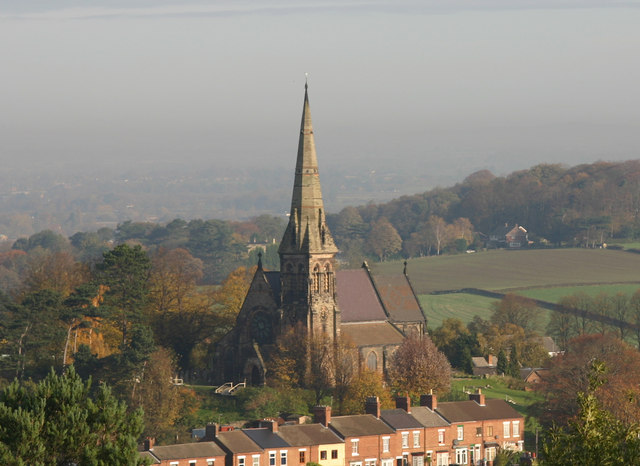
St Mark's Church

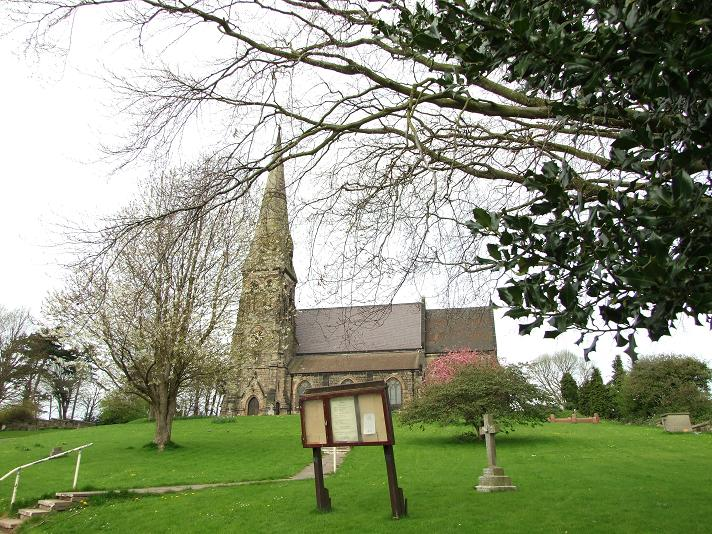
The view from the eastern gates of St Mark's
