= Burton upon Trent Flour Mills =

Former mill in Winshill, Staffordshire, England

Burton Flour Mills
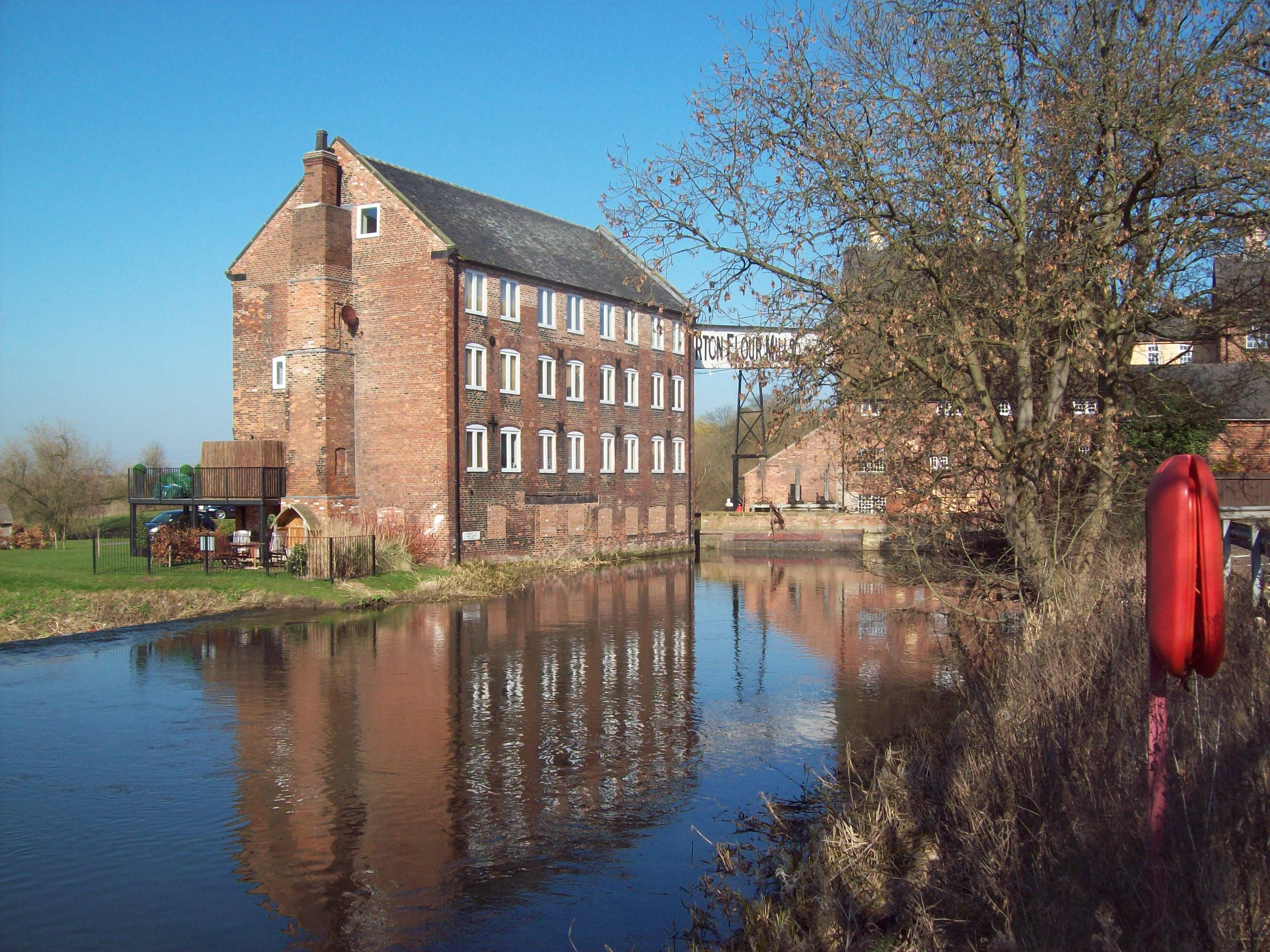
- Burton Flour Mills in 2011
- Country: United Kingdom
- Location: Winshill, Staffordshire, England
- Coordinates: 52°48′47.5″N 1°36′44″W
- Commission date: 1997

Thermal power station
- Turbine technology: Hydroelectric

Power generation
- Nameplate capacity: 160 kW

External links
- Commons: Related media on Commons

Burton Flour Mills is a Grade II listed building now used for residential purposes and a hydro-electric power plant on the River Trent in Winshill, Staffordshire.

== Burton Mill ==
The mill dates from the early 19th century and incorporates a malthouse. It includes the late medieval masonry remains of the corn mill operated by Burton Abbey. A stone tablet can be seen with the date of rebuilding stated as 1745.

In 1730 Henry Paget, 1st Earl of Uxbridge leased the Winsill Mills to the Hayne family for a rent of £120 (equivalent to £22,300 in 2025) per annum. In 1780 the Hayne Family sub-let the Fulling Mill to Robert Peel. Later the lease was taken over by Henry Evans and then Joseph Wilson "The Miller", who ran the Corn Mill until it was sold in 1887 to Thomas Greensmith, who built a steam-powered mill in 1889 and installed turbines in 1906. A mill building powered solely by electricity was added in 1937.

The business was sold in 1989 to Keith Baxter. Milling ceased in May 1992. One of the directors, Frederick Baxter, was taken to court over the illegal removal of machinery from a listed building. He was fined £3,000 and the company £6,000.

The building was saved from demolition and converted for residential use with 7 homes and 16 apartments use by BiDesign Architecture.

== Hydro electric power plant ==
The power plant was installed by Derwent Hydro in 1997
