= Winshill =

Village in Staffordshire, England

Coordinates: 52.8350°N 1.6210°W

- Location within Staffordshire
- Population: 8,466 (2011)
- OS grid reference: SK267234
- District: East Staffordshire
- Shire county: Staffordshire
- Region: West Midlands
- Country: England
- Sovereign state: United Kingdom
- Post town: BURTON-ON-TRENT
- Postcode district: DE15
- Dialling code: 01283
- Police: Staffordshire
- Fire: Staffordshire
- Ambulance: West Midlands
- UK Parliament: Burton and Uttoxeter

Winshill is a village to the east of the town of Burton upon Trent, in the borough of East Staffordshire, England.

Flanked to the north and east by the South Derbyshire border, historically the parish of Winshill had always been part of Derbyshire until it was transferred to Staffordshire, in part in 1878, and wholly in 1894.

Along its southern flank runs the A511, known locally as the Ashby Road, from Bretby Lane and Moat Bank (Burton upon Trent's highest point) to the eastern end of the Trent Bridge and the junction with the A444.

Along its western flank are the River Trent and the B5008 Newton Road, which runs to Newton Solney and Repton in South Derbyshire.

The parish church in Winshill is St Mark's, part of the Diocese of Derby.

== History ==
The name Winshill has its origin in Old English and means Wine's hill. There was a settlement here in the late 11th century when William I installed privileged tenants at Winshill. By the end of the 18th century the village was grouped around a green on the east side of the hill. The medieval Burton bridge crossed into Winshill at its east end, and the road to Ashby-de-la-Zouch then followed a line along Bearwood Hill Road and High Bank Road. A tollgate was placed near the foot of Bearwood Hill Road when it became a turnpike road in 1753. The Ashby Road was put onto a more direct line in the later 1830s and the tollgate was placed near Moat Bank.

Burton Flour Mill on the Winshill bank of the River Trent is a listed building. It dates back to the medieval corn mill of Burton Abbey. In the 14th century a fulling mill – which became a cotton mill in the late 18th century - was built on an island nearby. Burton Mill was rebuilt after a fire in 1745, and again in the 19th century.

Winshill was popular in the 19th century with prosperous citizens of Burton who built large houses like Bladon House, The Woodlands, Highfield House and Moat Bank on the higher ground overlooking the town. At the same time rows of houses were being built for brewery workers on Bearwood Hill, Ashby Road and Alexandra Road.

A school was opened at the north end of the village in 1846, and a Methodist chapel opened in 1845. The church of St Mark's was built in 1868, on a prominent site on the top of the hill overlooking the developing village. Almshouses were built in Hawfield Lane in 1887, endowed by William Wardle, and another almshouse built on Wheatley Lane in 1925, endowed by Harriet Walton Jefford.

In 1921 the Board of Education purchased "The Woodlands" property to provide a new campus for Burton Girls High School. This became incorporated into the comprehensive Abbot Beyne School in 1975.

== Commerce ==
Pubs in Winshill include:

- The Anglesey (refurbished November 2014),
- The Jubilee,
- The Nelson (closed, demolished and housing built on the site 2015/2016),
- The Sump, (refurbished early 2014)
- The Swan (closed and refurbished as flats and car park built on in 2014),
- The Traveller's Rest (closed and demolished April 2008), and
- The Waterloo.

== People from Winshill ==
- Abraham Bass (1804–1882) a cricketer known as 'the father of Midland cricket', lived at Moat Bank, Ashby Road, Winshill
- Henry Wardle (1832–1892) a British brewer and Liberal MP for South Derbyshire 1885-1892.
- Sir Francis Ley (1846–1916) founded Baseball in Derby and a large foundry.
- Robert George Tomlinson (1869–1949) an English brewer and cricketer who played for Derbyshire between 1891 and 1893 and was later umpire in first-class matches in Scotland.
- Vice-Admiral Thomas Erskine Wardle (1877–1944) a senior officer in the Royal Navy, the Rear-Admiral Commanding His Majesty's Australian Fleet 1924-1926
- William Harold Coltman (1891–1974) Victoria Cross recipient, taught in the Sunday School in Winshill and is buried in the graveyard of the Winshill parish church of St Mark's. The Coltman VC Peace Wood is at Mill Hill Lane, Winshill
- William Ashmole (1892 Winshill – 1968) an English footballer who played 37 games for Stockport County
- William Tomlinson (1901 in Winshill – 1984) schoolmaster and cricketer who played first-class cricket for Derbyshire and Cambridge University from 1920 to 1924.
- Jackie Stamps (1918 – 1991 in Winshill) an English footballer who scored two goals in the 1946 FA Cup Final for Derby County in a 4-1 win against Charlton Athletic.
- Paddy Considine (born 1973) English actor, filmmaker, and musician. He grew up with his brother and sisters in a council estate in Winshill

== See also ==
- Listed buildings in Winshill

== Local images ==
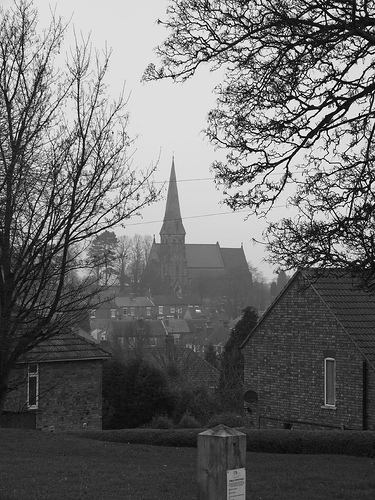
St Mark's - Winshill's parish church

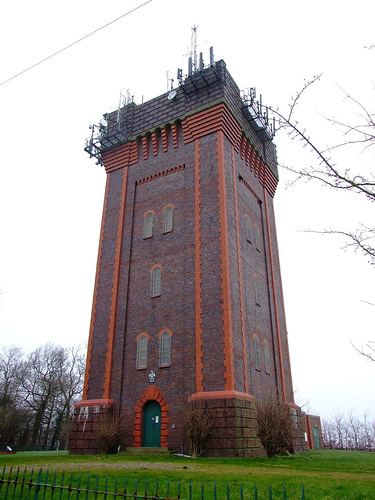
Waterloo Clump - Winshill Water Tower

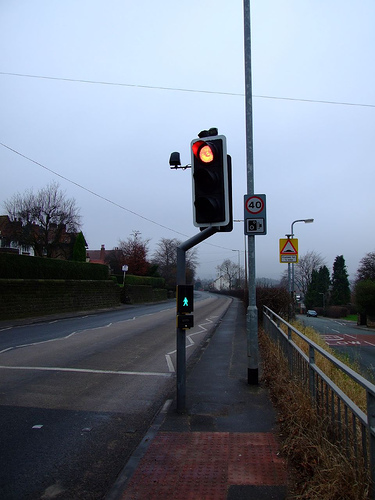
A511 Ashby Road - looking west downhill towards Burton upon Trent

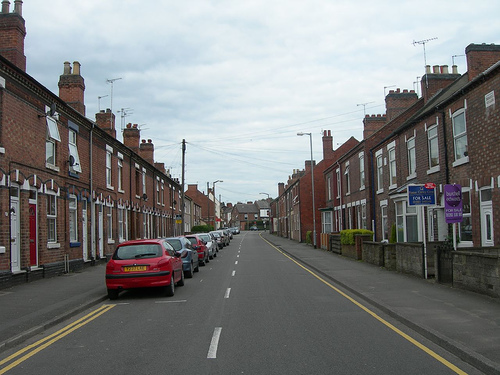
Bearwood Hill Road - major thoroughfare into the centre of Winshill
