= St Peter's Church, Stapenhill =

Church in Staffordshire, England

St Peter's, Stapenhill
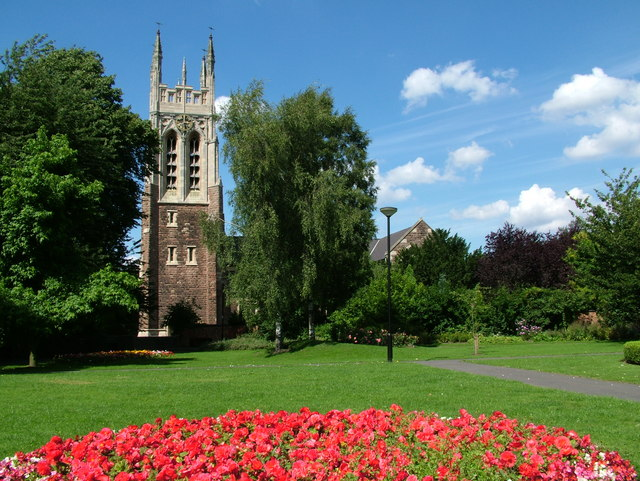
- From the south, including the south-west tower and, at right, the south chapel
- St Peter's, Stapenhill
- 52°47′46″N 1°37′23″W
- Denomination: Church of England
- Churchmanship: Conservative evangelical
- Website: St Peter's webpage

Administration
- Province: Province of Canterbury
- Diocese: Diocese of Derby
- Archdeaconry: Derby and South Derbyshire
- Deanery: Mercia
- Parish: Stapenhill (including Cauldwell)

Clergy
- Bishop: Bishop of Ebbsfleet (provincial episcopal visitor)

St Peter's is a Church of England parish church in Burton upon Trent in Staffordshire, England. A church has stood on the site since the mediaeval period and it possibly has Anglo-Saxon origins. The current structure dates from 1881 when the church was completely rebuilt. The mediaeval font was discovered and reinstalled in the church in 1973. The parish formerly included several settlements in south Derbyshire but retains only Cauldwell. The parish was part of the Diocese of Lichfield until 1884 and was then within the Diocese of Southwell until 1927 when the parish was transferred to the Diocese of Derby. The advowson of the church belongs to the Church Society and it belongs to the conservative evangelical tradition. The church has made a resolution C declaration, objecting to oversight by clergy who have ordained female priests and so comes under the oversight of a provincial episcopal visitor, currently the Bishop of Ebbsfleet.

== Earlier churches on the site ==
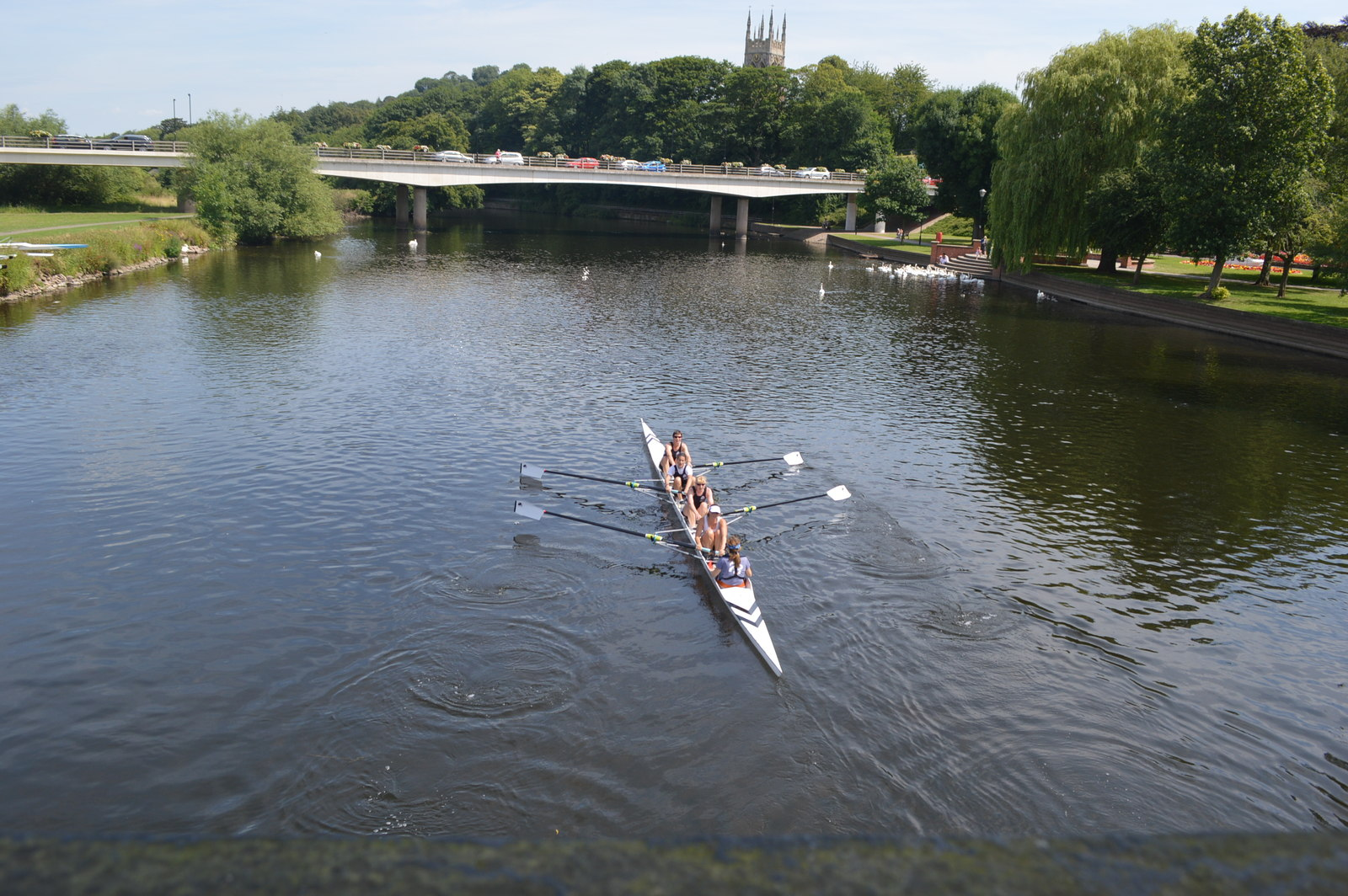
The church in context with the nearby River Trent and Saint Peter's Bridge

There has been a church on the site since at least the mediaeval period. The church had a chancel, nave (probably with an aisle on the north side) and a two-stage tower on the west end with a crenelated parapet dating largely to the 13th century. This church retained some earlier features including a chancel arch possibly of Anglo-Saxon origin. By the 16th century this church was dedicated to Saint Peter; this is an indication of a possible Anglo-Saxon origin as this dedication was common for churches of that era.

By 1665 there was a vicarage of two bays, enlarged to four bays in 1698. Around 1780 the nave and tower were demolished and replaced with a new structure consisting of a nave (without aisle) and western bell turret, funded by local subscription. The chancel remained untouched, likely because the repair liability lay with the Paget family who refused to provide funding.

A gallery was added to the north side of the nave in 1821. Vicar John Clay funded extensive rebuilding works in the 1830s. This included a new vicarage, the old structure having fallen into ruin by 1813. Clay also contracted Henry Isaac Stevens to design and construct a new nave, south porch and a new tower. Stevens was also contracted in the early 1860s to demolish the old chancel and form a new one by extending the nave eastwards.

== Current structure ==
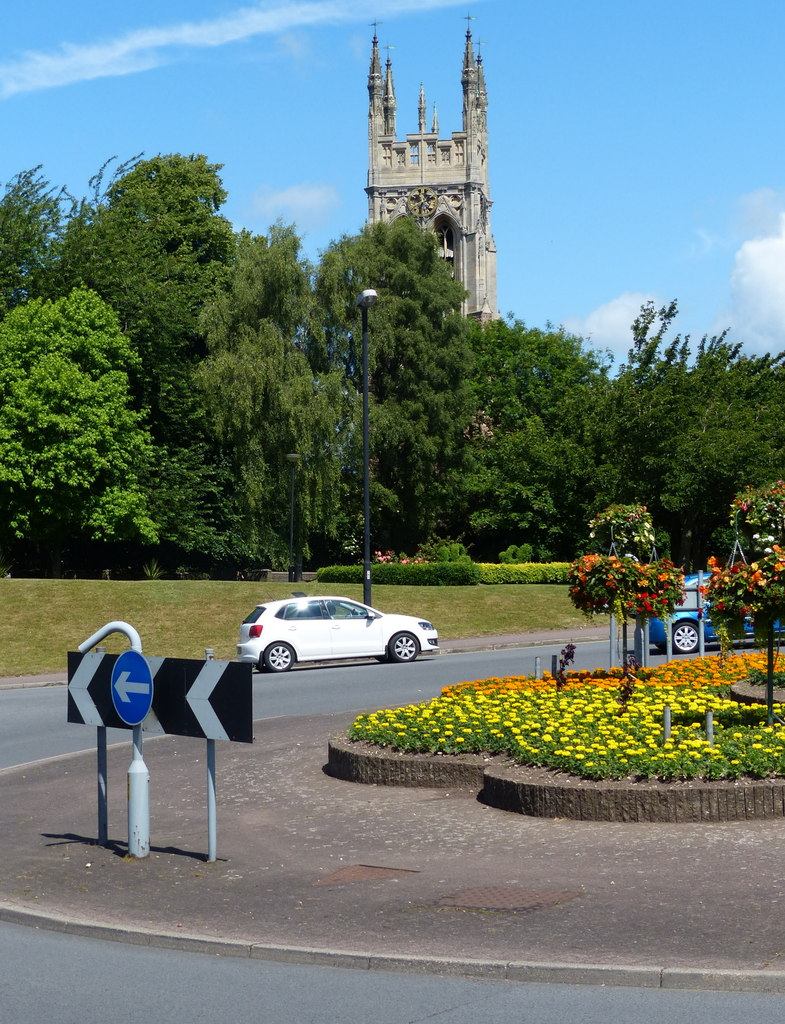
View of the church tower from Saint Peter's roundabout

By 1881 an increase in the parish's population necessitated an expansion of the church and it was re-built with funding from the family of Clay and prominent Brewers of Burton. The layout, designed by the Nottingham architecture firm Evans & Jolly, has a relatively short chancel with north and south transepts, a large nave with north and south aisles and a square tower at the south-west. The burial ground around the church was out of use by 1882, possibly following the opening of the nearby municipal Stapenhill Cemetery, opened in 1866.

In the early 20th century the south chapel and chancel were refitted in the Art Nouveau style. At the same time the organ was moved from the west end of the nave into the north transept and a new font, of marble in art nouveau style, installed. The church's mediaeval font, known to have been discarded sometime after 1821, was discovered in a farmyard and reinstalled in the church in 1973. Clay's vicarage was sold by the church in the late 1960s and a new vicarage constructed to the west, which remains in use.

=== Architectural description ===
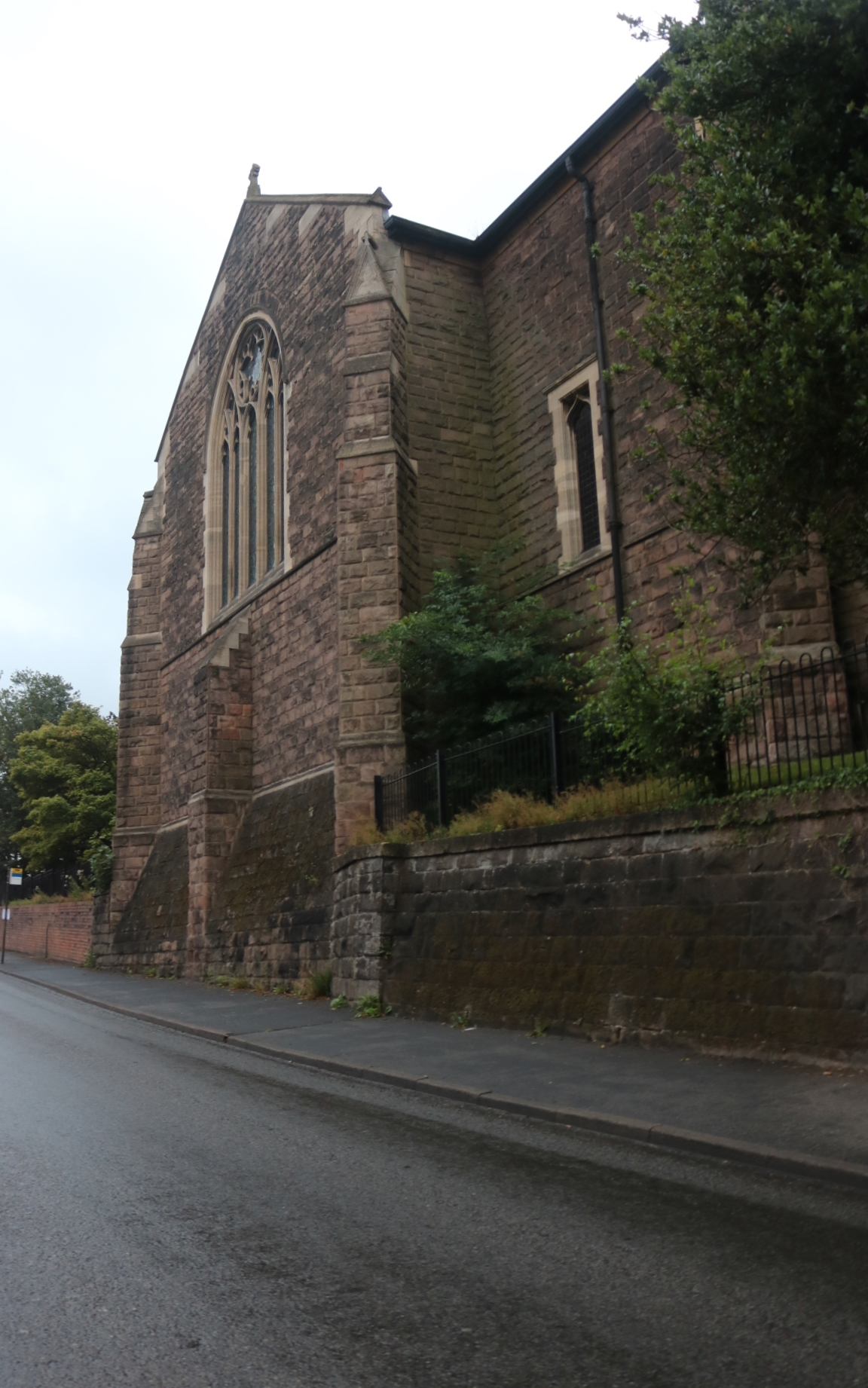
East end of the chancel (including the significant plinth), north organ chamber at right

The church is built from rough-faced Derbyshire sandstone with features detailed in dressed limestone (Bath stone and Ancaster stone). The structure is built in the Perpendicular Gothic Revival style. The nave is of five bays and has an aisle on both the north and south sides. The aisles have square-topped openings containing ogee-shaped windows in groups of three; above these the clerestory has smaller openings grouped in pairs in each bay. The west wall has a large pair of pointed windows either side of a central buttress. A door on the north aisle has been blocked up. There is a porch at the centre of the south aisle with an entrance with stone moulding.

The south part of the transept houses a lady chapel, the north part an organ chamber and vestry. Both parts have pairs of tall 2-light windows on their ends (north and south) and single small windows on their east walls. The eastern window of the lady chapel is a memorial dating to 1908. The small chancel sits on a tall plinth as the ground at the east falls away sharply to Stapenhill Road. The east end of the chancel holds a 5-light, intricately detailed stained glass window depicting Christ and a number of saints; it probably dates to 1881. The roof of the church is slate throughout except for the aisles which are lead.

The square tower is located at the south side of the west end of the nave and incorporates the main entrance in its south wall, surrounded by stone moulding detail, and an internal porch. The tower has three stages, the lower two in the same rough-faced sandstone as the rest of the church and the upper stage in smooth-faced limestone. Diagonal buttresses on each corner extend to the bottom of the upper stage. There is a single window on the west face of the lower stage and two tiers of small, square-topped windows in the middle stage. The upper stage is the most grand; each face has a pair of tall pointed gabled windows, above which are central clock faces with trefoil details surrounding them. The roof has a battlement parapet with open tracery detail, each corner has a large pinnacle and there is a smaller pinnacle in the centre of each face of the parapet. The tower holds a single bell, dating to 1796. The structure was granted statutory protection as a grade II listed building on 24 March 1950.

=== Interior features ===
The church has a large interior. The aisles have arcades dividing them from the nave, there are five arches on the north aisle and four on the south, due to the location of the tower. The arches are supported on octagonal piers, which also support some arches connecting to the outside wall of the aisles. The arches leading into the transept are taller and wider than the others and have more detailed moulding. The nave and chancel have a hammerbeam roof with steel connecting rods. The ceiling is covered with wooden panelling down to the level of the clerestory. The walls are plastered and the main floor is tiled. The pews sit on raised sections of wooden parquet flooring and the sanctuary has a black and white marble floor.

The mediaeval font is fitted on a modern stem and the more modern one is made from alabaster. The pews are wooden as are the pulpit and choir stalls, which have intricate Gothic tracery detail. The communion rail has a band of quatrefoil details and the reredos has blind Gothic-style panels. The organ chamber and lady chapel are screened by wooden panelling. The reredos in the lady chapel is in marble surmounted by details of trumpet-carrying angels.

The lower stage of the tower displays an alabaster slab taken from the tomb of William Dethick (d. 1497) and his wife Margaret that lay in the chancel of the mediaeval church. Also in the tower is a monument to Susanna Inge (d. 1720). Other memorials in the church date from the 18th to the 20th centuries. The church holds registers dating back to 1679.

== Parish organisation ==
The church at Stapenhill might have been a minster by the 11th century as it maintained subsidiary chapels at Drakelow, Heathcote (a lost settlement near modern Stanton) and Newhall. A further chapel was operating at Cauldwell by 1280 and another perhaps may have operated at Brizlincote in the 14th century. Stanton, Newhall and Drakelow were transferred out of the parish by 1650 (into Church Gresley) but Cauldwell remains part of the parish. Some properties within the boundaries of the parish, including a number a houses and Brizlincote Hall Farm, were considered part of the St Modwen's (Burton upon Trent) parish as they had belonged to Burton Abbey. The Abbey was subject to the 16th-century dissolution of the monasteries and a parliamentary commission of 1650 recommended integrating these properties into St Peter's parish but this was not achieved until 1864. In 1996 the southern part of Stapenhill, where a new housing estate had been constructed, was separated into a new parish around the Immanuel Church, built in 1963.

The parish was part of the Church of England Diocese of Lichfield until 1884 when it was transferred to the newly established Diocese of Southwell. In 1927 the parish was transferred to the Diocese of Derby. Following the Priests (Ordination of Women) Measure 1993, which first permitted the ordination of women priests in the church the parish declared it would become a resolution C parish, that objected to oversight by bishops who had participated in the ordination of women. As such it is overseen by a provincial episcopal visitor, a bishop who has not ordained women, initially the role was fulfilled by the Bishop of Maidstone. The current provincial episcopal visitor is the Bishop of Ebbsfleet. The parish remains in the Diocese of Derby for disciplinary purposes. Formally the parish is "Stapenhill (including Caldwell)", within the Mercia Deanery inside the Derby and South Derbyshire Archdeaconry.

The church belongs to the conservative evangelical tradition of the Church of England. The congregation held a vote of no confidence in the incumbent vicar in 2017, following allegations of bullying by both sides. A former churchwarden brought a complaint against the vicar under the Clergy Discipline Measure in 2018, but the case was dismissed by the Bishop of Derby, after a failed attempt at reconciliation. The vicar resolved to leave in 2018 but had not done so by 2021.

== Advowson ==
The advowson of the church was granted to Burton Abbey in the 11th century. In this role the Abbey received the rector's (or greater) tithes principally of corn and the income from the subsidiary chapels. The appointed vicar received the lesser tithes of hay and some other produce. The vicar also received a vicarage and income from glebe land. In 1291 the total income was £15 13s 4d. By 1535 the Abbey's share was worth £10 a year and the vicar received 13s from the glebe, 16s from the lesser tithes and 21s in offerings. By this point the vicar seems to have been assigned income from the chapels as he received £3 6s 8d from Newhall.

After the 16th-century dissolution of the monasteries the advowson was assigned to the Paget family as lords of the manor of Burton. In 1650 the annual income was £42 6s 8d a year plus £5 from Cauldwell. By the end of that century the contributions from each subsidiary chapel (by then Cauldwell, Stanton and Newhall) was increased to £6 a year on the agreement that the vicar preached at Cauldwell at least once a month. In 1707 the income for the vicar was £31 from the glebe and £12 3s from the chapels. Owen Lloyd, vicar from 1768 to 1813, brought a dispute over the Cauldwell contribution before the House of Lords in 1777 and won the rights to tithes there, worth £40 a year. His successor attempted to argue the same for Stanton and Newhall in 1815 but lost as the contributions from these chapels were judged to be a pension and not a payment in lieu of tithes. By 1831 the vicar's income had risen to £373, probably a result of the renting of glebe land for brickmaking, and he was able to pay £93 a year to a curate to preach at Cauldwell. In 1925 the advowson was transferred to the Church Association (now merged into the Church Society) who are the current holders. Tithes payable to clergy were abolished nationwide in 1936.
