= St Peter's Bridge, Burton upon Trent =

St Peter's Bridge
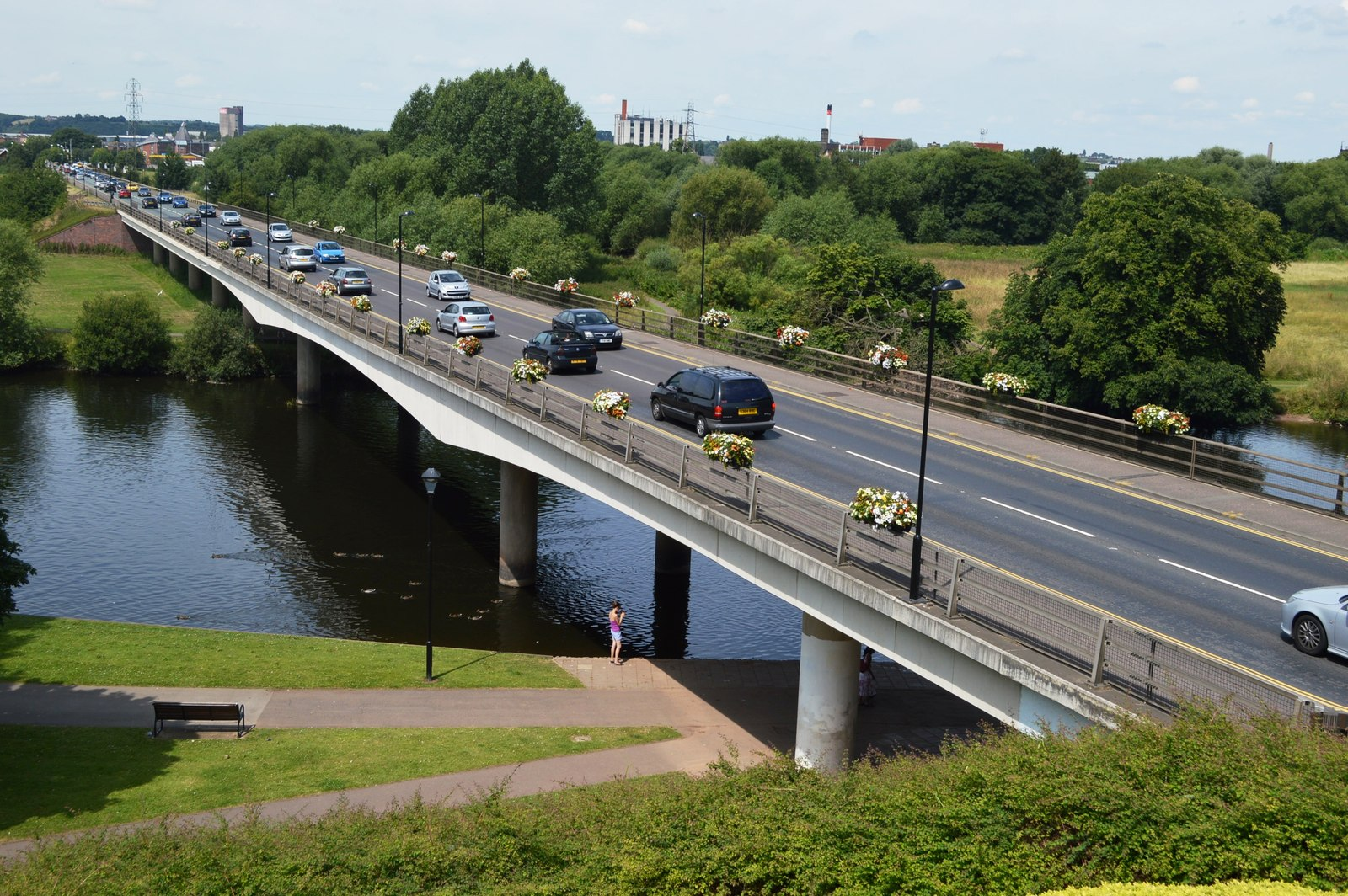
- View of the bridge from the south-east
- Coordinates: 52.7955°N 1.6250°W
- Carries: A5189 road
- Crosses: River Trent
- Owner: Staffordshire County Council

Characteristics
- Material: Reinforced concrete
- Total length: 800 metres (2,600 ft)
- No. of spans: Nine
- Piers in water: Two
- Clearance below: 4–5m
- No. of lanes: Single carriageway

History
- Opened: 1985

Statistics
- Daily traffic: 24,000 vehicles

Location
- Interactive map of St Peter's Bridge

St Peter's Bridge carries the A5189 road across the River Trent in Burton upon Trent, Staffordshire, England. Opened in 1985, the 800-metre (2,600 ft) long reinforced concrete bridge is the most recent road crossing of the Trent. It was closed for more than two months in 2017 for major repair works.

== Description ==
St Peter's Bridge crosses the River Trent between Burton and Stapenhill, carrying the A5189 road. It was built between 1983 and 1985 to alleviate traffic flows on the Burton Bridge, 1.3 kilometres (0.81 mi) to the north, is crossed by around 24,000 vehicles a day. The owner, Staffordshire County Council, originally considered it to comprise five separate structures: the western approach embankment with flood relief culverts; the western section of bridge ("Pumphouse Viaduct") over the Washlands, a flood plain; the main span across the river; the portion on the eastern bank ("Stapenhill Underpass") and a footbridge ("St Peter's Footbridge") which crosses over the structure on the Stapenhill side. Since April 2009 the main bridge has been assessed as a single structure, with the footbridge and approach as ancillary structures. The bridge is named for the nearby parish church of Stapenhill. The structure is the newest road crossing of the Trent and one of only three to have been built since 1915 (the others being the M180 motorway and A50 road).

St Peter's Bridge is 800 m (2,600 ft) long overall and of reinforced concrete construction. There are nine spans between eight sets of piers (each of which comprises two concrete columns) which are on piled foundations. The spans on the Pumphouse Viaduct are between 11.64 and 17 metres (38.2 and 55.8 ft) in length and the main river span is 40 metres (130 ft). The river span is formed from a central 17-metre (56 ft) prestressed concrete section which is simply supported on two sections that cantilever from the adjacent bridge piers. Bearings on top of the piers allow for movements of the bridge deck above under traffic loading and temperature variations.

The deck is also of reinforced concrete construction and contains large voids which were formed by the use of polystyrene blocks. Headroom below the bridge is between 4 and 5 metres (13 and 16 ft). Holes were formed through the deck for the drainage of surface water. The bridge abutments are reinforced concrete faced with engineering bricks. The eastern abutment is faced by a slope paved with concrete slabs. The road over the bridge is 7.3 metres (24 ft) wide and has a footway on either side with steel parapets which also support street lighting columns.

== 2017 repairs ==
The bridge bearings had not been replaced since construction and those at the eastern end were recommended for replacement in 2010 after an inspection identified corrosion caused by the ingress of water via a leaking expansion joint in the deck above. If no action had been taken the bridge would have to have had a weight restriction imposed in 2019 and be taken out of service in 2024.

The bridge was closed from 29 August 2017 to carry out repairs to more than 80 individual bearings as well as full rewaterproofing of the deck. A new road surface was also laid and expansion joints replaced. The extensive nature of the work required a full closure and traffic was diverted via Burton Bridge. Pedestrians and cyclists were diverted over the nearby Ferry Bridge. The works formed part of a £6.1 million package, together with repairs carried out to Burton Bridge in 2018. The bridge reopened ahead of schedule on 11 November 2017.

== Gallery ==
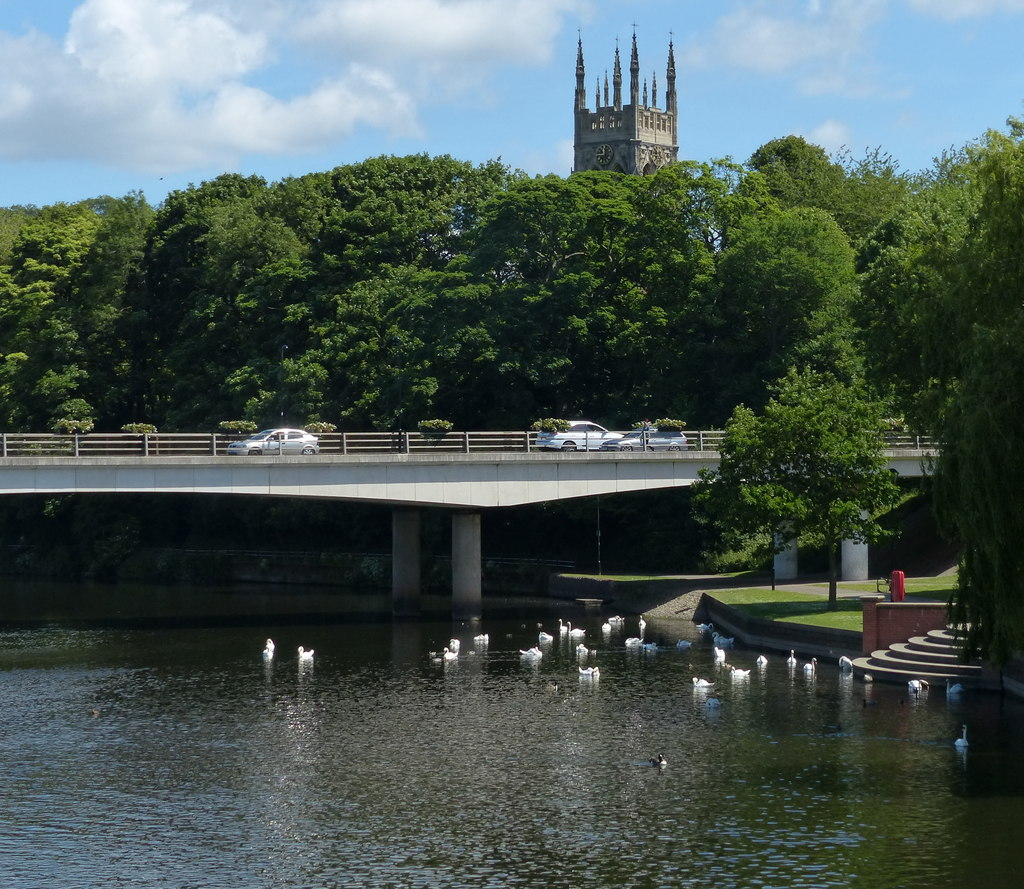
View from the south-west

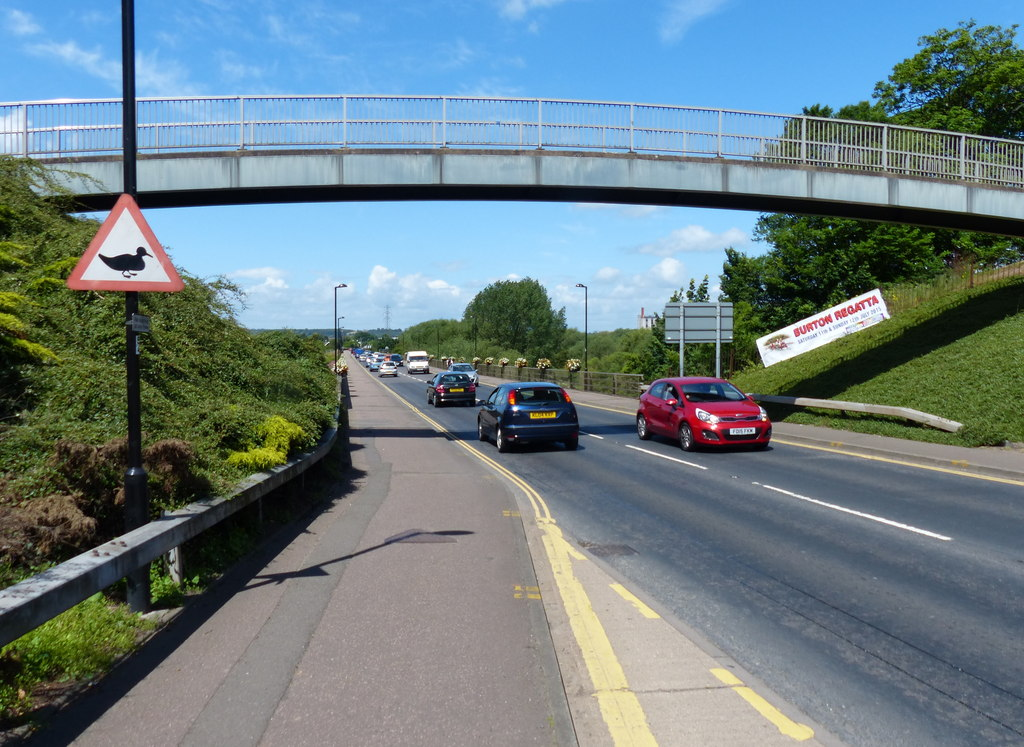
Stapenhill footbridge

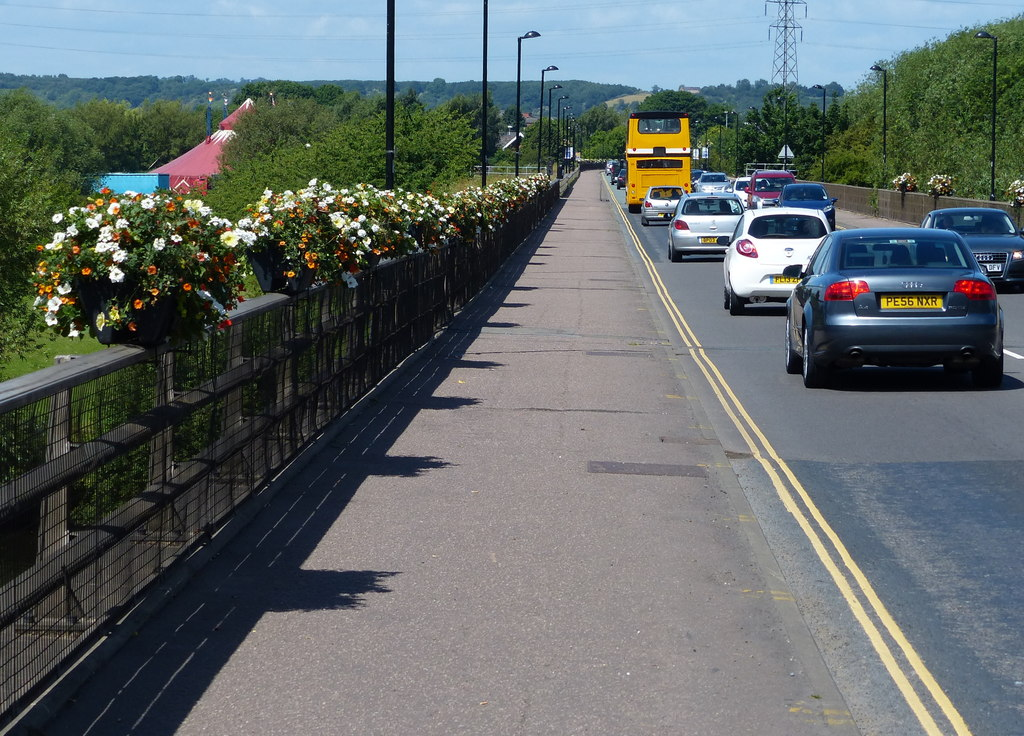
view of the deck
