= Stapenhill =

Village in Staffordshire, England

Coordinates: 52.795°N 1.621°W

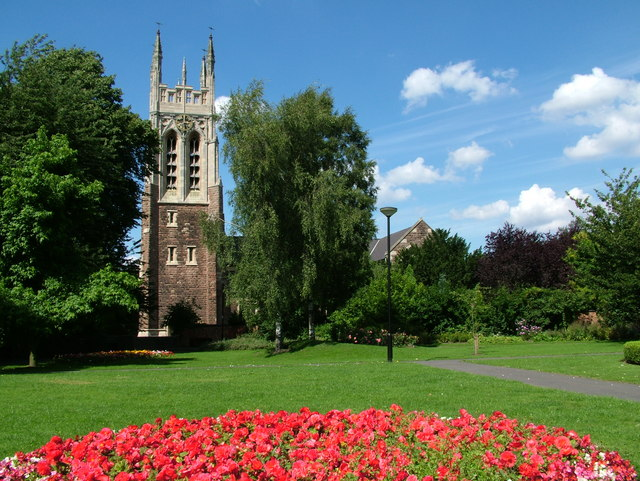
- St Peter's Church, Stapenhill

- Location within Staffordshire
- OS grid reference: SK257220
- District: East Staffordshire
- Shire county: Staffordshire
- Region: West Midlands
- Country: England
- Sovereign state: United Kingdom
- Post town: BURTON-ON-TRENT
- Postcode district: DE15
- Dialling code: 01283
- Police: Staffordshire
- Fire: Staffordshire
- Ambulance: West Midlands
- UK Parliament: Burton and Uttoxeter

Stapenhill is a village and civil parish in Burton upon Trent, Staffordshire, England.

== History ==
Stapenhill was a small village owned by Nigel of Stafford as far back as 1086, however, this ancient parish area has long since been surrounded by new housing developments and gradually absorbed into the Burton urban area. Stapenhill was known for its brickyards in the 18th and 19th centuries. The Ratcliff brewery family provided public baths (since demolished) for Stapenhill in the 1870s, and homes for local workers in Balfour Street and Craven Street.

The village is east of the Trent, and thus was administered as part of Derbyshire from at least 1086 until the Local Government Act 1888, when it passed into Staffordshire as a result of boundary changes. The boundaries of the original ancient village were Rosliston Road, Cumberland Road, Short Street and Norfolk Road.

== Cultural life ==
Several major music festivals take place every summer at Catton Hall, on the outskirts of the village.

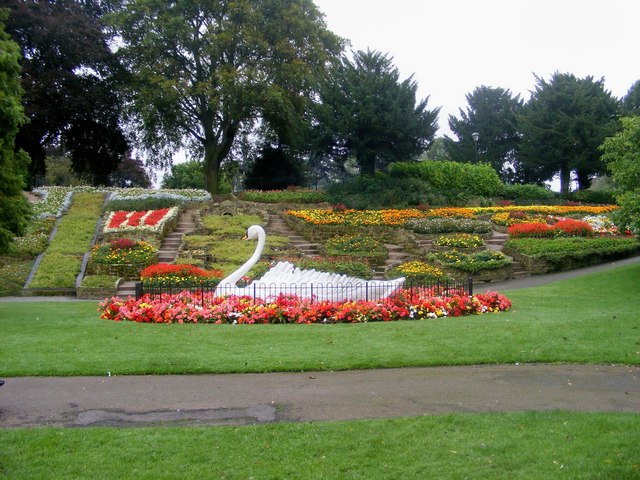
Summer bedding in Stapenhill Gardens

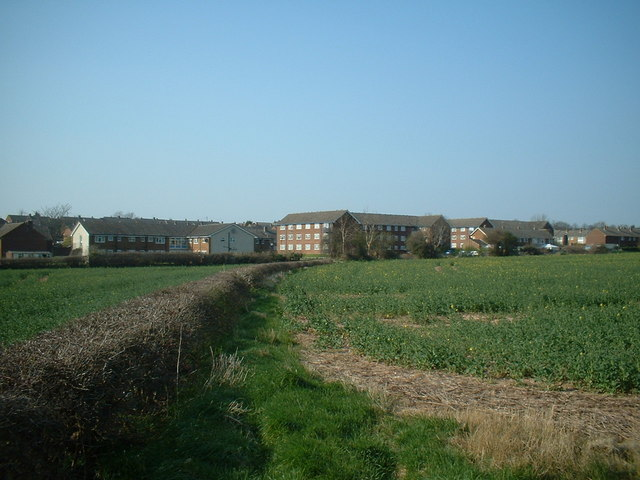
Stapenhill from the South

Stapenhill Gardens is the epitome of Stapenhill. Its main feature is a giant artificial swan with all flowers planted in it. This represents the swans who have historically inhabited the Gardens, and also the wider immutability of life in general. Similarly, the local football team is Stapenhill F.C. nicknamed "The Swans." Stapenhill Gardens is also the location of the annual "Tulip Festival", an event unrivalled outside The Netherlands, although this has not run for several years.

== Amenities ==
Current and former pubs and bars in the area include The Copper Hearth (now a One Stop supermarket), The New Inn, The Punch Bowl (now a care home), The Barley Mow (new home of the BIS), The Crown, The Grove, The Dart (now closed), The Freehold Tavern (now a Chinese restaurant), The Plough (now demolished for housing), and The Elms.

Stapenhill is well known for its wide variety of shopping opportunities, ranging from major chain-stores to independent craft butchers. The primary retail centres are Main Street; Rosliston Road/Brackenwood Road area; and Short Street/Lincoln Road.

Other local features include St Peter's Church of England church and a large cemetery. The municipal cemetery was opened in 1866 with chapels and a turreted gateway designed by Lucy and Littler of Liverpool.

== Education ==
The main Secondary Schools in the area are Paulet High School and Blessed Robert Sutton Catholic Voluntary Academy. Primary schools include Violet Lane Infants and Edge Hill Junior to the east, and to the south Waterside Junior and Short Street Infants merged in 2011 to become Riverview Primary.

== Notable people ==
- Sydney Evershed (c.1825–1903) a brewer and Liberal Party MP for Burton 1886–1900. He lived at Stapenhill from 1860
- William Henry Wesley (1841 in Stapenhill – 1922) an engraver, artist, astronomer and administrator, assistant secretary of the Royal Astronomical Society 1875–1922.
- Sir Sydney Evershed (1861 in Stapenhill – 1937) a brewer and cricketer who played first-class cricket for Derbyshire from 1880 to 1901
- Wallis Evershed (1863 in Stapenhill — 1911) an English cricketer who played for Derbyshire between 1882 and 1884.
- Frank Evershed (1866 in Stapenhill – 1954) an English rugby player who played internationally for England between 1889 and 1893 and a cricketer who played for Derbyshire.
- Edward Evershed (1867 in Stapenhill — 1957) an English cricketer who played for Derbyshire between 1888 and 1898.
- Geoffrey Bell MC (1896 in Stapenhill – 1984) an English cricketer and educationalist.

== See also ==
- Listed buildings in Stapenhill
