= Glandyfi Castle =

Mock castle in Ceredigion, Wales

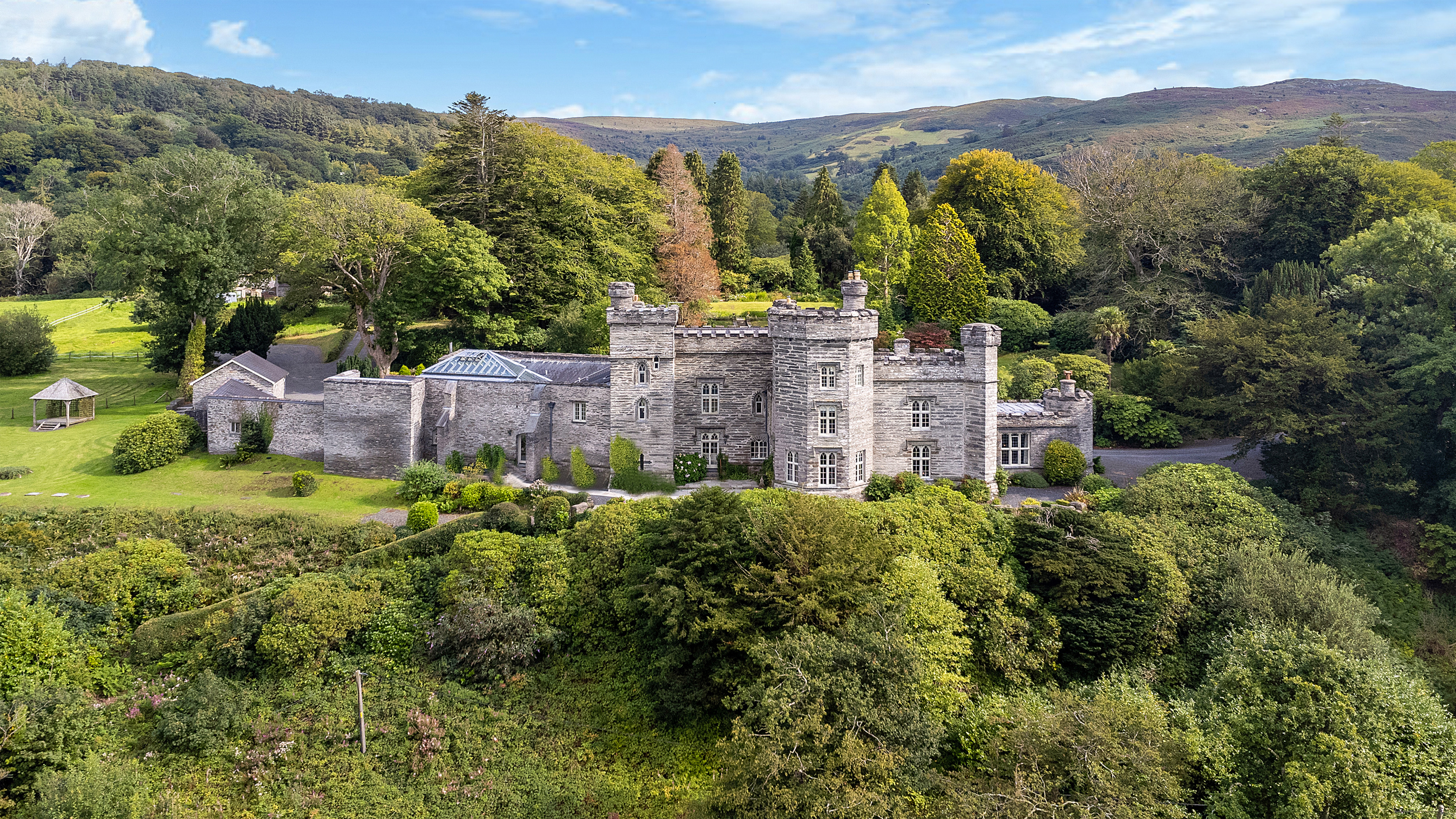
- Aerial shot of Glandyfi Castle

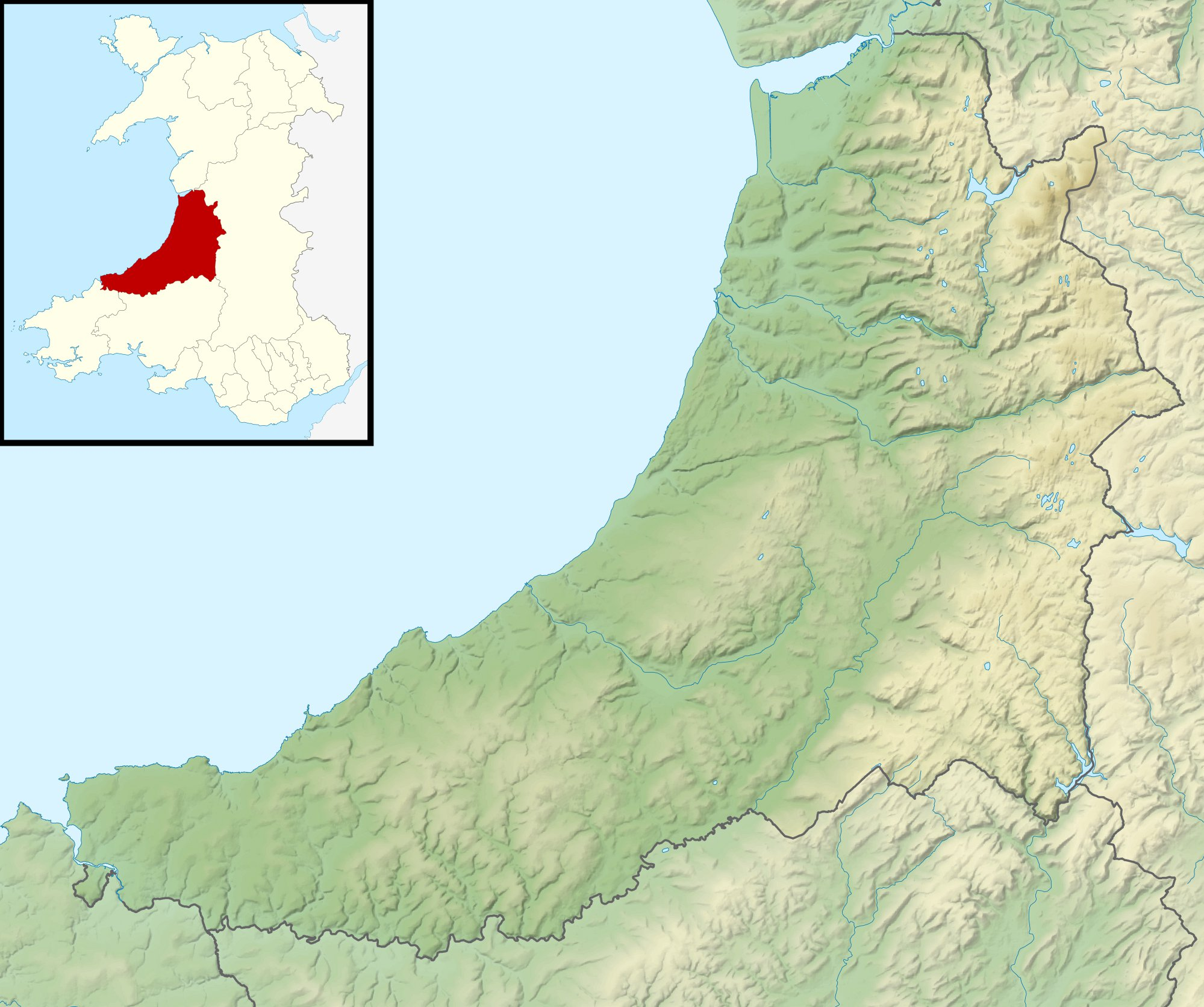
- Location within Ceredigion
- 52.5523°N 3.9302°W
- Type: House
- Location: Glandyfi, Ceredigion, Wales

History
- Built: 1812

Site notes
- Architectural style: Mock castle
- Governing body: Privately owned

Listed Building – Grade II
- Official name: Glandyfi Castle
- Designated: 21 January 1964
- Reference no.: 9874

Listed Building – Grade II
- Official name: Gatepiers to Glandyfi Castle
- Designated: 23 November 2004
- Reference no.: 83263

Glandyfi Castle in Glandyfi, Ceredigion, Wales, is a mock castle dating from the early 19th century. It was built for George Jeffreys, a barrister and High Sheriff of Cardiganshire, in around 1819. Jeffreys' great-uncle, Edward, had purchased the estate in 1792. The architect is not known, although John Hiram Haycock has been suggested. Jeffreys and his wife, Justina Jeffreys, were friends of Thomas Love Peacock, the novelist and poet, whose wedding took place at the castle in 1820. The only castellated country house in the county, Glandyfi is a Grade II listed building.

== History ==
The Jeffreys were originally from Shrewsbury and had moved to Ceredigion (then Cardiganshire) in the mid-18th century to develop lead smelting mills. Edward Jeffreys bought the Ynyshir estate, which included the site of the present castle, in 1792. He died in 1801, his son Robert died in 1802, and his other son, another Edward, was killed in the Peninsular War in 1812. The estate therefore passed to his brother, George, a lawyer, who began to build the castle immediately on his inheritance.

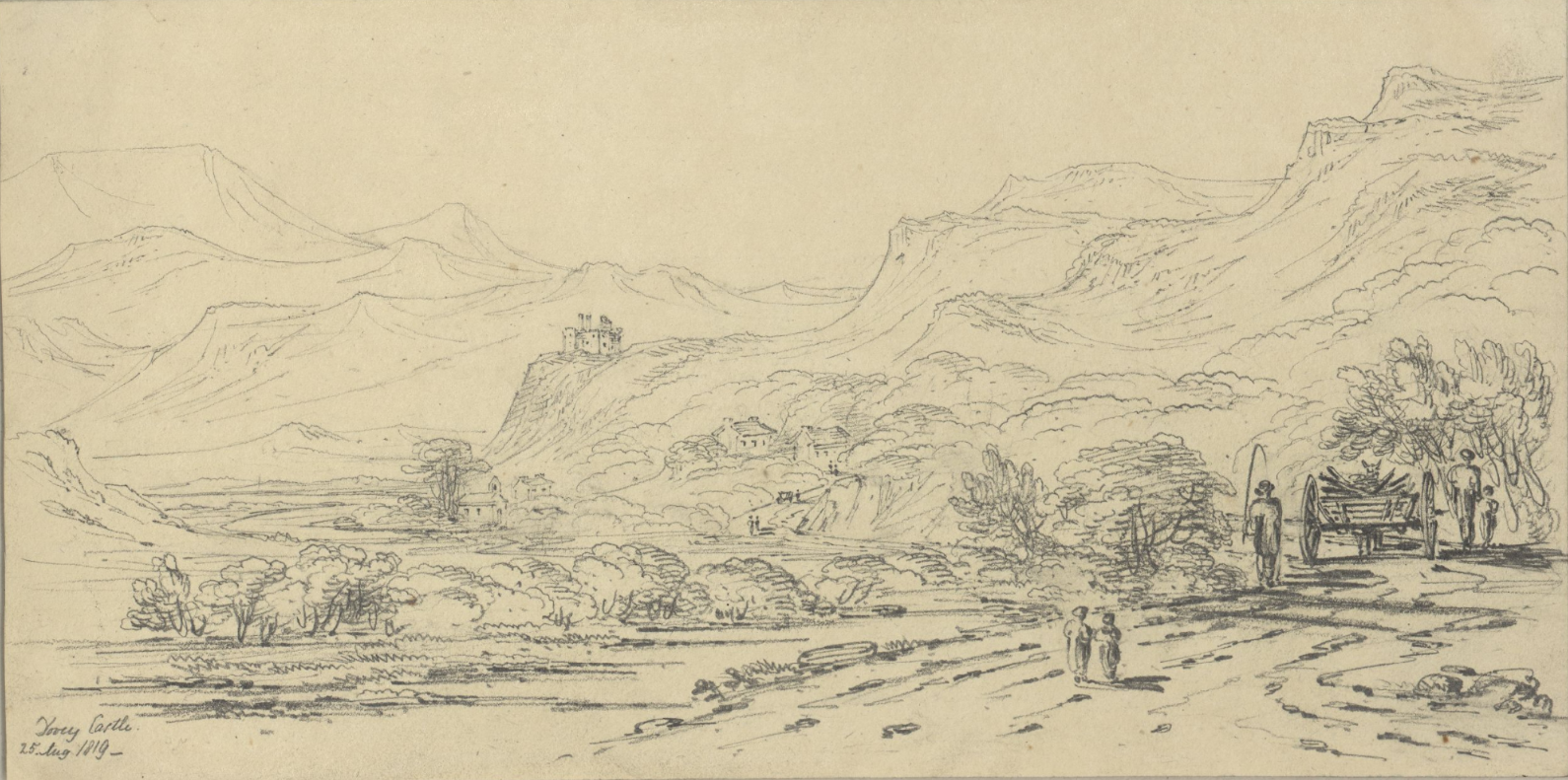
View of Glandyfi Castle from the west around the time of its completion.

In 1819, Jeffreys was made High Sheriff of Cardiganshire and the following year his close friend, Thomas Love Peacock, married Jane Griffith, an event celebrated by their reception at the castle. Jeffreys died in 1868 and the death of his second son, Charles, in 1906 saw the sale of Glandyfi.

=== 20th and 21st century ===
In 1906, the castle and its 370-acre (150 ha) estate were sold to Lewis Pugh Pugh of Abermad, who subsequently sold on the castle, with a reduced acreage, to Major Robert John Spurrell, of Bessingham, Norfolk.

In the 1950s, the property was purchased by the Birmingham Small Arms Company, for the use of its chairman, Sir Bernard Docker. Docker and his second wife, Norah Collins, were known for their extravagant lifestyles, generally funded from the assets of Docker's companies rather than their own. Their profligacy saw Docker's abrupt removal from the chairmanship of BSA, and the sale of Glandyfi, in 1956. (Note: A later owner of Glandyfi recorded the reaction of local people to the Dockers' extravagance: "The older people around here who remember them say they were unbelievable, almost mythical figures. At a time when everyone else was still on rationing, the Dockers were thundering through the lanes in limousines made out of gold and silver.") Since the Docker era, the castle has undergone restoration and refurbishment.

The castle was later used as an hotel, a wedding venue and a bed and breakfast establishment. That usage ended in September 2019 when the property was listed for sale, described as beautifully restored by Country Life magazine. The castle then included 10 bedrooms, 10 bathrooms and 31 acres (13 ha) of land. In April 2022, the castle was again listed for sale.

== Architecture and description ==
The Agrarian and Industrial revolutions of the mid-18th century saw the emergence of Gothic Revival architecture, which began to challenge the dominance of the Baroque. This saw a rapid increase in castle-building; notable examples within Wales were Penrhyn in the north and Cyfartha in the south. Glandyfi is on a much smaller scale, but stands in comparison with Stanage Park at Knighton, just over the border in Powys. Stanage was designed by John Hiram Haycock and the connections are such that Pevsner suggests Haycock as the architect for Glandyfi, although Cadw notes the lack of documentary evidence to support this.

The castle consists of a two-storey central block, with a three-storey tower to the left and a large buttress to the right. A dining room and a small tower are later additions. Battlements crenellate the whole building. The interior contains imported wood panelling. The castle is a Grade II listed building, its listing record noting that it is "the only example [of a] Georgian country house in picturesque castellated style in the county".

== Sources ==
- Lloyd, Thomas; Orbach, Julian; Scourfield, Robert (2006). Carmarthenshire and Ceredigion. The Buildings of Wales. New Haven, US and London: Yale University Press. ISBN 978-0-300-10179-9. OCLC 71164002.
- Macaulay, James (1975). The Gothic Revival 1745–1845. Glasgow and London: Blackie. ISBN 9780216898929.
