= Norah Docker =

English socialite (1906–1983)

Norah Royce Docker, Lady Docker (née Turner; 23 June 1906 – 11 December 1983) was an English socialite. A dance hostess at a club in her youth, she married three times, on each occasion to a millionaire businessman.

== Early life ==
She was born in Derby in 1906 as Norah Royce Turner to Sydney and Amy Turner. She was the second eldest of four children: Bernice, her older sister by two years, Alma was six years younger, and brother Royce, the youngest. The Turners moved to Birmingham, where her father bought into a car dealership. Her father committed suicide when she was 16, and she was the last to see her father alive.

As a young woman, she became a dance hostess at London’s Cafe de Paris. She was courted by three men simultaneously, known as "The Judge, the Duke and the Frenchman" in her autobiography. 'The Judge' was Cecil Whiteley and 'The Duke' was the Ninth Duke of Marlborough. She had an affair with Clement Callingham and moved into his house while his divorce from his wife, Pamela, was being settled. Clement was a millionaire, the chairman of Henekeys whisky. Docker married Callingham at the Chelsea Registry Office as soon as his divorce became absolute.

== Book ==
Her autobiography, Norah: The Autobiography of Lady Docker, was published by W.H.Allen in 1969. It was a best-seller.

It was ghostwritten and edited by Showbusiness columnist Don Short. It is the only authorised book about Norah Docker. The introduction reads: 'At least I have not attempted to conceal anything from you and my conscience is calm, for I have told all with honesty. All I ask is that you judge me with the same honesty. And, finally, a word of apology to those thousands of people whose names I would like to have mentioned in this book: but just think of those thousands more who will feel greatly relieved when they find they have been left out...'

Professor Carol Dyhouse said the autobiography 'opened with a repudiation of passive, domestic forms of femininity' and Professor Dyhouse describes Norah as 'a working-class heroine.'

Norah: The Autobiography of Lady Docker received very positive reviews on publication. Its riveting pace was highly praised, and its honesty was applauded. It was commended for being an engrossing and compelling life story. The reviews acknowledged the book as an important record of life in post-war Britain.

Bernard Conolly wrote in the Daily Mail: 'It’s an incredible, loveable, silly, etc., etc., autobiography […] This is an extraordinarily readable book.’ Ray Gosling in The Times said '‘Norah’ is a social document for sure, and it gave me, looking back on the experience, an interesting, smiley and thought-provoking read.’

The Bookseller said of the book: 'Fascinating and frank […] Here is a long hard look behind the silken curtains of the ‘International Set’ The Daily Mirror said: ‘Norah’s book is a mirror of herself. Nothing is hidden […] Norah was the original post-war rave-up merchant. She has her place in the social history of these times.’ The Guardian Journal said: ‘Frankness on this scale is completely disarming, and even the most disapproving critic will find it difficult to resist the famous charm’ The Chronicle described it as: 'Fascinating, frank and outspoken’ The Huddersfield Daily Examiner said: 'It is just as well that we have that we have all this gossipy life in print […] It is perhaps one of the better social histories of the post-war era.’ The New Statesman called it a 'hilarious phantasmagoria.' The Sunday Express serialised the title.

The Spectator named Norah: The Autobiography of Lady Docker as one of 'the best out-of-print books' in 2022. 'If there was ever a book ready for film, this is it: Norah’s dialogue with her family and friends, her thoughts, memories [...] are presented with a thorough description of the contents of each of her mansions and yacht, as well as in-depth depictions of articles in her wardrobe (undoubtedly useful for any filmmaker).' It remains one of the most in-demand out-of-print books.

Several videos about Lady Norah Docker feature the autobiography. They went viral on YouTube in 2024 and 2025, and in 2026 two videos went viral within days.

== Marriages ==
She was married three times. The first, to chairman of Henekeys whisky company Clement Callingham from 1938 until his death in 1945, resulted in one son, Lance.

The second, in 1946, to Sir William Collins, the president of Cerebos Salt, and Fortnum & Mason, lasted until his death in 1948.

The third, in 1949, was to Sir Bernard Docker, chairman of Birmingham Small Arms Company (owner of Daimler), and a director of the Midland Bank, Anglo-Argentine Tramways Company and Thomas Cook and Son.

== Public life ==
Lady Docker enjoyed life in the public eye. 'My close friends in Fleet Street have told me that I have been good entertainment value for money, for their millions of readers over the years, and frankly I have never objected!'

Professor Carol Dyhouse said that Norah, Lady Docker 'was well-aware that she herself had come to constitute a form of public entertainment'

Norah, Lady Docker was declared Britain's 'Most Photographed' woman and she was 'fawned over' by Fleet Street. She was known by the gossip columns as 'Naughty Norah'.

In 2011, The Dockers were called 'The Posh and Becks of the 1950s'.

'If the cult of celebrity is a modern phenomenon then Norah, Lady Docker was one of its pioneers' a newspaper said of the socialite in 2017.

On her appearances in the newspapers: 'People were cheered up, rather than made indignant, by Lady Docker's antics. She always hit the headlines; but the headlines rarely knocked her.'

Norah, Lady Docker was well-known for her enjoyment of mixing with different people. 'Though she mixed with royalty and aristocracy, part of Lady Docker's appeal was that she came from a humble background'.

In the summer of 1954, after a visit to Water Haigh colliery at Woodlesford near Leeds, Lady Docker invited several of the miners to a champagne party on the Dockers' yacht, Shemara, at which she danced the hornpipe. The image was used for the front cover of the Autobiography in 1969. Pathé News captured the event.

Lady Docker won a marbles championship in 1955 at Castleford's "Reight Neet Aht", a charity event for the Cancer Relief Fund, while wearing a sequin dress and diamonds. The match was rigged, the other players having been instructed to let her win. The next year, while in Melbourne, Australia, to watch the 1956 Summer Olympics, she challenged the suburb of Collingwood to a marbles match.

In 1969, her memoirs, Norah: The Autobiography of Lady Docker, ghostwritten and edited by Don Short, were published by W.H. Allen. One part reads: 'I have planted my feet, delicately but boldly, on red carpets in the palaces and castles of some of the most sacred dynasties across the world. Sometimes I was also bowled straight back down those same carpets.'

== Jewel thefts ==
When the Dockers moved to Mayfair, there was a series of jewel thefts. Norah discovered they had been robbed and £150,000 of jewellery went missing.

It was the biggest post-war robbery. The stolen jewellery included one of Norah's triple-row pearl necklaces, worth £11,500; an emerald and diamond bracelet, worth £8,500; a diamond necklace, worth £8,000; a double-clip diamond brooch, worth £7,000; an emerald ring, worth £5,000; a diamond bracelet, worth £5,000; and a diamond and sapphire bracelet, worth £2,400.

The Metro Newspaper said the jewel theft inspired the Pink Panther film.

When Norah Docker's jewellery was stolen again, she sought help from a gangster to try and retrieve the jewels.

== Docker Daimlers ==
In ‘Norah: The Autobiography of Lady Docker’, ‘The Golden Daimler’ is given its own chapter.

‘If I could find a single reason for my elevation to the dubious ranks of a celebrity, then I think, I would have a motor car to thank.’ She told her husband Sir Bernard Docker of her frustration that no one abroad had heard of Daimler cars. Bernard invited her to join the company and to take on the project.

The Docker Daimlers were the Dockers' 'most visible indulgences' and they were displayed at the Motor Shows of 1951-55.

In 2017 CarTalk Magazine called Norah, Lady Docker 'The car world's own Marie Antoinette.'

The 'Docker Daimlers' are notable collectables, and remain widely discussed automobiles in automotive history.

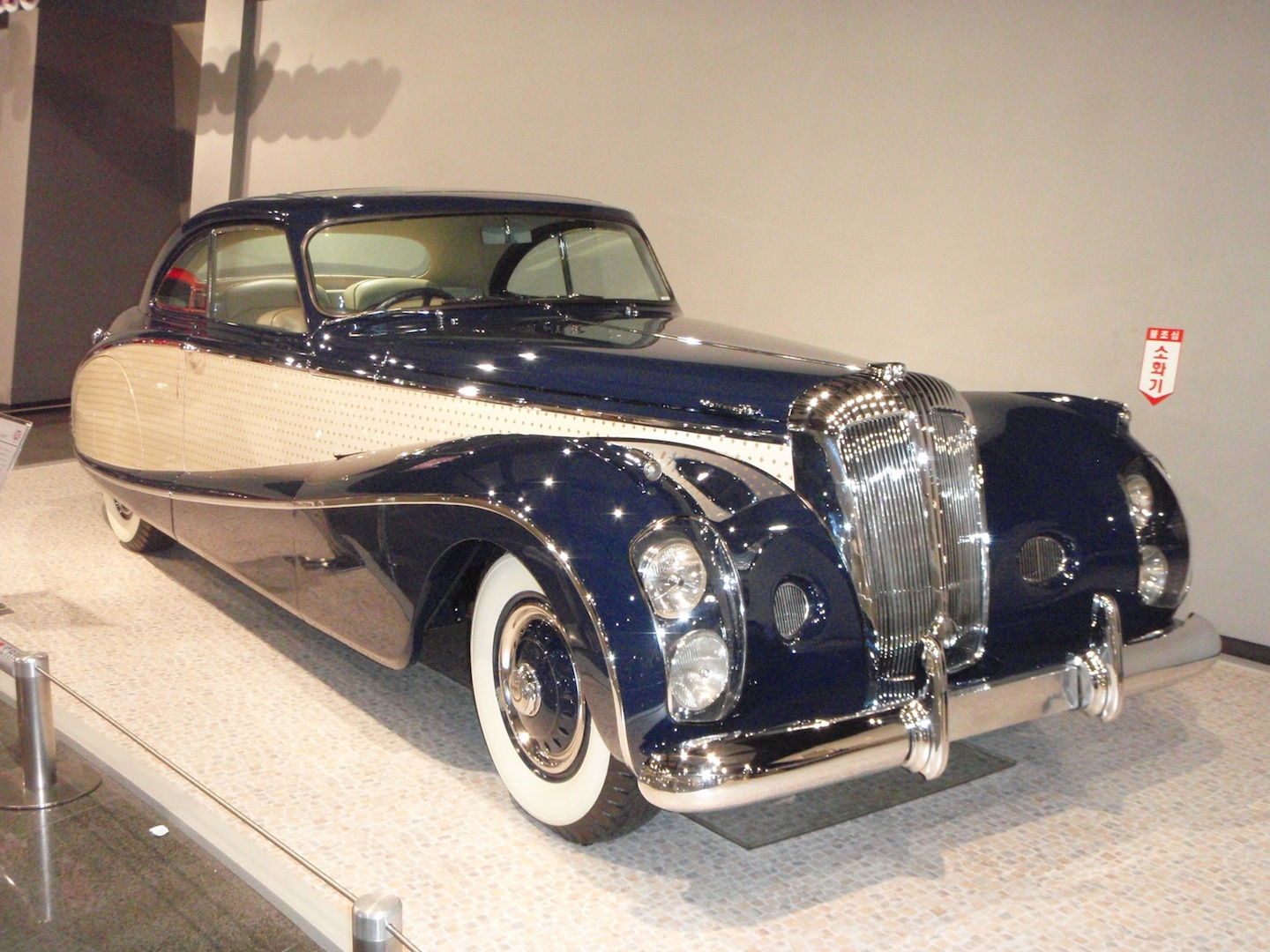
Blue Clover, her second show car

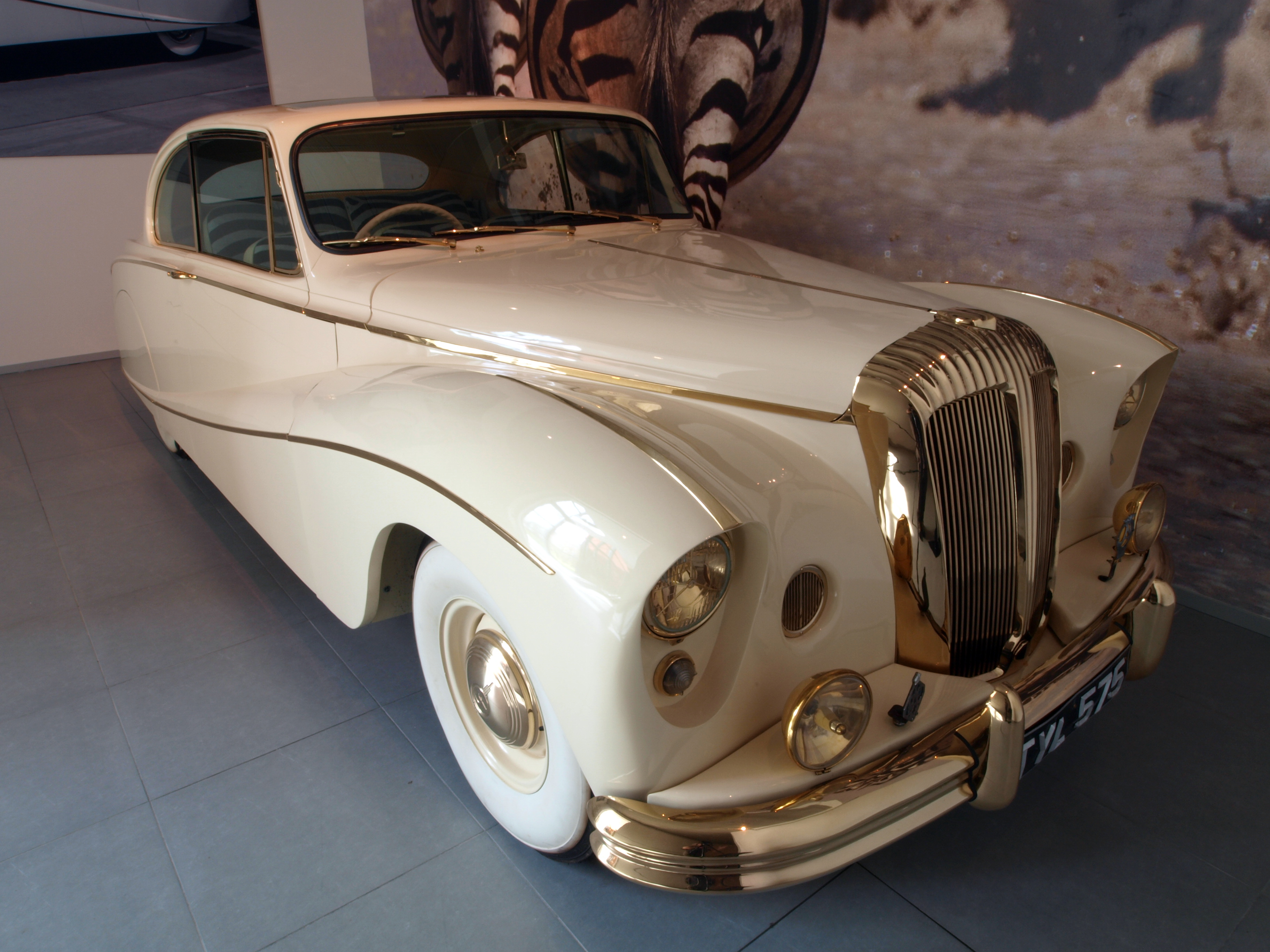
Golden Zebra for the Paris Show 1955

1951 – The Gold Car (a.k.a. Golden Daimler)

The Gold Car was a touring limousine on the Thirty-Six Straight-Eight chassis. The car was covered with 7,000 tiny gold stars, and all plating that would normally have been chrome was gold. This car was taken to Paris, the United States and Australia.

The car was sold in 1959 for seven thousand, three hundred pounds, to an American motor-cycle distributor, William E. Johnson, Junior, of Pasadena. In her Autobiography, Norah says: ‘Unfortunately, the golden Daimler reached him stripped of its gold leaf - there was a Government order in force forbidding the export of gold. I can’t imagine they would have had much trouble in removing the gold. I found that I could scape it off with my fingernail, it was that thin.’

The Golden Daimler had a golden zebra at the front of the car as its mascot.

1952 – Blue Clover

Also on the Thirty-Six Straight-Eight chassis, Blue Clover was a two-door sportsman's coupé

1953 – Silver Flash

The Silver Flash was an aluminium-bodied coupé based on the 3-litre Regency chassis. Its accessories included solid silver hairbrushes and red fitted luggage made from crocodile skin.

The initial plans were for a two seater sports car, in a deep green with the interior trim scarlet crocodile. But Norah Docker was told it looked terrible. At the last minute, she instructed it to be resprayed in a metallic blue-grey. When asked for the name by a journalist, she went blank, before announcing it was called ‘Silver Flash.’

1954 – Star Dust

based on the DF400 chassis Norah delivered it to the Hooper stand at Earls Court with silver stars embossed over the dark blue bodywork. It had chrome fittings with crocodile interior and silver brocade seating.

Bonhams sold the Lady Docker 1954 Daimler DK400 'Stardust' Limousine for £110,140 It was one of a series of opulent cars.

1955 – Golden Zebra

The Golden Zebra was a two-door coupé based on the DK400 chassis.

It was a cream and gold, fixed head sports car, with an ivory dashboard, cocktail cabinet, vanity box and built-in picnic basket. There was an ivory collapsible umbrella among the accessories. Norah, Lady Docker’s initials were inscribed in gold letters on the door, and they had a gold replica of a zebra on the bonnet. The upholstery inside the car was real zebra-skin. ‘“Zebra?” questioned astonished reporters. “Yes,” I retorted. “It’s the best skin, because mink is too hot to sit on.” My answer was quoted all over the world, and it became the most famous of all my aphorisms.’

Alongside the show cars kept for her personal use, Lady Docker also owned other Daimler cars, including an unmodified Conquest drophead coupé.

== The Shemara ==
The Shemara yacht is also given its own chapter in the Autobiography. The Dockers used the Shemara to hold parties and hosted guests including King Farouk of Egypt, and politicians and writers.

Many years later, Norah offered to sell the Shemara to Mr Onassis but he couldn’t think where to moor her. It was sold to a city property developer who offered £290,000. He claimed to have found defects aboard the Shemara which would cost £100,000 to put right. The Dockers contested it and the case went to High Court who ruled in the Dockers’ favour, saying they could only find one minor fault costing £100 to repair.

== Separation from BSA ==
At the end of May 1956, Sir Bernard Docker was removed from the board of Birmingham Small Arms Company (BSA), where he had been chairman.

The issues leading to the removal of the Dockers stemmed from the extravagant expenses they presented to the company, including the show cars made available for Lady Docker's personal use, a £5,000 gold and mink ensemble that Lady Docker wore at the 1956 Paris Motor Show that she tried to write off as a business expense as she "was only acting as a model" at the show, and Glandyfi Castle, bought with £12,500 of BSA's money and refurbished for £25,000, again with company money.

Lady Norah Docker shared the story in the chapter titled, ‘The B.S.A. Affair’ in the Autobiography: 'There has been criticism of what I have done, but I would like the shareholders to know that I have received no financial benefit, in anyway whatsoever, for what I have done. I believe I did a very good job.’

== Prince Rainier and Monte Carlo feud ==
In 1956, the Dockers were invited to the royal wedding of Prince Rainier and Princess Grace. Norah reported critically on the wedding in the New York Herald Tribune and the London Sunday Graphic.

One year later, The Dockers were invited to attend the christening of Prince Albert but the invitation was not extended to Norah's own son. Norah was furious and over lunch in the Hotel de Paris, she told Bernard she wanted to leave. In the centre of their table, there was a crepe paper Monegasque flag and she tore it up.

The following day, Norah learned she was banned from Monaco. Time Magazine stated that, by a 1951 friendship treaty with France, Monaco invoked its right to ban the Dockers from the entire Riviera.

== Decline ==
Without their main source of income, the Dockers began to run out of money. In 1966, they sold their estate in Hampshire and moved to Jersey in the Channel Islands, becoming tax exiles. In the Autobiography, Norah explained her isolation. 'Now we feel alone in this world, long since forgotten by those we helped, with only a handful of true and trusted friends remaining.'

== Death ==
Lady Docker died on 11 December 1983, aged 77, in the Great Western Royal Hotel in London where she was known to staff as a 'very kind old lady.'

She is buried in the churchyard of St. James-the-Less in Stubbings, near Maidenhead.

== Sources ==
- Docker, Norah; Short, Don (1969). Norah: the Autobiography of Lady Docker. ISBN. London: W.H. Allen. ISBN 0491006993.
