= John Hiram Haycock =

English architect (1759-1830)

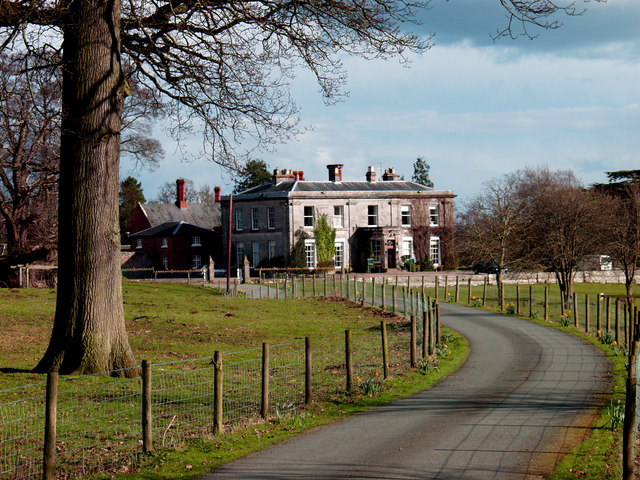
- Sweeney Hall, Morda, Oswestry
- Born: 1759; Shrewsbury, England
- Died: 6 January 1830 (aged 70–71); Shrewsbury, England
- Occupation: Architect
- Relatives: Edward Haycock Sr. (son)
- Practice: J H Haycock and Edward Haycock 1814-1830
- Buildings: Shrewsbury Prison, Allatt’s Charity School, Gunley Hall

John Hiram Haycock (1759-1830) was an architect who built many notable buildings in Shropshire and Montgomeryshire. He was the son of William Haycock (1725-1802), a carpenter and joiner of Shrewsbury. He was apprenticed to his father and became a freeman of the Shrewsbury Carpenters’ and Bricklayers’ Company in 1796. From about 1814 he worked in partnership with his son Edward Haycock, Sr., and became the Shropshire county surveyor in 1824.

== Architectural works ==
=== Public buildings ===
- Cross Houses. The Atcham Union Workhouse.
- Shrewsbury, The Guildhall and Shirehall. 1783-85. Demolished 1835, as the foundations were unstable.
- Shrewsbury Millington’s Hospital, Frankwell. Almshouse. Built in 1748, but altered by Haycock in 1782.
- Shrewsbury The County Gaol 1787-93. Designed by Haycock, but built by Thomas Telford.
- Preston upon the Weald Moors, Preston Hospital. A former Almshouse. Added wings and outer pavilion buildings in 1827. J H and E Haycock.

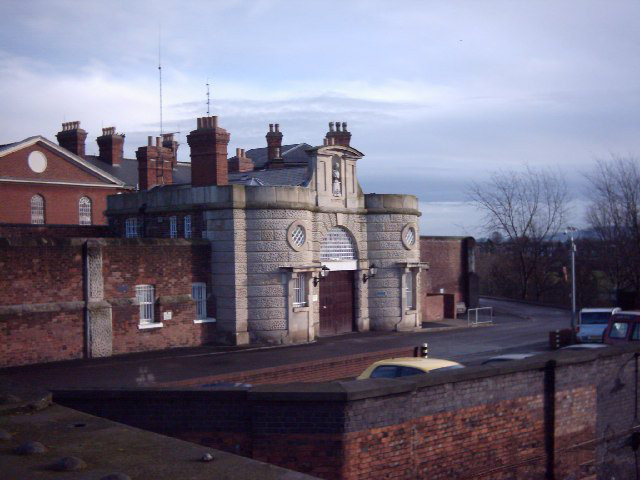
Shrewsbury Prison main entrance showing gateway and Governor’s House designed by Haycock

=== Schools ===
- Shrewsbury Allatt’s Charity School, Murivance. Classical facade by Haycock, 1799-1800.
- Shrewsbury. Former Shrewsbury School building now Shrewsbury Library. Altered by John and Edward Haycock in 1815.
- Shrewsbury. Former Shrewsbury School Headmaster’s House, School Lane.

=== Church ===
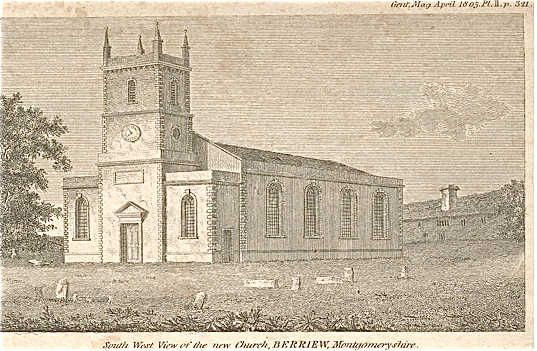
Berriew Church, Montgomeryshire

- Berriew Church, Montgomeryshire. Reconstructed Church in 1803-4.

=== Country houses ===
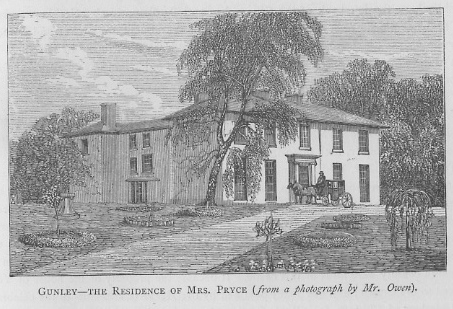
Gunley Hall, Montgomeryshire From Nicholls “Annals and Antiquities of Wales”,1872. Vol 2, 799

- Oakly Park, Bromfield, Shropshire. Remodelled by Haycock (1784–90) and later by C R Cockerell.
- Oakley House
- Moreton Corbet Castle. Unexecuted designs 1796.
- Shawbury, Acton Reynald Hall. Enlarged 1800
- Oswestry Sweeney Hall 1805. Built for T N Parker. Bland, ashlar faced block, with massive pilasters.
- Forden, Montgomeryshire. Gunley Hall 1810. Porch with Ionic columns.
- Lydham, The Roveries. Stuccoed villa of 1810 for John Oakley.
- Claverley, Chyknell. Villa style house 1814.
- Ruyton-XI-Towns, Pradoe. Enlarged 1817.
- Stanage Park, Radnorshire. Haycock appears to have acted as a building contractor for John Adey Repton
- Glandyfi Castle, built 1820. Attributed to Haycock on the basis of its similarities to Stanage Park.

== Gallery of work by J. H. Haycock ==
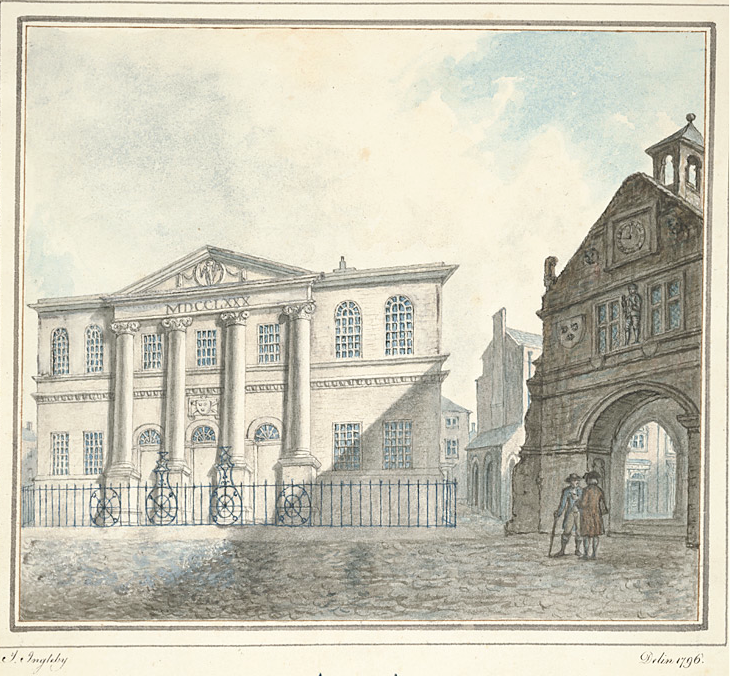
Shrewsbury Guildhall and Market Hall 1796

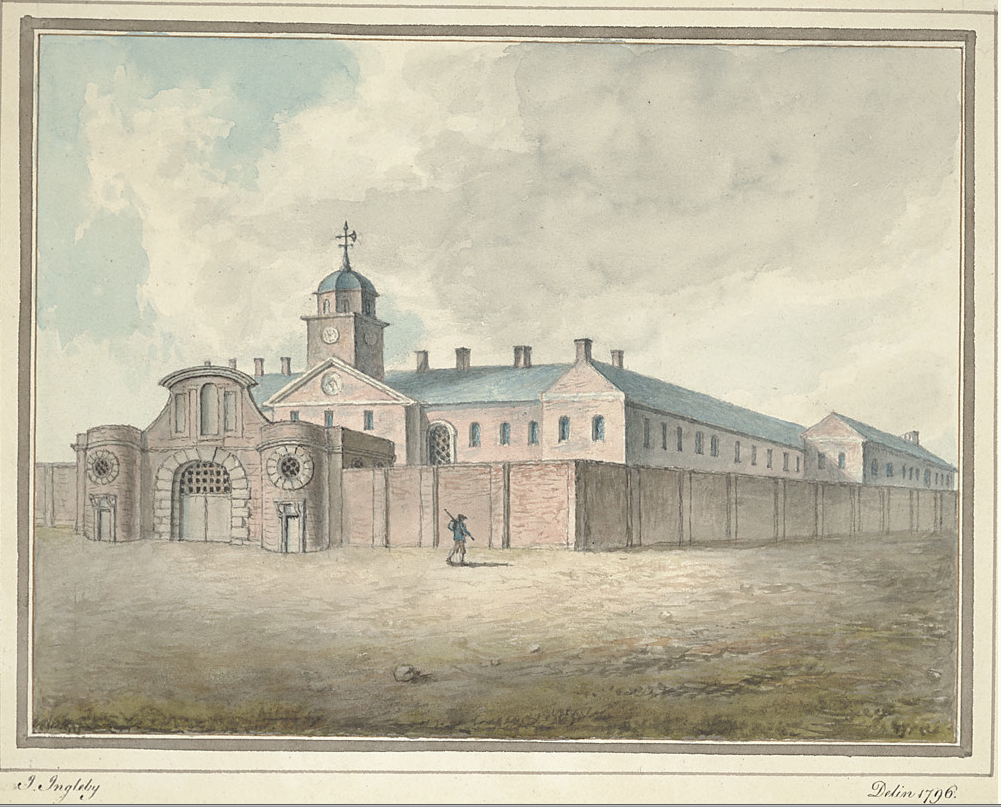
John Ingleby. View of Shrewsbury Prison in 1796 NLW PD9246

== Literature ==
- Colvin H. (2008), A Biographical Dictionary of British Architects 1600-1840 Yale University Press, 4th edition London.
- J Newman and N Pevsner, (2006), The Buildings of England: Shropshire, Yale.
- Lloyd, Thomas; Orbach, Julian; Scourfield, Robert (2006). Carmarthenshire and Ceredigion. The Buildings of Wales. New Haven, US and London: Yale University Press. ISBN 978-0-300-10179-9. OCLC 71164002.
- R Scourfield and R Haslam, (2013), The Buildings of Wales: Powys; Montgomeryshire, Radnorshire and Breconshire, Yale University Press.
