= Justina Jeffreys =

Jamaican-born British gentlewoman (1787–1869)

- Born: 10 September 1787; Jamaica
- Died: 1869 (aged 81–82)
- Other name: Justina Scott
- Spouse: George Jeffreys (m. 1814; died 1868)
- Children: 9

Justina Jeffreys (10 September 1787 – 1869) was a Jamaican-born British gentlewoman in Wales. She resided the majority of her life at Glandyfi Castle which was built by her husband.

== Early life ==
Justina Jeffreys was born on 10 September 1787 in Jamaica and was baptised there at St. Andrew's Parish. She was mixed-race: her father was Scotsman Charles McMurdo (1744–1826), a captain of the British Army's 3rd Regiment of Foot and brigade major in Jamaica, while her mother Susan Leslie (1766–1812) was a free black woman. At the time, it was relatively common for military personnel stationed in Jamaica to take mistresses. When her father eventually left Jamaica, he moved to Canada where he married, before returning to Scotland, while her mother began a relationship with Scottish doctor John Wright, and had two sons with him.

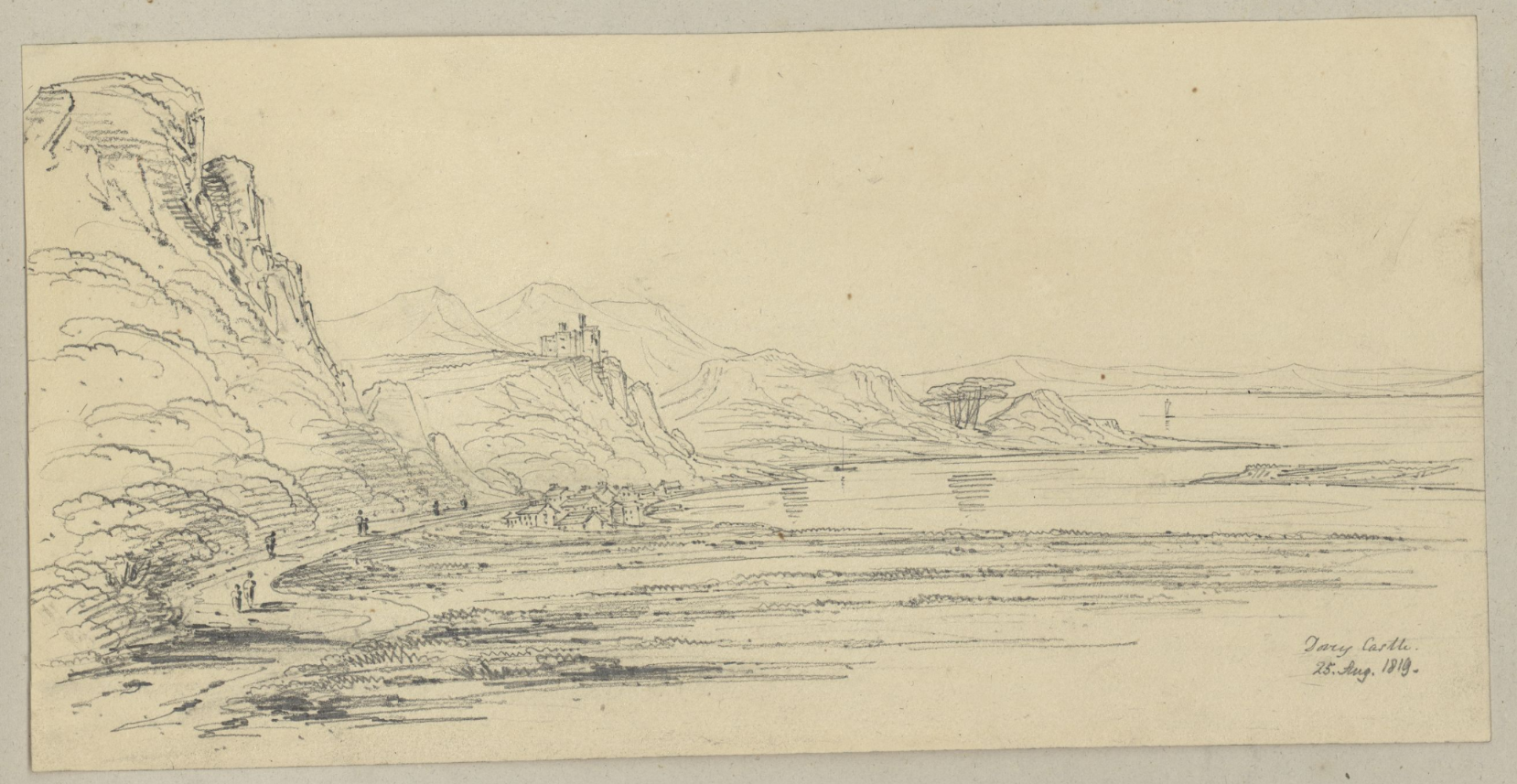
View of Glandyfi Castle around the time of its completion.

She spent her early childhood in Jamaica along with her younger brother Charles McMurdo Leslie (1790–1865), until she was sent to Wales at the age of 6 to be cared for by Edward Scott (1752–1842) and his wife Louisa de Saumaise (1755–1803). Scott had known her father while he was stationed in Jamaica. After she arrived in Wales, she began to be known as Justina Scott.

== Marriage ==
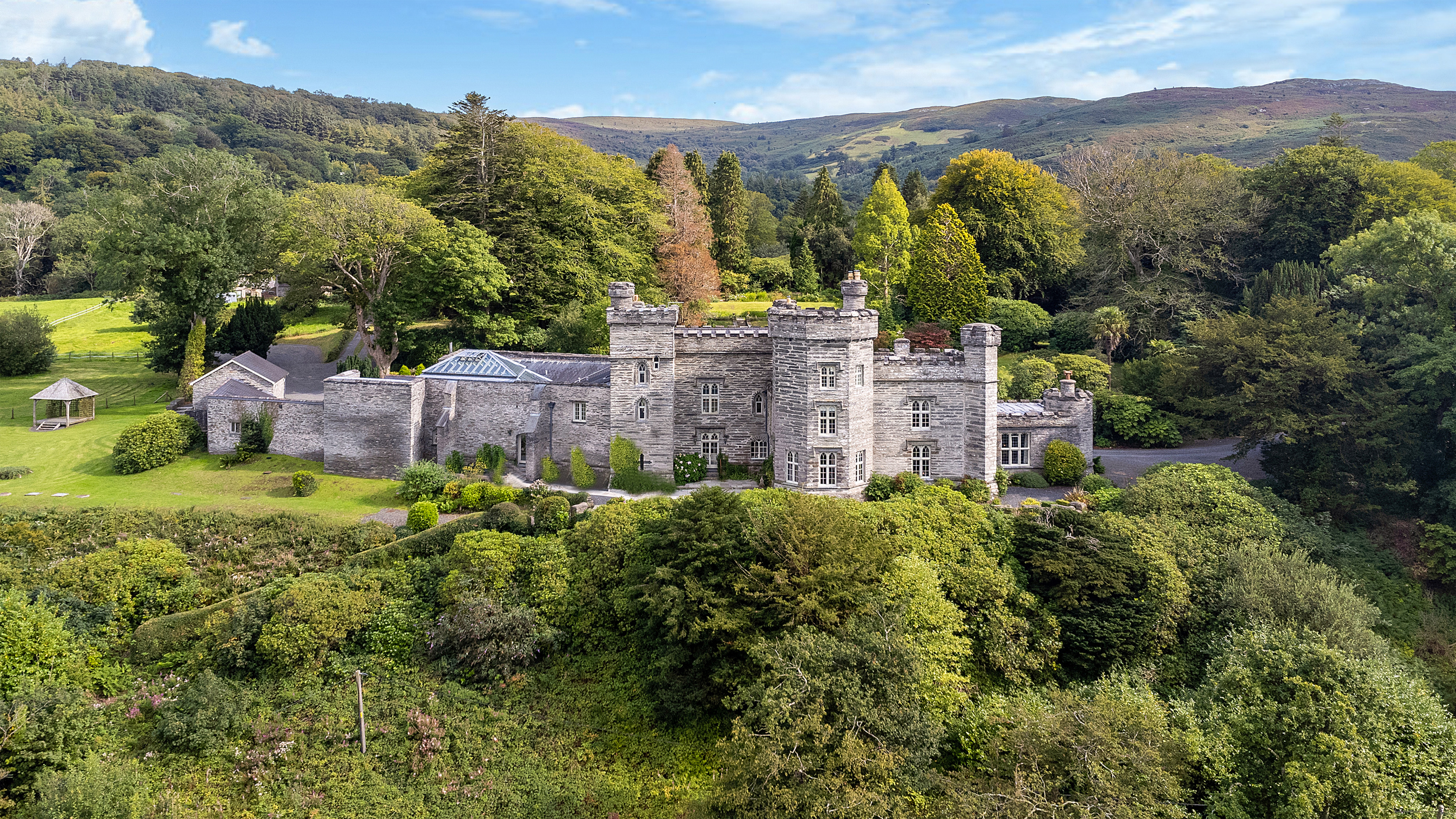
Glandyfi Castle, the Neo-Gothic residence of Justina and George Jeffreys

In 1814, she married George Jeffreys in Tywyn. The couple had nine children, with one dying in infancy. About 1812, George began work on Glandyfi Castle, a Regency gothic mock castle overlooking the River Dyfi.

Jeffreys is said to have been the inspiration for the character Anthelia in her friend Thomas Love Peacock's 1817 novel Melincourt. She would later host Peacock's wedding to Jane Gryffydh at Glandyfi Castle in 1820.

== Death ==
Jeffreys and her husband lived the rest of their lives at Glandyfi Castle on its completion. George Jeffreys died in 1868, while Justina died one year later in 1869. They were both buried at St Michael's, Eglwys Fach.
