= Bernard Docker =

English industrialist

Sir Bernard Dudley Frank Docker (9 August 1896 – 22 May 1978) was an English industrialist.

== Early life ==
Docker was born in Edgbaston, Birmingham on 9 August 1896. He was the only child of Frank Dudley Docker, an English businessman and financier, and Lucy Constance (daughter of distinguished lawyer John Benbow Hebbert). His parents initially lived at Rotton Park Lodge, close to the Docker Brothers varnish factory, before moving to The Gables, at Kenilworth, and, in 1935 moved to Coleshill House, Amersham, Buckinghamshire.

== Career ==
Docker was the managing director of the Birmingham Small Arms Company (BSA) group of companies from the early 1940s until 1956.

He was the Chair of the British Hospitals Association in 1941 and represented them on the Nurses Salaries Committee chaired by Lord Rushcliffe which published two reports in 1943.

At the end of May 1956, Docker was removed from the board of BSA, and he was replaced as chairman by Jack Sangster. An entire chapter of Norah: the Autobiography of Lady Docker is devoted to the Dockers and their separation from Midland Bank titled 'The B.S.A. Affair'. The book was ghostwritten and edited by Don Short.

He also chaired The Daimler Company Limited and the Anglo-Argentine Tramways Company. He was awarded a knighthood in 1938 for his "energetic work during twelve years as the Chairman of Westminster Hospital."

== Personal life ==
In 1933 Docker married British actress Jeanne Stuart (born Ivy Sweet), but the marriage was soon dissolved after pressure from Docker's parents. His father had her tracked by private detectives, and after finding her with an actor, David Hutcheson, Docker divorced her in 1935. She later married Baron Eugène von Rothschild in 1952.

His second wife was Norah Collins (née Norah Royce Turner), a former showgirl whom he married at Caxton Hall in 1949. She was the widow of Sir William Collins, the president of Fortnum & Mason, and also the widow of Clement Callingham, the head of Henekeys wine and spirits merchants. They lived at Heath House in Stockbridge.

Without their main source of income, the Dockers began to run out of money. In 1965, Docker put Shemara, his yacht, on the market for £600,000; it was eventually sold for £290,000 to British businessman Harry Hyams. In Norah: the Autobiography of Lady Docker, their isolation was described. "Now we feel alone in this world, long since forgotten by those we helped, with only a handful of true and trusted friends remaining."

== Yachts and automobiles ==
=== MY Shemara ===
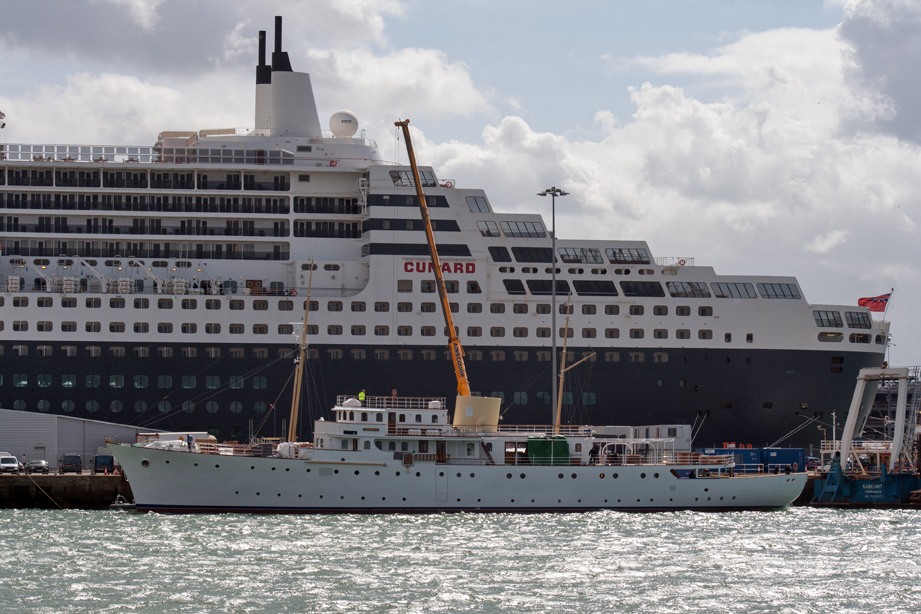
MY Shemara seen at Southampton Docks.

Docker commissioned John I. Thornycroft & Company to build a 863 tonne yacht to his specifications in 1938, names Shemara. 'I must stress that she was our home,' Norah: the Autobiography of Lady Docker states. MY Shemara was requisitioned by the Royal Navy at the start of the Second World War in 1939 and used as a training vessel for anti-submarine warfare. It was during a training exercise with HMS Shemara that the submarine HMS Untamed was lost with all her crew. Shemara left RN service in 1946

=== Green Goddess ===
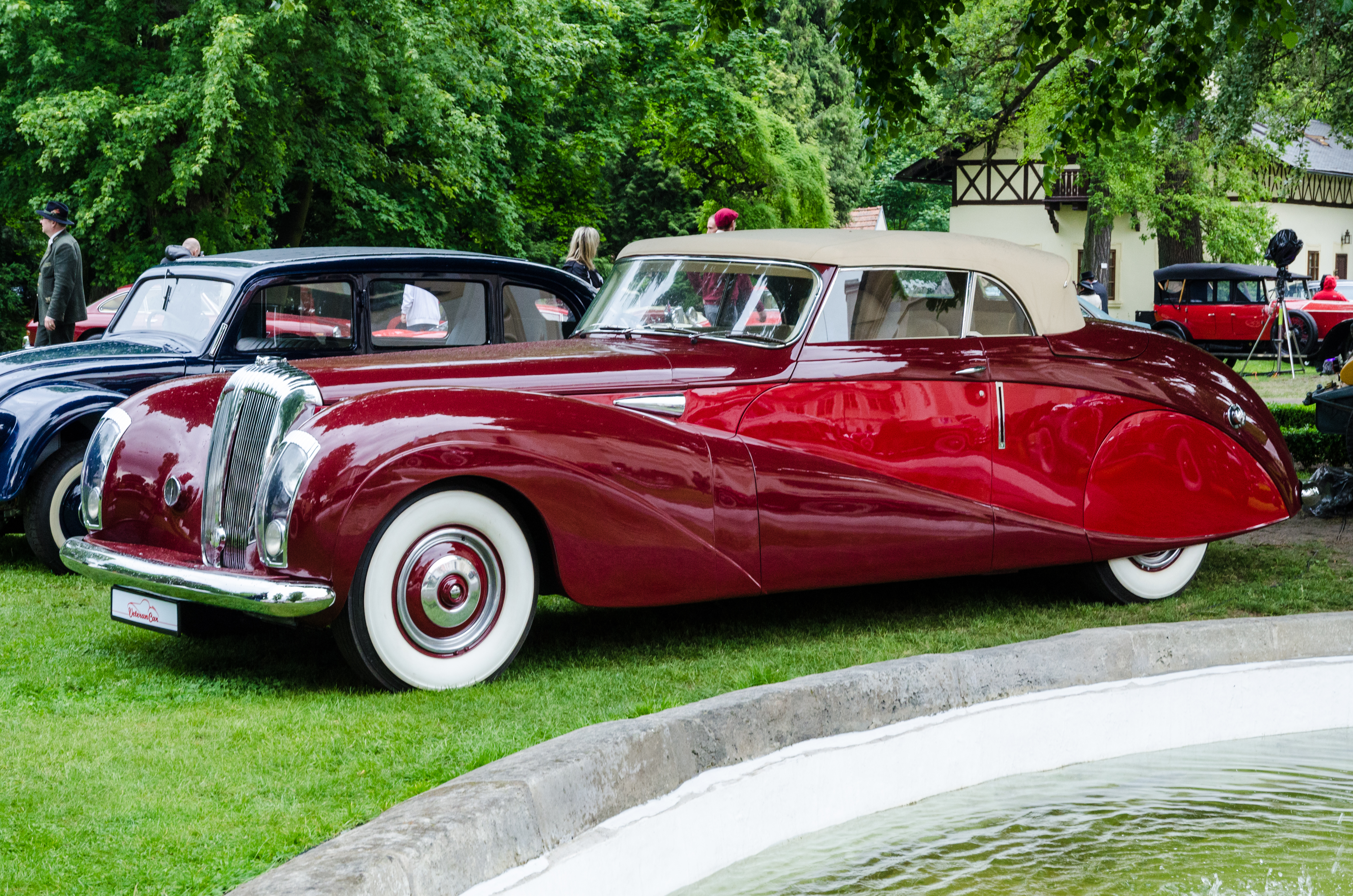
1949 Daimler DE 36 "Green Goddess" drophead

Docker commissioned Hooper & Co. to build a drophead coupé on a Daimler DE-36 chassis for display at the first post-war British International Motor Show at the Earls Court Exhibition Centre in 1948. Named the "Green Goddess" by the press, the car had five seats, three windscreen wipers, and hydraulic operation of both the hood and the hood cover. After the show, the car was further tested and refined, after which it was kept by Docker for his personal use. Six other chassis were bodied with similar bodies. These were all called "Green Goddesses" after the original, which was exhibited with jade-green coachwork and green-piped beige leather.

=== Docker Daimlers ===
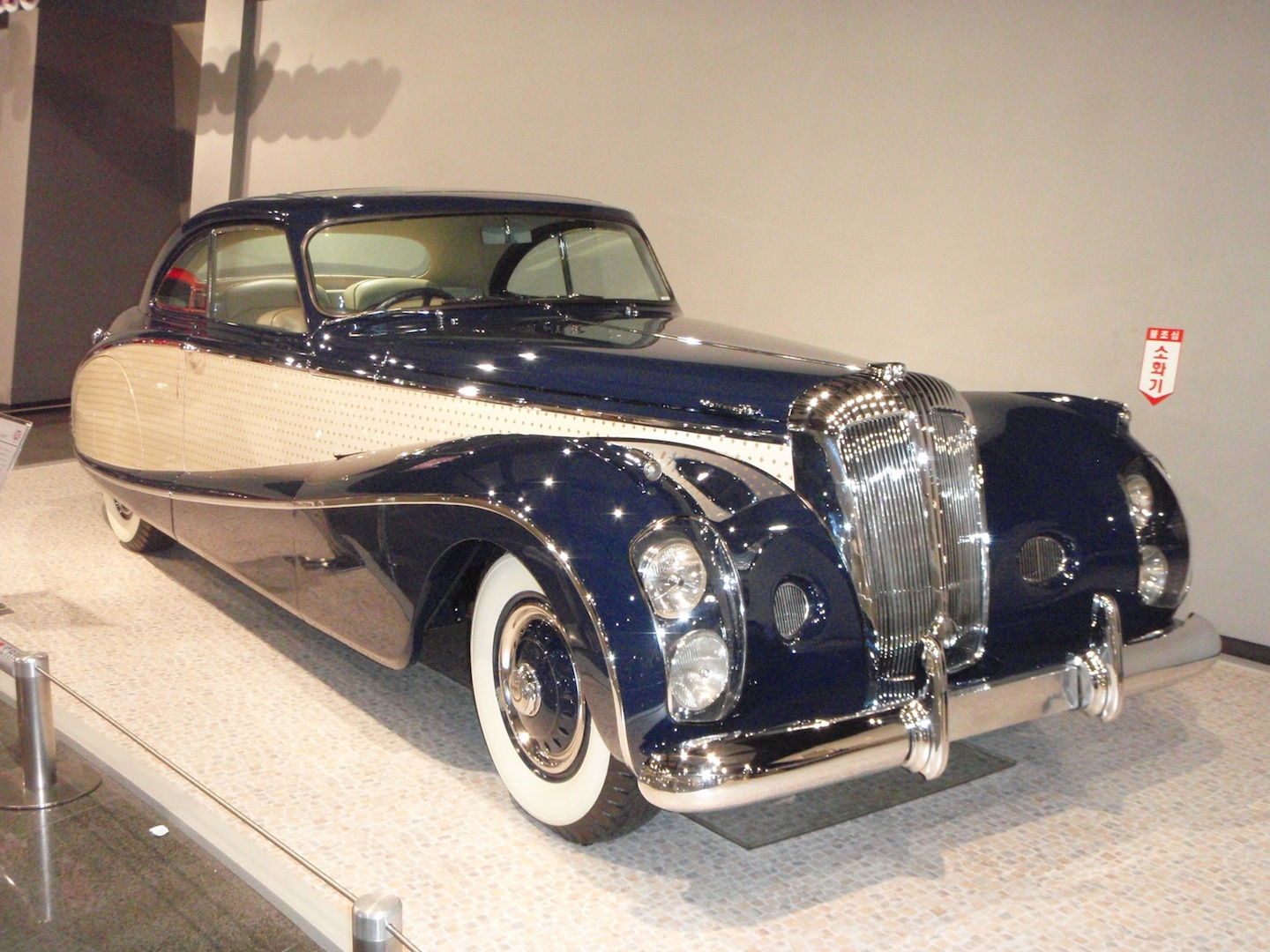
Blue Clover, the 1952 show car

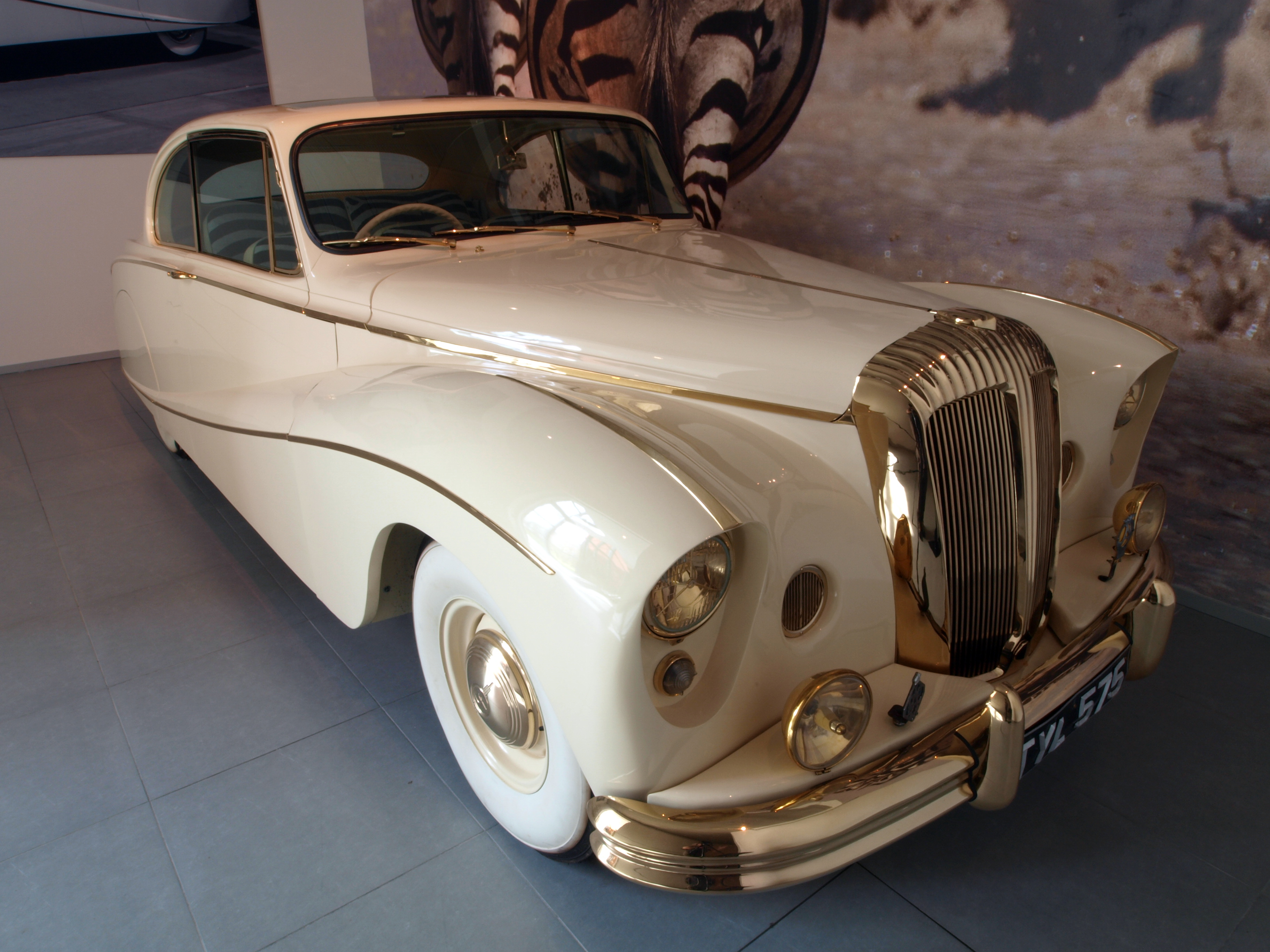
Golden Zebra, for the 1955 Paris Show

Sir Bernard Docker commissioned a series of Daimlers that were built to Lady Docker's specifications for the show circuit.

In ‘Norah: The Autobiography of Lady Docker’, ‘The Golden Daimler’ is given its own chapter. ‘If I could find a single reason for my elevation to the dubious ranks of a celebrity, then I think, I would have a motor car to thank.’ Norah told her husband Sir Bernard Docker of her frustration that no one abroad had heard of Daimler cars. To boost the car's popularity, she asked Bernard: “Why can’t you manufacture a smaller Daimler, suitable for the family?” Bernard invited her to join the company and to take on the project.

1951 – The Gold Car (a.k.a. Golden Daimler)

The Gold Car was a touring limousine on the Thirty-Six Straight-Eight chassis. The car was covered with 7,000 tiny gold stars, and all plating that would normally have been chrome was gold. This car was taken to Paris, the United States and Australia.

1952 – Blue Clover

Also on the Thirty-Six Straight-Eight chassis, Blue Clover was a two-door sportsman's coupé.

1953 – Silver Flash

The Silver Flash was an aluminium-bodied coupé based on the 3-litre Regency chassis. Its accessories included solid silver hairbrushes and red fitted luggage made from crocodile skin.

1954 – Star Dust

based on the DF400 chassis. In 2014, the Star Dust limo, "finished with 5,000 sterling silver six-pointed stars" was sold after having been found in a barn in Wales in the 1980s.

1955 – Golden Zebra

The Golden Zebra was a two-door coupé based on the DK400 chassis. Like the Gold Car, the Golden Zebra had all its metal trim pieces plated in gold instead of chrome, and it had an ivory dashboard and zebra-skin upholstery.
