= Stanage Park =

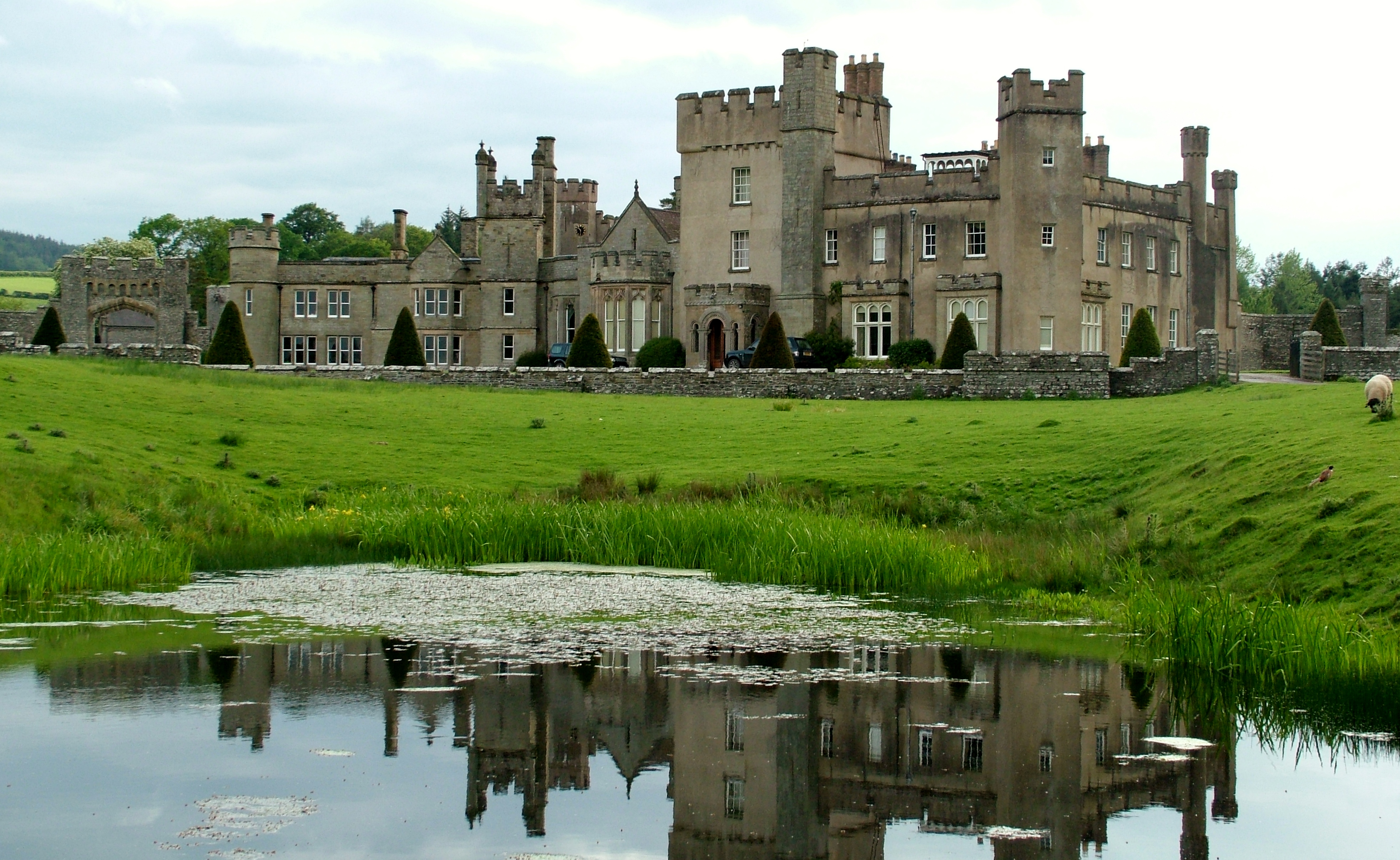

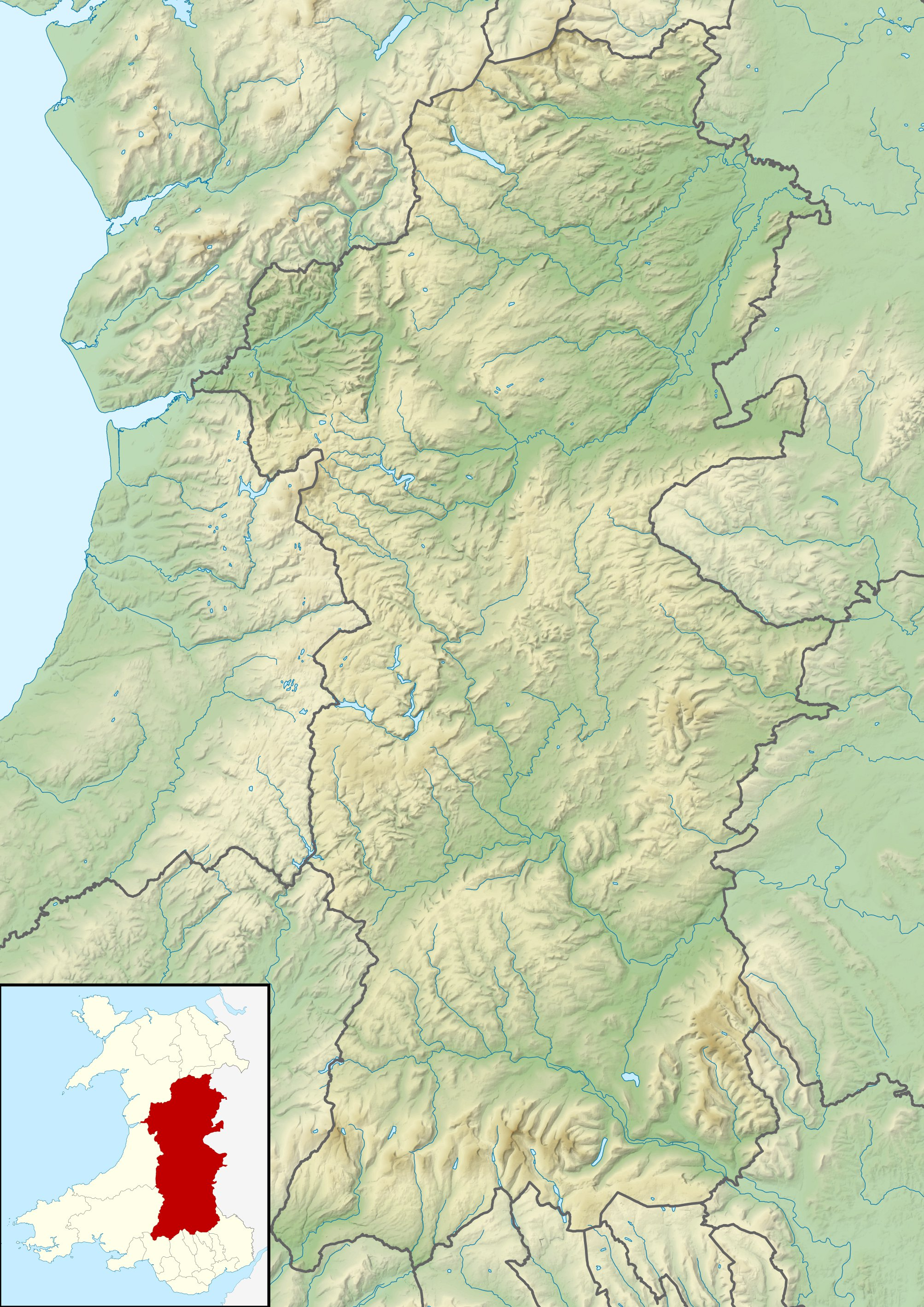
- Location within Powys
- 52.3396°N 2.9808°W
- Type: House
- Location: Knighton, Powys

History
- Built: 1803-1807

Site notes
- Architect: Humphry Repton
- Architectural style: Gothic Revival
- Governing body: Privately owned

Cadw/ICOMOS Register of Parks and Gardens of Special Historic Interest in Wales
- Official name: Stanage Park
- Designated: 1 February 2022
- Reference no.: PGW(Po)24(POW)
- Listing: Grade I

Listed Building – Grade II*
- Official name: Stanage Park
- Designated: 30 September 1985
- Reference no.: 9045

Listed Building – Grade II
- Official name: Stable courtyard at Stanage Park
- Designated: 30 September 1985
- Reference no.: 9049

Listed Building – Grade II
- Official name: Outer gateway, walls and outbuilding at stable courtyard to Stanage Park
- Designated: 30 September 1985
- Reference no.: 9047

Listed Building – Grade II
- Official name: Former game larder to south-west of stable courtyard at Stanage Park
- Designated: 30 September 1985
- Reference no.: 9050

Stanage Park is a Grade II* listed Welsh country house set in a large park located some 3 miles (4.8 km) east of Knighton, Powys near the settlement of Heartsease. The extensive parkland and the house were laid out by Humphry Repton and his son, John Adey Repton, in the early nineteenth century. Repton's picturesque parkland improvements, castellated house and enclosed garden survive almost intact. The estate is the last and most complete of his three recognized Welsh landscape commissions.

== History ==
The house was built 1803–07 by the Reptons for Charles Rogers in a picturesque castle style that was explicitly modelled on Richard Payne Knight's Downton Castle. John Repton designed an addition to the rear of the house in 1822. John Hiram Haycock added bay windows and his son Edward Haycock Senior remodelled some of the public rooms in a Tudorbethan style in 1833. Edward Haycock later added a Gothic dining-room extension, Romanesque-style porch and the castellated stable courtyard beginning in 1845. The billiard-room, south wing and baronial tower were added about 1867 The plans for the Repton's work are recorded in a 'Red Book', still kept at the house. The castle grounds are designated Grade I on the Cadw/ICOMOS Register of Parks and Gardens of Special Historic Interest in Wales.

== Description ==
The house is approached through the terraced lawns on the east front and the building has landscaped woodlands with a pond to the west. North and south of the building are wooded hillsides. The eastern terraces are enclosed by a low castellated wall to ha-has and there is a 1900 summer-house at the southeastern corner of the walls. The walls are periodically interrupted with rectangular exedras with classical urns atop piers.

== Associations ==
- The house and gardens featured in the TV drama series Blott on the Landscape.
- The area is also associated with the burial of the fifth century warlord Vortigern.

== Gallery ==
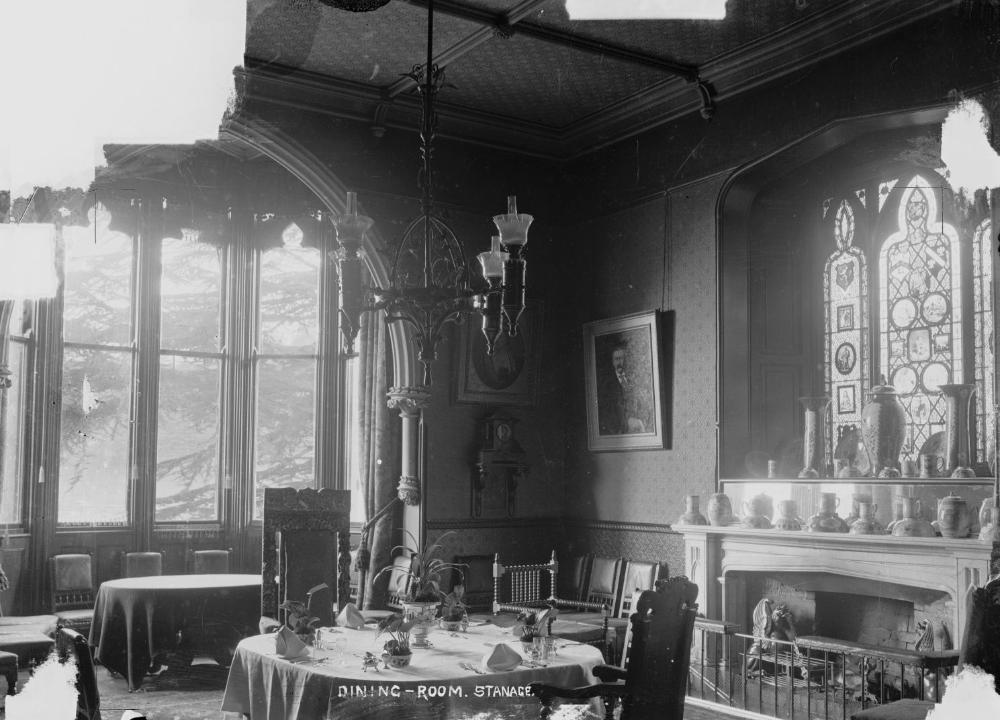
The dining-room c.1900s

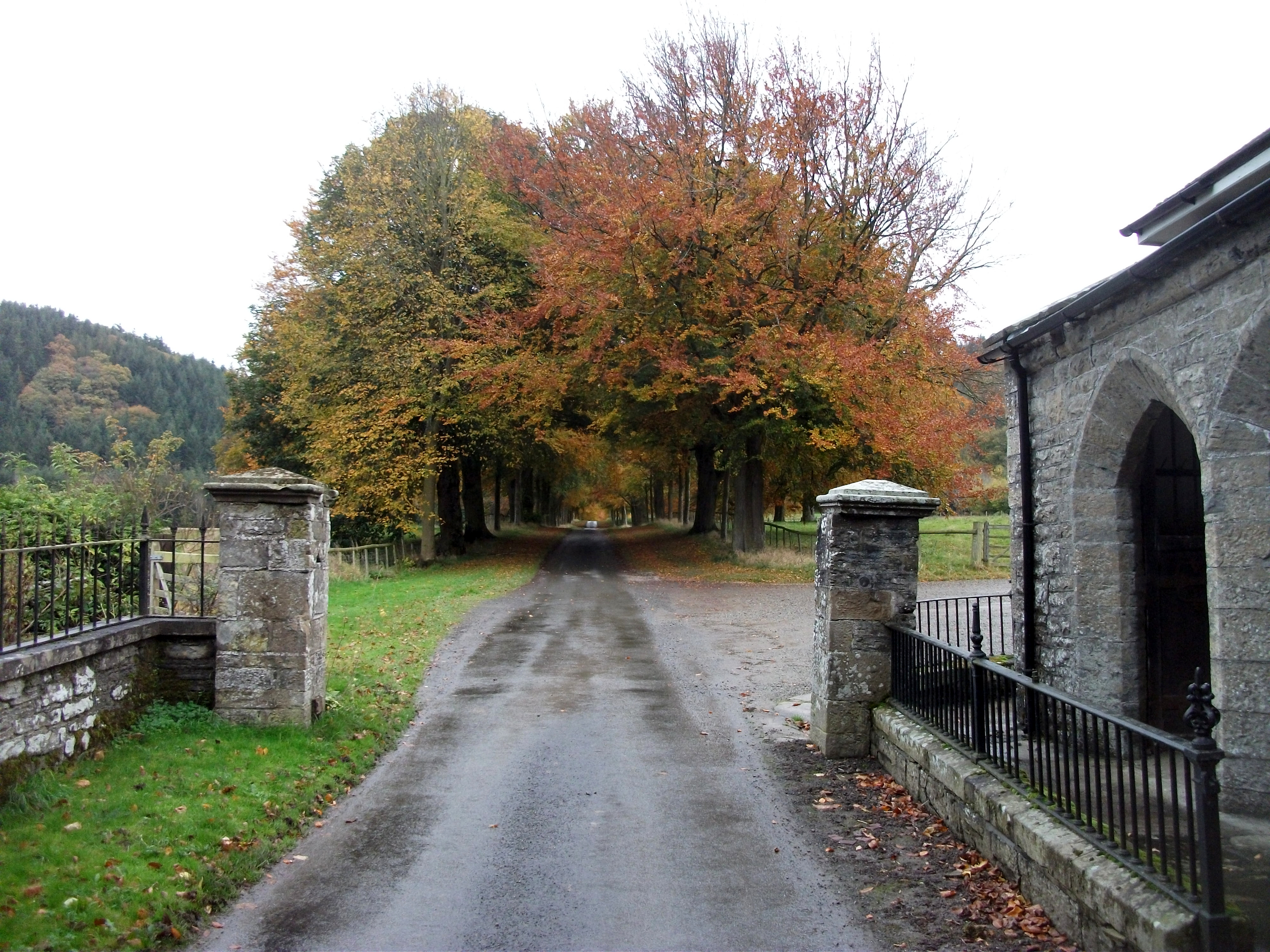
The drive

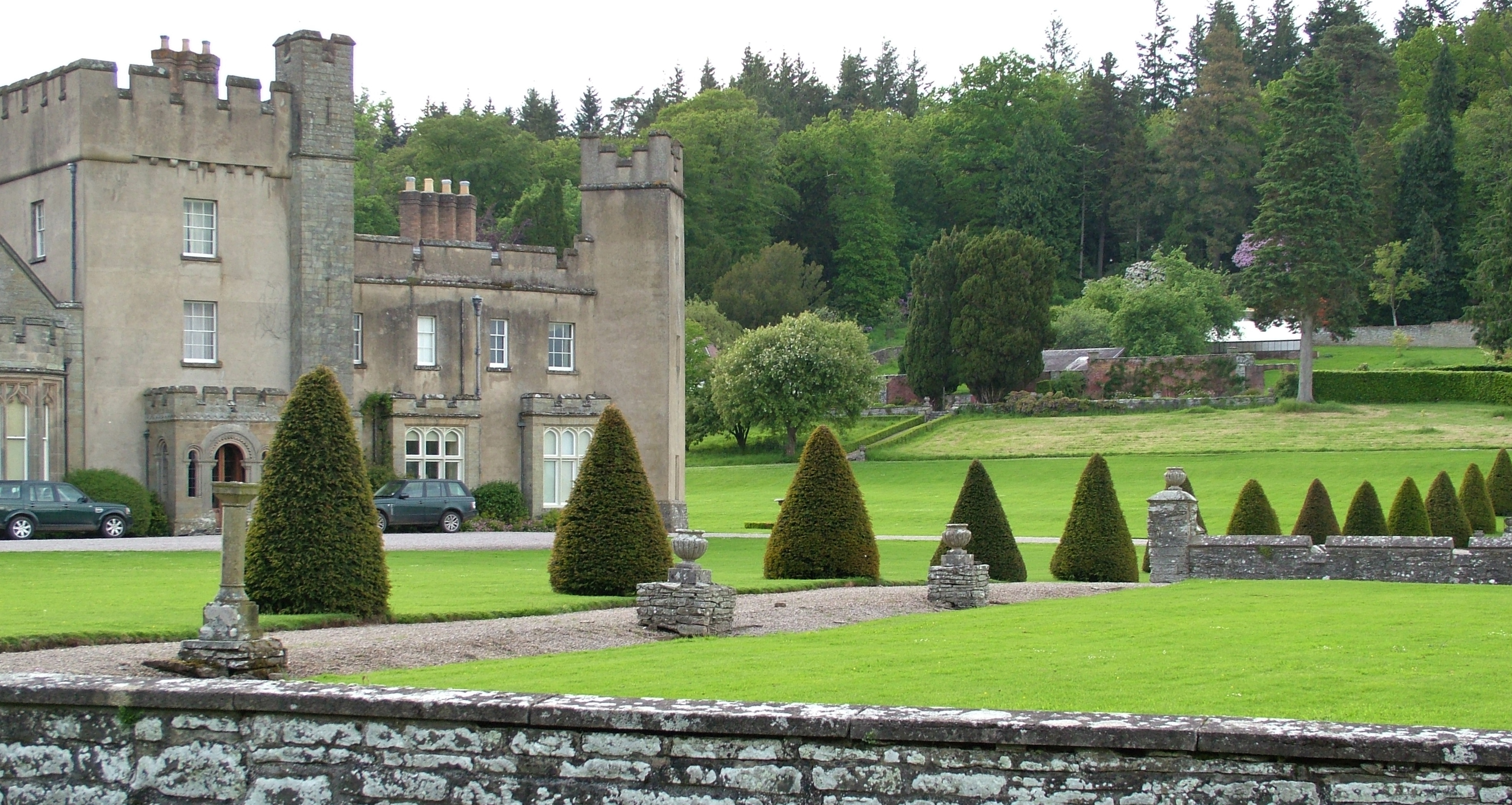
Formal gardens near to the house

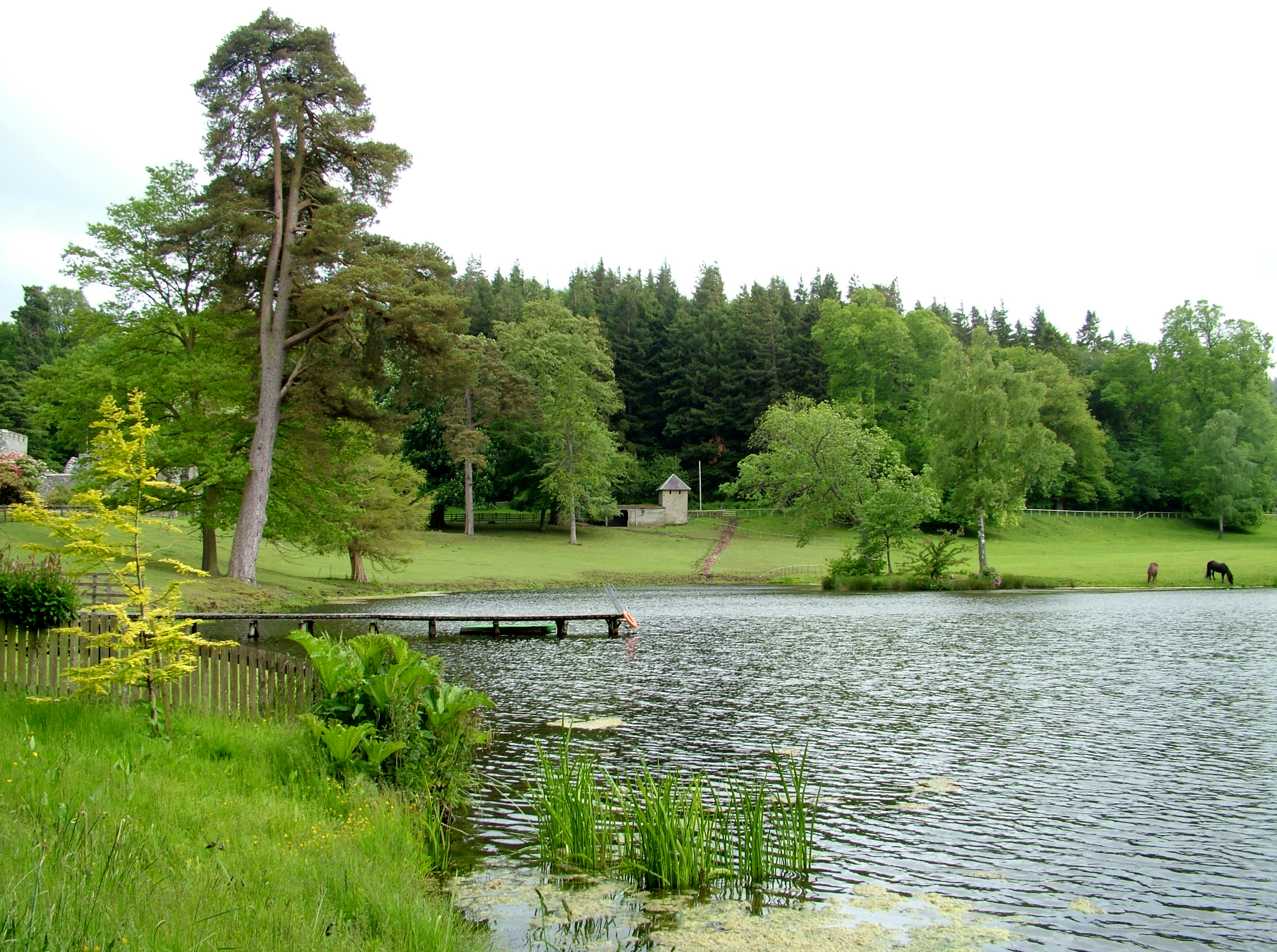
The lake
