= MY Shemara =

Motor yacht launched in 1938

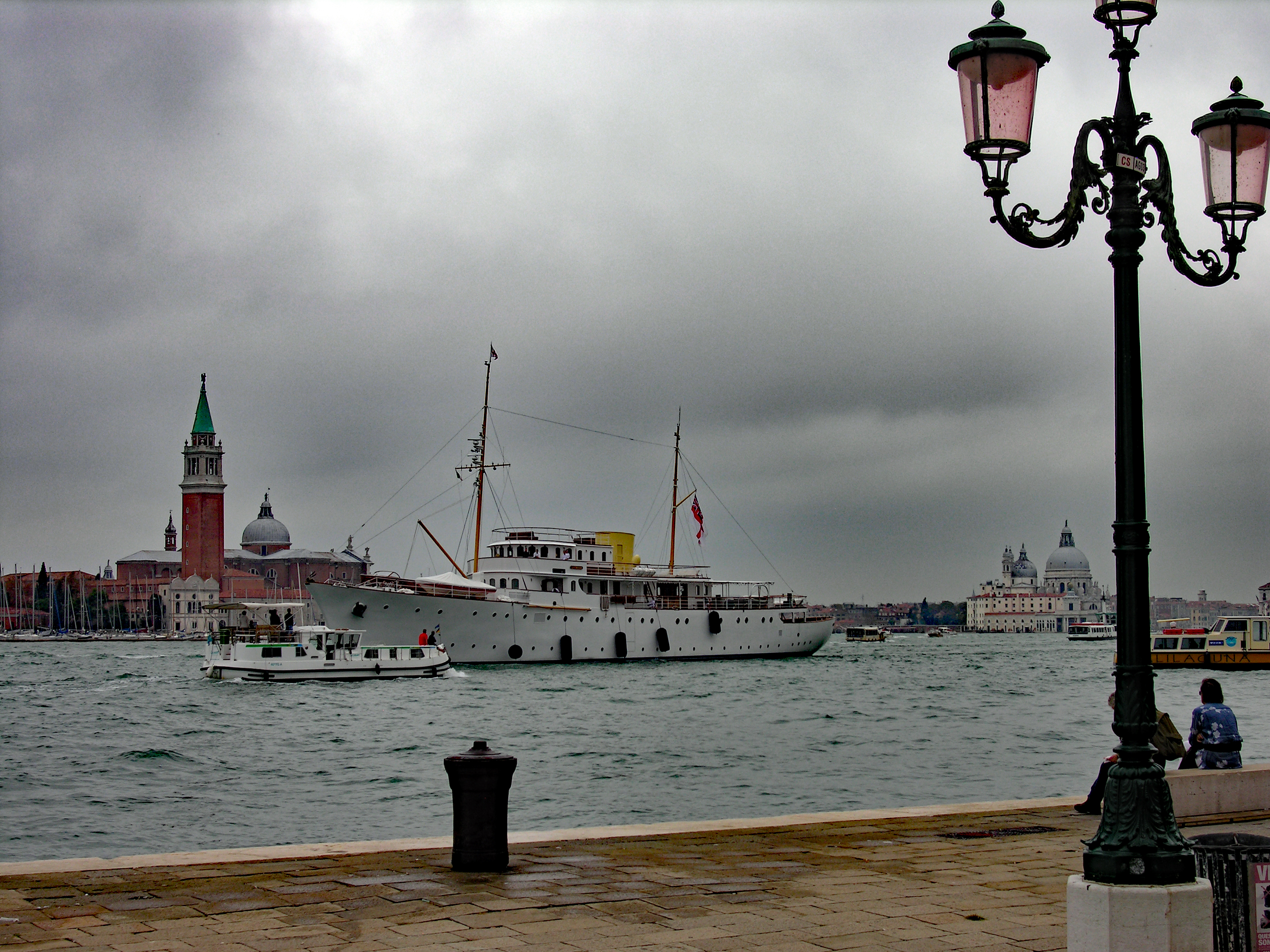
- Shemara in Venice in 2014

History

United Kingdom
- Name: Shemara
- Owner: Charles Dunstone
- Port of registry: London, United Kingdom
- Builder: John I. Thornycroft & Company
- Yard number: 1175
- Completed: 1938
- Refit: 2010-2014
- Identification: Call sign: GMGZ; IMO number: 8749717; MMSI number: 235104118

General characteristics
- Type: Motor yacht
- Length: 64.09 m (210.3 ft)
- Beam: 9.19 m (30.2 ft)
- Propulsion: Diesel-electric
- Speed: 14 knots (26 km/h; 16 mph)

MY Shemara is a motor yacht built in 1938 by John I. Thornycroft & Company to the order of Bernard Docker. Between 1939 and 1946 she served in the Royal Navy as HMS Shemara. As of 2015, Shemara is owned by Charles Dunstone, and is available for charter. She can carry 18 guests and 16 crew, is 64.09 m (210.3 ft) in length and 9.19 m (30.2 ft) in beam, and has a maximum speed of 14 knots (26 km/h; 16 mph).

== History ==
The English industrialist Bernard Docker commissioned John I. Thornycroft & Company to build a yacht to his specifications. The yacht was built at Thornycroft's yard at Woolston, Southampton. She was completed in 1938 and christened MY Shemara.

MY Shemara was requisitioned by the Royal Navy at the start of the Second World War in 1939 and used as a training vessel for anti-submarine warfare. (See also Madiz, a similar super yacht that saw RN Service in WWII). It was during a training exercise with HMS Shemara that the submarine HMS Untamed was lost with all her crew. Shemara left Royal Navy service in 1946.

Once returned to Docker's ownership, the Shemara became known for lavish parties with guests including King Farouk of Egypt. However, in 1965, Docker put her on the market for £600,000, and she was eventually sold to the property developer Harry Hyams for £290,000. Hyams used the Shemara on a number of Mediterranean cruises, but she was largely left laid up in Lowestoft, and was not regularly used between the 1980s and 2010.

In 2010 Shemara was bought by businessman Charles Dunstone, and a project was started to return her to her former glory. In order to achieve this, a new company, Shemara Refit LLP, was created. The refit was completed in 2014, and the yacht now has a contemporary interior while retaining many of her historic original features, including as much of her original steel and teak as possible. The ship's machinery was completely replaced with a new Rolls-Royce diesel-electric system comprising five main generators providing power for two electrically driven azimuthing pods and a bow thruster.

== Gallery ==
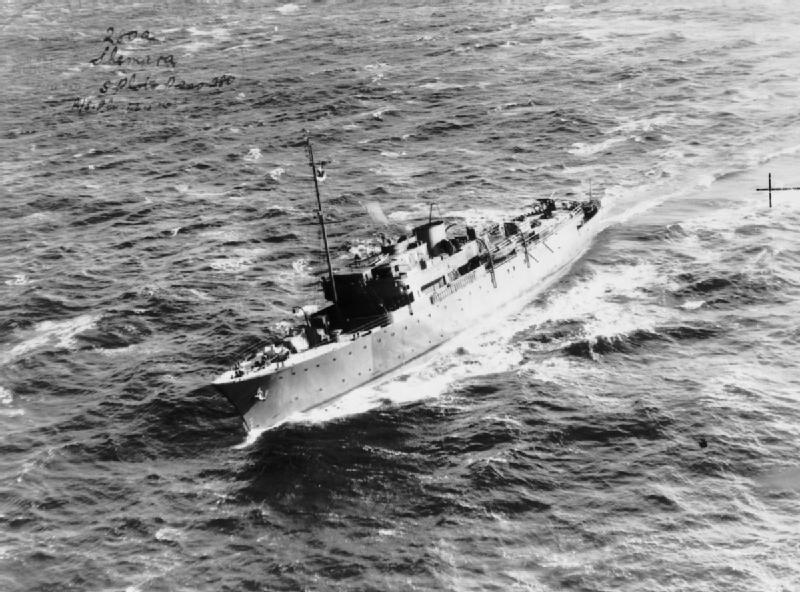
HMS Shemara during World War II

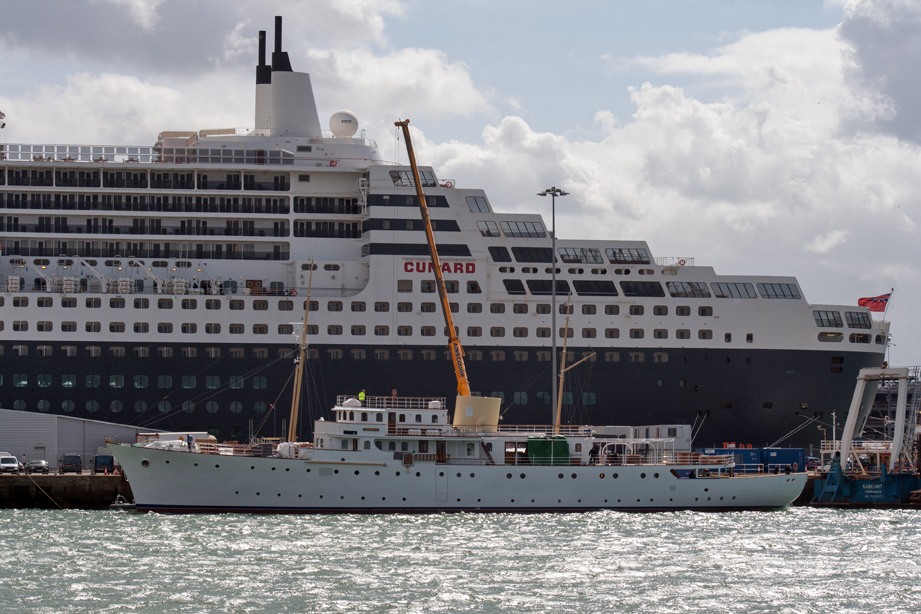
MY Shemara in Southampton in May 2014

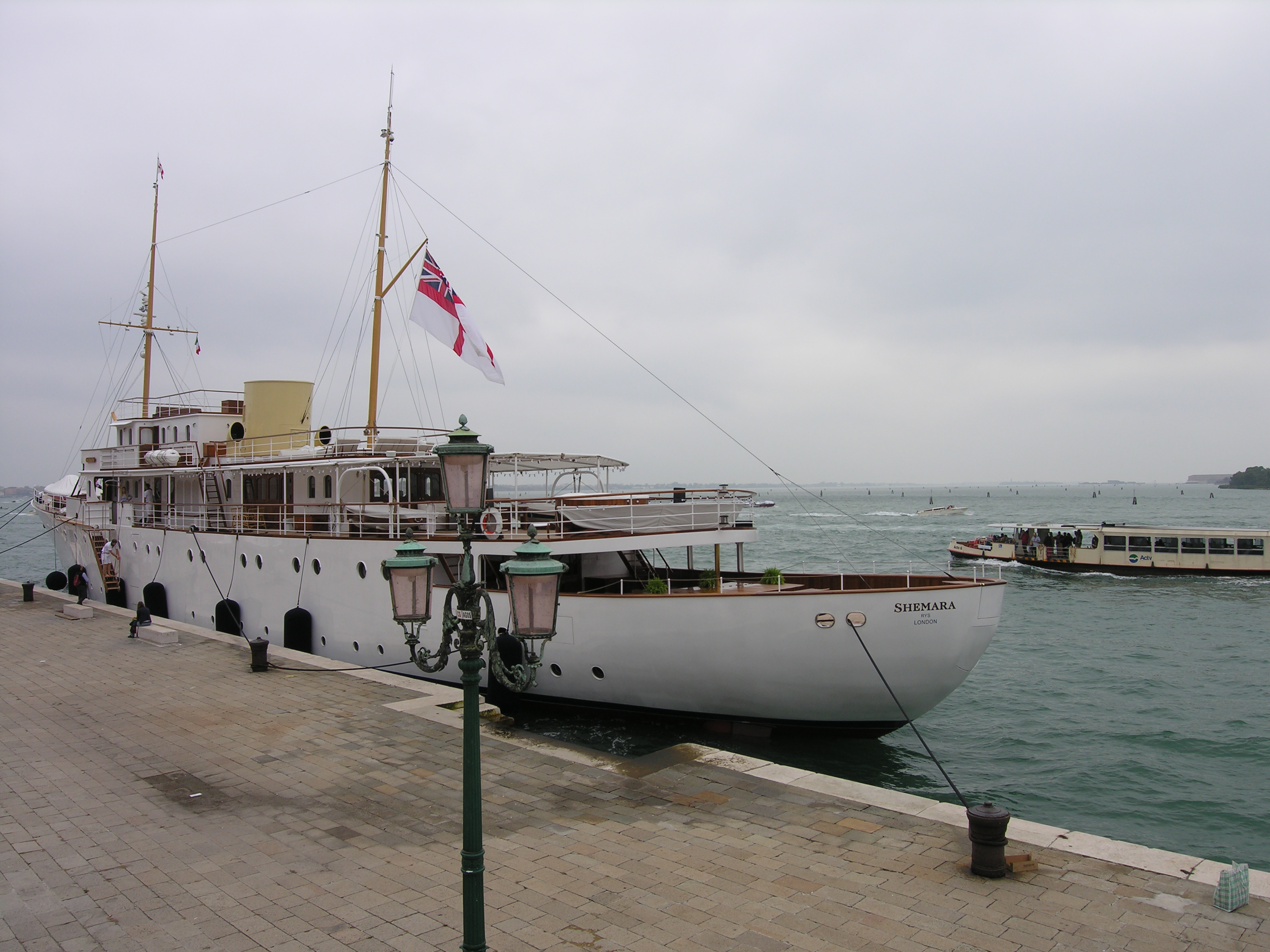
MY Shemara in Venice in October 2014
