= Don Short (journalist) =

British journalist (1932–2023)

- Born: Donald Clive Short; 23 November 1932; London, England
- Died: 3 May 2023 (aged 90)
- Occupations: Journalist and literary agent

Donald Clive Short (23 October 1932 – 3 May 2023) was a British writer, journalist and literary agent.

== Early life ==
Don Short was born in London and moved to Staines as a child. He went on to study journalism at Chiswick Polytechnic and his father, a cabinet maker and furniture shop owner, helped him secure a place at the Staines and Egham News local newspaper.

At the age of 18, Short was called up for National Service. He went to Nairobi with the RAF and inside base he launched a magazine. While he was in Nairobi he photographed Princess Elizabeth and the Duke of Edinburgh, days before Edward VI's death.

== Career ==
After returning to the Staines and Egham News, Short moved to Cirencester with his wife and began work at the Gloucestershire Echo. A few years later, Short started work at the Daily Sketch in Fleet Street and then the Daily Mirror in 1959. He got a world scoop about the marriage of Elizabeth Taylor and Eddie Fisher and was appointed to the role of Showbiz reporter at the Daily Mirror.

He went on to secure several world scoops, including the breakup of The Beatles and the drowning of Brian Jones. He was a friend and confidant of The Beatles. In 1964, The Beatles dined with Short and his wife and their six-year-old daughter at Short's home. Paul McCartney sang Don’s daughter a lullaby and days later, a disbelieving headmistress telephoned Don’s wife to verify the story, and she confirmed it was true. In the years that followed Short had become closer to The Beatles than any other journalist. Short has been credited with coining the term "Beatlemania".

Roy Greenslade said of Short: "I remember Don's story about the break-up [of The Beatles] because I was a news sub on The Sun at the time. When the first edition of the Mirror arrived, the newsdesk was unable to verify whether it was true. While we were dithering over what to do, wondering if we should follow the Mirror or not, the deputy editor (and former Mirror executive), Bernard Shrimsley, arrived on the floor to say: 'If Don Short says it's true then it is.' There cannot be a better tribute to a journalist than that. And he was, of course, bang on the money." He left the Mirror in 1974 after becoming the Mirror's Chief Showbiz Correspondent.

Short ghosted several books, including those of Swedish actress Britt Ekland, Peter Sellers, Lady Norah Docker, and an authorised biography of Engelbert Humperdinck.

Short established the Solo Literary Agency Ltd in 1978, which took over syndication for The Sun newspaper before moving on to the global market with stories and photos appearing in the Daily Mail, the Mail on Sunday and the Evening Standard. Short steered Solo in the direction of celebrity books as they were a lucrative concern for publishers for the first time and corresponded with his experience and contacts in the showbiz industry.

=== Later years ===
In November 2015, Short appeared on ITV's The Nation's Favourite Beatles Number One documentary. In 2020, Short published his autobiography, The Beatles and Beyond.

Short died of heart failure on 3 May 2023, at the age of 90.

== Works ==
- The Beatles and Beyond (Wymer, UK), ISBN 9781912782345, 2020.
