= 1940 to 1944 English cricket seasons =

Cricket season review

All first-class cricket in England and Wales was cancelled through the 1940 to 1944 seasons because of the Second World War; no first-class matches were played after Friday, 1 September 1939 until Saturday, 19 May 1945. Ten matches were cancelled at the end of the 1939 season due to the German invasion of Poland on 1 September, and the British government's declaration of war against Germany on Sunday, 3 September.

In contrast with much of the First World War, it was realised in the 1940s that cricket had its part to play in terms of raising both public morale and funds for charity. Efforts were made to stage matches whenever opportunities arose, especially if a suitable number of leading players could be assembled. From the summer of 1941 onwards, teams such as the British Empire XI toured the country raising money for war charities. Many of the semi-professional league competitions, including the prestigious Bradford and Lancashire Leagues, were able to continue through all five seasons.

Although eleven first-class matches were arranged during the 1945 season, following the final defeat of Germany in early May, it was not until the 1946 season that normal competitions, including the County Championship and the Minor Counties Championship, could resume.

== Wartime teams ==
Following the cancellation of first-class cricket in September 1939, there was a determination to keep the sport active in some form. As a result, many new teams were created to entertain the public and so raise morale, and also to raise money for wartime charities. Among the most prominent of the wartime teams were:

- Army (1940–1944)
- British Empire XI (1940–1944)
- Dominions (1943–1944)
- London Counties XI (1940–1944)
- New Zealand Services (1943–1944)
- RAF (1940–1944)
- RAAF (1942–1944)
- Navy (1941–1944)
- P. F. Warner's XI (1940–1943)
- West Indies XI (1940–1944)

Of these teams, the most famous were the British Empire XI and the London Counties XI, which were established in 1940. Both played one-day, single-innings charity matches, mostly in the south-east, and often at Lord's. The British Empire XI, which mainly featured English county players, was founded by Pelham Warner. The politician Desmond Donnelly, then in the Royal Air Force, began the London Counties XI. The two teams were prolific as CricketArchive records the British Empire XI playing 197 scorecarded matches between 5 May 1940 and 1 October 1944, an average of nearly forty per season. The London Counties XI is credited with 163 from 5 May 1940 to 10 September 1944, nearly 33 per season. The teams played each other six times.

Numerous service and civil defence organisations had their own teams, some of them national and featuring first-class players. County clubs encouraged their players to join the services, but at the same time pleaded with their members to continue subscriptions 'as an investment for the future'. While some counties—notably Somerset and Hampshire—closed for the duration, others did arrange matches. Nottinghamshire played six matches at Trent Bridge in 1940, and Lancashire mooted a scheme for a regionalised county competition to include the minor counties, but it was not taken further.

Although the wartime teams were successful in raising money for charities such as the Red Cross, their main purpose was to help sustain morale; the same applied to football in the autumn and winter months. Warner wrote that both the government and the services realised the need for sport, which 'provided a healthy and restful antidote to war strain'. He went on to remark that the stoppage of cricket at Lord's would have provided Goebbels with 'valuable propaganda'.

== 1940 ==
=== Beginning of the season ===
In the 1940 edition of Wisden Cricketers' Almanack, former player R. C. Robertson-Glasgow ('Crusoe') reviewed the 1939 season, and remarked that it was 'like peeping through the wrong end of a telescope at a very small but happy world'. In the same edition, cricket author Harry Altham described his 'sobering experience' when he visited Lord's in December 1939, saying: 'There were sandbags everywhere, and the Long Room was stripped and bare, with its treasures safely stored beneath ground, but one felt that somehow it would take more than totalitarian war to put an end to cricket'. Altham reflected the popular (and official) view that 'the game can and should be kept going whenever possible'.

One venue where the game could not be kept going was The Oval, which was commandeered in 1939 and turned into a prisoner-of-war camp, although no prisoners were ever interned there. The playing area became a maze of concrete posts and wire fences. Lord's was also due for requisition, but it was spared, and Marylebone Cricket Club (MCC) were able to stage many public school and representative games throughout the war to support charities.

A Mass-Observation survey, considering football in 1939–40, stated that 'sports like football have an absolute major effect on the morale of the people', and concluded that the continuation of sport was essential. This applied equally to cricket in 1940.

The season began quietly with no more than a dozen or so matches on record between 13 April and the beginning of the Norway Debate on Tuesday, 7 May. Following the debate, Winston Churchill became Prime Minister on 10 May, the same day that Hitler launched the blitzkrieg against Belgium, Luxembourg, and the Netherlands. Next day, a Saturday, several matches took place.

CricketArchive has listed a total of 272 matches played nationwide in 1940, between 13 April and 28 September, at venues as far afield as Jesmond and Torquay. Teams were formed by various civilian and military services. 28 matches were played at Lord's, starting on 4 May with teams representing the City of London Police and the London Fire Service. On 25 May, a BBC team played against one from the London Balloon Barrage, and on 26 June, the St Marylebone ARP met the Hampstead ARP (presumably, this was finished before blackout).

=== Highlights ===
One of the 11 May matches was a three-day game at Fenner's between Cambridge University and the British Empire XI. It concluded on the 14th with an innings victory for Cambridge. Empire batted first and were all out for 159 after Jack Webster took 5/55, and John Bridger took 4/25. Cambridge replied with a massive 518/5 declared, including three centuries scored by Eric Conradi (164), Bridger (145*), and John Thompson (100). Despite an innings of 138 by Norman Yardley, Empire were dismissed for 251 in their second innings, so Cambridge won by an innings and 108 runs.

The three biggest matches of the season, all played at Lord's, were British Empire XI against London Counties XI, who met twice, and P. F. Warner's XI against the West Indies XI. The first match was Empire against Counties on 13 July. Counties won by 104 runs, having scored 259/8 declared, and dismissed the Empire XI for 155. Counties had good innings by each of Joe Hulme (78*), Arthur Wellard (45), and Arthur Fagg (40). Their best bowler was Jack Durston, who took 4/51. Empire included Bertie Clarke and Denis Compton.

Empire played Counties again on 10 August, and scored 308/4 declared with Len Parslow making 101. Counties were all out for 255, and Empire won by 53 runs. Compton had a good all-round match, scoring 60 and then taking 6/81. The match was attended by about 13,000 spectators, and played on behalf of the Red Cross, for whom a collection raised £145, which is equivalent to £7,018 in 2025.

The match between Warner's XI and the West Indies XI was played on 22 August. Warner's XI batted first and scored 263; West Indies XI were all out for 146, so Warner's XI won by 117 runs. The West Indies team was not strong overall, but it did include Bertie Clarke, Learie Constantine, Manny Martindale, and Edwin St Hill. Warner's XI, however, had nine top-class players in Denis Compton, Ken Farnes, Billy Griffith, George Heane, Len Hutton, Walter Robins, Reg Taylor, Richard Twining, and Bryan Valentine. Earlier in the year, Taylor had been awarded the Distinguished Flying Cross (the DFC) for service as an observer in Bomber Command at Dunkirk. He was the first professional cricketer to be so honoured.

== 1941 ==
=== Bertie Clarke ===
The British Empire XI relied heavily on the skills of West Indian leg-spinner Bertie Clarke, who was exempt from military service because of his profession as a doctor. With his leg-breaks and googlies, he took 98 wickets for 11.40 runs apiece, and was to better this record in 1942. In contrast, the main players for the London Counties XI were veterans. Alf Gover was their most successful bowler with 83 wickets at 9.50 runs apiece.

=== Universities ===
From 1941 to 1945, the University Match was played annually at Lord's, but as a one-day match, and therefore not first-class. Fenner's was not commandeered, so Cambridge University were able to play nine matches in 1941. Their opponents included Sussex, and some strong military and hospital teams; Cambridge won four and lost one. Oxford University, on the other hand, were unable to play because The Parks was commandeered. Consequently, as expected, Cambridge won the one-day University Match; their outstanding player was John Bridger, who played for Hampshire after the war.

- Cricket in England in 1941

=== Highlights ===
On 16/17 May, Cambridge University played the British Empire XI at Fenner's. Cambridge scored 217 and 222/6 declared. In reply, Empire scored 199/6 declared and 234/8, so the match was drawn with Empire needing seven runs more and Cambridge needing two wickets. The sporting declarations by captains Ray Smith (Empire) and Greville Bayliss (CUCC) were instrumental in setting up the close finish. Empire's best players were former England captain Bob Wyatt, then aged 40, and the former New Zealand Test bowler Bill Merritt. Merritt, bowling leg spin and googly, took 7/112 in Cambridge's first innings (9/175 in the match). Wyatt scored 70 and 149 in his two innings.

=== School cricket ===
In public school cricket, Dulwich College were successful, largely thanks to Trevor Bailey, who scored 851 runs in fifteen innings, in eight of which he was not out. Dulwich also had the best school bowler in Horace Kiddle, who took fifty wickets; he was killed in action in April 1944.

Future Worcestershire bowler George Chesterton, playing for Malvern College, took 45 wickets at 12.88 runs apiece, but was not included in Wisden's best school eleven. Edward Spooner, a son of Lancashire batsman Reggie, averaged 49.50 for Eton, and was tipped for a big future, but he never played first-class cricket.

== 1942 ==
As the war grew more intense, Lord's was still able to expand its profits, with 1942 described as 'the best wartime season Lord's has had'. Jack Robertson came to prominence with an innings of 102 for Army against Navy.

Eddie Paynter scored 970 runs at an average of 138.50 for Keighley in the Bradford League. Trevor Bailey and Tony Mallett were praised by Wisden for their all-round form and the quality of their fast-medium bowling. Essex veteran Jack O’Connor scored 208 – the only double-century in wartime cricket – in a two-day match on 4 and 5 July against Peterborough., whilst Clarke surpassed his 1942 record for the Empire XI. In public school cricket, the most significant discovery was Nigel Howard of Rossall School, who scored 456 runs at an average of 45 and took twenty-four cheap wickets, whilst future Derbyshire captain Donald Carr made his debut for Repton as a spin bowler.

- Cricket in England in 1942

== 1943 ==
A drawn one-day match at Lord's between an England XI and a West Indies XI featured the young Alec Bedser and Trevor Bailey. Bedser made his mark by taking 6/27 in the West Indies first innings. In the drawn Sir PF Warner's XI v Royal Australian Air Force match at Lord's, Keith Miller top-scored in the RAAF's first innings, with 45 out of 100, as well as taking 2/20. The RAAF won a two-day match against The South at Hove by ten wickets. A strong England XI beat The Dominions by 8 runs in a two-day match at Lord's. Les Ames made 133 in the England first innings, and Denis Compton then took 6/15 in eight overs. In their second innings, The Dominions came close to snatching an unlikely victory, with Stewie Dempster making 113.

- Cricket in England in 1943

== 1944 ==
At Lord's, two one-day matches were played by an England XI against 'West Indies' and 'Australia', England winning both matches. (These were not limited overs matches.) Jack Young, unknown before the war but later to win two County Championships with Middlesex, took 88 wickets for London Counties XI at 7.63 runs apiece.

- Cricket in England in 1944

(placeholder) The 'doodlebug match' between Army and RAF was at Lord's on 29 July. This was the best known instance of bombing in the vicinity of Lord's. Play was temporarily interrupted when a V-1 flying bomb landed nearby. The players threw themselves to the ground, and then carried on playing after the explosion. On resumption, Jack Robertson defiantly hit the next delivery for six. Wisden at Lord's has two photographs of the incident under the caption 'Flying bomb stops play'.

== Postscript ==
When the 1944 season ended, the Western Allies had liberated almost all of France and Belgium, and it was hoped that the end of the European war was imminent. However, it was not until May 1945 that Germany finally surrendered, and it was by then too late to organise a County Championship, though eleven first-class matches were played in the 1945 season. As Wisden editor Hubert Preston said in his 1946 editorial:

After five seasons of what may be called impromptu cricket the sudden end of the European war came just in time to permit a partial resumption of the first-class game last summer.

There was a full return to normality in the 1946 season with the County Championship, the Minor Counties Championship, and the arrival of the Indian tourists to play a three-match Test series against England.

== Bibliography ==
- Birley, Derek (1999). A Social History of English Cricket. London: Aurum Press. ISBN 978-18-54107-10-7 – via Internet Archive.
- Jenkins, Roy (2001). Churchill. London: MacMillan. ISBN 978-03-30488-05-1.
- Lemmon, David (1989). The History of Surrey County Cricket Club. London: Christopher Helm. ISBN 978-07-47020-10-3.
- Shakespeare, Nicholas (2017). Six Minutes in May. London: Vintage. ISBN 978-17-84701-00-0.
- Warner, Pelham (1946b). Lords: 1787–1945. London: Harrap. OCLC 877106024.
- Wisden (1942). Whitaker, Haddon (ed.). Wisden Cricketers' Almanack (79th ed.). London: Sporting Handbooks Ltd. OCLC 851705816.
- Wisden (1943). Whitaker, Haddon (ed.). Wisden Cricketers' Almanack (80th ed.). London: Sporting Handbooks Ltd. OCLC 851705816.
- Wisden (1947). Preston, Hubert (ed.). Wisden Cricketers' Almanack (84th ed.). London: Sporting Handbooks Ltd. OCLC 851705816.
- Wright, Graeme, ed. (2005). Wisden at Lord's. London: Wisden. ISBN 978-09-47766-93-1.
