= 1939 English cricket season =

Cricket season review

1939 was the 46th cricket season in England since the introduction of the County Championship in 1890. It was the one and only season in which English cricket adopted the eight-ball over. 1939 was the last season before the Second World War and it was not until 1946 that first-class cricket could resume in England on a normal basis. The West Indies were on tour and England won the Test series 1–0. The West Indian team departed early, with several matches cancelled, because of the growing international crisis.

== Honours ==
- County Championship – Yorkshire
- Minor Counties Championship – Surrey II
- Wisden Cricketers of the Year – Learie Constantine, Bill Edrich, Walter Keeton, Fred Price, Brian Sellers

== Test series ==
England played three Tests against West Indies, whose team included George Headley and Learie Constantine. The latter was recognised by Wisden in its 1940 edition as one of its "Five Cricketers of the Year" for 1939.

England won the first Test by 8 wickets and the other two were drawn:

- First Test at Lord's – England won by 8 wickets
- Second Test at Old Trafford – match drawn
- Third Test at The Oval – match drawn

The third Test was completed on Tuesday, 22 August, the day before the signing of the Molotov–Ribbentrop Pact which itself gave rise to passage of the Emergency Powers (Defence) Act 1939 by the UK Parliament on the 24th. Realising the gravity of the international crisis, the West Indian tourists cancelled their four remaining fixtures and sailed for home. The first of those was due to be played against Sussex at the County Ground, Hove, starting on Saturday, 26 August; the later three would have been against Kent, an England XI and H. D. G. Leveson-Gower's XI.

== County Championship ==
The 1939 County Championship was determined on an average points basis because the county teams did not all play the same number of matches, the range varying from 24 to 32. Yorkshire won the title for the third successive season, playing 30 matches with 20 wins and 2 defeats to produce a points average of 9.286. Middlesex were the runners-up with 8.182 from 26 matches with 13 wins and 3 defeats.

Yorkshire were captained by Brian Sellers, whose efforts earned him a place in Wisden's "Five Cricketers of the Year". The team had five batsmen who all scored more than 1,000 championship runs: Len Hutton (2,167), Wilf Barber (1,388), Herbert Sutcliffe (1,230), Maurice Leyland (1,191) and Arthur Mitchell (1,087). The bowling depended on Hedley Verity (165 wickets), Ellis Robinson (102), Bill Bowes (96) and Frank Smailes (49). The wicket-keeper was Arthur Wood who completed 39 catches and 27 stumpings. Other players included Cyril Turner and future England captain Norman Yardley.

Runners-up Middlesex were well served by Test batsmen Bill Edrich (1,948 runs), Denis Compton (1,853) and Jack Robertson (1,562). Wicket-keeper Fred Price had an outstanding season with 53 catches and 20 stumpings. Middlesex relied heavily on its two main bowlers Jim Sims (142 wickets) and Jim Smith (84). Edrich was recognised by Wisden as one of its "Five Cricketers of the Year".

Gloucestershire finished third under England captain Wally Hammond who scored 2,121 championship runs. Other good performers for Gloucestershire were batsmen Charlie Barnett, Jack Crapp and George Emmett; seam bowler Colin Scott and the outstanding spin bowler Tom Goddard who took 181 championship wickets.

Noted batsmen at other counties were John Langridge (Sussex) with 2,106 championship runs; Les Ames (Kent), Joe Hardstaff junior (Nottinghamshire), Arthur Fagg (Kent), Eddie Paynter (Lancashire), Harold Gimblett (Somerset) and Laurie Fishlock (Surrey) who all made more than 1,700 runs. Walter Keeton of Nottinghamshire was recognised by Wisden as one of its "Five Cricketers of the Year" after he scored 312* against Middlesex, which was the highest individual score of the 1939 season and remains the highest ever made for Nottinghamshire.

Noted bowlers elsewhere were Reg Perks (Worcestershire) and Doug Wright (Kent), the only others to take more than 130 championship wickets.

== Leading batsmen – all first-class matches ==
George Headley had the highest average of batsmen who played in more than a handful of matches. He scored 1,745 runs at an average of 72.60 runs per completed innings with a highest score of 234*. The highest runscorer was Len Hutton with 2,883 at 62.67 with a highest score of 280*. Other leading batsmen were Wally Hammond, Denis Compton, Bill Edrich, Joe Hardstaff junior and John Langridge who all scored more than 2,000 runs.

== Leading bowlers – all first-class matches ==
Hedley Verity had the best average of regular bowlers with 191 wickets at 13.13 runs per wicket with best figures of 9/62. It turned out to be Verity's final season as he was killed in action during the war. In his last appearance on 1 September, he took 7 for 9 as Yorkshire "skittled" Sussex for only 33. The most wickets were taken by Tom Goddard with 200 at 14.86 with best figures of 9/38. Other leading bowlers were Reg Perks, Jim Sims, Bill Copson and Doug Wright who all took more than 140 wickets.

== Debutants ==
Among the first-class debutants in 1939 were future England players Alec Bedser, Godfrey Evans, Cliff Gladwin and Willie Watson. Those whose first-class careers ended in 1939 include Ken Farnes and Hedley Verity who were both killed in action during the war.

== Immediate impact of the war ==
The season was almost over when war was declared on Sunday, 3 September and only ten first-class matches were cancelled. Four were due to begin on Saturday, 2 September but all were delayed due to the emergency and then cancelled after the declaration of war. Two earlier games involving the West Indian tourists had already been cancelled. Four remaining games, including Gentlemen v Players, were due to begin on different days during the following week and all were cancelled.

The final matches played before the war were six County Championship games that began on Wednesday, 30 August and were completed on or before Friday, 1 September, the day the Wehrmacht invaded Poland. Three of these games were completed with a result on the second day. Two more were ended as draws by agreement on the Friday morning after news of the invasion was reported.

The last match to be completed was Sussex v Yorkshire at Hove. From an overnight position of 330–3 in the first innings, chasing a Sussex score of 387, Yorkshire continued on the Friday morning and totalled 392 all out. Sussex collapsed in their second innings and were all out for only 33, whereupon Yorkshire made 30–1 to win by nine wickets. That ended the 1939 season, and also marked the end of first-class cricket in England until the first of the Victory Tests began on 19 May 1945.

The few remaining county matches were cancelled immediately and Derek Birley commented that there was "none of the unfortunate disposition to linger over it as in 1914". Cricket in 1939 accepted the inevitable, summarised in the September 1939 issue of The Cricketer by Sir Home Gordon who found a suitable metaphor: "England has now begun the grim Test match against Germany".

The Third Test was the last match played at The Oval in 1939. Soon after war was declared, the ground was requisitioned and modified for use as a prisoner-of-war camp, but no prisoners were ever held there. Lord's was prepared for a similar fate but the authorities decided against it and Lord's was able to stage many games throughout the war to raise money for charity.

Despite the summer-long forebodings, MCC had gone ahead with choosing a team of available players for the scheduled tour of India in the autumn and winter of 1939–40. The tour was cancelled as soon as war broke out, and many of the chosen players lost their only chance of representing England in Test cricket. The team would have been managed by Claude Rubie, and captained by Jack Holmes of Sussex.

H. S. Altham wrote in 1940 about a visit to Lord's in December 1939 as "a sobering experience; there were sandbags everywhere and the Long Room was stripped bare with its treasures safely stored below ground". Having painted a bleak picture thus far, Altham ended on a note of defiance: "but the turf was a wondrous green, Old Father Time on the Grand Stand roof was gazing serenely at the nearest (barrage) balloon and one felt that somehow it would take more than totalitarian war to put an end to cricket".

In the 1940 edition of Wisden Cricketers' Almanack, author R. C. Robertson-Glasgow reviewed the 1939 season and remarked that it was "like peeping through the wrong end of a telescope at a very small but happy world".

== Bibliography ==
- Birley, Derek (1999). A Social History of English Cricket. London: Aurum Press Ltd. ISBN 978-18-54107-10-7.
- Caple, S. Canynge (1959). England versus India: 1886–1959. Worcester: Littlebury & Co. Ltd. OCLC 451210.
- Jennings, W. Ivor (1940). "The Emergency Powers (Defence) (No. 2) Act, 1940". Modern Law Review. 4 (2): 132–136. doi:10.1111/j.1468-2230.1940.tb02739.x. JSTOR 1090251.
- Sandford, Christopher, The Final Innings: The Cricketers of Summer 1939, Cheltenham: The History Press, 2019
- Wright, Graeme, ed. (2005). Wisden at Lord's. Alton, Hampshire: John Wisden & Co. Ltd. ISBN 978-09-47766-93-1.
