= List of bowlers who have taken a wicket with their first ball in a format of international cricket =

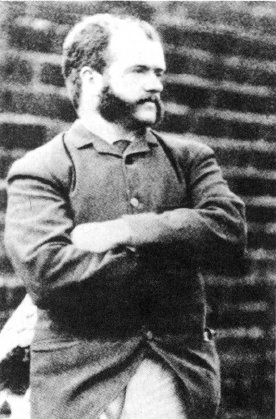
Tom Horan was the first bowler to take a wicket with his first delivery in Test cricket.

This is a list of bowlers who have taken a wicket with the first ball they bowled in one of the three formats of international cricket.

In Test cricket, 25 bowlers have taken a wicket with their first delivery. The first was Australian Tom Horan, who dismissed Walter Read with his first ball on 26 January 1883. However, this accomplishment has not led to a long career. Only Maurice Tate, Keith Miller, Intikhab Alam and Nathan Lyon went on to play in more than ten Tests. Arthur Coningham, Matt Henderson, Dennis Smith, and Tyrell Johnson each played only one Test. Smith's first-ball wicket was also his only wicket in Test cricket.

In One Day International (ODI) matches, 33 bowlers have taken a wicket with their first ball. The first to accomplish this was English bowler Geoff Arnold, who bowled Graeme Watson on 24 August 1972. Not all of these bowlers took their first wicket in their debut match. Clive Lloyd, Inzamam-ul-Haq, Sadagoppan Ramesh, and Martin van Jaarsveld did not bowl in their debut matches, and took their first wicket on a later appearance. Ramesh and Wavell Hinds took their first wickets during the same match on 6 September 1999; the former in the first innings of the match and the latter in the second. It was also the only wicket taken by Ramesh during his ODI career.

In Twenty20 International (T20I) cricket, 36 bowlers have taken a wicket with their first ball, including 4 women cricketers. The first to achieve this feat was Australian Michael Kasprowicz who took wickets with his first and second delivery in this format on 17 May 2005, dismissing New Zealand's Stephen Fleming and Mathew Sinclair. Nadeem Ahmed of Hong Kong and Paras Khadka of Nepal took their first wickets during the same match on 16 March 2014; the former in the first innings of the match and the latter in the second. The first woman cricketer to do this was Chloe Tryon who did it against West Indies in 2010.

== Key ==
No.	Numerical order of bowler
Bowler	The name of the bowler
Date	The date the wicket was taken
Venue	The cricket ground where the wicket was taken
For	The team the bowler was playing for
Against	The opposing team
Batsman	The batsman whose wicket was taken
Dismissal	The type of dismissal

== Wicket with first ball in Test career ==
No.	Bowler	Date	Venue	For	Against	Batsman	Dismissal	Ref(s)
1	Tom Horan	26 January 1883	Sydney Cricket Ground, Sydney	Australia	England	Walter Read	bowled	
2	Arthur Coningham	29 December 1894	Melbourne Cricket Ground, Melbourne	Australia	England	Archie MacLaren	c Harry Trott	
3	Bill Bradley	17 July 1899	Old Trafford Cricket Ground, Manchester	England	Australia	Frank Laver	c Dick Lilley	
4	Ted Arnold	11 December 1903	Sydney Cricket Ground, Sydney	England	Australia	Victor Trumper	c RE Foster	
5	Bert Vogler	2 January 1906	Old Wanderers, Johannesburg	South Africa	England	Ernie Hayes	caught & bowled	
6	Jack Crawford	2 January 1906	Old Wanderers, Johannesburg	England	South Africa	Bert Vogler	bowled	
7	George Macaulay	1 January 1923	Newlands Cricket Ground, Cape Town	England	South Africa	George Hearne	c Percy Fender	
8	Maurice Tate	16 June 1924	Edgbaston Stadium, Birmingham	England	South Africa	Fred Susskind	bowled	
9	Matt Henderson	10 January 1930	Lancaster Park, Christchurch	New Zealand	England	Eddie Dawson	c Tom Lowry	
10	Dennis Smith	24 March 1933	Lancaster Park, Christchurch	New Zealand	England	Eddie Paynter	bowled	
11	Tyrell Johnson	19 August 1939	The Oval, London	West Indies	England	Walter Keeton	bowled	
12	Keith Miller	30 March 1946	Basin Reserve, Wellington	Australia	New Zealand	Walter Hadlee	bowled	
13	Dick Howorth	18 August 1947	The Oval, London	England	South Africa	Dennis Dyer	c Cliff Gladwin	
14	Intikhab Alam	5 December 1959	National Stadium, Karachi	Pakistan	Australia	Colin McDonald	bowled	
15	Richard Illingworth	5 July 1991	Trent Bridge, Nottingham	England	West Indies	Phil Simmons	bowled	
16	Nilesh Kulkarni	3 August 1997	R. Premadasa Stadium, Colombo	India	Sri Lanka	Marvan Atapattu	c Nayan Mongia	
17	Chamila Gamage	29 July 2002	Sinhalese Sports Club Ground, Colombo	Sri Lanka	Bangladesh	Mohammad Ashraful	bowled	
18	Nathan Lyon	1 September 2011	Galle International Stadium, Galle	Australia	Sri Lanka	Kumar Sangakkara	c Michael Clarke	
19	Shaminda Eranga	16 September 2011	Sinhalese Sports Club Ground, Colombo	Sri Lanka	Australia	Shane Watson	c Tillakaratne Dilshan	
20	Dane Piedt	9 August 2014	Harare Sports Club, Harare	South Africa	Zimbabwe	Mark Vermeulen	lbw	
21	Hardus Viljoen	15 January 2016	Wanderers Stadium, Johannesburg	South Africa	England	Alastair Cook	c Dane Vilas	
22	Nijat Masood	14 June 2023	Sher-e-Bangla National Cricket Stadium, Mirpur	Afghanistan	Bangladesh	Zakir Hasan	c Afsar Zazai	
23	Shamar Joseph	17 January 2024	Adelaide Oval, Adelaide	West Indies	Australia	Steve Smith	c Justin Greaves	
24	Tshepo Moreki	4 February 2024	Bay Oval, Mount Maunganui	South Africa	New Zealand	Devon Conway	lbw	
25	Corbin Bosch	26 December 2024	Centurion Park, Centurion	South Africa	Pakistan	Shan Masood	c Marco Jansen	

As of 26 December 2024. Source: ESPNcricinfo.

== Wicket with first ball in ODI career ==
No	Bowler	Date	Venue	For	Against	Batsman	Dismissal	Ref.
1	Geoff Arnold	24 August 1972	Old Trafford Cricket Ground, Manchester	England	Australia	Graeme Watson	bowled	
2	Clive Lloyd	7 August 1973	The Oval, London	West Indies	England	Andrew Smith	bowled	
3	Shahid Mehboob	31 December 1982	Gaddafi Stadium, Lahore	Pakistan	India	Kris Srikkanth	c Zaheer Abbas	
4	Shane Thomson	1 March 1990	Carisbrook, Dunedin	New Zealand	India	Mohammad Azharuddin	c Mark Greatbatch	
5	Inzamam-ul-Haq	24 November 1991	Iqbal Stadium, Faisalabad	Pakistan	West Indies	Brian Lara	c Moin Khan	
6	Everton Matambanadzo	3 November 1996	Arbab Niaz Stadium, Peshawar	Zimbabwe	Pakistan	Shahid Afridi	c John Rennie	
7	Sadagoppan Ramesh	6 September 1999	Kallang Ground, Singapore	India	West Indies	Nixon McLean	c Debasis Mohanty	
8	Wavell Hinds	6 September 1999	Kallang Ground, Singapore	West Indies	India	Mannava Prasad	c Nehemiah Perry	
9	Josephat Ababu	25 September 1999	Gymkhana Club Ground, Nairobi	Kenya	Zimbabwe	Neil Johnson	bowled	
10	Charitha Buddhika	26 October 2001	Sharjah Cricket Stadium, Sharjah	Sri Lanka	Zimbabwe	Dougie Marillier	lbw	
11	Martin van Jaarsveld	9 October 2002	De Beers Diamond Oval, Kimberley	South Africa	Bangladesh	Talha Jubair	bowled	
12	Monde Zondeki	6 December 2002	Goodyear Park, Bloemfontein	South Africa	Sri Lanka	Marvan Atapattu	c Andrew Hall	
13	Kaushal Lokuarachchi	6 April 2003	Sharjah Cricket Stadium, Sharjah	Sri Lanka	Kenya	Steve Tikolo	c Avishka Gunawardene	
14	Rikki Clarke	17 June 2003	Old Trafford Cricket Ground, Manchester	England	Pakistan	Imran Nazir	c Vikram Solanki	
15	Fidel Edwards	29 November 2003	Harare Sports Club, Harare	West Indies	Zimbabwe	Barney Rogers	bowled	
16	Kevin O'Brien	13 June 2006	Stormont, Belfast	Ireland	England	Andrew Strauss	c Andre Botha	
17	Elijah Otieno	18 October 2007	Gymkhana Club Ground, Nairobi	Kenya	Canada	Mohammad Iqbal	c Morris Ouma	
18	Thilan Thushara	15 April 2008	Beausejour Stadium, Saint Lucia	Sri Lanka	West Indies	Runako Morton	c Kumar Sangakkara	
19	Parth Desai	13 April 2010	Sabina Park, Jamaica	Canada	West Indies	Andre Fletcher	c Rizwan Cheema	
20	Bhuvneshwar Kumar	30 December 2012	MA Chidambaram Stadium, Chennai	India	Pakistan	Mohammad Hafeez	bowled	
21	Kenneth Kamyuka	13 October 2013	Maple Leaf Cricket Club, King City, Ontario	Canada	Netherlands	Daan van Bunge	bowled	
22	Andrew Mathieson	20 June 2015	Riverside Ground, Chester-le-Street	New Zealand	England	Jason Roy	c Martin Guptill	
23	Ehsan Khan	8 September 2016	The Grange Club, Edinburgh	Hong Kong	Scotland	Craig Wallace	lbw	
24	Mosaddek Hossain	28 September 2016	Shere Bangla National Stadium, Mirpur	Bangladesh	Afghanistan	Hashmatullah Shahidi	lbw	
25	Keemo Paul	15 March 2018	Harare Sports Club, Harare	West Indies	Afghanistan	Javed Ahmadi	lbw	
26	Ainsley Ndlovu	19 June 2019	Sportpark Het Schootsveld, Deventer	Zimbabwe	Netherlands	Tobias Visee	lbw	
27	Lizaad Williams	16 July 2021	Malahide Cricket Club Ground, Malahide	South Africa	Ireland	Andy McBrine	c Quinton de Kock	
28	Bikram Sob	7 September 2021	Al Amerat Cricket Stadium (Turf 1), Al Amerat	Nepal	Papua New Guinea	Tony Ura	bowled	
29	Maheesh Theekshana	7 September 2021	R. Premadasa Stadium, Colombo	Sri Lanka	South Africa	Janneman Malan	c Dhananjaya de Silva	
30	Afzal Khan Aayan	14 November 2022	Tribhuvan University International Cricket Ground, Kirtipur	United Arab Emirates	Nepal	Sheikh Aasif	lbw	
31	Tim David	17 September 2023	Wanderers Stadium, Johannesburg	Australia	South Africa	Aiden Markram	c Michael Neser	
32	Charlie Cassell (Note: Cassell took wickets with his first two balls in ODIs)	22 July 2024	Forthill, Dundee	Scotland	Oman	Zeeshan Maqsood	lbw	
33	Sufiyan Muqeem	22 December 2024	Wanderers Stadium, Johannesburg	Pakistan	South Africa	Aiden Markram	c Kamran Ghulam	

As of 22 December 2024. Source: ESPNcricinfo.

== Wicket with first ball in T20I career ==
No	Bowler	Date	Venue	For	Against	Batsman	Dismissal	Ref(s)
1	Michael Kasprowicz (Note: Kasprowicz took wickets with his first two balls in T20Is.)	17 February 2005	Eden Park, Auckland	Australia	New Zealand	Stephen Fleming	bowled	
2	Andre Nel	21 October 2005	New Wanderers Stadium, Johannesburg	South Africa	New Zealand	Nathan Astle	Bowled	
3	Ajit Agarkar	1 December 2006	New Wanderers Stadium, Johannesburg	India	South Africa	Herschelle Gibbs	c Raina	
4	Alfonso Thomas	2 February 2007	New Wanderers Stadium, Johannesburg	South Africa	Pakistan	Imran Nazir	c de Villiers	
5	Shaun Tait	11 December 2007	WACA Ground, Perth	Australia	New Zealand	Jamie How	c Gilchrist	
6	Rory Kleinveldt	5 November 2008	New Wanderers Stadium, Johannesburg	South Africa	Bangladesh	Junaid Siddique	c de Villiers	
7	Brett Geeves	27 March 2009	New Wanderers, Johannesburg	Australia	South Africa	Herschelle Gibbs	c Ponting	
8	Pragyan Ojha	6 June 2009	Trent Bridge, Nottingham	India	Bangladesh	Shakib Al Hasan	c Dhoni	
9	Joe Denly	15 November 2009	SuperSport Park, Centurion	England	South Africa	Graeme Smith	c Sajid Mahmood	
10	Virat Kohli (Note: Kohli's wicket came off his first delivery, which was called a wide.)	31 August 2011	Old Trafford Cricket Ground, Manchester	India	England	Kevin Pietersen	st MS Dhoni	
11	Nadeem Ahmed	16 March 2014	Zahur Ahmed Chowdhury Stadium, Chittagong	Hong Kong	Nepal	Subash Khakurel	c Aizaz Khan	
12	Paras Khadka	16 March 2014	Zahur Ahmed Chowdhury Stadium, Chittagong	Nepal	Hong Kong	Irfan Ahmed	c Subash Khakurel	
13	Willie Gavera	15 July 2015	Civil Service Cricket Club, Stormont, Belfast	Papua New Guinea	Ireland	Niall O'Brien	bowled	
14	Ajay Lalcheta	21 November 2015	Sheikh Zayed Stadium, Abu Dhabi	Oman	Hong Kong	Nizakat Khan	bowled	
15	Aamer Yamin	30 November 2015	Sharjah Cricket Stadium, Sharjah	Pakistan	England	Jason Roy	lbw	
16	Lockie Ferguson	3 January 2017	McLean Park, Napier	New Zealand	Bangladesh	Sabbir Rahman	c Matt Henry	
17	Lakshan Sandakan	22 January 2017	Wanderers Stadium, Johannesburg	Sri Lanka	South Africa	Mangaliso Mosehle	c Chandimal	
18	Taijul Islam	13 September 2019	Sher-e-Bangla National Stadium, Dhaka	Bangladesh	Zimbabwe	Brendan Taylor	c Mahmudullah	
19	Lewis Gregory	3 November 2019	Wellington Regional Stadium, Wellington	England	New Zealand	Colin de Grandhomme	bowled	
20	Khizar Hayat	20 February 2020	Kinrara Academy Oval, Kuala Lumpur	Malaysia	Hong Kong	Kinchit Shah	bowled	
21	Dieter Klein	8 March 2020	Desert Springs Cricket Ground, Almería	Germany	Spain	Awais Ahmed	lbw	
22	Cole McConchie	1 September 2021	Sher-e-Bangla National Cricket Stadium, Mirpur	New Zealand	Bangladesh	Mohammad Naim	c Henry Nicholls	
23	Keshav Maharaj	10 September 2021	R. Premadasa Stadium, Colombo	South Africa	Sri Lanka	Bhanuka Rajapaksa	lbw	
24	Salman Nazar	10 November 2021	Coolidge Cricket Ground	Canada	United States	Aaron Jones	Caught	
25	Ihsanullah	24 March 2023	Sharjah Cricket Stadium, Sharjah	Pakistan	Afghanistan	Ibrahim Zadran	c Azam Khan	
26	Matthew Humphreys	31 March 2023	Zohur Ahmed Chowdhury Stadium	Ireland	Bangladesh	Rishad Hossain	bowled	
27	Aarnav Patel	20 March 2024	Achimota Oval, Accra	Kenya	Ghana	Richmond Baaleri	c Gerard Mwendwa	
28	Sahil Chauhan (Note: Chauhan took wickets with his first two balls in T20Is)	18 June 2024	Happy Valley Ground, Episkopi	Estonia	Cyprus	Mangala Gunasekara	bowled	
28	Ben Fletcher	16 June 2025	Titwood, Glasgow	Netherlands	Nepal	Lokesh Bam	c Scott Edwards	
29	Sher Malla	8 February 2026	Wankhede Stadium, Mumbai	Nepal	England	Phil Salt	c Sandeep Lamichhane	
30	Jayden Lennox	2 May 2026	Sher-e-Bangla National Cricket Stadium, Dhaka	New Zealand	Bangladesh	Saif Hassan	c Tim Robinson	
31	Jai Moondra	26 June 2026	Stormont Cricket Ground, Belfast	Ireland	India	Sanju Samson	bowled	

As of 26 June 2025. Source: ESPNcricinfo.

== Wicket with first ball in women's T20I career ==
No	Bowler	Date	Venue	For	Against	Batsman	Dismissal	Ref(s)
1	Chloe Tryon	5 May 2010	Warner Park, Basseterre	South Africa	West Indies	Stafanie Taylor	c Alicia Smith	
2	Akshatha Rao (Note: Rao took two wickets with her first two balls in WT20Is.)	1 September 2019	Lochlands, Arbroath	United States	Bangladesh	Rahman Ayasha	c Nadia Gruny	
3	Suhani Thadani	18 October 2021	Reforma Athletic Club, Naucalpan	United States	Brazil	Roberta Avery	c Sindhu Sriharsha	
4	Rohmalia Rohmalia	24 April 2024	Udayana Cricket Ground, Bali	Indonesia	Mongolia	Tsendsuren Ariuntsetseg	c I Gusti Pratiwi	
5	Niki Prasad (Note: Prasad took two wickets with her first two balls in WT20Is.)	18 October 2026	Shaheed Veer Narayan Singh International Cricket Stadium, Raipur	India	Zimbabwe	Chipo Mugeri-Tiripano	c †Richa Ghosh	

As of 18 October 2026. Source: ESPNCricInfo.
