= Sadashiv Shinde =

Indian cricketer (1923–1955)

Sadu Shinde
Personal information
- Full name: Sadashiv Ganpatrao Shinde
- Born: 18 August 1923; Bombay, Bombay Presidency, British India
- Died: 22 June 1955 (aged 31); Bombay, Maharashtra, India
- Batting: Right-handed
- Bowling: Legbreak googly

International information
- National side: India
- Test debut (cap 33): 22 June 1946 v England
- Last Test: 19 June 1952 v England

Career statistics
Competition	Test	First-class
Matches	7	79
Runs scored	85	871
Batting average	14.16	14.04
100s/50s	0/0	0/1
Top score	14	50*
Balls bowled	1,515	14,961
Wickets	12	230
Bowling average	59.75	32.59
5 wickets in innings	1	12
10 wickets in match	0	0
Best bowling	6/91	8/162
Catches/stumpings	0/–	16/–
- Source: CricInfo, 20 November 2022

Sadashiv Ganpatrao "Sadu" Shinde (18 August 1923 – 22 June 1955) was an Indian cricketer who played in seven Test matches from 1946 to 1952. His daughter, Pratibha Pawar, is married to politician Sharad Pawar.

== Cricket career ==
A leg-spinner, Shinde was described as "frail and willowy". Apart from the leg break and the conventional googly, Shinde could also bowl a different googly. According to Sujit Mukherjee, "coming after the orthodox wrist-crooked wrong-'un, this delivery invariably sprang a nasty surprise. Ripped off the top of the third finger, it hastened unexpectedly off the pitch. Its tendency to pitch short nullified its efficacy as secret weapon but was practically unplayable when properly pitched."

Shinde's first performance of note in first class cricket was 5 for 186 off 75.5 overs for Maharashtra against Bombay in 1943–44 as Vijay Merchant made 359 not out for Bombay. He toured England with the Indian team in 1946 and took 39 wickets in tour matches. In his only appearance in a Test match on the tour, at Lord's, he was involved in a stand of 43 for the last wicket with Rusi Modi, but did little with the ball. In the next five years, he played in only one more Test.

His one major success in Tests came against England at Delhi in 1951–52. He was brought on to bowl as the third change just before lunch on the first day of the series. Immediately after lunch he bowled Don Kenyon middle stump with a googly, and followed with Jack Robertson lbw and Donald Carr caught by wicket-keeper Nana Joshi off a leg-break. He was 8-2-16-3 at this point. He took three more wickets after tea as England were bowled out for 203 five minutes before close. Shinde's figures were 6/91. India took a handsome first innings lead and had two days to bowl England out in the second innings. But Shinde had seven chances missed off his bowling, most crucially by Joshi and the substitute Dattajirao Gaekwad, and England saved the match. Shinde himself missed a run out.

Shinde found a place in the team to England in 1952 (possibly at the expense of Subhash Gupte). He took 39 wickets in tour matches but the wicket of Peter May in Leeds was to be his last in Tests.

Of those Test cricketers who have had at least ten innings, Shinde is one of only two whose batting averages exceed their highest score. The other is the Pakistani player Antao D'Souza.

Shinde represented Maharashtra, Bombay and Baroda in Ranji Trophy and took 230 wickets in first class matches. His best bowling figures were 8 for 162 for Bombay against Gujarat in the Ranji trophy in 1950–51, when Gujarat nevertheless won by an innings and 166 runs.

Shinde died of typhoid at the age of 32. Shinde is the father-in-law of Sharad Pawar, a politician and former President of BCCI.
