= International cricket in 1941–42 =

International cricket season

The 1941–42 international cricket season was from September 1941 to April 1942. All international tournaments abandoned due to Second World War. The season consisted domestic seasons for Australia, India, South Africa and West Indies.

== See also ==
- Cricket in World War II
