= International cricket in 1940 =

Cricket season

The 1940 international cricket season was abandoned and no international tournaments were held during this season due to initial impact of the Second World War.

== See also ==
- Cricket in World War II
