= International cricket in 1942–43 =

International cricket season

No international cricket was played in the 1942–43 season due to Second World War. Domestic cricket went ahead in India, with the Ranji Trophy being won by Baroda.

== See also ==
- Cricket in World War II
