= International cricket in 1939–40 =

International cricket season

The duration of the 1939–40 international cricket season was to be from September 1939 to April 1940. However, all international tournaments were abandoned due to the impact of the Second World War. The season consisted of domestic seasons for Australia, India and South Africa.

== See also ==
- Cricket in World War II
