= International cricket in 1943 =

International cricket season

The 1943 international cricket season was abandoned due to prevailing Second World War. There were no domestic cricket played in any country.

== See also ==
- Cricket in World War II
