= Arthur Booth (cricketer, born 1902) =

English cricketer

Arthur Booth (3 November 1902 – 17 August 1974) was an English professional first-class cricketer, who played first-class cricket for Yorkshire County Cricket Club. He was an orthodox slow left-arm bowler, and a lower-order right-handed batsman.

== Cricket career ==
Booth was born in Featherstone, Yorkshire, England, and began playing for Yorkshire's Second XI in 1923, and made his first team debut in 1931, but played only twice. From 1935 until World War II he represented Northumberland in the Minor Counties Championship and was selected for the Minor Counties representative side in 1936 and 1938.

After Hedley Verity was killed during the War, Yorkshire lacked a slow left-arm bowler when cricket resumed and Booth was recalled. He played in two first-class matches in 1945 and then became a first-team regular in 1946, the first full post-war season, at the age of 43. Yorkshire won the County Championship that year and, in all matches, Booth took 111 wickets at an average of 11.61. He received his county cap, and was top of the season's national bowling averages.

In 1947, rheumatic fever effectively finished Booth's career and he played only four times for Yorkshire, taking just seven wickets. His place in the first team was contested by the younger Johnny Wardle and Alan Mason. Almost 85 per cent of Booth's 131 career wickets came in the one season of 1946.

Booth's best innings figures came in the match against Warwickshire at Birmingham in 1946, when he took 6 for 21 and 3 for 19 despite having had to retire hurt in Yorkshire's innings. His best match figures came a few weeks later when he took 6 for 33 and 4 for 50 in Yorkshire's innings victory over the touring Indian team; he dismissed the leading Indian Test batsmen Vijay Hazare, Vinoo Mankad and Rusi Modi in each innings.

He was later associated with Warwickshire as a scout, and served on the Lancashire committee until 1970.

Booth died in Rochdale, Lancashire, in August 1974.

== Bibliography ==
- Playfair Cricket Annual – 1948 edition
- Wisden Cricketer's Almanack – 1947 edition
- Wisden Cricketer's Almanack – 1975 edition
