= International cricket in 1942 =

International cricket season

The 1942 International cricket season was from April 1942 to August 1942. There were no major cricket played during this season due to the prevailing Second World War.

== See also ==
- Cricket in World War II
