= Tyrell Johnson =

Tyrell Johnson is the name of:

- Tyrell Johnson (American football) (born 1985), American football player
- Tyrell Johnson (cricketer) (1917–1985), West Indian cricketer
