= International cricket in 1944 =

International cricket season

The 1943–44 international cricket season was abandoned due to the prevailing Second World War. Domestic cricket was not played in any country during the season.

== See also ==
- Cricket in World War II
