= International cricket in 1941 =

International cricket season

The 1942 international cricket season was abandoned because of the Second World War. There was no domestic cricket played in any country.

== See also ==
- Cricket in World War II
