= David Paynter (cricketer) =

English cricketer

Personal information
- Full name: David Edward Paynter
- Born: 25 January 1981 (age 45); Truro, England
- Batting: Right-handed
- Bowling: Right-arm off spin
- Role: Batsman
- Relatives: E Paynter (great-grandfather)

Domestic team information
- Years: Team
- 2001–2003: Northamptonshire
- First-class debut: 3 July 2002 Northamptonshire v Durham
- Last First-class: 4 June 2003 Northamptonshire v Gloucestershire
- List A debut: 27 June 2001 Northamptonshire Cricket Board v Northamptonshire
- Last List A: 6 August 2003 Northamptonshire v Scotland

Career statistics
Competition	FC	LA
Matches	5	4
Runs scored	268	137
Batting average	38.28	45.66
100s/50s	1/1	1/0
Top score	146	104
Balls bowled	36	90
Wickets	0	3
Bowling average	–	43.00
5 wickets in innings	–	0
10 wickets in match	–	0
Best bowling	–	2/56
Catches/stumpings	2/–	0/0
- Source: CricketArchive, 27 January 2010

David Edward Paynter (born 25 January 1981) is an English former cricketer who played as a top-order batsman and part-time bowler for Northamptonshire.

He was born in Truro, Cornwall, and played for the Yorkshire academy and the Worcestershire 2nd XI before joining Northamptonshire. After five first-class matches and four List A matches in three seasons with Northants, Paynter returned to the Worcs 2nd XI, but stopped playing in 2004.

David Paynter is the great-grandson of the England and Lancashire batting legend, Eddie Paynter, famous for performances for the national Test side in the 1930s, including the 1932–1933 Bodyline series in Australia, where he scored a match-winning 83 in one match of the series after being called from the sickbed while he had a fever by his captain, Douglas Jardine.
