= West Indian cricket team in England in 1939 =

International cricket tour

The West Indies cricket team toured England in the 1939 season to play a three-match Test series against England. England won the series 1–0 with two matches drawn. The West Indians played a total of 25 first-class matches, winning eight with six defeats and eleven draws.

The tour was discontinued a few days after the final Test match because of the worsening international situation with the Second World War imminent. All matches scheduled from 26 August to 12 September were cancelled. West Indies did not play Test cricket again until January 1948 when England toured the Caribbean. The 1939 series was also the last played till after the war by England, whose next opponents were India in 1946.

The 1940 edition of Wisden Cricketers' Almanack named Learie Constantine of Barbados as one of its Five Cricketers of the Year along with English players Bill Edrich, Walter Keeton, Brian Sellers, and Doug Wright.

== West Indies players ==
The West Indies toured with a 16-man squad captained by Rolph Grant, with John Cameron as his vice-captain. The manager of the team was John Kidney, who played 11 first-class matches for Barbados between 1909 and 1932; he had previously managed the 1933 touring team in England.

Squad details below state the player's age at the beginning of the tour, his batting hand, his type of bowling, and his team in the Inter-Colonial Tournament (ICT) at the time:

Batters
Name	ICT	Birth date	Batting style	Bowling style	Ref
Peter Bayley	British Guiana	9 April 1916 (aged 23)	right-handed	none	
George Headley	Jamaica	30 May 1909 (aged 29)	right-handed	leg break	
Jeff Stollmeyer	Trinidad & Tobago	11 March 1921 (aged 18)	right-handed	leg break & googly	
Vic Stollmeyer	Trinidad & Tobago	24 January 1916 (aged 23)	right-handed	leg break & googly	
Ken Weekes	Jamaica	24 January 1912 (aged 27)	left-handed	unknown	

All-rounders
Name	ICT	Birth date	Batting style	Bowling style	Ref
Learie Constantine	Barbados	21 January 1901 (aged 38)	right-handed	right-arm fast or medium pace	
Gerry Gomez	Trinidad & Tobago	10 October 1919 (aged 19)	right-handed	right-arm medium pace	
Rolph Grant (captain)	Trinidad & Tobago	15 December 1909 (aged 29)	right-handed	off break	
Foffie Williams	Barbados	10 April 1914 (aged 25)	right-handed	right-arm fast medium	

Wicket-keepers
Name	ICT	Birth date	Batting style	Bowling style	Ref
Ivan Barrow	Jamaica	16 January 1911 (aged 28)	right-handed	none	
Derek Sealy	Barbados	11 September 1912 (aged 26)	right-handed	none	

Bowlers
Name	ICT	Birth date	Batting style	Bowling style	Ref
John Cameron (vice-captain)	(Somerset, England)	8 April 1914 (aged 25)	right-handed	leg break & googly	
Bertie Clarke	Barbados	7 April 1918 (aged 21)	right-handed	leg break & googly	
Leslie Hylton	Jamaica	29 March 1905 (aged 34)	right-handed	right-arm fast	
Tyrell Johnson	Trinidad & Tobago	10 January 1917 (aged 22)	left-handed	left-arm fast	
Manny Martindale	Barbados	25 November 1909 (aged 29)	right-handed	right-arm fast	

Of the 16 players in the squad, Martindale, Barrow, and Headley had toured with the previous West Indies team to visit England in 1933, while Constantine (who had toured England in 1923 and 1928) and Grant had been co-opted to that team for a few matches. Constantine had played in West Indies' first-ever Test on the 1928 tour, and Sealy (the youngest Test player for West Indies) had played in the first Tests in the West Indies, when England toured in 1929–30. Grant and Hylton had made their Test debuts in the 1934–35 series in the West Indies.

Eight of the nine other players in the side made their Test debuts during the 1939 tour. They were Cameron, Clarke, Gomez, Johnson, the Stollmeyer brothers, Weekes and Williams. Only Bayley was not capped on this tour, and he never played Test cricket.

== England selections ==
England in the last two years of peacetime did not have a settled team. They used a total of 31 players in the 1938 home series against Australia, the 1938/39 tour of South Africa, and the 1939 home series against West Indies. Seventeen played in the three Tests against West Indies. Wally Hammond captained the team in the whole series.

Batters
Name	County Championship	Birth date	Batting style	Bowling style	Ref
Denis Compton	Middlesex	23 May 1918 (aged 20)	right-handed	slow left-arm wrist spin	
Arthur Fagg	Kent	18 June 1915 (aged 23)	right-handed	right-arm medium pace	
Harold Gimblett	Somerset	19 October 1914 (aged 24)	right-handed	right-arm medium pace	
Wally Hammond (captain)	Gloucestershire	19 June 1903 (aged 35)	right-handed	right-arm medium-fast	
Joe Hardstaff Jr	Nottinghamshire	3 July 1911 (aged 27)	right-handed	right-arm medium pace	
Len Hutton	Yorkshire	23 June 1916 (aged 22)	right-handed	leg break	
Walter Keeton	Nottinghamshire	30 April 1905 (aged 34)	right-handed	none	
Buddy Oldfield	Lancashire	5 May 1911 (aged 27)	right-handed	unknown	
Eddie Paynter	Lancashire	5 November 1901 (aged 37)	left-handed	right-arm medium pace	

All-rounders
Name	County Championship	Birth date	Batting style	Bowling style	Ref
Stan Nichols	Essex	6 October 1900 (aged 38)	left-handed	right-arm fast	

Wicket-keepers
Name	County Championship	Birth date	Batting style	Bowling style	Ref
Arthur Wood	Yorkshire	25 August 1898 (aged 40)	right-handed	none	

Bowlers
Name	County Championship	Birth date	Batting style	Bowling style	Ref
Bill Bowes	Yorkshire	25 July 1908 (aged 30)	right-handed	right-arm fast medium	
Bill Copson	Derbyshire	27 April 1908 (aged 31)	right-handed	right-arm fast medium	
Tom Goddard	Gloucestershire	1 October 1900 (aged 38)	right-handed	off break	
Reg Perks	Worcestershire	4 October 1911 (aged 27)	left-handed	right-arm fast medium	
Hedley Verity	Yorkshire	18 May 1905 (aged 33)	right-handed	slow left-arm orthodox	
Doug Wright	Kent	21 August 1914 (aged 24)	right-handed	leg break & googly	

== Tour itinerary ==
The West Indians were scheduled to play a total of forty matches on their 1939 tour. The first two, both one-day games of minor status, were abandoned without a ball bowled due to rain. Between 3 May and 22 August, they played 33. Of these, 25 including the three Tests were first-class, and eight were minor matches. After the tour was discontinued in August, five scheduled matches—four first-class and one minor—were left unplayed. On 4 September, the West Indians played an unscheduled ad hoc match in Montréal. In the list, minor matches are in italics.

Date	Match title	Venue	Result
1 May	R. Earle's XI v West Indians	Busbridge Hall, Godalming	Match abandoned (rain)
2 May	Reigate Priory v West Indians	Park Lane, Reigate	Match abandoned (rain)
3 May	L. E. G. Ames' XI v West Indians	Bat and Ball Ground, Gravesend	Match drawn
4 May	Army v West Indians	Officers Club Services Ground, Aldershot	West Indians won by 3 wickets
6–8 May	Worcestershire v West Indians	New Road, Worcester	Worcestershire won by 85 runs
10–12 May	Lancashire v West Indians	Aigburth, Liverpool	Match drawn.
13–16 May	Marylebone Cricket Club v West Indians	Lord's, St John's Wood	Match drawn.
17–19 May	Cambridge University v West Indians	Fenner's, Cambridge	Match drawn.
20–23 May	Surrey v West Indians	The Oval, Kennington	Surrey won by 7 wickets.
24–26 May	Oxford University v West Indians	University Parks, Oxford	West Indians won by an innings and 5 runs.
27–30 May	Glamorgan v West Indians	Cardiff Arms Park, Cardiff	Glamorgan won by 73 runs.
31/5–1/6	Essex v West Indians	County Ground, Chelmsford	West Indians won by 2 wickets.
3–6 June	Middlesex v West Indians	Lord's, St John's Wood	West Indians won by an innings and 228 runs.
7–8 June	Northamptonshire v West Indians	County Ground, Northampton	West Indians won by 9 wickets.
10–13 June	Derbyshire v West Indians	County Ground, Derby	Match drawn.
14–16 June	Minor Counties v West Indians	Lord's, St John's Wood	Match drawn.
17–20 June	Leicestershire v West Indians	Aylestone Road, Leicester	Match drawn.
21–22 June	Lincolnshire v West Indians	Brumby Hall, Scunthorpe	West Indians won by an innings and 60 runs.
24–27 June	England v West Indies (1st Test)	Lord's, St John's Wood	England won by 8 wickets.
28–29 June	Norfolk v West Indians	County Ground, Lakenham	Match drawn.
1–4 July	Nottinghamshire v West Indians	Trent Bridge, Nottingham	West Indians won by an innings and 94 runs.
5–7 July	Yorkshire v West Indians	St George's Road, Harrogate	Match drawn.
8–11 July	Lancashire v West Indians	Old Trafford, Manchester	Match drawn.
12–13 July	Northumberland v West Indians	Osborne Avenue, Jesmond	Match drawn.
15–17 July	Durham v West Indians	Ashbrooke, Sunderland	Match drawn.
19–20 July	Sir Julien Cahn's XI v West Indians	West Park, West Bridgford	Match drawn.
22–25 July	England v West Indies (2nd Test)	Old Trafford, Manchester	Match drawn.
26–28 July	Surrey v West Indians	The Oval, Kennington	West Indians won by 7 wickets.
29/7–1/8	Hampshire v West Indians	Dean Park, Bournemouth	West Indians won by 10 wickets.
2–3 August	Somerset v West Indians	County Ground, Taunton	Somerset won by an innings and 72 runs.
5–7 August	Glamorgan v West Indians	St Helen's, Swansea	West Indians won by 2 wickets.
9–11 August	Warwickshire v West Indians	Edgbaston, Birmingham	Match drawn.
12–15 August	Gloucestershire v West Indians	College Ground, Cheltenham	Gloucestershire won by 7 wickets.
16–17 August	Wiltshire v West Indians	Great Western Railway Ground, Swindon	Match drawn.
19–22 August	England v West Indies (3rd Test)	The Oval, Kennington	Match drawn.
26–29 August	Sussex v West Indians	County Ground, Hove	Cancelled.
30/8–1/9	Kent v West Indians	St Lawrence Ground, Canterbury	Cancelled.
2–3 September	W. E. Butlin's XI v West Indians	Richmond Drive, Skegness	Cancelled.
4 September	Montréal XI v West Indians	Westmount Athletic Ground, Montréal	West Indians won on first innings lead.
6–8 September	England XI v West Indians	Cheriton Road, Folkestone	Cancelled.
9–12 September	H. D. G. Leveson-Gower's XI v West Indians	North Marine Road, Scarborough	Cancelled.

== Test series ==
England and the West Indies played three Tests between June and August. England won the series 1–0 with two matches drawn:

- First Test at Lord's: England won by 8 wickets
- Second Test at Old Trafford: match drawn
- Third Test at The Oval: match drawn

=== 1st Test ===
24–27 June 1939
Scorecard

West Indies	v	England
277 (81.4 overs); George Headley 106; Bill Copson 5/85 (24 overs)		404/5d (95 overs); Len Hutton 196; John Cameron 3/66 (26 overs)
225 (69.4 overs); George Headley 107; Bill Copson 4/67 (16.4 overs)		100/2 (17.7 overs); Eddie Paynter 32*; Leslie Hylton 1/36 (7 overs)

England won by 8 wickets
Lord's, London
Umpires: Tiger Smith and Fanny Walden

- West Indies won the toss and elected to bat.
- 25 June was taken as a rest day
- Jeff Stollmeyer, Ken Weekes, John Cameron and Bertie Clarke (all WIN), and Bill Copson (ENG) made their Test debuts.

George Headley, with 106 in the first innings and 107 in the second, became the first cricketer to make separate hundreds in a Test at Lord's. It was the second time he had achieved this feat against England, having made 114 and 112 at Georgetown in 1929–30. Jeff Stollmeyer, on his Test debut, made 59 out of 147 in West Indies' first innings, and Bill Copson, also making his Test debut, took five for 85. England's reply was based on 196 for Len Hutton. Hutton shared a fourth wicket partnership of 248 with Denis Compton, who made 120. With the whole of the final day to save the match, West Indies looked to be on course at 190 for four, but lost their last six wickets for 35 runs. Copson took four in the innings to finish with match figures of nine for 152. England had 110 minutes to make 99 for victory and did it with 35 minutes to spare.

=== 2nd Test ===
22–25 July 1939
Scorecard

England	v	West Indies
164/7d (55.2 overs); Joe Hardstaff Jr 76; Bertie Clarke 3/59 (13 overs)		133 (35.4 overs); George Headley 51; Bill Bowes 6/33 (17.4 overs)
128/6d (38 overs); Denis Compton 34*; Learie Constantine 4/42 (11 overs)		43/4 (15.6 overs); Derek Sealy 13*; Bill Copson 1/2 (3 overs)

Match drawn
Old Trafford, Manchester
Umpires: Frank Chester and Tiger Smith

- West Indies won the toss and elected to field.
- 23 July was taken as a rest day
- Gerry Gomez and Foffie Williams (both WIN) made their Test debuts.

Rain and bad light ruined the match, with only 35 minutes play possible on the first day. Clarke's leg-spin and Grant's off-spin caused an England collapse to 62 for five, but Joe Hardstaff made 76 out of 111 in 100 minutes. England declared when Hardstaff was out with the thought that the pitch would get more difficult, but Grant made 47 out of 56 with three sixes off Tom Goddard. On the morning of the last day, only Headley, with 51, offered much resistance, Bill Bowes taking six for 33 in 17.4 (eight-ball) overs. England's batsmen failed to take the initiative in the second innings, and the match petered out to a draw. The catch that Wally Hammond took to dismiss Headley in West Indies' second innings was his 100th in Tests: the first player to achieve this apart from wicket-keepers.

=== 3rd Test ===
19–22 August 1939
Scorecard

England	v	West Indies
352 (73.3 overs); Joe Hardstaff Jr 94; Learie Constantine 5/75 (17.3 overs)		498 (101.5 overs); Ken Weekes 137; Reg Perks 5/156 (30.5 overs)
366/3d (76 overs); Len Hutton 165*; Tyrell Johnson 1/76 (14 overs)

Match drawn
The Oval, London
Umpires: Frank Chester and Bill Reeves

- England won the toss and elected to bat.
- 20 August was taken as a rest day
- Buddy Oldfield (ENG), and Vic Stollmeyer and Tyrell Johnson (both WIN) made their Test debuts.

Debutant Johnson took the wicket of Walter Keeton with his first delivery in Test cricket, but Buddy Oldfield made 80 on his first appearance for England, and with Hutton making 73 and Hardstaff 94, England were all out for 352 before the end of the first day. Jeff Stollmeyer and Headley both made 50s for West Indies in a cautious start on the second day, but then Vic Stollmeyer, making his Test debut, and Weekes added 163 in 100 minutes for the fifth wicket. Stollmeyer was out for 96 but Weekes went on to a hundred in 100 minutes and finished with 137. On the final morning, Constantine hit 79 out of 103 from the final 92 balls of the innings. England lost Keeton and Oldfield cheaply in their second innings, but Hutton (165 not out) and Hammond (138) shared a third wicket partnership of 264, then a world Test record, to make the match and the series safe.

== Tour discontinued ==
The third Test was completed on Tuesday, 22 August, the day before the signing of the Molotov–Ribbentrop Pact, which prompted the passage of the Emergency Powers (Defence) Act 1939 by the UK Parliament on 24 August.

Realising the gravity of the international crisis, the West Indian team cancelled their remaining fixtures, including matches against Sussex and Kent. Another of the cancelled matches was against an England XI, scheduled for 6–8 September at Cheriton Road in Folkestone. The England XI team had been announced before the tour was discontinued. It included five players—Wally Hammond (captain), Denis Compton, Arthur Fagg, Tom Goddard, and Doug Wright—who had taken part in the Test series. The other six selections were Les Ames, Gerry Chalk, and Bryan Valentine (all of Kent); Bill Edrich (Middlesex); and the brothers Alf and George Pope (both of Derbyshire).

Apart from Learie Constantine and Manny Martindale, who were Lancashire League professionals living in England, the West Indian party travelled overnight from Euston Station to Greenock on Saturday, 26 August, where they boarded the SS Montrose (1922), bound for Montréal. They arrived on Saturday, 2 September, the day before war was declared.

On Monday, 4 September, the West Indians played a Montréal XI at the Westmount Athletic Ground. Montréal batted first and were all out for 35. The West Indians scored 207 for 8, and Montréal were 64 for 5 at close of play. The match was drawn, but awarded to the West Indians on first innings lead. After that, the tourists made their way back to the Caribbean by various means. The last to arrive home were three Jamaicans—George Headley, Ken Weekes, and Ivan Barrow—who had sailed from New York on the SS Antigua, which reached Kingston on 24 September.

== Bibliography ==
- Wisden (1940). Whitaker, Haddon (ed.). Wisden Cricketers' Almanack (77th ed.). London: Sporting Handbooks Ltd. OCLC 851705816.
