= Bertie Clarke =

West Indian cricketer (1918–1993)

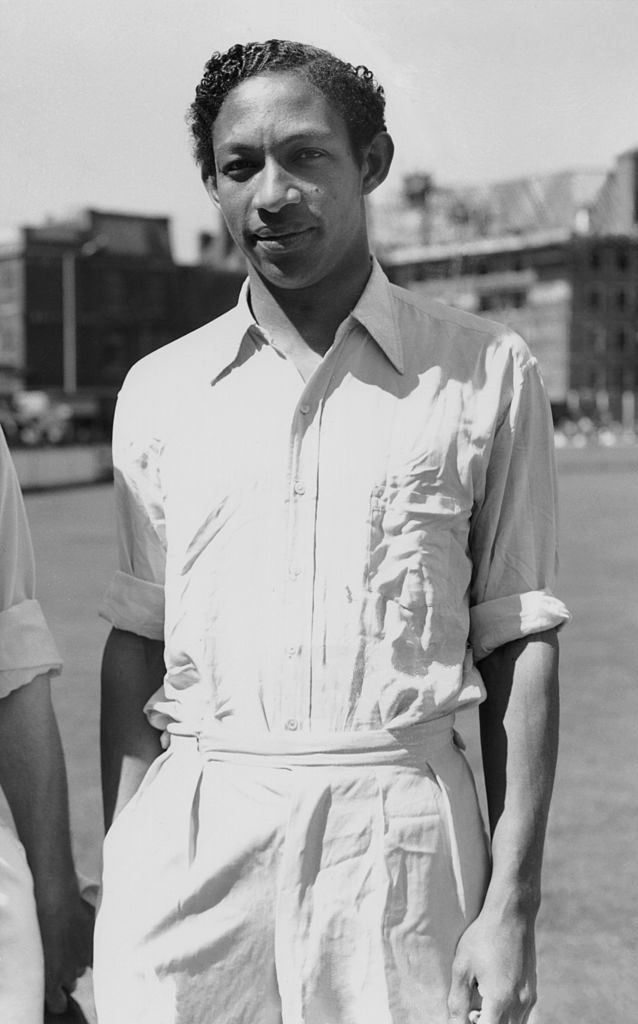
- Clarke in 1947

Personal information
- Born: 7 April 1918; Lakes Folly, Barbados
- Died: 14 October 1993 (aged 75); Putney, London, England
- Batting: Right-handed
- Bowling: Leg break, googly
- Role: Bowler

International information
- National side: West Indies
- Test debut (cap 46): 24 June 1939 v England
- Last Test: 19 August 1939 v England

Domestic team information
- Years: Team
- 1937/38–1938/39: Barbados
- 1946–1949: Northamptonshire
- 1959–1960: Essex

Career statistics
Competition	Test	First-class
Matches	3	97
Runs scored	3	1,292
Batting average	1.00	12.30
100s/50s	0/0	0/1
Top score	2	86
Balls bowled	456	16,123
Wickets	6	333
Bowling average	43.50	26.37
5 wickets in innings	0	20
10 wickets in match	0	1
Best bowling	3/59	7/75
Catches/stumpings	0/–	42/–
- Source: CricketArchive, 1 March 2016

Carlos Bertram Clarke OBE (7 April 1918 – 14 October 1993) was a West Indian international cricketer who played in three Test matches in 1939 as a leg-spin bowler.

Clarke took six wickets in his three Test appearances but the whole 1939 tour brought him 87 wickets at an average of 21.81 including career best figures of 7/75 against Hampshire. He remained in England during the war when three-day cricket was an impossibility due to the demands of labour for the military, Clarke was the leading bowler for the British Empire XI which played one-day matches across the country. He took 98 wickets for 11.48 runs apiece in 1941 and bettered this with 129 for 10.17 apiece in 1942.

After the war, Clarke played frequently though not regularly for Northamptonshire between 1946 and 1949, earning his county cap during the 1947 season which saw him take 83 wickets and make a career high score of 86. He re-appeared in county career for Essex in 1959 and 1960.

Clarke trained as a medical student at Guy's Hospital during the war, qualifying as a doctor in 1944 and setting up a general practice in London four years later. In December 1962, Clarke was sentenced to three years imprisonment after pleading guilty to performing illegal abortions. He was 'struck off' by the General Medical Council the following year but successfully rejoined the Medical Register in 1966. His career as a general practitioner continued until retirement aged 73. He was appointed an OBE in 1983 for his service to the Barbadian community in the UK.

Clarke carried on playing club cricket until he was 70, appearing largely for the BBC with whom he had contributed to the Caribbean Service. Across a 37-year club career he took an estimated 3,000 wickets. According to an admiring Leo Cooper, he returned from prison “the same as ever and continued to weave his spells over a host of club cricketers”.
