= Vic Stollmeyer =

West Indian cricketer

Cricket information
- Batting: Right-handed
- Bowling: Legbreak googly

International information
- National side: West Indies
- Only Test (cap 52): 19 August 1939 v England

Career statistics
Competition	Test	First-class
Matches	1	33
Runs scored	96	2,096
Batting average	96.00	42.77
100s/50s	0/1	4/13
Top score	96	139
Balls bowled	–	993
Wickets	–	15
Bowling average	–	40.79
5 wickets in innings	–	0
10 wickets in match	–	0
Best bowling	0/–	3/38
Catches/stumpings	0/0	16/–
- Source: CricInfo, 20 November 2022

Victor Humphrey Stollmeyer (24 January 1916 – 21 September 1999) was a West Indian cricketer who played in one Test in 1939.

Vic Stollmeyer was the older brother of West Indian captain Jeff Stollmeyer.
