= Indian cricket team in England in 1946 =

International cricket tour

The Indian national cricket team toured England in the 1946 season and played 29 first-class fixtures with 11 wins, 4 defeats and 14 draws. The 1946 season marked a return to normal first-class cricket in England following the end of World War II. The Test series between England and India was the first to be played in England since the West Indies tour in 1939. England won the series 1–0 with two matches drawn, their success largely due to the impact of debutant Alec Bedser who took 22 wickets in his first two Tests.

== Conditions in 1946 ==
The Second World War in Europe having ended in May 1945, it was only possible to arrange eleven first-class matches in the 1945 English cricket season and so 1946, despite postwar recovery and continued rationing, was the first season in which a normal schedule of matches could be established in the County Championship and in Test cricket with the arrival of the Indian tourists.

In its review of the 1946 season, Wisden Cricketers' Almanack remarked that "the Indians were the first postwar touring side, and although they were outplayed in the Tests they raised the status and the dignity of their country's sport". Wisden also mentioned that "the weather in 1946 might have been dreadful, but it didn't stop the crowds flocking to games". The state of the weather was mentioned by John Arlott who wrote his first match report for The Guardian when the Indians played Worcestershire at New Road, Worcester on 4, 6 and 7 May. Arlott wrote that "New Road was bleak that Saturday morning... dark under the cloud, it was swept by a bitter gale howling across from Diglis". In his review of the tour, S. Canynge Caple wrote that the Indian tourists were very popular, their tour returning a sizeable profit, because large crowds turned out when the weather was fine in an otherwise "extremely dreary summer".

Derek Birley commented on the wider and political background to the tour. In January 1946, the Imperial Cricket Conference had drawn up a seven-year programme of Test series with India selected to make the first postwar tour of England. This, Birley remarked, despite the "mounting political crisis at home" and the grave shortage of equipment and clothing "in rationed and straitened Britain". It was the last Indian team before Partition and it presented a united front.

== Indian squad ==
India used a 16-man squad captained by Iftikhar Ali Khan, the Nawab of Pataudi, who was one of the few players to represent two countries in Test cricket, having played for England during the 1930s.

Squad details below state the player's age at the beginning of the tour, his batting hand, his type of bowling, and his Ranji Trophy team at the time:

Batsmen
Name	Ranji Trophy	Birth date	Batting style	Bowling style	Ref
Nawab of Pataudi	unattached	16 March 1910 (aged 36)	right-handed	none	
V. S. Hazare	Baroda	11 March 1915 (aged 31)	right-handed	right arm medium pace	
V. M. Merchant	Bombay	12 October 1911 (aged 34)	right-handed	right arm medium pace	
R. S. Modi	Bombay	11 November 1924 (aged 21)	right-handed	right arm medium pace	
S. Mushtaq Ali	Holkar	17 December 1914 (aged 31)	right-handed	slow left arm orthodox spin	

All-rounders
Name	Ranji Trophy	Birth date	Batting style	Bowling style	Ref
Abdul Hafeez	unattached	17 January 1925 (aged 21)	left-handed	slow left arm orthodox spin	
L. Amarnath	unattached	11 September 1911 (aged 34)	right-handed	right arm medium pace	
Gul Mohammad	Baroda	15 October 1921 (aged 24)	left-handed	left arm medium pace	
M. H. Mankad	Gujarat	12 April 1917 (aged 29)	right-handed	slow left arm orthodox spin	
C. T. Sarwate	Holkar	22 July 1920 (aged 25)	right-handed	off break	

Wicket-keepers
Name	Ranji Trophy	Birth date	Batting style	Bowling style	Ref
D. D. Hindlekar	Bombay	1 January 1909 (aged 37)	right-handed	none	
R. B. Nimbalkar	Baroda	1 December 1915 (aged 30)	right-handed	none	

Bowlers
Name	Ranji Trophy	Birth date	Batting style	Bowling style	Ref
S. N. Banerjee	Bihar	3 October 1911 (aged 34)	right-handed	right arm fast-medium pace	
C. S. Nayudu	Holkar	18 April 1914 (aged 32)	right-handed	leg break and googly	
S. G. Shinde	Maharashtra	18 August 1923 (aged 22)	right-handed	leg break and googly	
S. W. Sohoni	Maharashtra	5 March 1918 (aged 28)	right-handed	right arm fast-medium pace and off break	

The team relied heavily on all-rounders and some of those listed above as batsmen or bowlers had all-round ability. All except Banerjee and Nimbalkar played in the Test series. The team was largely inexperienced at international level as only six players had made their Test debuts before the Second World War: Pataudi, Amarnath, Hindlekar, Merchant, Mushtaq Ali and Nayudu. In the first Test, which India lost heavily, the team had six debutants: Abdul Hafeez, Gul Mohammad, Hazare, Mankad, Modi and Shinde.

== England selections ==
England staged two Test trials, the first in June a week before the First Test and the second in July a week before the Second Test. It was seven years since England had last played a Test match and there was a winter tour of Australia to come so the selectors wanted to look at a large number of players to try and quickly establish the best possible team. A total of 35 players were used in the two Test trials and, in the end, England used 19 players in the three Test matches, with as many as 10 making only a single appearance.

The details for each player below state his age at the beginning of the Indian tour, his batting hand, his type of bowling, and his County Championship club at the time:

Batsmen
Name	County club	Birth date	Batting style	Bowling style	Ref
D. C. S. Compton	Middlesex	23 May 1918 (aged 27)	right-handed	slow left-arm wrist-spin	
W. J. Edrich	Middlesex	26 March 1916 (aged 30)	right-handed	right arm fast-medium pace	
L. B. Fishlock	Surrey	2 January 1907 (aged 39)	left-handed	slow left arm orthodox spin	
W. R. Hammond	Gloucestershire	19 June 1903 (aged 42)	right-handed	right arm fast-medium pace	
J. Hardstaff	Nottinghamshire	3 July 1911 (aged 34)	right-handed	right arm medium pace	
L. Hutton	Yorkshire	23 June 1916 (aged 29)	right-handed	leg break	
C. Washbrook	Lancashire	6 December 1914 (aged 31)	right-handed	right arm medium pace	

All-rounders
Name	County club	Birth date	Batting style	Bowling style	Ref
J. T. Ikin	Lancashire	7 March 1918 (aged 28)	left-handed	leg break and googly	
J. Langridge	Sussex	10 July 1906 (aged 39)	left-handed	slow left arm orthodox spin	
T. F. Smailes	Yorkshire	27 March 1910 (aged 36)	left-handed	right arm medium pace	
T. P. B. Smith	Essex	30 August 1908 (aged 37)	right-handed	leg break and googly	

Wicket-keepers
Name	County club	Birth date	Batting style	Bowling style	Ref
T. G. Evans	Kent	18 August 1920 (aged 25)	right-handed	leg break	
P. A. Gibb	Yorkshire	11 July 1913 (aged 32)	right-handed	none	

Bowlers
Name	County club	Birth date	Batting style	Bowling style	Ref
A. V. Bedser	Surrey	4 July 1918 (aged 27)	right-handed	right arm medium-fast pace	
W. E. Bowes	Yorkshire	25 July 1908 (aged 37)	right-handed	right arm fast-medium pace	
A. R. Gover	Surrey	29 February 1908 (aged 38)	right-handed	right arm fast	
R. Pollard	Lancashire	19 June 1912 (aged 33)	right-handed	right arm fast-medium pace	
W. E. Voce	Nottinghamshire	8 August 1909 (aged 36)	right-handed	left arm fast-medium pace	
D. V. P. Wright	Kent	21 August 1914 (aged 31)	right-handed	leg break and googly	

== Tour itinerary ==
The following is a list of the 33 matches played by the 1946 Indians. 29 including the three Test matches were first-class fixtures. The four minor games are listed in italics.

Date	Match title	Venue	Result
4 May	Worcestershire v Indians	New Road, Worcester	Worcestershire won by 16 runs
8 May	Oxford University v Indians	The Parks, Oxford	Match drawn
11 May	Surrey v Indians	The Oval, London	Indians won by 9 wickets
15 May	Cambridge University v Indians	Fenner's, Cambridge	Indians won by an innings and 19 runs
18 May	Leicestershire v Indians	Grace Road, Leicester	Match drawn
22 May	Scotland v Indians	Myreside, Edinburgh	Indians won by an innings and 56 runs
25 May	Marylebone Cricket Club v Indians	Lord's Cricket Ground, London	Indians won by an innings and 194 runs
29 May	Indian Gymkhana v Indians	Indian Gymkhana Cricket Club Ground, Osterley	Indians won by 4 wickets
1 June	Hampshire v Indians	County Ground, Southampton	Indians won by 6 wickets
8 June	Glamorgan v Indians	Cardiff Arms Park, Cardiff	Match drawn
12 June	Combined Services v Indians	United Services Recreation Ground, Portsmouth	Match drawn
15 June	Nottinghamshire v Indians	Trent Bridge, Nottingham	Match drawn
22 June	England v India (First Test)	Lord's Cricket Ground, London	England won by 10 wickets
26 June	Northamptonshire v Indians	County Cricket Ground, Northampton	Match drawn
29 June	Lancashire v Indians	Aigburth Cricket Ground, Liverpool	Indians won by 8 wickets
3 July	Yorkshire v Indians	Park Avenue, Bradford	Yorkshire won by an innings and 82 runs
6 July	Lancashire v Indians	Old Trafford, Manchester	Match drawn
10 July	Derbyshire v Indians	Queen's Park, Chesterfield	Indians won by 118 runs
13 July	Yorkshire v Indians	Bramall Lane, Sheffield	Match drawn
17 July	Durham v Indians (Note: The match against Durham is not considered first-class as Durham in 1946 was a member of the Minor Counties Championship and did not acquire first-class status until 1992.)	Ashbrooke Sports Ground, Sunderland	Match drawn
20 July	England v India (Second Test)	Old Trafford, Manchester	Match drawn
25 July	Club Cricket Conference v Indians	Woodbridge Road, Guildford	Match drawn
27 July	Sussex v Indians	County Cricket Ground, Hove	Indians won by 9 wickets
31 July	Somerset v Indians	County Ground, Taunton	Somerset won by an innings and 11 runs
3 August	Glamorgan v Indians	St. Helen's Rugby and Cricket Ground, Swansea	Indians won by 5 wickets
7 August	Warwickshire v Indians	Edgbaston, Birmingham	Match drawn
10 August	Gloucestershire v Indians	College Ground, Cheltenham	Match drawn
17 August	England v India (Third Test)	The Oval, London	Match drawn
24 August	Essex v Indians	Southchurch Park, Southend-on-Sea	Indians won by 1 wicket
28 August	Kent v Indians	St Lawrence Ground, Canterbury	Match drawn
31 August	Middlesex v Indians	Lord's Cricket Ground, London	Indians won by an innings and 263 runs
4 September	South v Indians	Central Recreation Ground, Hastings	Indians won by 10 runs
7 September	H. D. G. Leveson-Gower's XI v Indians	North Marine Road Ground, Scarborough	Match drawn

== Test series ==
England and India played three Tests between June and August. England won the series 1–0 with two matches drawn:

- First Test at Lord's: England won by 10 wickets
- Second Test at Old Trafford: match drawn
- Third Test at The Oval: match drawn

=== First Test ===
22–25 June 1946
Scorecard

India	v	England
200 (76.1 overs); Rusi Modi 57; Alec Bedser 7/49 (29.1 overs)		428 (169.4 overs); Joe Hardstaff 205; Lala Amarnath 5/118 (57 overs)
275 (81.1 overs); Vinoo Mankad 63; Alec Bedser 4/96 (32.1 overs)		48/0 (16.5 overs); Cyril Washbrook 24; Vijay Hazare 0/7 (4 overs)

England won by 10 wickets
Lord's Cricket Ground
Umpires: H. G. Baldwin, J. A. Smart

- India won the toss and decided to bat
- 3-day match

Mainstays of the England team who each played in all three Tests were captain Wally Hammond, opening batsmen Len Hutton and Cyril Washbrook, middle order batsman Denis Compton and opening pace bowler Alec Bedser. For the first Test at Lord's, England had only three debutants compared with India's six. Bedser and batting all-rounder Jack Ikin were the only "new" players in that they had made two and five first-class appearances respectively before the war and each of them was now in his first full season. The third debutant was veteran seam bowler Frank Smailes who had been playing regularly for Yorkshire since 1932. England's other four players in this match were experienced pre-war players: batsman Joe Hardstaff junior, wicket-keeper Paul Gibb, leg spinner Doug Wright and pace bowler Bill Bowes.

India's six debutants were Gul Mohammad, Abdul Hafeez, Vijay Hazare, Vinoo Mankad, Rusi Modi and Sadu Shinde. The rest of the team were captain Pataudi, who was making his first appearance for India; Lala Amarnath, Dattaram Hindlekar, Vijay Merchant and C. S. Nayudu.

England won the first Test by a convincing ten wicket margin after Bedser took 11 wickets on debut and Hardstaff scored 205 not out. On each of the first two days the gates were closed about noon, when the crowds numbered nearly 30,000. Around 15,000 were present on the third day, on which the match finished at half past one. India won the toss and batted first but, with heavy rain having fallen, this proved anything but an advantage as the ground was wet throughout the first day to make run-scoring difficult. With the weather improving on the day prior to the start of the Test, the MCC predicted a start in accordance to the scheduled time of 11:30. Wisden says that Bedser maintained an admirable length at fast-medium pace, using swerve or spin to turn the ball appreciably from the sodden turf. Hardstaff's innings was one of great concentration and gave him his highest score in Test cricket after five and a quarter hours batting. He had great support from Gibb in a stand of 182 for the fifth wicket and some useful tailend contributions, especially by Smailes. India began the third day only 66 behind with six wickets in hand but Bedser and Wright caused a collapse which left England needing only 48 to win.

=== Second Test ===
20–23 July 1946
Scorecard

England	v	India
294 (129 overs); Wally Hammond 69; Lala Amarnath 5/96 (51 overs)		170 (82 overs); Vijay Merchant 78; Dick Pollard 5/24 (27 overs)
153/5dec (61 overs); Denis Compton 71; Lala Amarnath 3/71 (30 overs)		152/9 (61 overs); Vijay Hazare 44; Alec Bedser 7/52 (25 overs)

Match drawn
Old Trafford, Manchester
Umpires: G. Beet, F. Chester

- India won the toss and decided to field
- 3-day match

England made team changes for the second Test in view of the need to try out several players ahead of the winter tour of Australia. Pace bowler Dick Pollard was introduced, making his Test debut in place of Smailes. Like Smailes, Pollard was an experienced player active since 1933. Veteran pace bowler Bill Voce was recalled in place of his former bodyline series colleague Bowes. India made three changes with Syed Mushtaq Ali, Chandra Sarwate and Ranga Sohoni coming in for Gul Mohammad, Shinde and Nayudu.

The second Test was drawn but it had a tense climax as India's last wicket pair Sohoni and Hindlekar held on for the final 13 minutes of play to secure the draw with England 125 runs ahead. Bedser again took 11 wickets and Pollard weighed in with 7. Compton, with two half centuries, was the top scorer.

The start of the match was delayed by rain and Pataudi was criticised by Wisden for asking England to bat on a "dead wicket" after he won the toss. England began with an opening stand of 81 between Hutton and Washbrook; they comfortably reached 236 for four at the close on Saturday evening. More rain fell and on Monday morning, India were able to take advantage of wet conditions, bowling England out for 294 with six wickets in an hour, England adding only another 58. India's batsmen were expected to struggle but Merchant and Mushtaq Ali began with a stand of 124, batting well into the afternoon, and then a collapse took place with Pollard enjoying a spell of five overs which realised four wickets for only seven runs and India after their bright start could only manage 160 for seven at the close. The weather relented on the final day and play began on time in bright sunshine, England soon disposing of the remaining Indian wickets. England hoped to score quickly to enable a declaration but Amarnath and Mankad bowled economically and kept the run rate down. Eventually, England declared and left needing India 278 in three hours, a target that "practically vanished" when Merchant was out second ball to Pollard. Bedser had a devastating spell after the tea break, reducing India to 138 for nine with only thirteen minutes left, but Sohoni and Hindlekar managed to hold on for the draw.

=== Third Test ===
17–20 August 1946
Scorecard

India	v	England
331 (127.2 overs); Vijay Merchant 128; Bill Edrich 4/68 (19.2 overs)		95/3 (50 overs); Len Hutton 25; Vinoo Mankad 2/28 (20 overs)

Match drawn
The Oval, Kennington
Umpires: F. Chester, J. A. Smart

- India won the toss and decided to bat
- 3-day match

England made six changes for the third Test, which was drawn after being ruined by rain. Batsmen Laurie Fishlock, Bill Edrich and James Langridge were recalled along with fast bowler Alf Gover. There were two debutants: wicket-keeper Godfrey Evans and Essex spinner Peter Smith who had been the subject of a hoax call-up in 1933. They replaced Ikin, Hardstaff, Gibb, Voce, Pollard and Wright. India made a single change, recalling Nayudu in place of Sarwate.

Play on the first day (a Saturday) could not begin until five o'clock and Wisden commented that it would not have been attempted then "but for the crowds of people who waited around the walls from early in the morning". About 10,000 people watched the evening session in which Merchant and Mushtaq Ali opened for India and scored 79 without loss. The partnership ended with a run out on Monday morning at 94 and India then lost three more wickets to reach 122 for four at lunch. Merchant was run out having scored a "masterful" 128. Edrich, who bowled straight with some off breaks, was the most effective English bowler while Pataudi relied on Amarnath and Mankad. It rained again on the Tuesday and the match was abandoned as a draw at lunchtime.

== Other matches ==
In the Indians' match against Surrey beginning on 11 May, in their first innings a last wicket partnership of 249 between Sarwate and Banerjee took the score from 205/9 to 454 all out. This is still the second highest last wicket partnership in all first-class cricket, the highest in England and the highest partnership between numbers 10 and 11. (The only higher last wicket partnership was between numbers 4 and 11.) Sarwate and Banerjee came together with the score at 205/9 and took just over three hours to add 249 before Banerjee was out for 121, leaving Sarwate not out on 124. It was also the only time in first-class cricket that numbers 10 and 11 both scored a century in the same innings. Nayudu took a hat-trick in the Surrey first innings and Surrey were forced to follow-on. They saved the innings defeat but, with Sarwate taking 5–54 in the second innings, the Indians were left with only 20 needed to win.

== Statistical summary ==
The outstanding batsman for the Indians was Vijay Merchant who scored 2,385 runs on the tour with a highest score of 242* among seven centuries at an average of 74.53. Hazare, Modi and Mankad all exceeded 1,000 runs on the tour while Pataudi was just nineteen shy of it. The Indians scored 21 centuries, Merchant accounting for a third of these. Pataudi had four and Mankad three. India's fielding was generally criticised, mostly for dropped catches, but Mankad with 21 catches was the best fielder. Hindlekar kept wicket in 19 games, holding 22 catches and completing 14 stumpings. His deputy Nimbalkar played in eight games with 12 catches and seven stumpings.

Mankad with 129 wickets was easily the best bowler and he achieved a season "double". Next best were Amarnath and Hazare with 56 wickets apiece. Mankad's seven for 37 was the best innings performance by an Indian bowler.

Vinoo Mankad was elected one of the Wisden Cricketers of the Year in the 1947 Wisden along with England players Bedser, Fishlock, Peter Smith and Washbrook. His colleagues Pataudi and Merchant had won the award in 1932 and 1937 respectively.

== Aftermath ==
India was not involved in international cricket in the 1946–47 season, either as hosts or tourists, and so the 1946 Test series in England was the last played by India before Partition was effected on 14 and 15 August 1947, resulting in formation of the Dominion of India and the Dominion of Pakistan as sovereign states. There were no tours to India in the 1947–48 season and the Indian team went to Australia from October to February, playing a series of five Tests in which they were defeated 4–0.

The 1947–48 team in Australia included seven of the 1946 team: Amarnath (now the captain), Gul Mohammad, Hazare, Mankad, Nayudu, Sarwate and Sohoni. Gul Mohammad later played for Pakistan. His 1946 colleague Abdul Hafeez, who changed his name to Abdul Kardar, became Pakistan's first Test captain in October 1952.

== Bibliography ==
- Arlott, John (1984). David Rayvern Allen (ed.). Arlott on Cricket. Collins.
- Bailey, Philip; Thorn, Philip; Wynne-Thomas, Peter (1984). Who's Who of Cricketers. Guild Publishing.
- Birley, Derek (1999). A Social History of English Cricket. Aurum.
- Caple, S. Canynge (1959). England versus India: 1886 – 1959. Worcester: Littlebury & Co. Ltd. OCLC 451210.
- Guha, Ramachandra (2001). A Corner of a Foreign Field – An Indian History of a British Sport. Picador.
