= 1946 English cricket season =

1946 was the 47th season of County Championship cricket in England. It was the first full season of first-class cricket to be played in England after World War II. It featured a three-match Test series between England and India, which was arranged at short notice. Yorkshire retained the County Championship title, having been the last pre-war champions in 1939. Wisden Cricketers' Almanack (1947 edition), in its review of the 1946 season, remarked that "the weather in 1946 might have been dreadful, but it didn't stop the crowds flocking to games".

== Honours ==
- County Championship – Yorkshire
- Minor Counties Championship – Suffolk
- Wisden – Alec Bedser, Laurie Fishlock, Vinoo Mankad, Peter Smith, Cyril Washbrook

== Test series ==
England managed to arrange a three-match series against India, whose team was captained by former England player Iftikhar Ali Khan, the Nawab of Pataudi and included Vinoo Mankad, Vijay Merchant and future Pakistan captain Abdul Hafeez Kardar. Mankad was named by Wisden as one of its "Five Cricketers of the Year" in the 1947 edition.

England won the First Test thanks to Alec Bedser's 11 wickets on his debut. The Second Test was drawn after India's last two batsmen held out for the final 13 minutes with England well ahead, Bedser again having taken 11 wickets in the match. The Third Test was also drawn after being ruined by persistent rain.

- First Test at Lord's: England won by 10 wickets
- Second Test at Old Trafford: match drawn
- Third Test at The Oval: match drawn

== Leading batsmen – all first-class matches ==
1946 English cricket season – leading batsmen by average
Name	Innings	Runs	Highest	Average	100s
Wally Hammond	26	1783	214	84.90	7
Vijay Merchant	41	2385	242*	74.53	7
Cyril Washbrook	43	2400	182	68.57	9
Denis Compton	45	2403	235	61.61	10
Martin Donnelly	29	1425	142	52.77	6
Micky Walford	10	472	141*	52.44	2

1946 English cricket season – leading batsmen by aggregate
Name	Innings	Runs	Highest	Average	100s
Denis Compton	45	2403	235	61.61	10
Cyril Washbrook	43	2400	182	68.57	9
Vijay Merchant	41	2385	242*	74.53	7
Laurie Fishlock	46	2221	172	50.47	5
Dennis Brookes	48	2191	200	50.95	7
Jack Robertson	58	2114	128	38.43	5

== Leading bowlers – all first-class matches ==
1946 English cricket season – leading bowlers by average
Name	Balls	Maidens	Runs	Wickets	Average
Arthur Booth	5504	423	1289	111	11.61
Johnnie Clay	4874	204	1742	130	13.40
Austin Matthews	4160	215	1329	93	14.29
Ellis Robinson	6830	354	2498	167	14.95
Bill Bowes	3578	203	987	65	15.18

1946 English cricket season – leading bowlers by aggregate
Name	Balls	Maidens	Runs	Wickets	Average
Eric Hollies	9168	433	2871	184	15.60
Tom Goddard	7862	358	3095	177	17.48
Ellis Robinson	6830	354	2498	167	14.95
Jack Walsh	5962	144	3012	148	20.35
Sam Cook	6739	327	2477	133	18.62

== Bibliography ==
- Wisden Cricketers' Almanack 1947
- All-India and Down Under by Richard Knott, Pitch Publishing, 2023.
