= George Robinson (cricketer, born 1873) =

English cricketer

Personal information
- Full name: George Luther Robinson
- Born: 22 February 1873; Ruddington, Nottinghamshire, England
- Died: 23 March 1930 (aged 57); Conisbrough, Yorkshire, England
- Batting: Right-handed
- Bowling: Leg break
- Relatives: Ellis Robinson (nephew)

Domestic team information
- Years: Team
- 1896: Nottinghamshire

Career statistics
Competition	First-class
Matches	5
Runs scored	58
Batting average	8.28
100s/50s	–/–
Top score	17
Balls bowled	45
Wickets	1
Bowling average	24.00
5 wickets in innings	–
10 wickets in match	–
Best bowling	1/14
Catches/stumpings	2/–
- Source: Cricinfo, 5 October 2010

George Luther Robinson (22 February 1873 – 23 March 1930) was an English cricketer. Robinson was a right-handed batsman who bowled leg break. He was born in Ruddington, Nottinghamshire.

Robinson made his first-class debut for Nottinghamshire against Derbyshire in the 1896 County Championship. During the 1896 season, he represented the county in 4 further first-class matches, the last of which came against Sussex. In his 5 first-class matches, he scored 58 runs at a batting average of 8.28, with a high score of 17. In the field he took 2 catches. With the ball he took a single wicket at a bowling average of 24.00, with best figures of 1/14.

He died at Conisbrough, Yorkshire on 23 March 1930.

== Family ==
His nephew Ellis Robinson played first-class cricket for Yorkshire and Somerset.
