= Ken Weekes =

West Indian cricketer

Kenneth Weekes
Personal information
- Full name: Kenneth Hunnell Weekes
- Born: 24 January 1912; Boston, Massachusetts, United States
- Died: 9 February 1998 (aged 86); Brooklyn, New York, United States
- Batting: Left-handed
- Bowling: Left-arm
- Role: Wicket keeper

International information
- National side: West Indies (1939)
- Test debut (cap 48): 24 June 1939 v England
- Last Test: 19 August 1939 v England

Career statistics
Competition	Test	First-class
Matches	2	30
Runs scored	173	1,731
Batting average	57.66	40.25
100s/50s	1/0	4/12
Top score	137	146
Balls bowled	–	1,140
Wickets	–	12
Bowling average	–	38.66
5 wickets in innings	–	0
10 wickets in match	–	0
Best bowling	–	3/84
Catches/stumpings	0/0	21/1
- Source: Cricinfo, 26 April 2017

Kenneth Hunnel Weekes (24 January 1912 – 9 February 1998), better known as Bam Bam Weekes, was a West Indian international cricketer who represented Jamaica (1938–1947/48) and played two Test matches on the West Indies tour of England in 1939.

He was the cousin of renowned batsman Everton Weekes and was the first Test cricketer to be born in the United States. As of 2024, the only other US-born cricketer to have played at that level is the Sri Lankan Jehan Mubarak.

== See also ==
- List of Test cricketers born in non-Test playing nations
