= John Bridger =

English cricketer (1920–1986)

Personal information
- Full name: John Richard Bridger
- Born: 8 April 1920; Dulwich, Surrey, England
- Died: 14 July 1986 (aged 66); Burley, Hampshire, England
- Batting: Right-handed
- Bowling: Leg break

Domestic team information
- Years: Team
- 1946: Marylebone Cricket Club
- 1946–1954: Hampshire

Career statistics
Competition	First-class
Matches	40
Runs scored	1,883
Batting average	28.96
100s/50s	2/11
Top score	142
Balls bowled	67
Wickets	0
Bowling average	–
5 wickets in innings	–
10 wickets in match	–
Best bowling	–
Catches/stumpings	30/–
- Source: Cricinfo, 10 January 2010

John Richard Bridger (8 April 1920 – 14 July 1986) was an English cricketer, clergyman and educator.

== Life and cricket career ==
Bridger was born at Dulwich in April 1920. He was educated at Rugby School, where he played for and captained the school cricket team. In one match in which he was captain against Marlborough, he scored 153 runs in three hours, took figures of 5 for 54, and held four catches in the Marlborough first innings. From there, he matriculated to Clare College, Cambridge. As a theology student, he was exempt from military service during the Second World War. He was a member of the Cambridge University Cricket Club during his studies, but owing to the suspension of first-class cricket during the war, none of the matches he played for Cambridge were rated as first-class and blues were not awarded; this was despite Bridger opening the batting in three University Matches against Oxford University, which had been curtailed to one-day matches. He made his debut in first-class cricket for an Under-33 cricket team against an Over-33 cricket team at Lord's in September 1945, scoring 49 runs in the Under-33 first innings. Following season, he made a first-class appearance for the Marylebone Cricket Club (MCC) against Cambridge University, where he scored his maiden half century, making 94 runs.

Soon after his appearance for the MCC, he made his debut as an amateur for Hampshire against Sussex at Bournemouth in the 1946 County Championship, making a half century on debut. In his second match for Hampshire, against Middlesex, he scored his maiden first-class century with a score of 142, sharing in a partnership of 179 for the second wicket with Gerry Hill. These matches were his only appearances for Hampshire in 1946, with Wisden commenting that "in the two matches he took part he showed himself a player of class". He played first-class cricket for Hampshire until 1954, making 38 appearances, occasionally captaining the county; as a schoolmaster, his appearances tended to coincide with the summer holidays. In these, he scored 1,725 an average of 27.82, with a highest score of 142. He made two centuries and ten fifties. He had a reputation as an excellent fielder, taking 29 catches. He was presented with his county cap by Hampshire captain Desmond Eagar, who lauded his services to Hampshire cricket following the war. In club cricket, Bridger played for Dulwich Cricket Club, taking over 1,500 wickets for the club.

Following his graduation from Cambridge, he undertook holy orders and was a school chaplain, alongside his schoolmaster duties. In 1954 Bridger wrote an article for The Churchman titled "The Public School Chaplain's Job". In 1958 he became warden of Tyndale House, a biblical studies centre in Cambridge. Bridger died following a car accident on 14 July 1986 at Burley, Hampshire. His vehicle had been involved in a collision with another, and despite the efforts of emergency services to free him from the wreckage, he died at the scene.
