= Tyrell Johnson (cricketer) =

West Indian cricketer

Personal information
- Full name: Tyrell Fabian Johnson
- Born: 10 January 1917; Tunapuna, Trinidad
- Died: 5 April 1985 (aged 68); Couva, Trinidad
- Batting: Left-handed
- Bowling: Left-arm fast-medium

International information
- National side: West Indies
- Only Test (cap 51): 19 August 1939 v England

Domestic team information
- Years: Team
- 1935/36–1938/39: Trinidad

Career statistics
Competition	Test	FC
Matches	1	18
Runs scored	9	90
Batting average	–	9.00
100s/50s	0/0	0/0
Top score	9*	27
Balls bowled	240	2,846
Wickets	3	50
Bowling average	43.00	21.50
5 wickets in innings	0	1
10 wickets in match	0	0
Best bowling	2/53	6/41
Catches/stumpings	1/–	8/–
- Source: Cricinfo, 12 August 2022

Tyrell Fabian Johnson (10 January 1917 – 5 April 1985) was a West Indian international cricketer who played in one Test match in 1939.

Tall and thin, Johnson was a left-arm fast-medium bowler. He played for Trinidad in three consecutive finals of the Inter-Colonial Tournament in the late 1930s. He was picked for the 1939 West Indies cricket tour to England after taking six wickets for 41 runs in a trial match in February 1939 and leading the West Indian first-class bowling figures for the season with 22 wickets at an average of 9.59.

In England in 1939, Johnson took a wicket with his first ball of the tour at Worcester, but was picked for only eight other first-class matches. That included, however, the third Test of the three-match series at The Oval, where he repeated his instant success by taking the wicket of Walter Keeton with his first delivery. He took two further wickets in the match (Len Hutton and Norman Oldfield), but managed only 16 on the tour as a whole, at an average of 32 runs per wicket.

This single Test match was Johnson's last first-class cricket appearance. He worked in Trinidad as a customs officer.
