= 1939 County Championship =

English cricket tournament

- Cricket format: First-class cricket
- Tournament format(s): League system
- Champions: Yorkshire (21st title)

The 1939 County Championship was the 46th officially organised running of the County Championship. Yorkshire County Cricket Club won their 21st Championship.

The Championship was the last for six years due to World War II and during the 1939 Championship three matches were not played due to the outbreak of the war, they were abandoned on the third day.

== Table ==
- 12 pts for a win
- 6 pts for a tie
- 4 pts for a first innings lead in a match either drawn or lost
- 8 pts for a win in a match under one day rules

County Championship table
Team	Pld	W	L	D	T	1st Inns Loss	1st Inns Draw	Pts	Average
Yorkshire	28	20	4	4	0	2	3	260	9.28
Middlesex	22	14	6	2	0	3	1	180	8.18
Gloucestershire	26	15	7	4	0	1	3	196	7.53
Essex	24	12	10	2	0	4	2	170*	7.08
Kent	26	14	9	3	0	2	1	180	6.92
Lancashire	21	10	6	5	0	3	2	140	6.66
Worcestershire	27	11	10	5	1	2	4	162	6.00
Surrey	24	11	7	6	0	0	2	140	5.83
Derbyshire	25	10	8	7	0	1	5	144	5.76
Sussex	29	10	12	7	0	1	4	140	4.82
Warwickshire	22	7	8	7	0	1	2	98*	4.45
Nottinghamshire	23	6	8	9	0	2	5	100	4.34
Glamorgan	24	6	8	10	0	1	5	96	4.00
Somerset	27	6	11	9	1	2	4	102	3.77
Hampshire	26	3	17	6	0	8	4	84	3.23
Northamptonshire	22	1	12	9	0	3	3	36	1.63
Leicestershire	20	1	14	5	0	1	0	16	0.80

- Includes 2 points for a tie on first innings in match lost
