= London Counties cricket team =

London Counties
Team information
- Founded: 1940

The London Counties cricket team was a team that was formed during the Second World War by Charles Jones.

After the outbreak of war, the government issued an order "closing all places of entertainment and outdoor sports meetings". However, this was soon rescinded and there was instead an emphasis placed on "business as usual" through the war and sports began to resume with a limited schedule.

The County Championship was cancelled, but county sides continued to play occasional matches against each other and other teams. Charles Jones formed London Counties, a side that played at a variety of venues in London, including at Lord's. The team played its first recorded game, a two-day match against a Northamptonshire XI, on 18 May 1940, winning by 128 runs.

The team relied primarily on established professionals based in the south of England, and gained a reputation for being a team of "hitters and known fast scorers". During the war years, London Counties formed a friendly rivalry with the British Empire XI, a similar team. Both teams worked for war charities.

== See also ==
- 1940 to 1944 English cricket seasons

== Bibliography ==
- Nick Hayes and Jeff Hill, Millions Like Us – British Culture in the Second World War, Liverpool University Press, 1999
