= Len Parslow =

English cricketer

Personal information
- Full name: Leonard Frederick Parslow
- Born: 11 November 1909; Islington, London, England
- Died: 6 August 1963 (aged 53); Rochford, Essex, England
- Batting: Right-handed

Domestic team information
- Years: Team
- 1946: Essex

Career statistics
Competition	First-class
Matches	1
Runs scored	9
Batting average	4.50
100s/50s	–/–
Top score	5
Balls bowled	–
Wickets	–
Bowling average	–
5 wickets in innings	–
10 wickets in match	–
Best bowling	–
Catches/stumpings	–/–
- Source: Cricinfo, 9 October 2011

Leonard Frederick Parslow (11 November 1909 – 6 August 1963) was an English cricketer. Parslow was a right-handed batsman. He was born at Islington, London.

Parslow made his only first-class appearance for Essex against Somerset in the 1946 County Championship. He batted at number ten in the Essex first-innings, scoring 5 runs before he was dismissed by Johnny Lawrence. In their second-innings he was promoted up the order to open the batting, scoring 4 runs before being dismissed by Bill Andrews.

He died at Rochford, Essex on 6 August 1963.
