= Ellis Robinson (cricketer) =

English cricketer

Personal information
- Full name: Ellis Pembroke Robinson
- Born: 10 August 1911; Denaby Main, Yorkshire, England
- Died: 10 November 1998 (aged 87); Conisbrough, Yorkshire, England
- Batting: Left-handed
- Bowling: Right-arm off break
- Relatives: George Robinson (uncle)

Domestic team information
- Years: Team
- 1950–1952: Somerset
- 1934–1949: Yorkshire

Career statistics
Competition	First-class
Matches	301
Runs scored	3,492
Batting average	11.01
100s/50s	–/8
Top score	75*
Balls bowled	56,048
Wickets	1,009
Bowling average	22.58
5 wickets in innings	61
10 wickets in match	12
Best bowling	1/14
Catches/stumpings	265/–
- Source: Cricinfo, 5 October 2010

Ellis Pembroke Robinson (10 August 1911 – 10 November 1998) was an English first-class cricketer who took over 1,000 first-class wickets for Yorkshire from 1934 to 1949, and Somerset from 1950 to 1952.

== Early life ==
Robinson was born in Denaby Main, Conisbrough, near Doncaster, Yorkshire. His Christian names, Ellis Pembroke, derived from his mother, a cockney housemaid who worked for a Cambridgeshire family called Ellis Merry who was a college servant at Pembroke College. "My mum had played cricket on Parker's Piece, where Jack Hobbs had played, and I can't remember when I didn't play the game," he told Nigel Pullan in an interview in 1996.

Robinson learned his cricket at his Denaby club and was sent to Bramall Lane, Sheffield, for George Hirst to assess. He began as a promising wicket-keeper batsman but – "There was no room to keep wicket so, anxious to impress Mr Hirst, I bowled a few quick leg-breaks and googlies." He was invited to the famous "winter shed" at Headingley and told, in true Yorkshire fashion, to forget the leg breaks and concentrate on off spin. Yorkshire had Hedley Verity to spin the ball away from the bat and needed an off spinner as variation as the great George Macaulay was coming to the end of his career.

== Yorkshire ==
Robinson made his Yorkshire debut at Worcester in 1934 against Worcestershire, taking 4–31 and watching the 18-year-old Len Hutton score 196, his first century. He did not establish himself in the strong Yorkshire team until 1937 when he took 78 wickets at an average of 22.55. He snared 104 wickets in 1940 and 120 in the last season before the war and spent six years in the R.A.F. during the war.

He was given a Test trial in 1946 when he took 149 wickets and believed he should have been included in Wally Hammond's doomed team to Australia that following winter: "I turned the ball more than most off-spinners and I think I would have been effective in Australia." The Australians rated him too, Ian Johnson, Australia's premier off-spinner, sought Robinson's advice when touring England in 1948.

As a batsman, following a strong order, Robinson's normal brief was to score quickly. He lifted Claude Lewis, the Kent left-arm spinner and later county scorer, over the roof of the football stand at Headingley, put Dick Howorth of Worcestershire out of Park Avenue, Bradford and into Horton Park, and Johnnie Clay of Glamorgan out of the Arms Park in Cardiff.

He usually fielded at first slip and was as sharp a catcher as any in the county game, taking 265 catches in all. He usually had the dour Arthur Mitchell alongside him at second slip, a partnership that produced a story that will live with Robinson's memory. Before a packed crowd at Headingley, he took a one-handed catch that involved a leap, a dive and ended with a double somersault. As Robinson struggled to his feet, grinning and holding the ball high to acknowledge the cheers of the crowd, Mitchell – "grim as a piece of stone from Baildon Moor" according to Herbert Sutcliffe – muttered from the side of his mouth: "Gerrup. Tha's makkin' an exhibition o' thissen."

Robinson spent most of his playing career under the tough captaincy of Brian Sellers, who won six championships in eight seasons. "I got a rollicking in my first match for putting my foot on the ball. In my first season, my spinning finger was so worn it was bleeding but Mr Sellers said I had to keep going and bowled me into the wind all day." In that match, at Bristol, Robinson took 2–168 as Hammond stroked 143. "You were only paid if you played and I was never sure of my place. As an uncapped player I got pounds 7 or pounds 8 a match but had to pay my own travel and hotel expenses."

== Somerset and later life ==
After the 1949 season, with Ray Illingworth emerging, Robinson was released to spend three summers with Somerset, for whom he played wearing his fading old white rose cap. He remained an effective bowler to the end, taking 102 wickets in 1951.

In 301 first-class matches in all he took 1009 wickets at just 22.58 with a best of 8 for 35 against Lancashire in the Roses Match. He also took 8 wickets in an innings against Surrey and Sussex. He took 5 wickets in an innings 61 times and 12 wickets in a match on 12 occasions. Batting left-handed, he scored 3,492 runs at 11.01 with a highest score of 75* for Yorkshire against Gloucestershire.

Despite taking over a thousand first-class wickets Robinson was never selected for England though he spun the ball and extracted bounce on most surfaces. He bowled most of his overs from around the wicket, angling the ball across the right-hander and spinning it sharply back in. Like so many cricketers, he lost his best years to the Second World War.

After retiring from the first-class game he returned to Yorkshire and resumed his links with the Denaby club for whom he had first played as a youngster. He was belatedly honoured by Yorkshire by being made an Honorary Life Member in 1982. He died suddenly on 10 November 1998 at his home in Conisbrough, while he was dressing to play golf. He was 87 years old and the last surviving player from Yorkshire's all-conquering side of the 1930s.

== Family ==
His uncle George Robinson played first-class cricket for Nottinghamshire.
