= Walter Keeton =

English cricketer (1905–1980)

Personal information
- Full name: William Walter Keeton
- Born: 30 April 1905; Shirebrook, Derbyshire, England
- Died: 10 October 1980 (aged 75); Forest Town, Mansfield, Nottinghamshire, England
- Batting: Right-handed
- Bowling: –
- Role: Batsman

International information
- National side: England
- Test debut (cap 276): 20 July 1934 v Australia
- Last Test: 22 August 1939 v West Indies

Domestic team information
- Years: Team
- 1926–52: Nottinghamshire

Career statistics
Competition	Test	First-class
Matches	2	397
Runs scored	57	24276
Batting average	14.25	39.53
100s/50s	–/–	54/119
Top score	25	312*
Balls bowled	–	164
Wickets	–	2
Bowling average	–	51.50
5 wickets in innings	–	–
10 wickets in match	–	–
Best bowling	–	2/16
Catches/stumpings	–/–	76/–
- Source: CricketArchive, 1 November 2013

Walter Keeton
Personal information
- Position: Inside forward

Youth career
- 1921–1922: Mansfield Colliery Boys Brigade

Senior career*
Years	Team	Apps	(Gls)
1922–1923	Mansfield Shoe Company		
1923–1924	Watford	0	(0)
1924–1925	Notts County	0	(0)
1925–1926	Mansfield Colliery		
1926–1930	Grantham		
1930–1932	Sunderland	12	(1)
1932	Nottingham Forest	5	(0)
1932–1933	Loughborough Corinthians		
1933–193?	Grantham		
- * Club domestic league appearances and goals

William Walter Keeton (30 April 1905 – 10 October 1980) was an English cricketer who played in two Tests in 1934 and 1939. He was a Wisden Cricketer of the Year in 1940 and played first-class cricket as a right-handed opening batsman between 1926 and 1952 for Nottinghamshire. Keeton scored a century against every other first-class county and his 312 not out made in just under eight hours against Middlesex at the Oval in 1939 is still a record for the Nottinghamshire team.

He also played professional association football for Nottingham Forest and Sunderland, for the latter as an inside forward.

== Family and background ==
Keeton was born at Shirebrook, a mining community south-east of Chesterfield in Derbyshire. His parents were William and Mary Ann and both they and Keeton's older sister Doris were born at Eckington, another mining village to the north-east of Chesterfield; by the time of the 1911 census, the family was settled at Forest Town, a mining community in Mansfield, Nottinghamshire, where Keeton's father was employed as a stallman in a mine. Keeton remained in the Mansfield area all of his life and died at Forest Town. He married Florence E. Russell in the Mansfield registration district in 1929.

== Early cricket career ==
Keeton made his debut for Nottinghamshire's second eleven in 1925 and the following year made his first-team debut, playing in two County Championship matches as a lower middle-order batsman. The Nottinghamshire side of the late 1920s was a settled and successful unit under the captaincy of Arthur Carr, with apparently ageless batsmen such as George Gunn, Wilfred Payton and the slightly younger William Whysall, Willis Walker and Carr himself dominating the batting line-up. Keeton and other young batsmen such as Charles Harris and George Gunn junior were given few first-team opportunities, and Keeton played in just five games in 1928 and two in the Championship-winning season of 1929 – one of those two was against Oxford University – and none at all in both 1927 and 1930.

During the 1930 season, Nottinghamshire announced that it would no longer regularly select Gunn, who was 51 at the time, and Payton, who was 48, after the end of the season in order to open up places in the side for younger batsmen; when Whysall, a "stripling" of 43, died unexpectedly following a fall in November 1930, the county decided not to reverse the policy, and accordingly in the 1931 season new players came into the team, among them Keeton. (In practice, the policy was modified and Gunn played fairly regularly in 1931 and 1932, and Payton was also recalled for a few matches in 1931.) Promoted to open the innings (often alongside Gunn), Keeton responded with an unbeaten century in the game against Essex in June 1931 and thereafter was a regular in that position for the rest of the season. By the end of his first full season of first-class cricket he had amassed 1233 runs at an average of 30.07.

That first full season was just the prelude to highly prolific run-getting by Keeton in the next three years, in which he passed 2,000 first-class runs in each season. In the 1932 season, he scored seven centuries. They included an unbeaten 200 against Cambridge University, the first double-century of his career, which proved to be 85 more runs than the Cambridge side made in their two innings combined. Later in the same year he improved on that highest score with an innings of 242 against Glamorgan, made in 330 minutes with three sixes and 27 fours. By the end of the season, Gunn having been injured and then retiring, Keeton had been joined by Harris as his regular opening partner, and the partnership continued up to the Second World War and, on occasion, after it. That Keeton may have been in the minds of the England Test team selectors was shown by the fact that he was picked for a North v South match, a Test trial England v The Rest game that was almost entirely washed out by rain, and the Folkestone edition of the Gentlemen v Players series in 1932, though he was not conspicuously successful in any of these games.

By the end of the 1933 season, according to Wisden Cricketers' Almanack, Keeton had "firmly established himself as the best batsman in the team". The Wisden report went on: "To those who followed the team he recalled memories of the County's greatest batsmen. Though scarcely comparable in method to the giants of the past because of the changed type of most bowlers met in these days, Keeton developed the highest art in defence and run-getting. Possessed of all the strokes, he was especially strong in such attractive features in a batsman's make-up as cutting and off-driving... Keeton, if slow to mature, found himself at the age of 28 in his third full season with the County, mentioned with William Gunn, George Gunn and Arthur Shrewsbury." He scored more than 1000 runs in August 1933 alone, with six centuries in the month, including four in five innings. But again his representative cricket was confined to a few end-of-season matches of doubtful seriousness.

== Test cricketer ==
Keeton was again Nottinghamshire's leading batsman in 1934, averaging more than 43 runs an innings, and his three centuries in the season included two double-centuries. Against Gloucestershire in June he scored 261, his highest score to that point, from a weak attack in which all players except the wicketkeeper bowled. Less than a month later he made 223 against Worcestershire. When a few days later Herbert Sutcliffe was forced through injury to stand down from the England team to play the Australians in the fourth Ashes Test at Leeds, Keeton was drafted in as his replacement for his Test debut. It was not a good Test match for England: outplayed in all departments over four days, they saved the match through the intervention, when they were 165 runs behind with just four second-innings wickets remaining, of a thunderstorm which flooded the pitch, making further play impossible. No England batsman reached 50 in either innings, and Keeton, with scores of 25 and 12, like all his batting colleagues, got into double figures twice but not much further; by contrast, Bill Ponsford scored 181 and Don Bradman 304 for the Australians. Sutcliffe was recovered by the time of the fifth Test and resumed his place in the team at Keeton's expense.

This setback was followed another in the early days of 1935: Keeton was knocked down and seriously injured by a lorry near his home in Mansfield in January, fracturing his ribs and suffering concussion. He was in hospital for three weeks and his doctors were reporting as saying that he was unlikely to be fit for cricket until the end of the 1935 season. In the event, he returned to the Nottinghamshire side in late June, played for less than two months and then stood down from playing again in mid-August; unsurprisingly, his aggregate and average fell significantly.

Keeton returned to fitness in time for the 1936 season and if this was not one of his more outstanding seasons, in that his average was in the mid-30s and his highest score was only 115, he still scored more runs than anyone else for Nottinghamshire. He repeated that in 1937 when his average rose to 45 and his aggregate passed 2000 runs for the season again, though for Nottinghamshire he and the other batsmen were overshadowed by the brilliance of Joe Hardstaff junior who averaged 66 runs per innings in county games. Among highlights for Keeton in 1937 was a series of innings in which he scored three centuries, plus other scores of 99 not out and 97, in the course of eight matches. He was not, however, called in for any of the Test matches against the New Zealand side when the England selectors blooded several new players.

The 1938 season was the least productive of Keeton's first-class career: he made 1512 runs at an average of 29.07, the only time his batting average dipped below 30 in a full season of cricket. Wisden noted that "after an indifferent start Keeton went through other spells of mediocrity", but added that he had been "perhaps not in the best of health judging by the necessity of an operation for appendicitis in October". But he returned to health and form in 1939 with an average for the first time over 50: 1765 runs at 51.91. The runs included the Nottinghamshire record score of 312 not out, which was made at The Oval against Middlesex because Lord's, the usual Middlesex home ground, was required by its owner, the MCC, for the Eton v Harrow match. The innings lasted seven hours and a quarter and included 28 fours and a five, and Keeton was missed four times in the course of it. Keeton's form across the season led to his recall for a second Test match: the final game of a three-match series with the West Indies. In a game of high scoring, he was not successful, being out without scoring in the first innings and making only 20 in the second; it was the last Test match played before the Second World War and was also the end of Keeton's limited Test career. But after his most successful season so far, Keeton was named in the 1940 edition of Wisden as one its Cricketers of the Year.

== Postwar cricket ==
Keeton played several good-standard matches during the Second World War, including appearing for a team representing the National Police in 1943. He was available for Nottinghamshire from the resumption of English first-class cricket in 1946 and his form seemed merely to carry on from its pre-war excellence. In 1946, he was one of only seven English batsmen to pass 2000 runs in the season, with 2021 at an average of 43.93, including five centuries. The aggregate was lower in the run-glut sun-filled summer of 1947, but he maintained his average, and though both aggregate and average were down in 1948, he still scored more runs than any other Nottinghamshire batsman. Against the 1948 Australians, Keeton was hit over the heart by a ball from fast bowler Ray Lindwall and had to be helped from the pitch; a precautionary X-ray revealed that the ribs damaged in the 1935 lorry accident had not been broken again, though Keeton did not resume his innings and missed the next two county matches.

In 1949, at the age of 44, Keeton enjoyed what was, in terms of his average, his best season of all: he made 2049 runs at an average of 55.37, with six centuries, including the last double-century of his career. This was an innings of 210 against Yorkshire made in 405 minutes and he shared a first-wicket partnership of 174 with Reg Simpson and a third-wicket stand of 260 with Hardstaff. Keeton "showed no sign of the advancing years", Wisden reported. But the very next season he missed early games through illness and later matches through a broken finger, and failed to complete 1000 runs in a season for only the second time since he became a full-time first-team player. There was a further decline in average in 1951, when he scored 922 runs at an average of 30.73, but there was also a final century, an innings of 142 when he shared an opening partnership of 269 with Simpson in the match against Kent. Nottinghamshire having finished at the bottom of the County Championship for the first time ever in 1951, the county decided in 1952 to play younger cricketers; Keeton appeared in only one further match, unsuccessfully, and retired after topping the averages for the second eleven in the Minor Counties Championship.

== Cricket style ==
Both right-handed opening batsmen, Keeton and Harris shared more than 40 century partnerships and emerged from their years of opening the Nottinghamshire batting together with similar aggregate and average records. But they had very dissimilar styles and temperaments. Writing of Harris, the journalist and cricketer R. C. Robertson-Glasgow wrote: "Harris is a dreamer. He is a strange addition to Walter Keeton as they walk out to open an innings; Keeton strung up, concentrated, quick-glancing; Harris serenely distrait, revolving idealistic strokes against an attack that will not occur; lagging sometimes a pace or two behind, like a boy with parent on an unwilling Sunday walk." Where Harris was seen as "enigmatic", likely to block a full toss or to fashion an on-drive off an unplayable delivery, Keeton was consistent and reliable, though his range of strokes was very wide. Almost all of Keeton's best batting was done within the confines of the County Championship for Nottinghamshire: all of his 54 centuries were for the county, and all but one (the 200 not out against Cambridge University) were in Championship matches. For Nottinghamshire, his batting average was a shade over 40; his comparative lack of success in his few other matches brought his career average back to 39.53.

In addition to his batting, Keeton was also highly rated as an outfielder, often at third man; he was not a bowler at all, and took only two wickets in his entire career, both of them in the last throes of a tame draw at Horsham in 1934.

== After cricket ==
In retirement, Keeton ran a sports shop and was in clerical work with the National Coal Board. He died in 1980 at the age of 75.
