= Rusi Modi =

Indian cricketer (1924–1996)

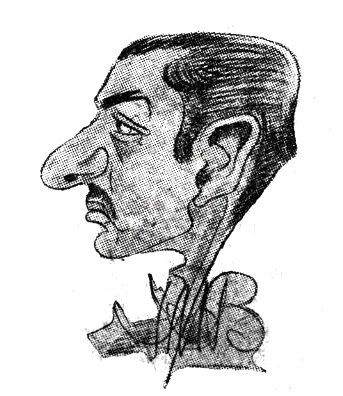

Personal information
- Full name: Rusitomji Sheriyar Modi
- Born: 11 November 1924; Bombay, Bombay Presidency, British India
- Died: 17 May 1996 (aged 71); Bombay, Maharashtra, India
- Batting: Right-handed
- Bowling: Right-arm medium

International information
- National side: India
- Test debut (cap 31): 22 June 1946 v England
- Last Test: 13 November 1952 v Pakistan

Career statistics
Competition	Test	First-class
Matches	10	105
Runs scored	736	7,529
Batting average	46.00	53.02
100s/50s	1/6	20/39
Top score	112	245*
Balls bowled	30	2,423
Wickets	–	32
Bowling average	–	38.31
5 wickets in innings	–	1
10 wickets in match	–	0
Best bowling	–	5/21
Catches/stumpings	3/–	29/–
- Source: CricketArchive, 3 September 2022

Rustomji Sheriyar Modi (11 November 1924 – 17 May 1996) was an Indian cricketer who played for the India national cricket team from 1946 to 1952.

Modi belonged to Parsi community. His test career started at Lord's in India's first test in England in their tour of England in 1946. He made his debut in a three-day match (22–25 June 1946), which is best recognised for Sir Alec Bedser's eleven-wicket haul on debut. Incidentally, this test also marked the test debuts of Vijay Hazare and Vinoo Mankad, who would go on to be recognised players for India.

Rusi Modi was evidently an accumulator of runs, this fact being evident from his test average of 46 and a first-class average of 53, which also weighed a lot on paper when seen alongside his 20 centuries in the latter respect. He also bowled some medium-pace and even grabbed a five-wicket haul, his only one in all formats of cricket he played in.

== First-class career ==
Modi started his first class career with a century on debut at the age of 17 in a Bombay Pentangular match. In Ranji Trophy between 1943/44 and 1944/45, he scored five hundreds in successive innings for Bombay, seven in successive matches. The sequence read 168 v Maharashtra, 128 v Western India both in 1943/44, 160 v Sind, 210 v Western India, 245* & 31 v Baroda, 113 v Northern India and 98 & 151 v Holkar all in 1944/45. His aggregate of 1008 in only five Ranji matches in 1944/45 was a record which stood for over forty years. He made 1375 runs in all first class matches. Modi was only 20 at the time.

Apart from the two double hundreds in Ranji, Modi scored a 215 for Parsees in the 1944/45 season. The next he hit 203 against Australian Services XI, the first double hundred for India in representative matches. Modi considered it the finest of all his innings. Modi represented Bombay in the Ranji Trophy, where he enjoyed success, scoring 2196 runs at an average of 81.69.

== Test career ==
In the wet summer 1946, when India toured England, Modi was somewhat a veteran in the domestic circuit, having made his debut five years earlier and was selected in the Indian team on the back of some impressive performances like scoring 1008 runs at an excellent average of 201 in the 1944–45 Ranji Trophy season, becoming the first ever player to do so, until W.V. Raman passed that mark, scoring 1018 runs, 44 years later. Modi had already earned a reputation for being a heavy run-maker, as his exploits with the bat made up for impressive watching: centuries in seven consecutive Ranji matches for Bombay in the seasons of 1943–44 and 1944–45, three double-centuries in 1944–45 (the same season when he amassed over a thousand runs), and a fourth the following year against the Australian Services team.

Thus, it was not a real surprise when Modi was selected in the team. When the match started, India found themselves in dire straits as their scorecard read 44–3, when Modi walked in. He immediately flashed at leg spinner Doug Wright, but was dropped by Wally Hammond. Thereafter, he played well to score 57*. As recounted by Vijay Hazare in the book 'A long Innings', "Modi nonchalantly gave a thumbs up to the Indian dressing room (after the drop), and proceeded to play some delightful strokes".

Modi enjoyed moderate success in the three-match series, scoring 137 runs from 5 innings at an average of 34.25, but was the fifth-highest run-scorer in the series, behind Vijay Merchant, Joe Hardstaff Jr, Denis Compton, and Cyril Washbrook. However, he performed better overall, scoring 1196 runs in the tour at an average of 37.37.

In the West Indies tour of India in 1948–49, Modi performed excellently, scoring 560 in five Tests with a hundred and five fifties. The 112 he scored against the West Indies in the Brabourne Stadium was his only Test century, and it came in his fifth Test, and in the second match of the series. Modi was consistent throughout the whole series, scoring excess of 90 thrice in a match. His 112 in Bombay saw him forge an important partnership with Vijay Hazare, the most important of them being 139, when India chased 361 in the final Test. He was involved in four century stands with Hazare in the whole series.

Thereafter his career was affected by his professional commitments. He played for Bombay till 1957/58 and captained the side against Maharashtra in one match in 1952/53. In ten unofficial Tests, he made 565 runs at an average of 35.31.

== Personality ==
John Arlott described Modi in 1946 as "tall, painfully thin, grey of face and huddled into an overcoat, tending to tremble", while noting the difference between the Modi on the field and off it. Six feet tall and very thin, he was quick on his feet and his cover drive "was a stroke of exquisite timing and flawless beauty". He was a better player of spin than pace.

== Trivia ==
Modi was good at table tennis and represented Maharashtra in inter-state matches. He took part in intercollegiate tennis and badminton tournaments. Modi wrote several books starting with Cricket Forever in 1964.

He served as the ADC to the Bombay Governor Raja Maharaja Singh and later became a highly placed executive in the Associated Cement Company. He died of a cardiac arrest which caused him to fall from the balcony of the Cricket Club of India pavilion at the Brabourne Stadium.
