= Jack Robertson (English cricketer) =

English cricketer (1917–1996)

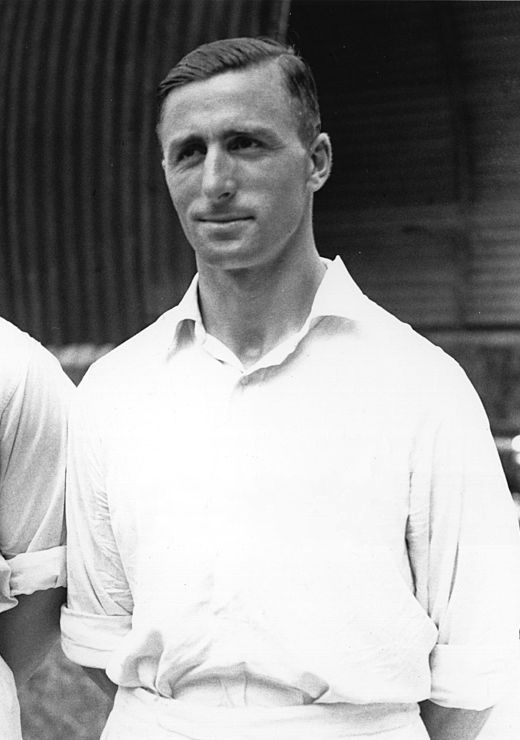
- Robertson in 1946

Personal information
- Full name: John David Benbow Robertson
- Born: 22 February 1917; Chiswick, London, England
- Died: 12 October 1996 (aged 79); Bury St Edmunds, Suffolk, England
- Batting: Right-handed
- Bowling: Right-arm offbreak

International information
- National side: England
- Test debut: 16 August 1947 v South Africa
- Last Test: 6 February 1952 v India

Career statistics
Competition	Test	First-class
Matches	11	509
Runs scored	881	31,914
Batting average	46.36	37.50
100s/50s	2/6	67/161
Top score	133	331*
Balls bowled	138	5,685
Wickets	2	73
Bowling average	29.00	34.73
5 wickets in innings	0	0
10 wickets in match	0	0
Best bowling	2/17	4/37
Catches/stumpings	6/–	352/–
- Source: CricInfo, 6 November 2022

John David Benbow Robertson (22 February 1917 – 12 October 1996) was an English cricketer, who played county cricket for Middlesex, and in 11 Test matches for England.

A right-handed opening batsman of consistency and class, Jack Robertson was a heavy scorer in county cricket who averaged 46 runs per innings in Tests. Yet he played only eleven times for England, was dropped after making a century in 1949, and was never selected to face Australia.

Born in Chiswick, London, England, it was Robertson's misfortune to be overshadowed by others, both in his international and county cricket career. He came to prominence in wartime cricket for the Army when he scored 102 in July 1942 against the Royal Navy. For the first half dozen years of cricket after World War II, England's preferred opening partnership was the trans-Pennine combination of Leonard Hutton and Cyril Washbrook; Robertson's selection for the first Test of 1949 against New Zealand was the result of injury to Washbrook and, despite scoring 121 and sharing a partnership of 143 with Hutton, he lost his place.

For Middlesex, Robertson often seemed similarly overshadowed by the batting of Denis Compton and Bill Edrich. Yet in the summer of 1947, when Compton's 3,816 runs and Edrich's 3,539 set new records for run-getting, Robertson was not far behind, making 2,760 runs with 12 centuries. He surpassed that in 1951 with 2,917 runs, the highest aggregate of any batsman that season. He could also bat as entertainingly as his better-known county colleagues. In 1949, he made an undefeated 331 in a day against Worcestershire at New Road, Worcester, an innings that remains the highest scored in first-class cricket by a Middlesex batsman, and the highest first-class innings by any batsman at New Road.

Robertson passed 1,000 runs in a season every year from 1946 until 1958 but, failing to find any form in 1959, he retired and became county coach.

He was one of the five Wisden Cricketers of the Year in 1948.

He died in October 1996, in Bury St Edmunds after years of ill-health, at the age of 79, and leaving a widow, Joyce, and a son.
