= Cricket in World War II =

Cricket in World War II was severely disrupted in most of the countries where first-class cricket was being played at the time. Only in India was a normal schedule of matches maintained throughout. In Australia, England, New Zealand, South Africa and West Indies the normal first-class competitions were suspended for some or all of the war and a small number of ad hoc first-class matches were organised when possible.

== Australia ==
Although Australia declared war on Germany immediately after the British declaration on 3 September 1939, there was a view prevalent in the country that favoured “business as usual” and the Australian Cricket Board (ACB) was urged by the Prime Minister, Robert Menzies, to comply with this and stage the 1939–40 Sheffield Shield competition "for the morale of the people". In 1940–41, however, the Sheffield Shield was not contested but ten first-class “friendly” matches were played between the States for patriotic funds; however financially these were unsuccessful.

During the 1941 off-season, as the war position worsened, there were already proposals by the New South Wales Cricket Association to end inter-state cricket whilst the war was in progress; however at the beginning of the 1941–42 season Queensland beat New South Wales by nineteen runs in the first of seven scheduled three-day interstate matches.

=== Abandonment of first-class cricket in Australia ===
The march of the Imperial Japanese Navy and Air Force into New Guinea and the northern Australian coastline during the summer of 1941–42, however, meant that an intensification of Australia's war effort was urgently needed and first-class cricket – where matches required four or more days to complete – was incompatible with requirements to mobilise all available labour for the military. Between 9 and 11 December 1941 the state cricket associations of South Australia, Victoria, Queensland and New South Wales decided at meetings with new Prime Minister John Curtin to abandon all interstate matches for the duration of the war.

Two weeks later, the Curtin government, along with various State governments, passed laws that entirely banned sport on weekdays, which naturally put three- or four-day cricket completely out of the question. Consequently, no first-class cricket was played in Australia in 1942–43, 1943–44 or 1944–45. The MCG was also commandeered by the services until the 1946–47 season, so that senior games in Victoria (and several first-class games in 1945–46) were held at Princes Park, Carlton. With the lifting of weekday sport bans after the Pacific War ended in 1945, first-class cricket in Australia resumed on 23 November at the Gabba between Queensland and New South Wales, though the Sheffield Shield was not awarded until 1946–47.

=== Wartime cricket in Australia ===
Prohibitions on weekday sport did not encompass cricket on Christmas Day and New Year's Day, and consequently during the three seasons devoid of first-class cricket in Australia the main events became two-day matches on these public holidays and the nearest Saturday. These began on a limited scale in 1942–43, but were established between Services and state elevens in 1943–44. Numerous famous first-class players took part in these matches, including veteran bowling champion Grimmett and future batting star Neil Harvey. In 1944–45, after the suggestion of two-day interstate cricket at Christmas was rejected during November, these games were played again over the Christmas and New Year period with some future stars including Ray Lindwall and Colin McCool.

== England ==
=== End of the 1939 season ===
The initial impact of the Second World War on English cricket was the premature conclusion of the West Indian tour in the immediate aftermath of the Molotov–Ribbentrop Pact which was signed on Wednesday, 23 August. England and West Indies had just concluded a three-match Test series and West Indies were next due to play Sussex at the County Cricket Ground, Hove, a three-day match starting on Saturday, 26 August. In view of the international crisis, this match and four remaining ones were cancelled and the West Indies team immediately returned home.

The season was almost over when war was declared on Sunday, 3 September and only ten first-class matches were cancelled. Four were due to begin on Saturday, 2 September but all were delayed due to the emergency and then cancelled after the declaration of war. Four remaining games, including Gentlemen v Players, were due to begin on different days during the following week and all were cancelled. The final matches played before the war were six County Championship games that began on Wednesday, 30 August and were completed on or before Friday, 1 September, the day the Wehrmacht invaded Poland. Three of these games were completed with a result on the second day. Two more were ended as draws by agreement on the Friday morning after news of the invasion was reported. The last match to be completed was Sussex v Yorkshire at Hove. From an overnight position of 330/3 in the first innings, chasing a Sussex score of 387, Yorkshire continued on the Friday morning and totalled 392 all out. Sussex collapsed in their second innings and were all out for only 33, whereupon Yorkshire made 30–1 to win by nine wickets. That ended the 1939 season and also marked the end of first-class cricket in England until the first of the Victory Tests began on 19 May 1945.

The few remaining county matches were cancelled immediately and Derek Birley commented that there was "none of the unfortunate disposition to linger over it as in 1914". Cricket in 1939 accepted the inevitable, summarised in the September 1939 issue of The Cricketer by Sir Home Gordon who found a suitable metaphor: "England has now begun the grim Test match against Germany".

The Third Test against West Indies was the last match played at The Oval in 1939. Soon after war was declared, the ground was requisitioned and modified for use as a prisoner-of-war camp, but no prisoners were ever held there. Lord's Cricket Ground was prepared for a similar fate but the authorities decided against it and Lord's was able to stage many games throughout the war to raise money for charity. H. S. Altham wrote in 1940 about a visit to Lord's in December 1939 as "a sobering experience; there were sandbags everywhere and the Long Room was stripped bare with its treasures safely stored below ground". Having painted a bleak picture thus far, Altham ended on a note of defiance: "but the turf was a wondrous green, Old Father Time on the Grand Stand roof was gazing serenely at the nearest (barrage) balloon and one felt that somehow it would take more than totalitarian war to put an end to cricket".

In the 1940 edition of Wisden Cricketers' Almanack, author R. C. Robertson-Glasgow reviewed the 1939 season and remarked that it was "like peeping through the wrong end of a telescope at a very small but happy world".

=== Cancellation of the 1939–40 England tour of India ===
Although German intentions were clear throughout the summer of 1939, the Marylebone Cricket Club (MCC) selectors went ahead with choosing a team of available players for the scheduled tour of India in the autumn and winter of 1939–40. The tour was cancelled as soon as war broke out and many of the chosen players lost their only chance of representing England in Test cricket. The team would have been managed by Claude Rubie and captained by Jack Holmes of Sussex.

Claude Rubie was an Indian Army major who had seen long service in India and had played for the Europeans in the Bombay Quadrangular between 1919 and 1926. He had then taken part in the MCC tour of India in 1926–27 before returning to England and representing Sussex in four matches in 1930. Caple gave the view that Rubie had a "vast and profound knowledge of Indian cricket". However, Rubie died on 3 November 1939.

Jack Holmes played for Sussex from 1922 to 1939, assuming the captaincy in 1936. He was nominally still club captain when the war ended in 1945, although he had decided to retire by then. He was a flight lieutenant in the Royal Air Force (RAF) and had played in first-class matches for the Royal Air Force cricket team between 1930 and 1932. Caple commented on his nickname "Sherlock" and his major contribution to Sussex during his captaincy.

Squad details below state the player's age on 1 September 1939, his batting hand, his type of bowling, and his County Championship club at the time:

Batsmen
Name	Club	Birth date	Batting style	Bowling style	Ref
A. J. Holmes	Sussex	30 June 1899 (aged 40)	right-handed	none	
H. T. Bartlett	Sussex	7 October 1914 (aged 24)	left-handed	none	
H. E. Dollery	Warwickshire	14 October 1914 (aged 24)	right-handed	none	
H. Gimblett	Somerset	19 October 1914 (aged 24)	right-handed	right arm medium pace	
R. H. C. Human	Worcestershire	11 May 1909 (aged 30)	right-handed	right arm medium pace	
J. G. Langridge	Sussex	10 February 1910 (aged 29)	right-handed	right arm medium pace	
R. E. S. Wyatt	Warwickshire	2 May 1901 (aged 38)	right-handed	right arm medium pace	

All-rounders
Name	Club	Birth date	Batting style	Bowling style	Ref
D. E. Davies	Glamorgan	27 June 1904 (aged 35)	left-handed	slow left arm orthodox spin	
M. S. Nichols	Essex	6 October 1900 (aged 38)	left-handed	right arm fast	
J. F. Parker	Surrey	23 April 1913 (aged 26)	right-handed	right arm medium pace	

Wicketkeepers
Name	Club	Birth date	Batting style	Bowling style	Ref
S. C. Griffith	Sussex	16 June 1914 (aged 25)	right-handed	none	
G. S. Mobey	Surrey	5 March 1904 (aged 35)	right-handed	none	

Bowlers
Name	Club	Birth date	Batting style	Bowling style	Ref
G. H. Pope	Derbyshire	27 January 1911 (aged 28)	right-handed	right arm fast-medium pace	
T. P. B. Smith	Essex	30 August 1908 (aged 31)	right-handed	leg break and googly	
A. W. Wellard	Somerset	8 April 1902 (aged 37)	right-handed	off break and right arm fast-medium pace	

=== Wartime charity and inter-services cricket ===
With The Oval and many other venues unusable during the war, Lord's Cricket Ground acquired a special status and Marylebone Cricket Club (MCC) took on great responsibility to set up a meaningful programme of matches each season and so, as Pelham Warner put it, "(enable) cricket to provide a healthy and restful antidote to war strain". Warner played a major role in organising cricket during the war as, with other MCC staff joining the services, he took on the Secretary's duties under the title of "Deputy Assistant Secretary". His first priority was to work with the Royal Air Force (RAF) who occupied most of the Lord's estate including the practice ground and all buildings. The playing area was unaffected and the pavilion and the stands were always available for cricket; Warner paid tribute to the RAF authorities for their considerable help in enabling him to organise matches. Numerous ad hoc clubs and teams were formed, mostly based on the services. Until 1945, the majority of matches were one-day only, owing to time constraints imposed by the needs of the services, with a single innings each, but they were not limited overs and so the result could be a draw.

The two best-known wartime teams were the British Empire XI, Warner's own concept; and the London Counties XI which was founded by the politician Desmond Donnelly, then in the RAF. Despite its name, the British Empire XI featured mainly English county players, although West Indian Test player Bertie Clarke was its mainstay. These teams were first established in 1940 and played one-day charity matches, mostly in the south-east and often at Lord's. Although the teams were successful in raising money for charity, their main purpose was to help sustain morale.

There never was any real hope of staging a County Championship, even on a limited basis, although Lancashire did propose a regionalised competition to include the minor counties. The idea was that home-based servicemen and those in reserved occupations would play when time allowed, but it was not realistic and MCC declined to take it forward. This was in early 1940, during the so-called "Phoney War" but Lancashire's Old Trafford was subsequently bombed and the club effectively closed for the duration, directing all members' subscriptions into a war relief fund. Other county clubs closed at the outset and appealed to the members to keep paying their subscriptions as a future investment. This policy had varying success with Yorkshire declaring an increased surplus and Worcestershire, for example, only a slight improvement while Leicestershire needed funds granted by Sir Julien Cahn to keep going.

One of the main risks in staging matches was bombing and Lord's was hit by bombs in 1941, as reported in the 1942 Wisden, but fortunately without casualties and the damage was not serious. The best known instance of bombing at Lord's occurred during a July 1944 match between the Army and the RAF, which was temporarily interrupted when a V-1 flying bomb landed nearby. The players threw themselves to the ground and then carried on playing after the explosion. On resumption, Jack Robertson defiantly hit the next delivery for six. Wisden in 1945 had two photographs of the incident under the caption "Flying bomb stops play".

=== Victory Tests ===
The Australian and New Zealand Services teams played in England in 1945, including a series of "Victory Tests" between England and Australia.

== India ==
Alone among the Test cricket nations, India managed to stage an almost normal schedule of first-class matches. The Ranji Trophy was contested in every season through the war and the Bombay Pentangular in all except the 1942–43 season.

The scheduled 1939–40 tour of India by England was cancelled but many British servicemen were stationed in India during the war and took part at times in Indian domestic cricket, including the likes of Denis Compton, Joe Hardstaff junior and Reg Simpson.

== New Zealand ==
New Zealand declared war on Germany in the aftermath of the British declaration and, as in Australia, initially decided on a policy of "business as usual" to uphold public morale. This included continuation of the Plunket Shield in the 1939–40 season but it was cancelled for the duration before the 1940–41 season. Inter-service matches were staged during the war when possible and some of these had first-class status. Towards the end of the war, an increasing number of inter-provincial matches were held ahead of the Plunket Shield being restored in 1945–46.

== South Africa ==
The Currie Cup was cancelled for the duration of the war and only a limited number of first-class matches were organised.

== West Indies ==
The West Indian team that toured England in 1939 left the country in late August when it became clear that the outbreak of war was imminent. On Tuesday, 22 August, they had just drawn against England at The Oval to complete the third of a three-match Test series. Their next scheduled match, against Sussex at Hove was due to commence on Saturday, 26 August, but was cancelled along with four remaining matches due to be played up to Tuesday, 12 September.

The domestic Inter-Colonial Tournament was cancelled before the 1939–40 season and was in fact never revived after the war, although the first-class teams continued to play each other when possible. It was not until the launch of the Shell Shield in 1965–66 that a formal domestic competition was again held in the West Indies. During World War II, a small number of first-class matches were organised each season on an ad hoc basis.

== Rest of the World ==
A limited amount of cricket was played in other countries. For example, a match in Canada between teams representing Montreal and Ottawa was held in September 1943.

== Cricketers on active service ==
Hedley Verity, Ken Farnes and others were killed during the war.

Denis Compton, Joe Hardstaff junior and Reg Simpson were stationed in India during the war and took part in domestic cricket there. Keith Miller and Bill Edrich were pilots based in England. Bill Bowes was a prisoner-of-war from 1942 to 1945.

== Bibliography ==
- Birley, Derek (1999). A Social History of English Cricket. London: Aurum Press. ISBN 978-18-54107-10-7 – via Internet Archive.
- Caple, S. Canynge (1959). England versus India: 1886–1959. Worcester: Littlebury & Co. Ltd. OCLC 451210.
- Harte, Chris (1993). A History of Australian Cricket. London: André Deutsch. ISBN 978-02-33988-25-2.
- Warner, Pelham (1946). Lords: 1787–1945. London: Harrap. OCLC 877106024.
- Wright, Graeme, ed. (2005). Wisden at Lord's. Alton, Hampshire: John Wisden & Co. Ltd. ISBN 978-09-47766-93-1.
