= New Zealand cricket team in Australia in 1925–26 =

International cricket tour

The New Zealand cricket team toured Australia from early December 1925 to mid-January 1926, playing four first-class matches against state teams and five other matches.

== The team ==
The selectors were hampered by the unavailability of many players. Four leading players (David Collins, Herb McGirr, James Shepherd and Nessie Snedden) had announced that they were unavailable, four (Stewie Dempster, George Dickinson, Syd Hiddleston and Richard Rowntree) withdrew from the subsequently selected team, and two (John Banks and Matt Henderson) of their replacements also withdrew. Fourteen players toured:

- Billy Patrick (captain)
- Cyril Allcott
- Arthur Alloo
- Roger Blunt
- Cyril Crawford
- Bill Cunningham
- Ces Dacre
- Hector Gillespie
- Raymond Hope
- Ken James
- Tom Lowry
- Dan McBeath
- Charlie Oliver
- Rupert Worker

The team was managed by Frank Peake, the secretary of the New Zealand Cricket Council.

== The tour ==
The New Zealanders lost their first first-class match, against Queensland, by an innings, 227 and 94 to 413 for seven declared.

After easy victories over teams from Goulburn and Wagga Wagga, they drew their game against Victoria. They scored 314 (Allcott scoring 107) and 231 for six, against Victoria’s 592 for seven.

They thrashed a team from Ballarat before playing South Australia. South Australia scored 351 and 293 for five declared, and the New Zealanders made 339 (Lowry made 123, reaching his century in 81 minutes) and 192 for seven.

In the next match, New South Wales made 531 and 205 for 3, the New Zealanders 455 (Patrick made 143 and Allcott 116, putting on 244 for the seventh wicket after the New Zealanders were 162 for six). The last two country matches, in Newcastle and Maitland, were drawn.

Allcott scored the most first-class runs, with 298 at an average of 59.60. Cunningham took most wickets, 13 at 48.84; no bowler averaged less than 46.

Only six of the team (Allcott, Blunt, Cunningham, Dacre, James and Lowry) toured England in 1927.

== Other source ==
- Don Neely & Richard Payne, Men in White: The History of New Zealand International Cricket, 1894–1985, Moa, Auckland, 1986, pp. 69–73.
