= New Zealand cricket team in England in 1937 =

International cricket tour

The New Zealand cricket team toured England in the 1937 season. The team was the third from New Zealand to tour England, following those of 1927 and 1931, and the second to play Test matches. Three Tests were arranged: England won the second match at Manchester, and the games at Lord's and The Oval were drawn, the latter affected by rain. On the tour as a whole, the New Zealanders played 32 first-class matches, winning nine and losing nine, with 14 ending as draws.

== Background ==
After a flurry of activity from 1929–30 to 1932–33, in which New Zealand played its first 11 Test matches – nine against England, two against South Africa – more than four years passed with no Test cricket. The 1936-37 MCC team to Australia did not play Tests on its brief visit to New Zealand, unlike the 1932-33 side.

That 1936–37 series in Australia had proved a fairly chastening experience for England, who won the first two Tests but lost the final three, and so failed to regain The Ashes. The England selectors used the 1937 Test series against New Zealand as an opportunity to try out new players: Len Hutton and Denis Compton were among those who made their Test debuts in the series.

== The 1937 New Zealand team ==
The 1937 side was captained by Curly Page, who was the sole remaining player from the team that toured England in 1927. The manager was Tom Lowry, captain of both the 1927 and 1931 sides, and he played in several matches, largely acting as deputy wicketkeeper, a role he had taken on both the previous tours, though he also scored a century against Nottinghamshire.

The full side was:

- Curly Page (captain)
- Giff Vivian (vice-captain)
- Bill Carson
- Jack Cowie
- Martin Donnelly
- Jack Dunning
- Norman Gallichan
- Walter Hadlee
- Jack Kerr
- Jack Lamason
- Denis Moloney
- Albert Roberts
- Eric Tindill, wicketkeeper
- Merv Wallace
- Lindsay Weir

Page, Vivian, Kerr and Weir were the only survivors from the 1931 tour; Hadlee, Wallace, Cowie and Donnelly were members of the next touring party to England, in 1949. Of the 15 regular players (without Lowry), 13 played in the Tests. The exceptions were Carson and Lamason, neither of whom played Test cricket. Page, Carson and Tindill are credited as three of only seven "double All Blacks", playing both cricket and rugby for New Zealand's national sides. Of the seven, Tindill is the only one to have played Tests in both sports, Page played only cricket Tests, and Carson played Tests in neither.

== Test series ==
Three Test matches were played, and England won the only match of the series to come to a definite result.

=== 1st Test ===
26–29 June 1937
Scorecard

England	v	New Zealand
424 (155.3 overs); WR Hammond 140; AW Roberts 4/101 (43.3 overs)		295 (111.2 overs); AW Roberts 66*; RWV Robins 3/58 (21 overs)
226/4d (42 overs); CJ Barnett 83*; J Cowie 2/49 (15 overs)		175/8 (76.5 overs); WM Wallace 56; W Voce 3/41 (18.5 overs)

Match drawn
Lord's, London
Umpires: F Chester and FI Walden

- England won the toss and elected to bat.
- 27 June was taken as a rest day
- JH Parks and L Hutton (both ENG), and WA Hadlee, WM Wallace, MP Donnelly, DAR Moloney, EWT Tindill and J Cowie (all NZL) made their Test debuts.

England's debutant openers, Len Hutton and Jim Parks senior, did not last long, but Joe Hardstaff junior and Wally Hammond then hit centuries and shared a third wicket partnership of 245. But only Eddie Paynter of the other batsmen made runs. New Zealand lost wickets regularly, with Kerr and Hadlee making 30s and Wallace reaching 52. But at 176 for seven wickets, the follow-on looked likely. Then an eighth wicket partnership of 104 between Moloney, who made 64 and Roberts, unbeaten on 66, came to the rescue. The new openers failed again in England's second innings, but Hardstaff made 64 and Charles Barnett an undefeated 83 to set up the declaration. Resolute batting by Wallace, with 56, and Kerr, who was injured and came in at No 7, saved the match for New Zealand.

=== 2nd Test ===
24–27 July 1937
Scorecard

England	v	New Zealand
358/9d (129 overs); L Hutton 100; J Cowie 4/73 (32 overs)		281 (107.4 overs); WA Hadlee 93; AW Wellard 4/81 (30 overs)
187 (60.5 overs); FR Brown 57; J Cowie 6/67 (23.5 overs)		134 (53.4 overs); HG Vivian 50; TWJ Goddard 6/29 (14.4 overs)

England won by 130 runs
Old Trafford, Manchester
Umpires: W Reeves and EJ Smith

- England won the toss and elected to bat.
- 25 July was taken as a rest day
- AW Wellard (ENG) and N Gallichan (NZL) made their Test debuts.

Hutton made his maiden Test century in his second Test, and shared an opening partnership of 100 with Barnett, who made 62, and a second wicket partnership of 128 with Hardstaff, who made 58. England were 296 for three, but rash batting against Cowie and Gallichan led to six wickets falling for a further 62 runs before close of play. England declared overnight, and New Zealand, despite 58 from Vivian, were reduced to 119 for five before Hadlee, scoring 93, put on 99 with Page. England lost three wickets before close of play and had been reduced to 75 for seven on the final morning, just 152 ahead, mainly through fine seam bowling by Cowie. Freddie Brown, though, cajoled the tail into a further 112 runs. Cowie finished with match figures on 10 for 140. New Zealand's second innings, chasing 265, started well, and Vivian and Moloney put on 50 for the first wicket before Moloney was run out. Vivian went on to his second 50 of the match, but only Donnelly of the other batsmen reached double figures, and Tom Goddard, achieving a lot of turn with his off-breaks, took six for 29 to win the match.

=== 3rd Test ===
14–17 August 1937
Scorecard

New Zealand	v	England
249 (83.1 overs); MP Donnelly 58; RWV Robins 4/40 (14.1 overs)		254/7d (93 overs); J Hardstaff 103; J Cowie 3/73 (24 overs)
187 (68.4 overs); HG Vivian 57; WR Hammond 2/19 (11 overs)		31/1 (9.2 overs); CJ Barnett 21; JA Dunning 1/5 (1.2 overs)

Match drawn
The Oval, London
Umpires: A Dolphin and EJ Smith

- New Zealand won the toss and elected to bat.
- 15 August was taken as a rest day
- C Washbrook, DCS Compton and ADG Matthews (all ENG) made their Test debuts.

Only half an hour's play was possible on the first day because of rain. New Zealand struggled to 47 for four before 50s from Donnelly, Page and Roberts rescued them. England in turn lost three quick wickets, but Denis Compton, aged 19 and in his first Test, made 65 and Hardstaff 103. The declaration came at lunchtime on the final day and a result appeared possible when New Zealand, despite 57 out of 87 from Vivian, lost wickets regularly across the afternoon. But a late rally by Moloney and Tindill took the match out of England's reach, and the game petered out to a draw.

== First-class and other matches ==
Including the Test matches, 32 first-class games were played; nine were won, nine lost and 14 drawn.

In a damp start to the tour, Cambridge University were beaten in a low-scoring match, but there were defeats by Glamorgan, Lancashire (twice), Derbyshire and Worcestershire before the first Test, and no further victories in first-class matches.

After the Lord's Test, the New Zealanders won a high-scoring game against Somerset and beat Scotland. Form into August was patchy: a big score (495) and victory against Surrey at the end of July was followed by a heavy second defeat by Glamorgan. Essex were beaten just before the final Test and the Combined Services team in two days just afterwards. The English part of the tour ended with wins over Sussex and the Minor Counties, but defeats by Kent and H. D. G. Leveson-Gower's XI.

There was a remarkable codicil. The New Zealand team left Scarborough and arrived in Dublin next day for a three-day match against Ireland. But the match was over in a single day. Ireland made 79, with only four players reaching double figures; New Zealand's reply was worse, as only two players reached double figures in a total of 64. Then Cowie took six wickets for three runs in eight overs as Ireland made just 30 – 15 of those were scored by one batsman, 10 were byes and eight batsmen failed to score. New Zealand hit off the 46 runs for victory by eight wickets.

== Leading players ==
In a season when the weather was kinder than it often is in England, New Zealand's cricketers emerged with a record similar to that of the earlier tours in 1927 and 1931, with a pretty even balance of wins and losses, except that more matches came to a definite conclusion.

On the batting side, there were perhaps fewer stars than on the earlier tours, with Roger Blunt retired and Stewie Dempster captaining Leicestershire. In bowling too, Bill Merritt, the leading wicket-taker of the two previous visits, was now playing in the Lancashire League, and would then qualify for Northamptonshire, where the star wicketkeeper of 1927 and 1931, Ken James, was already ensconced in the side.

But the tour made the reputations of some younger players. Wallace and Donnelly were seen as the top youngsters, and they finished top of the first-class tour averages, though they did less well in the Tests. The most successful Test batsman was, surprisingly, Roberts, picked mainly for his bowling, and his average of 47.33 was surpassed on the England side by both Hardstaff and Hammond. Hadlee's 93 was the highest Test score, and Vivian's the highest Test aggregate at 194 runs in six innings.

In bowling, one player stood out. Cowie took 19 of the 40 Test wickets, and no other player on either side got into double figures – partly, perhaps, because England varied their bowling attack for each Test.

In the first-class season as a whole, Cowie again was what Wisden Cricketers' Almanack called "the outstanding player of the team". He took 114 wickets at less than 20 runs apiece. Dunning, with off-breaks, took 83 first-class wickets but they cost more than 30 runs each and he took only three Test wickets.

Six batsmen – Wallace, Donnelly, Moloney, Kerr, Hadlee and Vivian – passed 1,000 runs for the season, with Wallace's 1,641 at an average of 41.02 the best both in aggregate and average. Kerr's 160 against the Minor Counties was the highest score for the team. Tindill was an efficient wicketkeeper and the fielding as a whole was enthusiastic.

== Verdict and aftermath ==
The 1937 New Zealand tour was rated a disappointment by Wisden, which said the team had not fulfilled expectations. In mitigation, it added that a long, latterly dry but relatively cheerless summer had made the tour particularly arduous, and there had been little time for preparation.

In the event, for all except five of the team, the 1937 marked the end of their Test cricket, and for New Zealand there were no more Tests until the end of the Second World War. Then in consecutive domestic New Zealand seasons, there were single matches against first Australia in 1945-46 and then England in 1946-47, and in both matches Hadlee, Wallace, Tindill and Cowie played. Donnelly, another who went into English cricket with Oxford University and Warwickshire, re-emerged to rejoin the 1949 touring team, which was the next New Zealand side to visit England.
