= New Zealand cricket team in Australia and Ceylon in 1937–38 =

The New Zealand national cricket team toured Ceylon and Australia in October and November 1937 to play four matches, of which the three Australian matches are rated first-class. The New Zealand team was captained by Curly Page. They played the Ceylonese national team in Colombo and then three Australian state teams.

The New Zealand team were returning from their tour of England. The tour had not been financially successful, so the New Zealand Cricket Council hastily arranged the short tour of Australia in the hope of recouping their losses. The team was unchanged, except that Cyril Parsloe replaced Jack Dunning, who was unable to take any further time away from work.

== Tour matches ==
First match

17th October 1937
(1-day single innings match)
Scorecard

Ceylon	v	New Zealand
221/8d (59 overs); Fredrick de Saram 90; Sonny Moloney 4/53 (15 overs)		177/5 (29 overs); Giff Vivian 68*; Sargo Jayawickreme 3/36 (7 overs)

Match drawn
Colombo Cricket Club Ground, Colombo
Umpires: Henry de Zylva and SBL Perera

- Ceylon won the toss and decided to bat

Second match

5–8 November 1937
(4-day match)
Scorecard

New Zealand	v	South Australia
151 (52.3 overs); Lindsay Weir 38; Frank Ward 4/59 (12 overs)		331 (113.3 overs); Jack Badcock 114; Jack Cowie 3/72 (33 overs)
186 (45.2 overs); Giff Vivian 64; Frank Ward 7/62 (17.2 overs)		7/0 (3.3 overs); Jack Badcock 5*

South Australia won by 10 wickets
Adelaide Oval, Adelaide
Umpires: Arthur G. Jenkins and John Scott

- New Zealand won the toss and decided to bat

Third match

12–16 November 1937
(4-day match)
Scorecard

New Zealand	v	Victoria
210 (51.7 overs); Walter Hadlee 51; Ernie McCormick 3/38 (14 overs)		141 (49.3 overs); Jack Ledward 49*; Cyril Parsloe 5/47 (15 overs)
223 (54 overs); Giff Vivian 66; Ross Gregory 4/50 (13 overs)		293/5 (88.3 overs); Lindsay Hassett 127*; Giff Vivian 3/89 (32 overs)

Victoria won by 5 wickets
Melbourne Cricket Ground, Melbourne
Umpires: Andrew Barlow and Walter J. Moore

- New Zealand won the toss and decided to bat

Fourth match

19–22 November 1937
(4-day match)
Scorecard

New Zealand	v	New South Wales
195 (54.1 overs); Bill Carson 40; Bill O'Reilly 5/57 (18.1 overs)		274 (67.4 overs); Sid Barnes 97; Jack Cowie 4/76 (22 overs)
214 (53.1 overs); Merv Wallace 58; Bill O'Reilly 4/61 (1731 overs)		136/2 (35.6 overs); Arthur Chipperfield 67*; Jack Cowie 2/27 (6 overs)

New South Wales won by 8 wickets
Sydney Cricket Ground, Sydney
Umpires: George Borwick and Frederick Lyons

- New Zealand won the toss and decided to bat
