= Rupert Worker =

New Zealand cricketer (1896–1989)

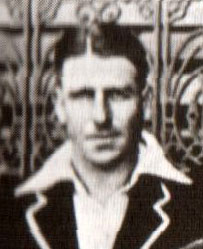
- Worker photographed during the 1920s

Personal information
- Full name: Rupert Vivian de Renzy Worker
- Born: 15 April 1896; Auckland, New Zealand
- Died: 23 April 1989 (aged 93); Napier, New Zealand
- Batting: Left-handed
- Role: Batsman
- Relatives: George Worker (great-nephew)

Domestic team information
- Years: Team
- 1914/15: Auckland
- 1919/20–1922/23: Canterbury
- 1923/24–1925/26: Otago
- 1926/27–1929/30: Wellington

Career statistics
Competition	First-class
Matches	37
Runs scored	2,338
Batting average	34.89
100s/50s	4/12
Top score	172
Balls bowled	54
Wickets	0
Bowling average	–
5 wickets in innings	–
10 wickets in match	–
Best bowling	–
Catches/stumpings	9/0
- Source: CricketArchive, 20 April 2014

Rupert Vivian de Renzy Worker (15 April 1896 – 23 April 1989) played first-class cricket in New Zealand between 1914 and 1929. He represented New Zealand in the years before New Zealand played Test cricket. He worked as a schoolteacher.

== Early career ==
Worker was born at Auckland in 1896 and educated at Auckland Grammar School. He made his first-class debut when he played one match for Auckland in the 1914–15 season. After graduating from Auckland University College he became a schoolmaster. While teaching at Christchurch Boys' High School he appeared for Canterbury, playing his first game as an opening batsman in the 1919–20 season. He was the outstanding batsman in Christchurch club cricket in 1919–20, scoring 609 runs at an average of 76.12 for West Christchurch. Nobody else scored more than 400 runs.

He became a regular player in the Canterbury team, but his achievements to the end of the 1922–23 season were modest: in 12 first-class matches he had made 510 runs at 22.17, with a top score of 65 (in an opening partnership of 208 with Roger Blunt) against MCC in 1922–23.

== Plunket Shield record ==
Worker transferred to Otago Boys' High School and began playing for Otago. He began the 1923–24 Plunket Shield season with 172 and 16 against Canterbury, then scored 93 and 34 against Auckland.

In the final match, against Wellington at Carisbrook, 1905 runs were scored over five days – which is still the seventh-highest aggregate in the history of first-class cricket – and Worker set the record for most runs in a Plunket Shield season. Wellington batted first and made 560, and Otago replied with 385, Worker scoring 106 and making an opening partnership of 154 in 76 minutes with James Shepherd. When Wellington made 465 in their second innings their opening batsman Syd Hiddleston scored 150 to set a new Plunket Shield record of 505 runs in a season. The next day Worker made 94, putting on 155 with Shepherd in 85 minutes, and beating Hiddleston's record by 10 runs, but Otago, needing 641 to win, were dismissed for 495. Hiddleston reclaimed the record in the 1925–26 season, when he made 537 runs.

After the Plunket Shield season ended, a New South Wales team played two matches against New Zealand. Worker made 8 and 37 for New Zealand in the first match, and a pair in the second.

In July 1924 Worker was awarded a Master of Arts degree from Otago University, with honours in history.

== Later career ==
In 1924–25 Worker made 205 runs in the Plunket Shield at an average of 41.00 and played both matches for New Zealand against Victoria, scoring 33, 34, 55 and 6.

He toured Australia with a New Zealand team in 1925–26, playing all four first-class matches, but finished seventh in both aggregates and averages, with 195 runs at 27.85.

He transferred to Wellington in 1926, playing three matches in 1926–27, two in 1927–28, and one each in 1928–29 and 1929–30. His success was modest, apart from his one match in 1928–29, when he made 151 and 73, top-scoring in each innings, and Wellington beat Auckland by 37 runs.

The New Zealand cricket writer Dick Brittenden described Worker as "a most brisk and businesslike man in nearly everything he did", and a batsman who made most of his runs on the leg side.

== Personal life ==
Worker married Lily Edith Emerson in Dunedin in December 1928. At the time he was teaching in Napier, where they lived for most of the rest of their lives. He was teaching a class at Napier Boys' High School on 3 February 1931 when the Napier earthquake struck, destroying most of the town.

Worker served in the Royal New Zealand Air Force during World War II as a flying officer. At the start of the 1947 school year he took up a position as secondary assistant master at Marton District High School. He died at Napier at the age of 93 in 1989. Obituaries were published in the 1989 New Zealand Cricket Almanack and the 1990 edition of Wisden Cricketers' Almanack.
