= Reginald Hollingdale =

Reginald Hollingdale may refer to:

- R. J. Hollingdale (1930–2001), British biographer and translator of German philosophy and literature
- Reginald Hollingdale (cricketer) (1906–1989), Scottish cricketer
