= Richard Rowntree =

New Zealand cricketer (1884–1968)

- Rowntree in 1931

Personal information
- Full name: Richard William Rowntree
- Born: 6 April 1884; Leyburn, Yorkshire, England
- Died: 16 June 1968 (aged 84); Auckland, New Zealand
- Batting: Right-handed
- Role: Wicket-keeper

Domestic team information
- Years: Team
- 1914/15–1931/32: Auckland

Career statistics
Competition	First-class
Matches	33
Runs scored	308
Batting average	9.33
100s/50s	0/0
Top score	48
Catches/stumpings	57/38
- Source: Cricinfo, 12 September 2013

Richard William Rowntree (6 April 1884 – 16 June 1968) was a New Zealand cricketer who played 33 first-class matches, all but two of them for Auckland.

Born at Leyburn in Yorkshire, Rowntree played as a wicket-keeper and tail-end right-handed batsman. He played for Yorkshire Second XI in 1905. After a serious illness he migrated to New Zealand. He played his first game for Auckland in the 1914–15 season and his last at the age of 47 in the 1931–32 season. His career in Auckland senior club cricket extended from 1907 to 1935, when he was awarded a benefit match at the end of his last season. He was noted for standing up to the stumps to bowlers of all paces. A crucial stumping he made off the Test opening bowler Jack Cowie helped his Auckland club team win the championship in the 1930s.

Rowntree appeared in both matches New Zealand played against the visiting Australian team in 1920–21. Earlier in the tour he had made his highest score of 48: batting at number 11 for Auckland he added 75 for the last wicket with Eddie McLeod after the Australians had taken the first nine Auckland wickets for 73. He was selected as the principal wicket-keeper in the New Zealand team to tour Australia in 1925–26 but was unable to go, and was replaced by Ken James.

In the First World War, Rowntree served as a private in the New Zealand Medical Corps on the Hospital Ship No. 2 Marama. At the time of his enlistment he was working as a commercial traveller and he and his wife Lilian were living in the Auckland suburb of Mount Albert.

Rowntree died in hospital in Auckland after a short illness in June 1968, aged 84. He and Lilian had two sons and a daughter.
