= Cyril Parsloe =

New Zealand cricketer

Personal information
- Full name: Cyril Keith Parsloe
- Born: 27 September 1908; Wellington, New Zealand
- Died: 13 September 1989 (aged 80); Wellington
- Batting: Left-handed
- Bowling: Right-arm fast-medium

Domestic team information
- Years: Team
- 1932-33 to 1939-40: Wellington

Career statistics
Competition	First-class
Matches	19
Runs scored	427
Batting average	13.34
100s/50s	–/1
Top score	59
Balls bowled	3429
Wickets	69
Bowling average	22.14
5 wickets in innings	3
10 wickets in match	1
Best bowling	7/66
Catches/stumpings	9/–
- Source: Cricinfo, 16 November 2017

Cyril Keith Parsloe (27 September 1908 – 13 September 1989) was a cricketer who played first-class cricket for Wellington from 1932 to 1940. He played for New Zealand, but not in Test matches.

An accurate fast-medium bowler and tail-end batsman who played in spectacles, Parsloe achieved good pace from a short run-up. He had his most successful match in 1935-36 in the Plunket Shield against Otago, when he took 4 for 37 and 7 for 66 in Wellington's 80-run victory. Unusually, he also opened the batting in this match, scoring 25 and 8. Wellington went on to win the Plunket Shield, and Parsloe led the competition averages with 18 wickets at an average of 12.88.

On the way back by ship from their tour of England in 1937, the New Zealanders played three first-class matches against Australian state teams. Cyril Parsloe joined the team in place of Jack Dunning, who was unable to take any further time away from work. He played all three matches and had New Zealand's best bowling figures of the short tour, 5 for 47 against Victoria. In Sydney, while crossing the Harbour Bridge with some of his teammates, he caught and stopped a runaway cart-horse that had thrown its driver.

He also played rugby union for the Poneke and Johnsonville clubs, and represented Wellington.
