= Cyril Allcott =

New Zealand cricketer

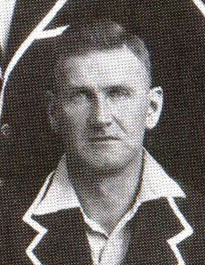
- Allcott in 1931

Personal information
- Full name: Cyril Francis Walter Allcott
- Born: 7 October 1896; Lower Moutere, Tasman, New Zealand
- Died: 19 November 1973 (aged 77); Auckland, New Zealand
- Height: 5 ft 11 in (1.80 m)
- Batting: Left-handed
- Bowling: Slow left-arm orthodox

International information
- National side: New Zealand (1930–1932)
- Test debut (cap 15): 14 February 1930 v England
- Last Test: 4 March 1932 v South Africa

Domestic team information
- Years: Team
- 1920/21: Hawke's Bay
- 1921/22–1931/32: Auckland
- 1945/46: Otago

Career statistics
Competition	Test	First-class
Matches	6	82
Runs scored	113	2,514
Batting average	22.60	27.93
100s/50s	0/0	5/5
Top score	33	131
Balls bowled	1,206	16,620
Wickets	6	220
Bowling average	90.16	26.78
5 wickets in innings	0	13
10 wickets in match	0	2
Best bowling	2/102	7/75
Catches/stumpings	3/–	61/–
- Source: Cricinfo, 31 December 2021

Cyril Francis Walter Allcott (7 October 1896 – 19 November 1973) was a New Zealand Test cricketer who played in six Test matches for the New Zealand national cricket team between 1930 and 1932.

== Early life ==
Allcott was born at Lower Moutere in 1896. He attended Marlborough High School on a scholarship and found work as a clerk in the National Bank of New Zealand when he left school. Allcott played club cricket for Marlborough Allcott enlisted in the New Zealand Army in October 1917, towards the end of World War I. He embarked for Europe on the SS Ulimaroa, arriving at London in October, before the Armistice although he did not see action at the front. He was discharged from the army in September 1919.

== Cricket career ==
Following the war, Allcott played club cricket in the Napier area before making his first-class cricket debut for Hawke's Bay in February 1921 in a match against a touring Australian team. He went on to play the majority of his domestic first-class cricket for Auckland between 1921/22 and 1931/32. He played as an allrounder who bowled slow left-arm orthodox deliveries and batted left-handed.

Much of Allcott's cricket was played in the years immediately before New Zealand gained Test match status. (Note: New Zealand played their first Test match in 1930.) He toured Australia in 1925/26 and England in 1927 with New Zealand representative teams before playing in New Zealand's third and fourth Test matches in 1930 against the touring England team. He toured England with New Zealand in 1931, playing in all three Test matches on the tour as well as being responsible for managing the team's finances during the tour, before making his final Test appearance in the last Test of the home series against South Africa in 1932. He scored a total of 113 runs and took six wickets in his six Test matches, with his Wisden obituary noting that although he was a "good allrounder" who had a number of "notable performances" in first-class matches to his name, he had "achieved little in Test cricket"―although in 1932 the almanack had described his batting partnership with Tom Lowry in the first Test against England, which New Zealand drew, as "determined".

Allcott's final Test appearance was the last of his first-class career until he played a single match for Otago against Auckland in the 1945/46 Plunket Shield, having played a domestic non first-class match for the team during World War II and club cricket in Dunedin for Kaikorai during World War II―the Evening Star newspaper reporting that despite his age he was still bowling unchanged in club cricket for "close on three hours", his left-arm inswing deliveries still "pretty difficult to play". In his final first-class match he bowled 38 eight-ball overs and took three wickets, despite fracturing a toe whilst batting.

== Later life ==
Allcott retired from club cricket in 1947 at over 50 years of age. He also played golf and entered the Auckland Open for the first time in 1957. He died at Auckland in 1973. He was aged 77.
