= John Banks (cricketer) =

English cricketer

Personal information
- Full name: John Elliott Banks
- Born: 26 May 1903; Edmonton, Middlesex, England
- Died: 20 October 1979 (aged 76); Wellington, New Zealand
- Batting: Right-handed
- Role: Batsman

Domestic team information
- Years: Team
- 1923/24–1925/26: Wellington

Career statistics
Competition	First-class
Matches	7
Runs scored	217
Batting average	24.11
100s/50s	0/1
Top score	76*
Catches/stumpings	1/–
- Source: Cricinfo, 29 March 2017

John Elliott Banks (26 May 1903 – 20 October 1979) was a New Zealand cricketer who played first-class cricket for Wellington from 1924 to 1926.

Banks was born in England and moved to New Zealand with his family in about 1909. He attended Wellington College.

A middle-order batsman, Banks' highest first-class score was 76 not out, the highest score of the match when Wellington beat the touring Victorian team narrowly in 1924–25. In November 1925 he was selected in the New Zealand team to tour Australia that summer, but he was unavailable and had to withdraw; he was replaced by Tom Lowry. Later that month, playing for Institute against Wellington, he scored 260, setting a new record for senior club cricket in Wellington. Banks later served as treasurer of the Wellington Cricket Association.

Banks worked in Wellington as a company director.
