= London New Zealand =

London New Zealand could refer to:

- London New Zealand Cricket Club
- London New Zealand RFC
