= Henry Vivian =

Henry Vivian may refer to:

- Giff Vivian (Henry Gifford Vivian, 1912–1983), New Zealand cricketer
- Henry Vivian, 1st Baron Swansea (1821–1894), Welsh industrialist and politician
- Henry Vivian (trade unionist) (1868–1930), pioneer of UK co-partnership housing movement, politician & trade unionist

== See also ==
- John Henry Vivian (1785–1855), industrialist and politician
