= Raymond Hope =

New Zealand cricketer

Ray Hope
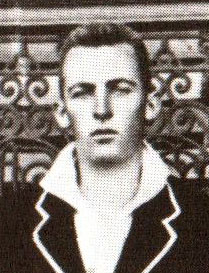
- Hope during the 1925–26 season

Personal information
- Full name: Raymond William Hope
- Born: 19 January 1904; Wanganui, New Zealand
- Died: 24 June 1978 (aged 74); Christchurch, New Zealand
- Nickname: Punker
- Batting: Right-handed
- Bowling: Right-arm fast-medium

Domestic team information
- Years: Team
- 1928/29–1929/30: Wellington
- 1933/34: Canterbury

Career statistics
Competition	First-class
Matches	7
Runs scored	68
Batting average	9.71
100s/50s	0/0
Top score	29
Balls bowled	1,343
Wickets	16
Bowling average	49.31
5 wickets in innings	0
10 wickets in match	0
Best bowling	3/61
Catches/stumpings	5/–
- Source: CricketArchive, 5 December 2014

Raymond William "Punker" Hope (19 January 1904 – 24 June 1978) was a New Zealand cricketer who played first-class cricket from 1925 to 1934 and played for New Zealand in the days before the country played Test cricket.

A tall fast bowler, Ray Hope was selected in the New Zealand team to tour Australia in 1925–26 before he had played a first-class match. Several of the originally selected players had had to withdraw, and Hope was the final replacement chosen. His senior cricket had been played for Manawatu. In Manawatu's match against the touring Victorians in 1924–25 he and Norman Gallichan had dismissed the Victorians for 191 to give Manawatu a 14-run first-innings lead. In November 1925, a few days before the team to Australia was finalised, he took 5 for 3 in a club match in Palmerston North.

Hope played in two of the four matches against Australian state teams on the tour, taking three wickets at an average of 84.00. His next first-class matches were for Wellington, one match in 1928–29 and one in 1929–30, again for a total of three wickets. He then played the full Plunket Shield season of three matches for Canterbury in 1933–34, taking three wickets in the first innings of each match, and finishing with 10 wickets at 38.20. In the later part of his career ill-health affected his stamina, and he was more effective in club games than at first-class level.

Hope also played rugby for Manawatu.

Hope was a district public trustee in Hastings, then a public trustee in Christchurch for 10 years until he retired. He married Elma May Grover in Christchurch in April 1935. He died in Christchurch in June 1978, aged 74, survived by Elma and their two sons.
