= Charlie Oliver (rugby union) =

New Zealand rugby union player

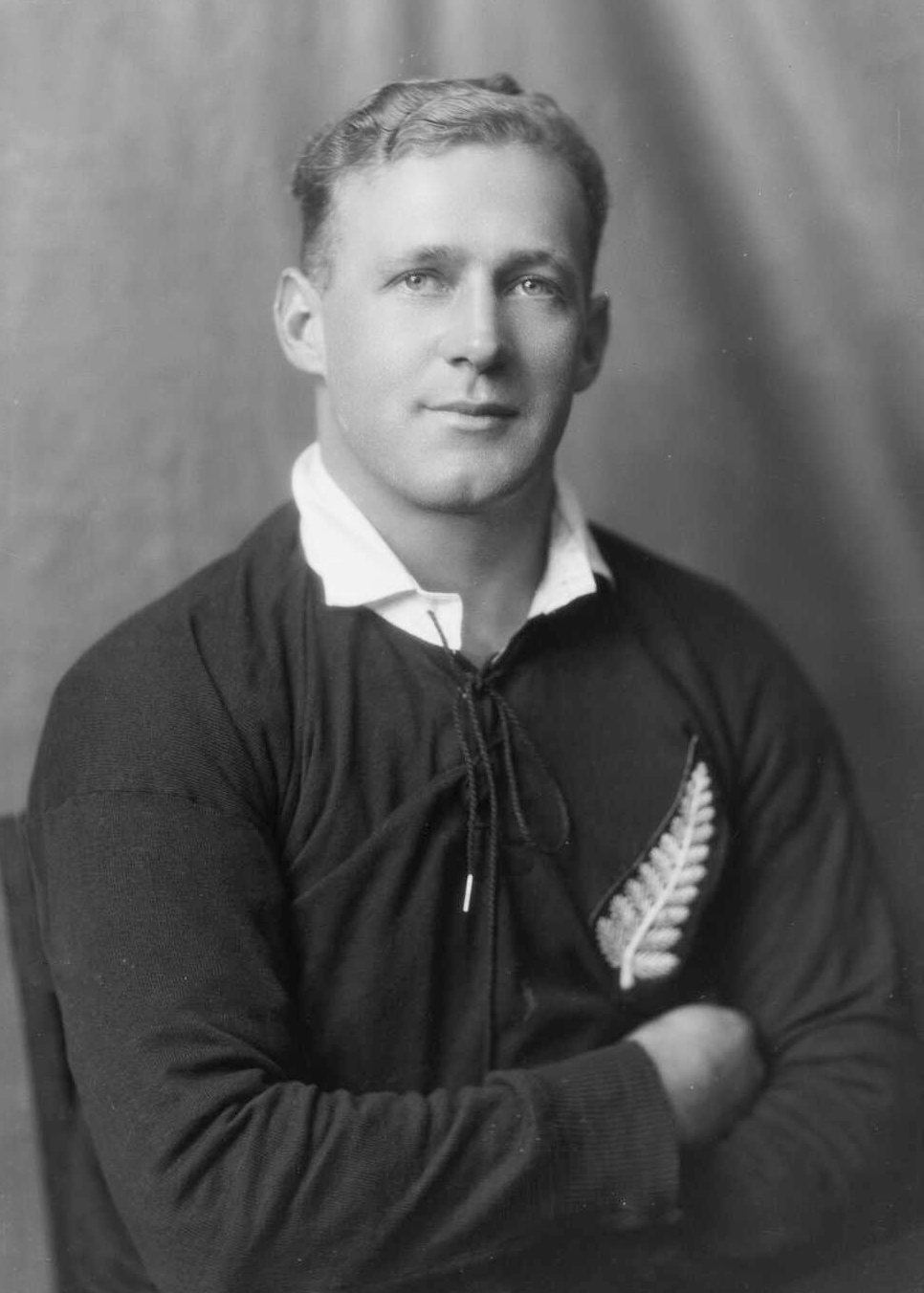
- Born: Charles Joshua Oliver; 1 November 1905 Wanganui, New Zealand
- Died: 25 September 1977 (aged 71) Brisbane, Australia
- Height: 1.78 m (5 ft 10 in)
- Weight: 76 kg (168 lb)

Rugby union career
- Position: Second five-eighth
Provincial / State sides
Years	Team	Apps	(Points)
- Canterbury
International career
Years	Team	Apps	(Points)
1929–1936	New Zealand	7	(6)
- Cricket career

Cricket information
- Batting: Right-handed

Domestic team information
- Years: Team
- 1923/24–1936/37: Canterbury

Career statistics
Competition	First-class
Matches	35
Runs scored	1,301
Batting average	23.23
100s/50s	0/9
Top score	91
Balls bowled	320
Wickets	1
Bowling average	169.00
5 wickets in innings	0
10 wickets in match	0
Best bowling	1/35
Catches/stumpings	20/–
- Source: CricketArchive, 9 December 2014

Charles Joshua Oliver (1 November 1905 – 25 September 1977) was a New Zealand rugby union international who also represented his country in first-class cricket.

== Cricket career ==
Wanganui-born Oliver played as a specialist right-handed batsman and from 35 first-class matches scored 1301 runs at 23.23, with a best of 91. He represented Canterbury in domestic cricket, having debuted for them in the 1923/24 Plunket Shield. In the 1925/26 season he was a member of the New Zealand side which toured Australia and he made half-centuries against Victoria and South Australia. He also toured the British Isles in 1927 with the national side. He claimed the only wicket of his first-class career during this tour, that of Sussex bowler Reginald Hollingdale.

New Zealand didn't gain Test status in cricket until 1930, by which time Oliver had decided to focus on his rugby, thus missing out on a chance to become a Test 'double international'. He continued to play senior club cricket in Christchurch, leading the competition's batting in the 1934–35 season with 972 runs and setting a record with five centuries.

== Rugby career ==
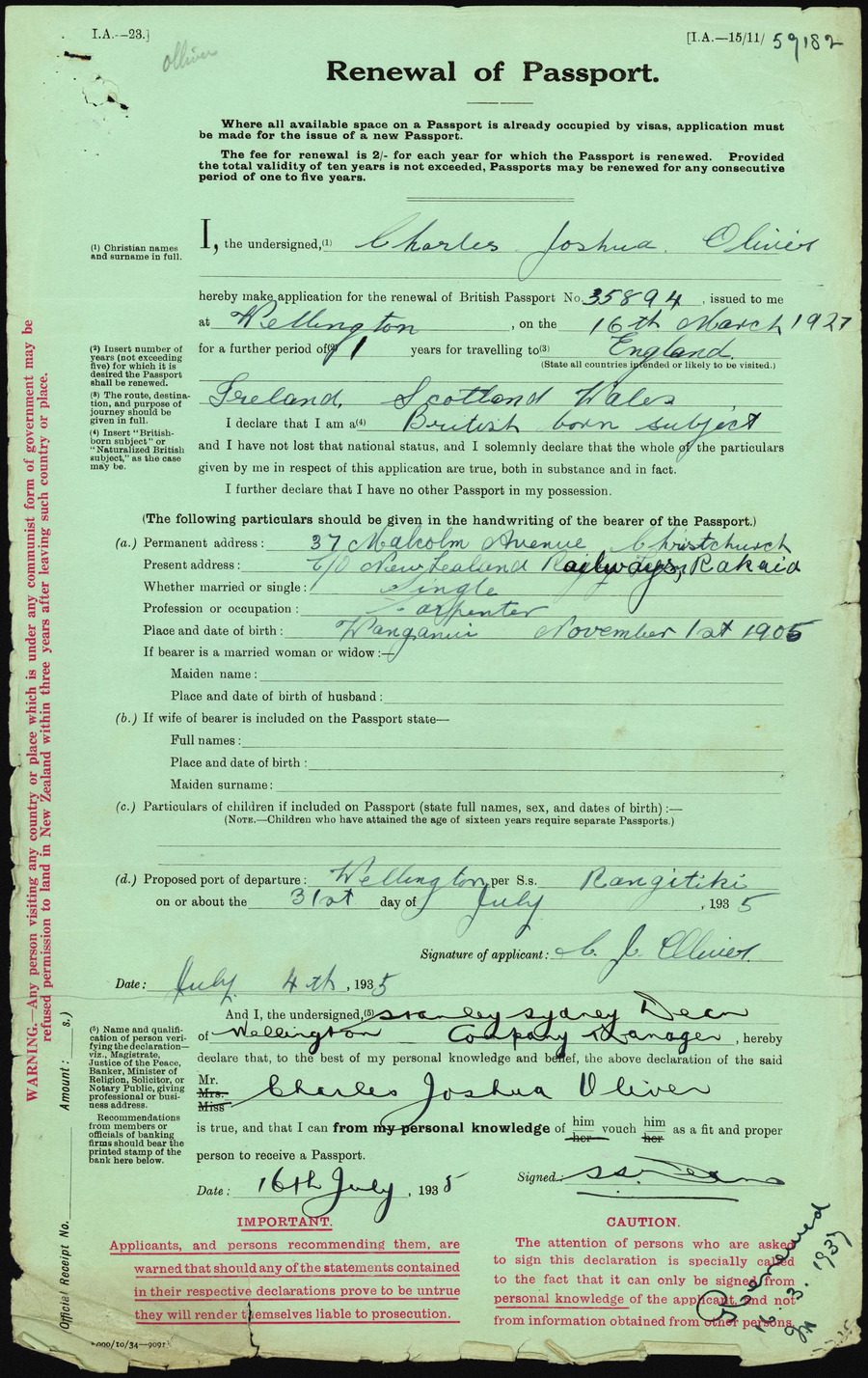
Charles Joshua Oliver passport renewal application (1935)

Oliver's early rugby had been played with Merivale before he made his way into the Canterbury side. He toured Australia in 1929 and made his Test debut for the All Blacks in a match against Australia at Sydney, aged 23. For the 1935/36 tour of Great Britain, Oliver was vice-captain and appeared in four Tests. By the time he retired he had amassed seven Test caps and 33 All Black matches in all, for 58 points.

== Personal life ==
Oliver married Jean Frances Gurney in Christchurch in August 1936. He spent the final years of his life in Australia, dying in Brisbane in September 1977, aged 71. His son-in-law Dave Gillespie was also an All Black.
