= New Zealand cricket team in England in 1931 =

International cricket tour

The New Zealand cricket team toured England in the 1931 season. The tour was the first tour by a New Zealand team in which Test matches were arranged. Originally, only one Test was planned, but New Zealand acquitted themselves so well in the first match and in the game against MCC that matches against Surrey and Lancashire were hastily replaced by two further Test matches. Of the three Tests played, the first was drawn, the second was won comfortably by England; the third was heavily affected by rain and also drawn. The tour as a whole was blighted by poor weather, and 23 of the 32 first-class matches ended as draws.

== Background ==
In 1926, the Imperial Cricket Conference, forerunner of the International Cricket Council, allowed for the first time delegates from India, New Zealand and the West Indies to attend. The three were invited to organise themselves into cricket boards that could, in future, select representative teams to take part in Test matches, which had hitherto been restricted to sides from England, Australia and South Africa.

A non-Test playing visit from a side from New Zealand had already been arranged for the 1927 season, and this tour went ahead without Test matches before a decision was taken on whether New Zealand was ready for Test cricket. In the event, the 1927 side did well enough to get an official (though scarcely full-strength) MCC tour agreed for 1929-30, in which New Zealand's first-ever Tests were played. And future New Zealand tours of England, from this 1931 tour onwards, were full Test match tours.

== The 1931 New Zealand team ==
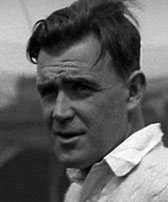
The team's captain, Tom Lowry

As in 1927, the team was captained by Tom Lowry, the former Cambridge University and Somerset batsman. Lowry also acted as the tour manager for much of the season until A. T. Donnelly, the chairman of the New Zealand Cricket Council, arrived for the second half of the tour. According to Wisden's 1932 edition, Allcott looked after the tour finances.

The touring side's players were:

- Tom Lowry, captain (and reserve wicketkeeper)
- Cyril Allcott
- Roger Blunt
- Ian Cromb
- Stewie Dempster
- Ken James, wicketkeeper
- Jack Kerr
- Mal Matheson
- Bill Merritt
- Jackie Mills
- Curly Page
- Ron Talbot
- Giff Vivian
- Lindsay Weir

Of the 14 players, 13 appeared in at least one Test match on the tour, the exception being Talbot, who never played Test cricket. Lowry, Allcott, Blunt, Dempster, James, Merritt, Mills and Page had been members of the 1927 touring team.

== The Test matches ==
A single Test match, at Lord's at the end of June, was scheduled. But the touring team did so well in this match and in the earlier showpiece match with MCC that county matches against Surrey and Lancashire later in the summer were replaced by further Tests.

=== First Test Match, Lord's, 27–30 June 1931 ===
27–30 June 1931
Scorecard

New Zealand	v	England
224 (74.3 overs); CS Dempster 53; IAR Peebles 5/77 (26 overs)		454 (134 overs); LEG Ames 137; WE Merritt 4/104 (23 overs)
469/9d (157.4 overs); CS Dempster 120; IAR Peebles 4/150 (42.4 overs)		146/5 (55 overs); WR Hammond 46; IB Cromb 2/44 (25 overs)

Match drawn
Lord's, London
Umpires: F Chester and J Hardstaff

- New Zealand won the toss and elected to bat.
- JL Kerr, IB Cromb (both NZL), and AH Bakewell and J Arnold (both ENG) made their Test debuts.

Dempster made 53 and New Zealand were 132 for two at lunch on the first day, but the innings subsided against the spin of Ian Peebles (five for 77) and Walter Robins. Cromb and Merritt then reduced England to 190 for seven at the end of the first day, and Frank Woolley had made 80 of those. On the Monday, an eighth wicket partnership of 246 between Leslie Ames (137) and Gubby Allen (122) – still the record England eighth wicket partnership – took England to a lead of 230. Dempster, with 120, Page (104) and Blunt (96) all scored well in New Zealand's reply, and a late partnership by Lowry and Allcott enabled the tourists to declare, setting England 240 to win in 140 minutes.

=== Second Test Match, The Oval, 29–31 July 1931 ===
29–31 July 1931
Scorecard

England	v	New Zealand
416/4d (131.3 overs); H Sutcliffe 117; HG Vivian 2/96 (34.3 overs)		193 (95.1 overs); TC Lowry 62; GOB Allen 5/14 (13 overs)
		197 (f/o) (84.3 overs); HG Vivian 51; IAR Peebles 4/63 (22 overs)

England won by an innings and 26 runs
The Oval, London
Umpires: F Chester and J Hardstaff

- England won the toss and elected to bat.
- FR Brown, H Verity (both ENG) and HG Vivian (NZL) made their Test debuts.

Centuries by Herbert Sutcliffe, Duleepsinhji and Wally Hammond led England to a big total, and New Zealand, lacking Dempster, who was injured, wilted against Gubby Allen, who took five for 14 in 13 overs. Only Lowry, with 62, made runs and Maurice Tate, though taking only one wicket, bowled 18 overs for just 15 runs. Following on, New Zealand's batsmen struggled again, with only Vivian (51), Blunt (43), Mills (30) and Kerr (28) getting a start. The match, which had lost some time to rain, was over in the mid-afternoon of the third day.

=== Third Test Match, Manchester, 15–18 August 1931 ===
15–18 August 1931
Scorecard

England	v	New Zealand
224/3 (71 overs); H Sutcliffe 109*; HG Vivian 2/54 (14 overs)

Match drawn
Old Trafford, Manchester
Umpires: F Chester and J Hardstaff

- New Zealand won the toss and elected to field.
- 16 August was taken as a rest day
- There was no play on the first and second days
- E Paynter (ENG) made his Test debut.

Rain ruined the match, and a start could not be made until midway through the last afternoon. Sutcliffe, with an unbeaten 109, scored his second century of the series.

== First-class and other matches ==
A total of 32 first-class matches, including the three Tests, were played, but only nine of them came to a definite result in a very wet summer. The New Zealanders won the matches against Essex, MCC, Northamptonshire, Scotland, Glamorgan and Gloucestershire. Apart from their Test defeat, they also lost to Middlesex and Kent.

The first two victories were perhaps the best performances of the season. In the very first match of the tour, Dempster hit 212 as New Zealand made 425 against Essex, and Merritt took 12 wickets for 130 runs (including eight for 41 in the second innings) as the tourists won by an innings and 48 runs. Three matches later, a strong MCC side with 10 amateurs was beaten by an innings and 122 runs: New Zealand made 302 for nine declared in an innings that, because of rain, took up the first two days. Then MCC were dismissed for 132, with Cromb taking six for 46, and then for just 48, with Merritt taking seven for 28.

== Leading players ==
As in 1927, New Zealand's batting proved rather stronger than the bowling, and Dempster, with 1,778 runs at an average of 59.26 runs per innings, finished fifth in the overall season's averages and top of the tourists' averages. As in 1927, Blunt finished second to Dempster, and his record of 1,592 runs at 43.02 was very similar to his own record in 1927 and also included the highest individual score of the tour, an unbeaten 225 against the Gentlemen of England at Eastbourne. Four other players, Mills, Lowry, Vivian and Weir, passed 1,000 runs for the season in first-class matches, and Page reached 990. Every player except Allcott (who had scored two centuries in 1927) averaged 16 or more runs per innings.

The bowling was less successful, and though Merritt was again the leading wicket-taker, his 99 wickets cost 26.48 runs each. Vivian, with 64 first-class wickets to go alongside 1,002 runs, was the leading all-rounder, but Blunt's leg-spin was less effective, and his 34 wickets cost more than 34 runs apiece.

Wisden reported that the fielding, which had been a weak point on the 1927 tour, was much improved, and as it had done after the 1927 tour it singled out the wicketkeeping of James for particular praise.

== Verdict and aftermath ==
Wisden reported that the touring team approached the season realistically, not expecting to win many matches but seeking to learn from the experience. The almanack took the view that it had been a mistake to expand the Test match programme to three matches after the success against MCC and the draw in the Lord's Test, but noted that the finances had suffered because of the wet summer, and that this may have influenced the decision.

In the winter following the 1931 tour of England, New Zealand played their first Test matches against a side other than England, with the visit to New Zealand of a South African side fresh from a heavy defeat in Australia. Eight of the 1931 side played in these matches, but Lowry had retired from Test cricket and the team was captained by Page. Both matches were lost, largely due to second innings batting failures.

== Annual reviews ==
- Wisden Cricketers' Almanack 1932 and 1933 editions
