= London New Zealand Cricket Club =

English cricket club

London New Zealand Cricket Club ("LNZCC")

Team information
- Colors: Red, Pacific Blue and Silver
- Founded: December 1951
- Home ground: Wandering side formerly Aorangi Park (Wimbledon) until 1981
- Official website: www.lnzcc.org

The London New Zealand Cricket Club is a cricket club in London, England, founded in December 1951 at New Zealand's High Commission to the United Kingdom and plays teams in the United Kingdom and Europe.

Various players of the New Zealand national cricket team (and other international cricket teams), the All Blacks, and first-class players have appeared for the club over the years, although players of all abilities are welcome provided they are from New Zealand or have a deep connection thereto.

LNZCC raises its own teams and plays non-competition games at the grounds of the opposition. Many of the teams are competitive club teams or established friendly teams and many of the grounds are notable for their location and quality, for example, the early season fixture against Wimbledon who play in the Surrey Championship and who play at the Wimbledon Cricket Club Ground, located opposite the All England Lawn Tennis and Croquet Club; the match vs the Honourable Artillery Company who play at the Artillery Ground in Finsbury in the City of London; against The Hurlingham Club, an exclusive sports and social club located in Fulham, London, England. Other notable fixtures are played at Ripley in Surrey, vs Goodwood on The Duke of Richmond and Gordon's estate overlooking Goodwood House near Chichester and against Hagley CC at Hagley Hall, the seat of the Lyttelton family and home of current Lord Chris and Lady Tessa Cobham. The club has also played against touring New Zealand cricket team sides and the Marylebone Cricket Club.

== History and role ==
The genesis of LNZCC was New Zealander Trevor Campbell shortly after World War II, in his role as the ‘Public Relations Officer’ of the NZ High Commission. Campbell posited that the UK was very grateful to New Zealand for its assistance of Great Britain in World War II and such signs of gratitude could be extended through cricket, a game widely popular in both countries, and that games could be played against teams who would no doubt feature returned servicemen who fought with New Zealanders during World War II.

Campbell was based at the New Zealand High Commission in the former ‘Dominion of New Zealand’ building, 415 The Strand, London and sought the help of Errol Holmes former England test cricketer, MCC captain to New Zealand in 1935/36 and then-current MCC committee member, in establishing a club. With the added support of NZ High Commissioner Sir Frederick Doidge and the MCC, Campbell invited more than 200 well-known New Zealanders living in the UK to meet.

LNZCC was formed at the New Zealand High Commission in December 1951 during severe smog conditions. It was decided that the aim of LNZCC (which continues to this day, as well as meeting at the New Zealand High Commission building for a mid-season function) was to "provide the opportunity for its members to play and enjoy cricket in the home of the game and to meet socially".

More than 70 people attended the meeting that formed LNZCC including many illustrious sporting and military names. In attendance – Sir Arthur Simms; Sir Arthur Donnelly; Harold Gilligan (Captain of the England team that played New Zealand's first ever test;) LEL Donne; Walter Hadlee; Roger Blunt; Alan Mitchell amongst others. At the meeting, Roger Blunt, a former New Zealand cricket team captain, was made the first Club Captain and Errol Holmes the first President, Campbell Honorary Secretary and invitations to stand as Vice-President were sent to then New Zealand Prime Minister Sir Sidney Holland and to High Commissioner Sir Frederick Doidge. The first two men elected VP were Lord Newall (Cyril Newall, ex Governor-General of NZ and Marshall of the Royal Air Force during WW2) and Lord Freyberg VC (as General Bernard Freyberg, Commander of the NZ Expeditionary Force in WW2; earlier in his career he was awarded the Victoria Cross in the Battle of the Somme in 1916; later he was Governor- General of NZ.)

Amongst the active members of LNZCC were New Zealand test cricketers Tom Pritchard, Don Taylor, Roger Blunt, Bill Merritt and John Reid; Jim Laker, Ray Hitchcock (327 first-class games and 12,500 runs) and former All Black captain Ron Elvidge.

A fixture list was soon created and the following year LNZCC was listed in the MCC's 'Register of Clubs' at Lord's Cricket Ground.

The Club Captain role has long since ceased but the President role continues with a change to 'Chairman' and together with a committee, LNZCC continues to attract cricket-playing New Zealanders and a small number of friends from the Commonwealth.

In 2002, LNZCC observed its 50th anniversary when Paddy Gaffikin, an LNZCC newcomer in the 1966 season when New Zealanders arrived in the United Kingdom on ocean liners rather than long-haul aeroplanes, authored a history of the club entitled 'Kiwis on the Common'. The Golden Jubilee season, and Diamond Jubilee season in 2012, were both celebrated at The Oval, home ground of the Surrey cricket team (who LNZCC has also played).

LNZCC continues to this day through the help of volunteers who provide a cricketing base and network for UK-based New Zealanders, be they young 'backpackers' on their 'OE', sportsmen playing in the UK, or established business people. Current and past membership of LNZCC is wide. LNZCC also has branches in Auckland, Wellington and Christchurch, New Zealand and games are played in LNZCC colours by members in New Zealand.

== Interesting facts ==
Members of the LNZCC are known to wear striped blazers to games and social events. The blazers are made up of vertical stripes in the colours of the club, representing The City of London (red), the Silver Fern which is a sporting symbol of New Zealand (silver) and the waters of the Pacific Ocean (Pacific blue).

Ripley Cricket Club is the only fixture to have been played uninterrupted since the first season in 1952.

Since 2008 all LNZCC players are capped with ‘Nottman Caps’ once they have played five games. The Nottman Cap is named after Harold Nottman who was one of LNZCC's longest-serving playing members (from the 1950s to the 1990s no less) and a notable administrator in the club's history. One of his finest days on the cricket field for LNZCC was against Ripley Cricket Club when he took nine wickets in a match.

Overseas tours have included Porto in Portugal, matches vs teams in Denmark in the 1960s and a special match vs the Monte Carlo Cricket Club in Bouyon in the Alpes-Maritime near Nice. Since 2013, LNZCC has toured the Mediterranean for matches in Ibiza, Spain against the island's cricket team.

Naturally, members of the club are supporters of the New Zealand cricket team and have often made the news when traveling around the world for that purpose.

== Notable players ==
List principally sourced from 'Kiwis on the Common'

New Zealand national cricket team

- Martin Donnelly
- Don Taylor
- Ray Hitchcock
- Roger Blunt
- Bill Merritt
- John Guy
- Bill Merritt
- Billy Griffith
- John Reid
- Dayle Hadlee
- Eric Gillott
- Sir Richard Hadlee
- Martin Crowe
- Bert Sutcliffe
- Aaron Gale
- Hamish Marshall
- Jack Kerr
- Bob Cunis
- Ian Cromb
- Tony MacGibbon
- Dave Crowe
- Andre Adams
- Graeme Thomson

(A number of first-class and List A players who have not played internationally have also played for the club, e.g. Scott Baldwin, Luke Vivian, and various Oxford and Cambridge Blues players)

All Blacks

- Zinzan Brooke
- Ron Elvidge
- Sam Harding
- Ian Botting
- Tony Davies
- Scott Cartwright

West Indies national cricket team

- Gerry Alexander

South African cricket team

- Graeme Pollock

English cricket team

- David White

New Zealand Football Team

- Tinoi Christie

Other

- Bryan Ashbridge Principal ballet dancer of the Royal Ballet (Sadler's Wells Ballet School)
- Dennis Coombe (New Zealand Davis Cup team)
- Nicholas Davidson QC (New Zealand QC and High Court Judge) (List of King's and Queen's Counsel in New Zealand)
