= International cricket in 1927 =

International cricket season

The 1927 International cricket season was from April 1927 to August 1927.

== Season overview ==
International tours
| Start date | Home team | Away team | Results [Matches] | | | |
| Start date | Home team | Away team | Test | ODI | FC | LA |
|---|---|---|---|---|---|---|
| 11 May 1927 | England | New Zealand | — | — | 0–0 [2] | — |
| 1 June 1927 | England | Wales | — | — | 1–0 [1] | — |
| 25 June 1927 | England | England Rest | — | — | 0–0 [3] | — |
| 9 July 1927 | Ireland | Scotland | — | — | 0–0 [1] | — |
| 1 August 1927 | Netherlands | Foresters | — | — | 0–2 [3] | — |
| 3 September 1927 | Wales | New Zealand | — | — | 0–0 [1] | — |

== May ==
=== New Zealand in England ===
Three-day match series
| No. | Date | Home captain | Away captain | Venue | Result |
|---|---|---|---|---|---|
| Match | 11–13 May | Johnny Douglas | Tom Lowry | Lord's, London | Match drawn |
| Match | 10–13 September | Johnny Douglas | Tom Lowry | North Marine Road Ground, Scarborough | Match drawn |

== June ==
=== Wales in England ===
Two-day Match
| No. | Date | Home captain | Away captain | Venue | Result |
|---|---|---|---|---|---|
| Match | 1–3 June | Not mentioned | Not mentioned | Lord's, London | Marylebone by 7 wickets |

=== Test trial in England ===
Three-day match series
| No. | Date | Home captain | Away captain | Venue | Result |
|---|---|---|---|---|---|
| Match 1 | 25–28 June | Not mentioned | Not mentioned | Bramall Lane, Sheffield | Match drawn |
| Match 2 | 23–26 July | Douglas Jardine | Not mentioned | The Royal & Sun Alliance County Ground, Bristol | Match drawn |
| Match 3 | 10–13 August | Douglas Jardine | Not mentioned | Lord's, London | Match drawn |

== July ==
=== Scotland in Ireland ===
Three-day Match
| No. | Date | Home captain | Away captain | Venue | Result |
|---|---|---|---|---|---|
| Match | 9–12 July | Bob Lambert | CS Paterson | College Park, Dublin | Match drawn |

== August ==
=== Foresters in Netherlands ===
Two-day match series
| No. | Date | Home captain | Away captain | Venue | Result |
|---|---|---|---|---|---|
| Match 1 | 1–2 August | Not mentioned | Not mentioned | The Hague | Free Foresters by 6 wickets |
| Match 2 | 3–4 August | Not mentioned | Not mentioned | Hilversum | Free Foresters by an innings and 1 run |
| Match 3 | 6–7 August | Not mentioned | Not mentioned | Haarlem | Match drawn |

== September ==
=== New Zealand in Wales ===
Three-day Match
| No. | Date | Home captain | Away captain | Venue | Result |
|---|---|---|---|---|---|
| Match | 9–12 July | Norman Riches | Tom Lowry | Llandudno Cricket Club Ground | Match drawn |
