= Arthur Jenkins =

Arthur Jenkins may refer to:

- Arthur Jenkins (musician) (1936–2009), American keyboardist, composer, arranger and percussionist
- Arthur Jenkins (British politician) (1884–1946), Welsh miners' leader and Member of Parliament for Pontypool
- Arthur Jenkins (Australian politician), member of the Western Australian Legislative Council
- Arthur G. Jenkins (1887–1963), Australian cricket umpire
