= Dave Gillespie (rugby union) =

New Zealand rugby union player (1934–2025)

- Born: William David Gillespie; 6 August 1934 Cromwell, New Zealand
- Died: 2025 (aged 90) Australia
- Height: 1.86 m (6 ft 1 in)
- Weight: 92 kg (203 lb)
- School: Waimate High School
- Notable relative: Charlie Oliver (father-in-law)

Rugby union career
- Position: Flanker
Provincial / State sides
Years	Team	Apps	(Points)
1954–1961	Otago	69	
1962–1963	Wellington	27	
International career
Years	Team	Apps	(Points)
1957–1960	New Zealand	1	

William David Gillespie (6 August 1934 – 2025) was a New Zealand rugby union player. He was a flanker.

Gillespie played 23 matches for New Zealand and toured Australia in 1957. He played one test, the third test against the Wallabies in 1958.

Born in Cromwell, Gillespie was educated at Waimate High School, and did not play rugby until he was 16. His father-in-law was All Black Charlie Oliver.

Gillespie died in Australia in 2025, at the age of 90.
