= Graham Vivian =

New Zealand cricketer

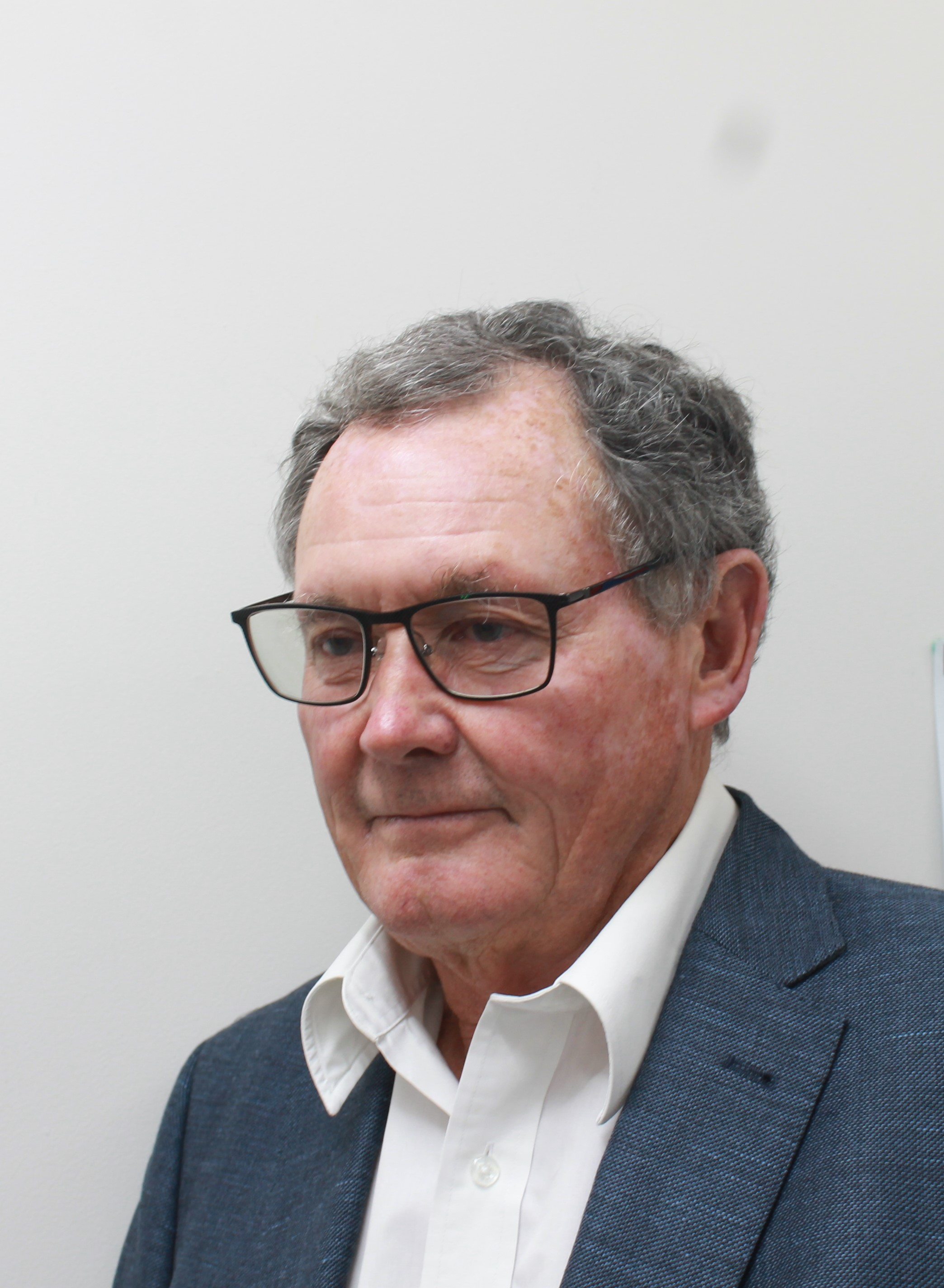
- Graham Vivian in 2023

Personal information
- Full name: Graham Ellery Vivian
- Born: 28 February 1946 (age 80); Auckland, New Zealand
- Batting: Left-handed
- Bowling: Right-arm leg break
- Relatives: Giff Vivian (father)

International information
- National side: New Zealand (1965–1973)
- Test debut (cap 109): 5 March 1965 v India
- Last Test: 20 April 1972 v West Indies
- Only ODI (cap 10): 11 February 1973 v Pakistan

Domestic team information
- Years: Team
- 1966/67–1978/79: Auckland

Career statistics
Competition	Test	ODI	FC	LA
Matches	5	1	88	17
Runs scored	110	14	3,259	433
Batting average	18.33	14.00	28.33	33.30
100s/50s	0/0	0/0	3/17	1/2
Top score	43	14	137*	126
Balls bowled	198	–	4,079	–
Wickets	1	–	56	–
Bowling average	107.00	–	38.00	–
5 wickets in innings	0	–	1	–
10 wickets in match	0	–	0	–
Best bowling	1/14	–	5/59	–
Catches/stumpings	3/–	0/–	41/–	2/–
- Source: Cricinfo, 22 April 2017

Graham Ellery Vivian (born 28 February 1946) is a former New Zealand cricketer who played in five Test matches and one One Day International (ODI) from 1965 to 1972. He made his Test match debut without previously playing in a first-class match. His father, Giff Vivian, played seven Tests for New Zealand in the 1930s. Both father and son were selected in New Zealand touring teams, in 1930 and 1965 respectively, at the age of 18.

Vivian became a successful businessman, establishing the synthetic-turf company Tiger Turf in 1981.

== Cricket career ==
After some fine performances as a leg-spinning all-rounder for the Auckland Under-20 side in the 1964-65 Brabin Tournament (23 wickets at 10.47 in three matches), Vivian was selected to tour India, Pakistan and England in 1965 with the national team. He played his first Test just after his nineteenth birthday, against India in Calcutta, without having played a first-class match. He made a useful 43 in the second innings, coming in when New Zealand were struggling at 103 for 7 and helping the side avoid defeat. On the England leg of the tour he played eight first-class matches but was unsuccessful with bat or ball, and did not play a Test.

He toured the West Indies in 1971–72 and played four Tests but without success. However, his fielding was outstanding: Henry Blofeld described the 1971-72 New Zealanders' fielding as "the most impressive I have ever seen from any side anywhere", and he singled out Vivian as "the best of all". He continued to play domestic cricket in New Zealand until 1978–79, but never played another Test.

Vivian's best first-class bowling figures were 5 for 59 for Auckland against Central Districts at Auckland in 1967–68. On a brief non-Test tour of Australia in 1969-70 he hit his highest first-class score (and first century) of 137 not out against Victoria in Melbourne, out of a New Zealand total of 220, having gone to the crease at 22 for 4.

== After cricket ==
Vivian worked for Coca-Cola from 1970 to 1981, becoming general manager for New Zealand. In 1981 he established a company, Tiger Turf, manufacturing synthetic turf for sports grounds. By 2007 its New Zealand factory was weaving 950,000 square metres of various kinds of turf a year. He sold the company in 2010.

He has been president of the Auckland Cricket Association, and is a life member of the Eden Park Trust and a life trustee of the Halberg Trust. As of 2024 he is a director of the New Zealand company Wood Engineering Technology.
