= Ron Talbot =

New Zealand cricketer (1903–1983)

Personal information
- Full name: Ronald Osmond Talbot
- Born: 26 November 1903; Christchurch, New Zealand
- Died: 5 January 1983 (aged 79); Auckland, New Zealand
- Batting: Right-handed
- Bowling: Right-arm medium
- Relatives: George Talbot (cousin)

Domestic team information
- Years: Team
- 1922/23–1932/33: Canterbury
- 1933/34–1935/36: Otago

Career statistics
Competition	First-class
Matches	51
Runs scored	1,946
Batting average	24.63
100s/50s	3/10
Top score	117
Balls bowled	4,201
Wickets	54
Bowling average	37.12
5 wickets in innings	1
10 wickets in match	0
Best bowling	5/106
Catches/stumpings	31/–
- Source: ESPNCricinfo, 27 February 2014

Ronald Osmond Talbot (26 November 1903 – 5 January 1983), was a New Zealand sportsman who played first-class cricket between the 1922–23 and 1935–36 seasons, and toured England with the national team in 1931. He also played representative rugby union for Canterbury.

Talbot was born at Christchurch in 1903 and educated at Christ's College in the city, where he captained the First XI cricket team and the First XV Rugby team.

A middle-order batsman and medium-pace bowler, Talbot made his first-class debut for Canterbury in a Plunket Shield match against Otago in January 1923, aged 19. He scored 105 in the first innings, the highest score in the match, and after not bowling in Otago's first innings, took 3 for 38 in the second. Canterbury won by 10 wickets, won Talbot's next match as well, and finished the 1922–23 season champions.

In 1925–26 he took 5 for 106 in 18 overs as Wellington made 494 for 9 on the first day, then made a pair when Wellington dismissed Canterbury cheaply twice on the second day. He did not make a fifty between his debut match and 1929–30, when he scored 50 and 113 in a narrow loss to Wellington. In 1930–31 he scored 182 runs at 30.33 and took six wickets at 32.33 to contribute to Canterbury's victory in the Plunket Shield and earn himself selection in the 14-man team to tour England in 1931.

In 24 first-class matches on the tour Talbot made 759 runs at 23.71 with four fifties and a highest score of 66, and took 17 wickets at 50.70. He was the only player not to appear in the Tests. Early in the tour he played a part in the victory over MCC at Lord's, when he made 66 in 50 minutes, "hitting half-volleys as if he hated them", and hitting one ball onto the top of the pavilion roof. Wisden reported that he had started the tour well, but "lost his punishing powers" as he "endeavoured to play a more correct game".

Opening the batting for Canterbury against Auckland in the first match of the 1932–33 season, Talbot made 55 and 117, his highest first-class score. He moved to Otago ahead of the 1933–34 season, playing four matches over the following three seasons, scoring 151 runs and taking four wickets.

Talbot also played squash, golf, bowls and athletics, and played representative rugby for Canterbury. He worked for the Phoenix Insurance Company. He and his wife Jennie had two daughters. He died at Auckland in January 1983 aged 79.
