= Norman Gallichan =

New Zealand cricketer

- Gallichan in 1937

Personal information
- Born: 3 June 1906; Palmerston North, New Zealand
- Died: 25 March 1969 (aged 62); Taupō, New Zealand
- Batting: Right-handed
- Bowling: Slow left-arm orthodox

International information
- National side: New Zealand (1937)
- Only Test (cap 33): 24 July 1937 v England

Domestic team information
- Years: Team
- 1929/30–1938/39: Wellington

Career statistics
Competition	Test	First-class
Matches	1	31
Runs scored	32	636
Batting average	16.00	18.17
100s/50s	0/0	0/3
Top score	30	62
Balls bowled	264	5559
Wickets	3	86
Bowling average	37.66	26.09
5 wickets in innings	0	4
10 wickets in match	0	1
Best bowling	3/99	6/46
Catches/stumpings	0/–	22/–
- Source: Cricinfo, 23 June 2009

Norman Gallichan (3 June 1906 – 25 March 1969) was a New Zealand cricketer who played first-class cricket for Wellington and one Test match for New Zealand.

== Cricket career ==
Gallichan was educated at Palmerston North High School. A tall slow-left-arm bowler and lower-order batsman, he played most of his cricket for Manawatu in the Hawke Cup competition, appearing irregularly in first-class cricket for Wellington between 1929–30 and 1938–39. After he took five wickets for Manawatu against the touring MCC in 1929–30, the English players Frank Woolley and K. S. Duleepsinhji singled him out as the best bowler in New Zealand.

Playing his only full season of Plunket Shield cricket in 1936–37, he took 10 wickets in three matches at an average of 23.50 and made 84 runs at 28.00, and he was a late selection for the 1937 New Zealand tour of England when it was decided to take 15 instead of 14 players. He did well in the early games, but was reckoned by Wisden to have been inconsistent. His one Test match came in the Second Test at Manchester, where he replaced the injured Alby Roberts. He took three wickets and scored 32 runs in two innings, but Roberts returned for the final Test of the three-match series.

His career-best innings figures came in the match against Scotland just before the Second Test, when he took 6 for 46 and 3 for 38 to help the New Zealanders to a narrow victory. His best match figures came near the end of the tour when he took 5 for 52 and 5 for 20 against Minor Counties in a more emphatic victory. On the tour as a whole he took 59 first-class wickets at an average of 23.94.

He played for Manawatu in the Hawke Cup from 1924–25 to 1946–47, taking 177 wickets at 11.59 and making 1409 runs at 32.76 in the challenge matches. Only Chester Holland, with 189 wickets, has taken more. In 1935–36, when Manawatu held the title throughout the season, Gallichan took 30 wickets in four matches at an average of only 6.66. In 2011 he was selected in the Hawke Cup Team of the Century.

== Death ==
Gallichan died in Taupō in 1969 and was buried at Taupo Public Cemetery.
