= Bill Cunningham (cricketer) =

New Zealand cricketer

Personal information
- Full name: William Henry Ranger Cunningham
- Born: 23 January 1900; Christchurch, New Zealand
- Died: 29 November 1984 (aged 84); Christchurch, New Zealand
- Batting: Right-handed
- Bowling: Right-arm medium-fast

Domestic team information
- Years: Team
- 1922/23–1930/31: Canterbury

Career statistics
Competition	First-class
Matches	32
Runs scored	396
Batting average	11.64
100s/50s	0/0
Top score	33 not out
Balls bowled	6,455
Wickets	91
Bowling average	34.30
5 wickets in innings	4
10 wickets in match	0
Best bowling	6/33
Catches/stumpings	8/–
- Source: CricketArchive, 15 May 2014

William Henry Ranger Cunningham (23 January 1900 – 29 November 1984) was a first-class cricketer in New Zealand from 1922 to 1931.

A right-arm opening bowler and lower-order batsman, Cunningham made his first-class debut for Canterbury in the 1922–23 season. He took 15 wickets at an average of 17.46 in the three-match Plunket Shield season to lead the national averages, with best figures of 5 for 72 (8 for 145 in the match) in the victory over Wellington.

In the first match of the 1924–25 season, Cunningham took 6 for 33 against Auckland (8 for 51 in the match) to help Canterbury to victory by 342 runs. In the first innings of the next match, against Wellington, he came to the wicket at 184 for 8 and hit 33 not out to take the Canterbury total to 290, then took 5 for 83 in the first innings. Canterbury won by 57 runs. He was selected to play for New Zealand in the match against Victoria later in the season.

Cunningham toured Australia with New Zealand in 1925-26, where he was New Zealand's most successful bowler, with 13 wickets in the four state matches. He took 14 wickets in the Plunket Shield in 1926-27 and was selected for the tour of England in 1927. In England, however, he completely lost form and confidence, taking only five wickets in seven matches. He played a few matches over subsequent seasons but never regained his old form.
