= Sonny Moloney =

New Zealand cricketer

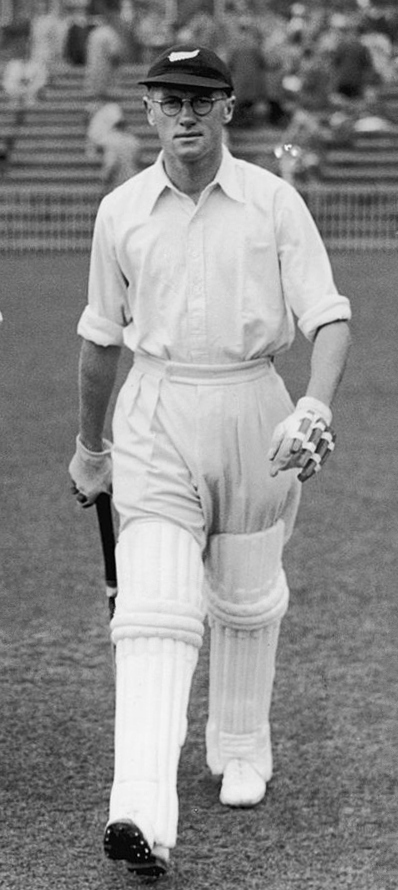
- Moloney in England in 1937

Personal information
- Full name: Denis Andrew Robert Moloney
- Born: 11 August 1910; Dunedin, Otago, New Zealand
- Died: 15 July 1942 (aged 31); El Alamein, British-occupied Egypt
- Batting: Right-handed
- Bowling: Legbreak

International information
- National side: New Zealand (1937)
- Test debut (cap 30): 26 June 1937 v England
- Last Test: 14 August 1937 v England

Domestic team information
- Years: Team
- 1929/30–1934/35: Otago
- 1935/36–1937/38: Wellington
- 1938/39–1939/40: Otago
- 1940/41: Canterbury

Career statistics
Competition	Test	First-class
Matches	3	64
Runs scored	156	3,219
Batting average	26.00	28.74
100s/50s	0/1	2/16
Top score	64	190
Balls bowled	12	5,176
Wickets	0	95
Bowling average	–	33.16
5 wickets in innings	–	3
10 wickets in match	–	0
Best bowling	–	5/23
Catches/stumpings	3/–	35/–
- Source: Cricinfo, 1 April 2017

Denis Andrew Robert "Sonny" Moloney (11 August 1910 – 15 July 1942) was a New Zealand cricketer who played three Test matches on New Zealand's 1937 tour of England. He died of his wounds after being captured at the First Battle of El Alamein during the Second World War.

Moloney was born at Dunedin and educated at Otago Boys' High School in the city, where he represented the school at cricket, rugby and athletics. A middle-order or opening batsman and leg-spin bowler, Sonny Moloney played first-class cricket in New Zealand from the 1929–30 season to 1940–41, playing for Otago, Wellington and Canterbury, as well as playing Hawke Cup cricket for Manawatu. His highest first-class score was 190, which he made opening Wellington's innings against Auckland in February 1937. His best bowling figures were 5 for 23 against Cambridge University three months later.

Moloney toured England with the New Zealand team in 1937, playing in all three Test matches. On his debut in the first Test at Lord's he scored 64 in the first innings, adding 104 for the eighth wicket with Alby Roberts. He was one of the most successful players on the tour, making 1,463 runs at an average of 34.83 and taking 57 wickets at a bowling average of 26.68 in 26 first-class matches. He captained New Zealand in the match against Sir Julien Cahn's XI in 1938–39.

Moloney was working as the chief clerk for the National Insurance Company in Dunedin when he enlisted to serve in the Second World War. He was a lieutenant in 20 Infantry Battalion at the time of his death at the age of 31 on Ruweisat Ridge during the First Battle of El Alamein. He was initially reported as missing in action before his death was confirmed in March 1943. He is buried at El Alamein War Cemetery. Wisden reported his death in the 1945 edition, giving a date of death as 1943.

A monograph titled 'Forgotten Skipper - Gallant Soldier: Sonny Moloney' written by Rob Franks was published in 2023.
