= Hector Gillespie =

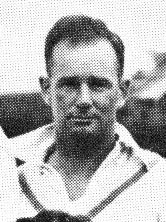
- Hector Gillespie in 1931

Personal information
- Full name: Hector Donald Gillespie
- Born: 29 May 1901; Auckland, New Zealand
- Died: 12 October 1954 (aged 53); Auckland, New Zealand
- Batting: Right-handed
- Role: Batsman

Domestic team information
- Years: Team
- 1920/21–1931/32: Auckland
- FC debut: 25 December 1920 Auckland v Hawke's Bay
- Last FC: 8 January 1932 Auckland v Caterbury

Career statistics
Competition	First-class
Matches	30
Runs scored	1,208
Batting average	23.23
100s/50s	1/6
Top score	183
Balls bowled	96
Wickets	2
Bowling average	35.50
5 wickets in innings	0
10 wickets in match	0
Best bowling	2/43
Catches/stumpings	20/–
- Source: CricketArchive, 8 October 2009

Hector Donald (or David) Gillespie (29 May 1901 – 12 October 1954) (Note: Wisden's obituary refers to him as Hector Donald Gillespie, While both CricInfo and CricketArchive list him as Hector David Gillespie, the Registrar-General's online website has Hector Donald Gillespie for his birth (27 May 1901) and death.) was a New Zealand cricketer who played first class cricket for Auckland and briefly for a pre-Test status New Zealand international side between 1920 and 1932 as a right-handed batsman.

== Life and career ==
Educated at Auckland Grammar School, Gillespie made 1,208 runs from his thirty first-class matches at 23.23, including one century – 183 against Canterbury in January 1930. He also made six half-centuries, and took two wickets for 35.50 with his occasional bowling. He toured Australia with the New Zealand team in 1925-26 but played in only one of the four first-class matches.

He captained Eden Cricket Club in Auckland for some years; in 1924–25 he shared a 441-run opening partnership with Jackie Mills for Eden against University. He was also an avid rugby player.

He went on to become a justice of the peace after a 38-year career in law.
