= Curly Page =

New Zealand sportsman (1902–1987)

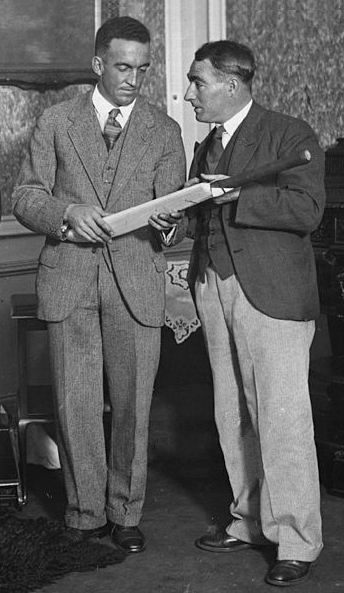
- Page (left) and Dempster in 1931
- Born: Milford Laurenson Page; 8 May 1902 Lyttelton, New Zealand
- Died: 13 February 1987 (aged 84) Christchurch, New Zealand
- Weight: 64 kg (141 lb)
- School: Christchurch Boys' High School
- Notable relative: Frederick Page (brother)

Rugby union career
- Position: Halfback
Provincial / State sides
Years	Team	Apps	(Points)
1922–23, 28–29	Canterbury	19	
International career
Years	Team	Apps	(Points)
1928	New Zealand	0	(0)
- Cricket career

Cricket information
- Batting: Right-handed
- Bowling: Right-arm slow

International information
- National side: New Zealand (1930–1937)
- Test debut (cap 10): 10 January 1930 v England
- Last Test: 14 August 1937 v England

Domestic team information
- Years: Team
- 1920/21–1936/37: Canterbury
- 1936/37: Canterbury and Otago
- 1942/43: South Island Army
- 1942/43: New Zealand Army

Career statistics
Competition	Test	First-class
Matches	14	132
Runs scored	492	5,857
Batting average	24.60	29.88
100s/50s	1/2	9/32
Top score	104	206
Balls bowled	379	4,622
Wickets	5	73
Bowling average	46.20	32.38
5 wickets in innings	0	0
10 wickets in match	0	0
Best bowling	2/21	4/10
Catches/stumpings	6/–	115/–
- Source: Cricinfo, 13 February 2017

Milford Laurenson "Curly" Page (8 May 1902 – 13 February 1987) was a New Zealand Test cricketer and rugby union player, who represented his country in both sports.

== Early life and family ==
Born in Lyttelton on 8 May 1902, Page was the son of Olga Marguerite Smith and her husband, David Joseph Page, a produce and coal merchant. He was educated at Christchurch Boys' High School where he was a champion all-round sportsman.

Page had one sister and two brothers, including Frederick Page who was a professor of music, pianist and music critic.

== Cricket ==
In a first-class career extending from 1920–21 to 1942–43, Page was New Zealand's second Test captain, and captained the side in seven of the Tests in which he played. He toured England in 1927, 1931 and 1937, and was captain of the team on the latter tour. He was the only player to appear in all 14 of New Zealand's Test matches before World War II.

He usually batted at number four or five, bowled useful slow-medium, and according to Dick Brittenden, his "slip fielding was magnificent, sometimes incredibly swift". His highest first-class score was 206, for Canterbury against Wellington in 1931–32, when he added 278 for the fourth wicket with Alby Roberts in the second innings after Canterbury had trailed by 277.

In the First Test at Lord's in 1931 he made 104 after New Zealand had trailed by 230 on the first innings. He added 118 for the third wicket with Stewie Dempster, then Page and Roger Blunt added 142 in 105 minutes for the fourth wicket.

== Rugby union ==
A halfback and first five-eighth, Page represented Canterbury at a provincial level in two stints: in 1922 and 1923, and then in 1928 and 1929. He played just one match for the New Zealand national side, the All Blacks, against the touring New South Wales team at Lancaster Park in 1928. He did not appear in any rugby Test matches.

== Death ==
Page died in Christchurch on 13 February 1987.

Sporting positions
Preceded by Tom Lowry	New Zealand national cricket captain 1931/2–1937	Succeeded by Walter Hadlee
