= Arthur G. Jenkins =

Australian cricket umpire (1887–1963)

Arthur Jenkins
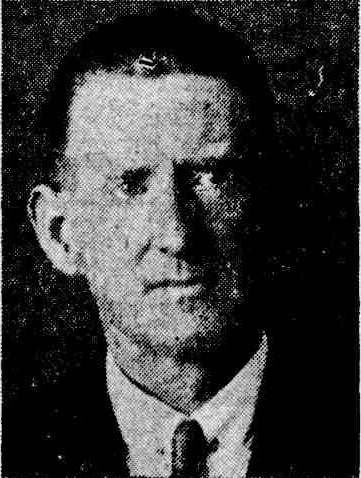

Personal information
- Full name: Arthur George Jenkins
- Born: 7 February 1887; Adelaide, South Australia
- Died: 21 May 1963 (aged 76); Adelaide, South Australia, Australia

Umpiring information
- Tests umpired: 1 (1930)
- FC umpired: 30 (1927–1939)
- Source: CricketArchive, 18 April 2015

Arthur George Jenkins (7 February 1887 – 19 May 1963) was a South Australian cricket Test match umpire.

== Early life ==
Jenkins was born at Woodville, South Australia on 7 February 1887.

He was the son of a butcher, William Jenkins, who died of tuberculosis in 1895, and Jemima "Mina" Patten. William came from Yealmpton, Devon, England, and arrived in Australia on 28 April 1858 on the Storm Cloud. Mina was born at Port Noarlunga, South Australia, on 26 May 1861. Her parents had travelled to Australia from Armagh, Ireland, aboard the Admiral Boxer on 21 August 1855.

Arthur Jenkins had a sister, Eleanor May (born 1883), and three brothers, Frederick Charles (1889–91), Stanley Robert (born 1893), and William Roy (born 1892). When the father died, the three surviving boys were farmed out to people who would take them.

He married Ethel Nellie Paget on 4 September 1912. They had four children, Ronald Arthur (1913-2003), Eileen Nellie (1914), Lorna Nellie (1916–98), and Joyce Gwenyth (1918-2010).

In his youth, Arthur Jenkins worked as an ironworker, but spent the last 33 years of his working life as a storeman.

== Career ==
As a boy, Jenkins was a mascot, drink waiter, boundary marker, and assistant scorer for Woodville Cricket Club.

He became an umpire in 1910 and was rewarded with the official fee of two shillings per afternoon. By 1933 he was lecturing junior umpires in the art of the role.

He umpired SACA matches well into his seventies, officiating in almost 800 games. Of those, some thirty were First Class matches, typically South Australia playing against Queensland, New South Wales, Victoria or Western Australia. Others included South Australia v. Marylebone Cricket Club (1928/29 and 1929/30), South Australia v. South Africans (1931), South Australia v. New Zealanders (1937), and Don Bradman's XI v. Vic Richardson's XI (1937).

Jenkins officiated at one Test match, the first between Australia and the West Indies, played at Adelaide from 12 December to 16 December 1930. The match was won by Australia by 10 wickets. Jenkins' colleague was George Hele.

== See also ==
- List of Test umpires
