= Giff Vivian =

New Zealand cricketer (1912–1983)

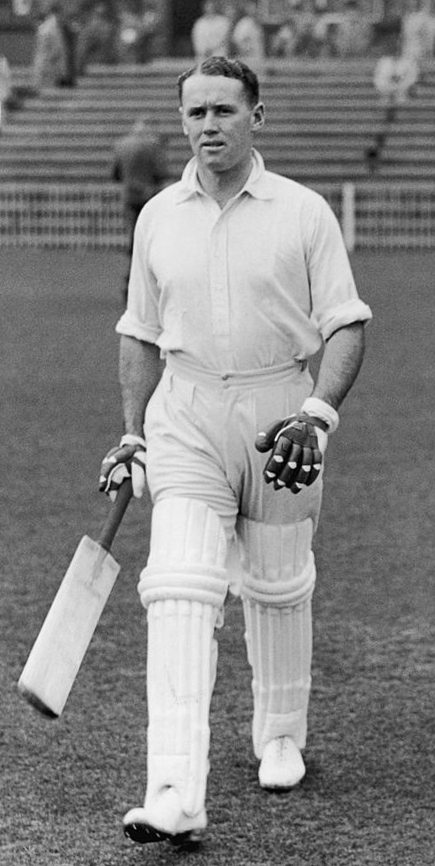
- Vivian in England in 1937

Personal information
- Full name: Henry Gifford Vivian
- Born: 4 November 1912; Auckland, New Zealand
- Died: 12 August 1983 (aged 70); Auckland, New Zealand
- Batting: Left-handed
- Bowling: Slow left-arm orthodox
- Relatives: Graham Vivian (son)

International information
- National side: New Zealand (1931–1937)
- Test debut (cap 20): 29 July 1931 v England
- Last Test: 14 August 1937 v England

Domestic team information
- Years: Team
- 1930/31–1938/39: Auckland

Career statistics
Competition	Test	First-class
Matches	7	85
Runs scored	421	4,443
Batting average	42.10	34.71
100s/50s	1/5	6/31
Top score	100	165
Balls bowled	1,311	6,165
Wickets	17	223
Bowling average	37.23	27.62
5 wickets in innings	0	12
10 wickets in match	0	2
Best bowling	4/58	6/49
Catches/stumpings	4/–	71/–
- Source: Cricinfo, 1 April 2017

Henry Gifford Vivian (4 November 1912 – 12 August 1983) was a New Zealand cricketer who played in seven Test matches between 1931 and 1937.

== Cricket career ==
After attending Mount Albert Grammar School in Auckland, Giff Vivian made his first-class debut for Auckland in December 1930 at the age of 18, scoring 37 and 81 against Canterbury. After two more games he was selected in the New Zealand team to tour England in 1931.

A forceful left-handed middle-order batsman and left-arm spin bowler, in 25 matches on the tour Vivian made 1002 runs at 30.36, with centuries against Oxford University (his first century, 135 out of a team total of 488 on the first day) and Yorkshire (101 on a turning wicket, with four sixes). He also took 64 wickets at 23.75, with a best return of 6 for 70 against Glamorgan. Still aged only 18, he played in the Second and Third Tests, making 51 on debut and taking four wickets in the two matches.

In the first match of the 1931–32 season Vivian scored 165 against Wellington out of an Auckland total of 285. In the next match he took 4 for 73 and 5 for 62 against Otago, and then 5 for 59 against Canterbury.

Vivian did not play in the First Test against South Africa later that season, but restored to the team for the Second Test he made 100 and 73 (top-scoring in each innings) and took four wickets. "The 1931–32 season," wrote Dick Brittenden, "supported those who claimed he was New Zealand's finest cricketer."

Vivian played the First Test against England in 1932–33 but was injured during the match and missed the Second Test. In the 1933–34 first-class season he made 263 runs at 52.60 and took 9 wickets at 22.33; in 1934–35, now captaining Auckland, he made 343 runs at 49.00. In 1935–36 he took 5 for 98 and 6 for 92, as well as scoring 60 and 19 not out, against Canterbury.

Vivian appeared in all five matches New Zealand played against strong MCC touring teams in 1935–36 and 1936–37, and was again selected to tour England in 1937, this time as vice-captain to Curly Page. He scored 1118 runs at 29.42 and took 49 wickets at 36.91, handicapped by a pulled leg muscle for much of the tour. Opening the innings, he scored 58 and 50 in the Second Test, and 57 in what turned out to be his last Test innings in the Third Test, as well as taking 8 wickets in the series.

In the three matches of the 1938–39 season Vivian scored 132 runs at 33.00 and took 21 wickets at 16.66, including 5 for 46 against Otago and 6 for 49 and 4 for 59 in his last match against Wellington (match figures of 58.4–21–108–10 in an innings victory that gave Auckland the Plunket Shield).

In 1960, when the Marylebone Cricket Club decided to award honorary life membership to distinguished former players and administrators from around the world, Vivian was one of the first seven New Zealanders so honoured.

== Outside cricket ==
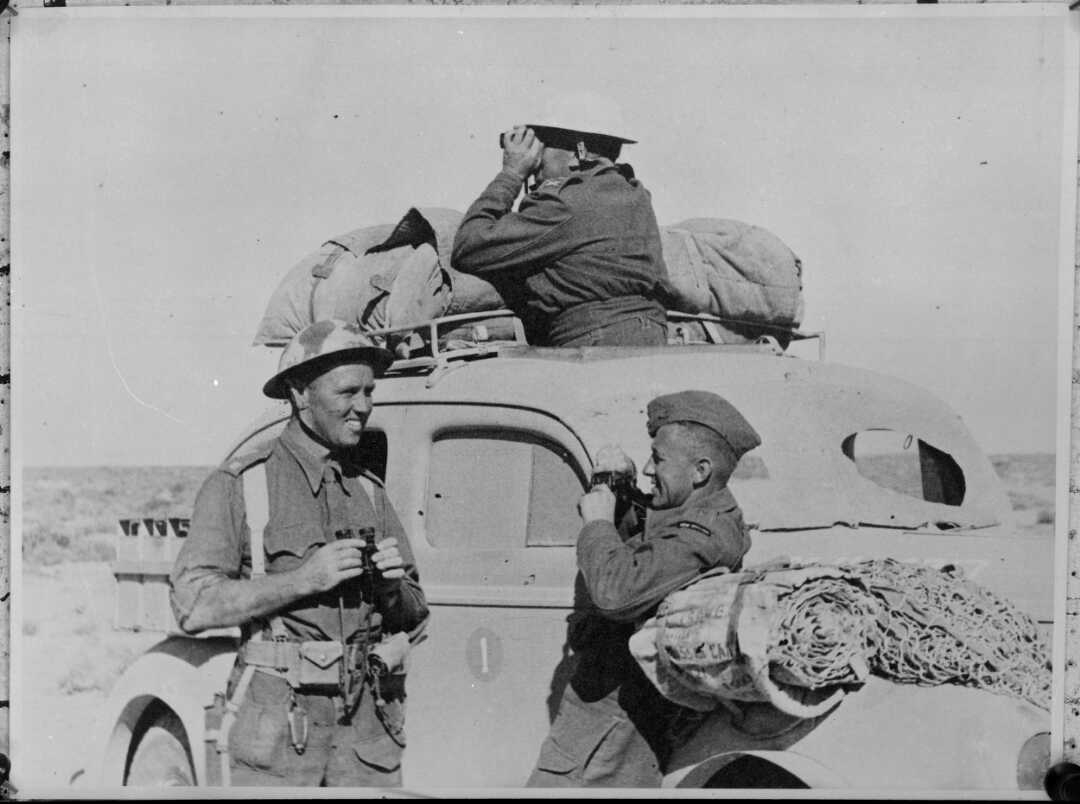
Lt Vivian (left) talks to Jack Griffiths while General Bernard Freyberg carries out reconnaissance (Libya, 1941)

Vivian, a keen amateur cinematographer, took extensive film of the 1937 tour of England. Copies of this film are held in the New Zealand Cricket Museum and in the Ngā Taonga Sound & Vision archive.

Vivian served as a lieutenant with the artillery of the New Zealand Expeditionary Force during the Second World War. Serving in the Middle East and Italy, and promoted to major, he was mentioned in dispatches, and returned to New Zealand in April 1945. After the war the demands of his business and the affliction of an injured back prevented his return to cricket. However, he served as a New Zealand selector for several years.

While serving overseas during the war Vivian met and married a fellow Aucklander, Peggy Robertson, who was serving in an army welfare corps. Their son Graham also played Test cricket for New Zealand.
