= Ian Cromb =

New Zealand cricketer (1905–1984)

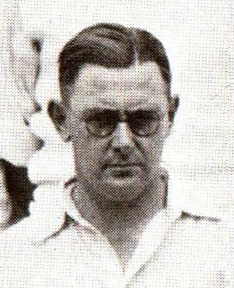
- Ian Cromb in 1936

Personal information
- Full name: Ian Burns Cromb
- Born: 25 June 1905; Christchurch, Canterbury, New Zealand
- Died: 6 March 1984 (aged 78); Christchurch, Canterbury, New Zealand
- Batting: Right-handed
- Bowling: Right-arm fast-medium, right-arm spin

International information
- National side: New Zealand (1931-1932)
- Test debut: 27 June 1931 v England
- Last Test: 4 March 1932 v South Africa

Career statistics
Competition	Test	First-class
Matches	5	88
Runs scored	123	3950
Batting average	20.50	29.04
100s/50s	0/1	3/24
Top score	51*	171
Balls bowled	960	13550
Wickets	8	222
Bowling average	55.25	27.71
5 wickets in innings	0	10
10 wickets in match	0	2
Best bowling	3/113	8/70
Catches/stumpings	1/–	103/–
- Source: Cricinfo, 1 April 2017

Ian Burns Cromb (25 June 1905 – 6 March 1984) was a New Zealand cricketer who played in five Tests from 1931 to 1932, including all three Tests of the 1931 tour of England.

Cromb was born in Christchurch and attended Christchurch Boys' High School. He was an all-rounder: an aggressive batsman and a fast-medium bowler in his younger days and a spin bowler later in his career. He played for Canterbury from 1929–30 to 1946–47, captaining the side from 1935–36 to 1937-38 and again from 1945–46 to 1946–47, and he also captained New Zealand in the four-match series against the visiting MCC in 1935–36. As a captain, he had a "penchant for the unexpected".

Cromb made his highest first-class score of 171 in Canterbury's innings victory over Wellington in the 1939–40 Plunket Shield, after taking five wickets in Wellington's first innings. His best bowling figures were 8 for 70 for the New Zealanders against Middlesex in 1931. Two weeks earlier he had taken 6 for 46 in the New Zealanders' innings victory over the MCC at Lord's. After he retired from playing he was a coach, administrator and selector. He served as president of the Canterbury Cricket Association in the 1970s.

In 1930 Cromb opened a sporting goods shop in Cashel Street, Christchurch, in partnership with his fellow Canterbury and New Zealand cricketer Bill Merritt. The shop was still operating under the same name in the 1990s.

Cromb was also a prominent golfer, winning the South Island championship and several Canterbury championships. He helped launch the career of the New Zealand champion golfer Bob Charles. Together they had a golfing tour of the United States and Great Britain between January and August 1958, Charles playing in several of the major tournaments.

Cromb married Valmai Kelly in Wellington in February 1935. She died in July 1956; they had a son and two daughters. Cromb died in a car accident in Christchurch in March 1984, aged 78.
