= Stewie Dempster =

New Zealand cricketer

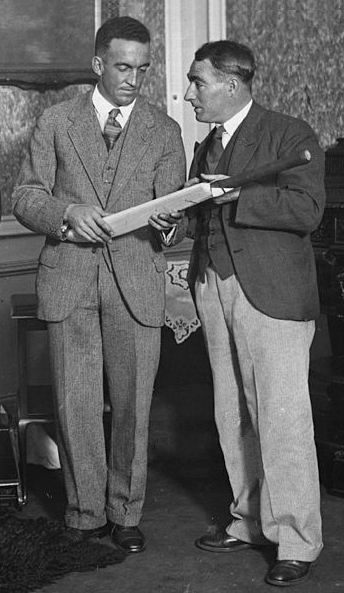
- Dempster (right) with Curly Page in 1931

Personal information
- Full name: Charles Stewart Dempster
- Born: 15 November 1903; Wellington, New Zealand
- Died: 14 February 1974 (aged 70); Wellington, New Zealand
- Batting: Right-handed
- Bowling: Right-arm slow

International information
- National side: New Zealand (1930–1933)
- Test debut (cap 3): 10 January 1930 v England
- Last Test: 31 March 1933 v England

Domestic team information
- Years: Team
- 1921/22–1947/48: Wellington
- 1935–1939: Leicestershire
- 1946: Warwickshire

Career statistics
Competition	Test	First-class
Matches	10	184
Runs scored	723	12,145
Batting average	65.72	44.98
100s/50s	2/5	35/55
Top score	136	212
Balls bowled	5	388
Wickets	0	8
Bowling average	–	37.50
5 wickets in innings	–	0
10 wickets in match	–	0
Best bowling	–	2/4
Catches/stumpings	2/–	94/2
- Source: Cricinfo, 22 August 2008

Charles Stewart Dempster (15 November 1903 – 14 February 1974) was a New Zealand Test cricketer and coach. As well as representing New Zealand, he also played for Wellington, Scotland, Leicestershire and Warwickshire.

== Early life ==
Born to a Scottish parents Charles Dempster and Eliza Jemima Weavers in 1903 Dempster lived the first three decades of his life in Wellington, nearby to the local cricket ground the Basin Reserve. Developing an early interest in the game Dempster played for the Wellington Boys' Institute team in his youth and was encouraged by his father to score hundreds, being rewarded with 5 shillings from him for each one he scored. In his most prolific season he scored nine centuries in ten innings with the remaining innings scoring 99 and gaining the attention of the local provincial selectors.

== Career in New Zealand ==
Dempster made his first first-class appearance for Wellington against Canterbury at the Basin Reserve over new year 1921/1922 scoring 10 and 1. Dempster first toured with New Zealand in 1927, when no Test matches were played, and headed the touring team's first-class batting averages. He was a surprise choice for the tour, being selected more for his performances in second-class cricket. In the 1929–30 MCC tour of New Zealand Dempster and Mills put on a New Zealand record first-innings stand of 276 for the first wicket, which remained the highest for New Zealand until 1972 . In the 1931 New Zealand tour of England he averaged 59.26 and scored 120 in the Test at Lord's. In 1932 he was listed as one of the Wisden Cricketers of the Year.

He made his final Test appearance against the 1932/33 England team scoring 83 not out.

== Move to England ==
Dempster moved to England, appearing in one first-class match for Lindsay Parkinson's XI in 1933 and once for Scotland in 1934. He settled in England from 1935, being contracted by the Leicestershire millionaire Sir Julien Cahn to play for his private team. Dempster qualified for Leicestershire, captaining the team from 1936 to 1938, although playing irregularly in 1938 and 1939. In 1938–39, he toured New Zealand with Cahn's team.

He was able to play county cricket as an amateur, and was therefore acceptable as a county captain, by being employed by Cahn, ostensibly as the manager of one of his furniture stores in Leicester. While there, he married Margaret Jowers from Leicester in 1938.

== Post-war life ==
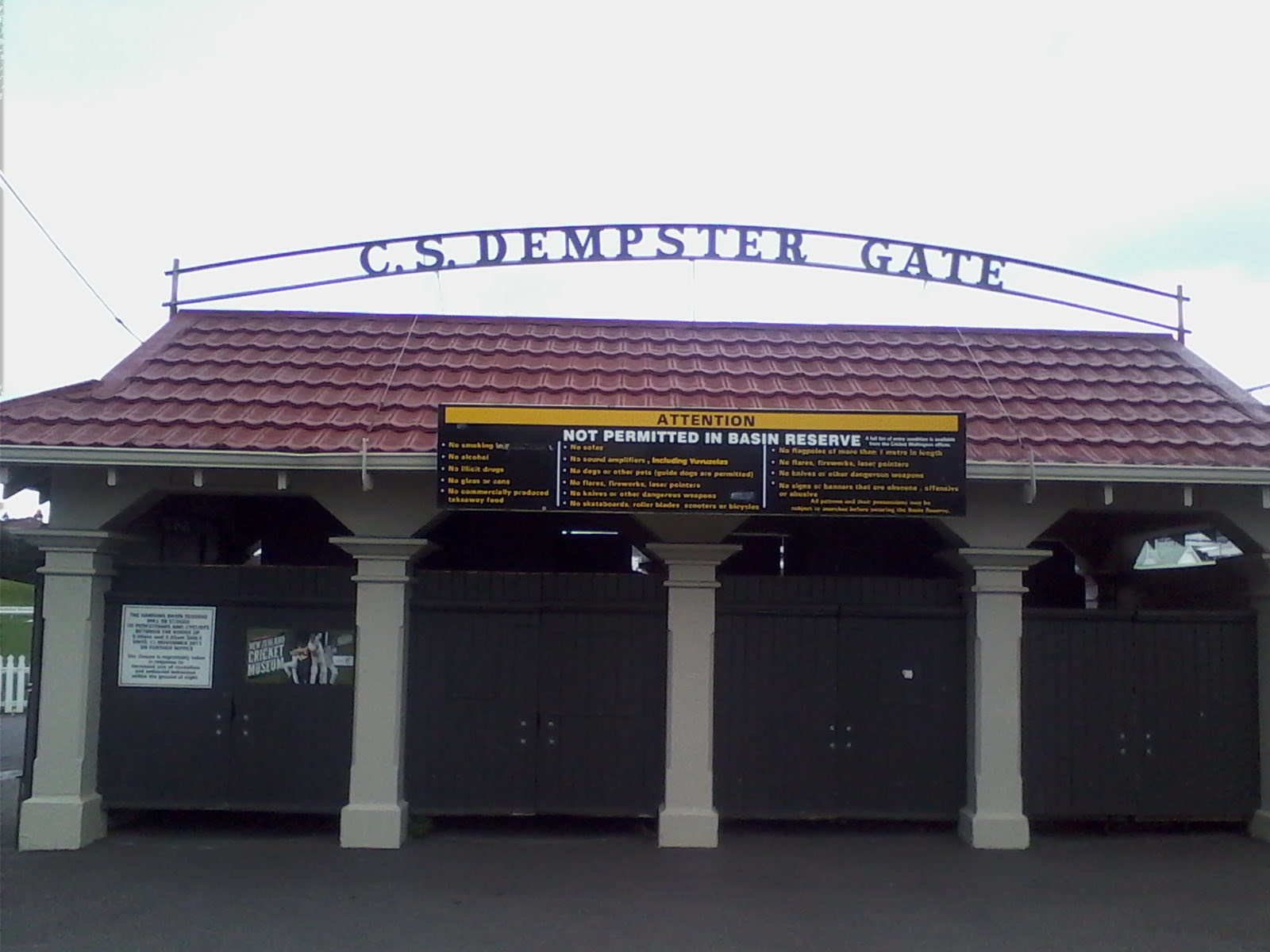
The C.S. Dempster gate to the Basin Reserve, Wellington.

Dempster appeared for the County scratch teams during the war but left the staff when the war ended. He played three times for Warwickshire in 1946 before returning to New Zealand to become a coach. He was selected to play for New Zealand in a one-off Test in Christchurch against England in March 1947, but he withdrew due to an eye injury four days before the match. The match ended in a draw. Dempster made his final appearance for Wellington against Auckland at Eden Park in January 1948 scoring 7 and 41.

Dempster has the distinction of having the second-highest Test batting average in history for completed careers of 10 or more innings, behind Sir Donald Bradman.

After his retirement from playing, he was a prominent coach in Wellington for many years. His pupils included the Test players Bruce Edgar and Ian Smith.

Wesley Harte wrote C.S. Dempster: His Record-By-Innings in 1990. A biography titled Second Only to Bradman: The Life of Stewie Dempster was written by Bill Francis and published in 2019.
