= Alby Roberts =

New Zealand cricketer (1909–1978)

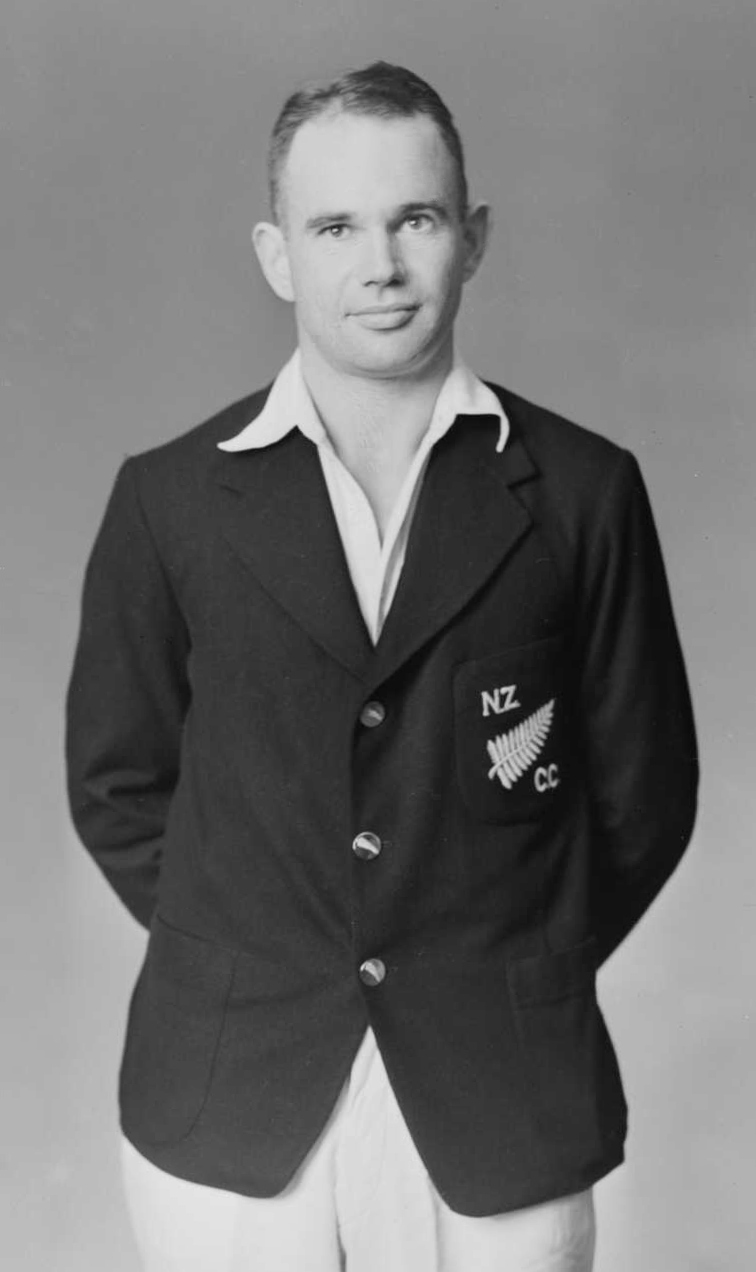
- Roberts in 1937

Personal information
- Full name: Albert William Roberts
- Born: 20 August 1909; Christchurch, Canterbury, New Zealand
- Died: 13 May 1978 (aged 68); Clyde, Otago, New Zealand
- Batting: Right-handed
- Bowling: Right-arm medium

International information
- National side: New Zealand (1930–1937)
- Test debut (cap 11): 10 January 1930 v England
- Last Test: 14 August 1937 v England

Domestic team information
- Years: Team
- 1927/28–1940/41: Canterbury
- 1944/45–1950/51: Otago

Career statistics
Competition	Test	First-class
Matches	5	84
Runs scored	248	3,645
Batting average	27.55	30.88
100s/50s	0/3	3/28
Top score	66*	181
Balls bowled	459	13,544
Wickets	7	167
Bowling average	29.85	28.51
5 wickets in innings	0	3
10 wickets in match	0	0
Best bowling	4/101	5/47
Catches/stumpings	4/–	78/–
- Source: Cricinfo, 1 April 2017

Albert William Roberts (20 August 1909 – 13 May 1978) was a New Zealand Test cricketer who played in five Test matches between 1930 and 1937.

== Career as a batsman ==
Roberts made his first-class debut in 1927–28 at the age of 18 as a middle-order batsman for Canterbury. In 1929–30 he made 38 (top score) and 23 against the touring MCC, then after making 54, 70, 76 and 24 not out in his next two matches he was selected for New Zealand's first Test. However, he made only 3 and 5 and was one of several players left out of the side for the next Test.

He scored his first century in 1930–31 against Wellington, when his 116 helped turn a 127-run first-innings deficit into a 139-run victory. In the 1931–32 Plunket Shield season he scored 378 runs at 75.60, including 181 in 260 minutes against Wellington, when he added 278 in 220 minutes for the fourth wicket with Curly Page. The partnership set a new record for any wicket in the Plunket Shield. Roberts played in both Tests against South Africa at the end of the season, making 54 in the First Test.

He also played rugby union for Canterbury.

== Career as an all-rounder ==
Roberts' form fell away in 1932–33 and he did not play in the Tests against England. He spent the 1933 English season playing as a professional for Church in the Lancashire League, scoring 615 runs at 26.73 and taking 59 wickets with his medium-pace bowling at 14.72. Thereafter he played as an all-rounder. In 1935–36 he played in three of the four (non-Test) matches for New Zealand against the touring MCC side, batting at seven or eight and opening the bowling. In the match in Wellington he made the top score of 75 not out, then took 3 for 33 and 3 for 39 as MCC narrowly avoided defeat.

He toured England in 1937, making 510 runs at 24.28 and taking 62 wickets at 26.20. In the Tests he led the batting averages with 142 runs at 47.33, with a top score of 66 not out in the First Test, and took seven wickets at 29.85. He missed the second of the three Tests with a shoulder injury. Wisden described him as "an extremely useful member of the side, especially as he was a brilliant slip. Moreover he had a way of getting runs when they were wanted".

Playing for Riccarton in senior Christchurch cricket in March 1938, Roberts scored 214 not out in a little over two hours, with 10 sixes and 24 fours. He continued to play for Canterbury, then after World War II he played for Otago, continuing until the age of 41. He scored his third and last first-class century against Canterbury in 1946–47, when he saved the match for Otago with 44 and 110 not out. At the time of his retirement he held the record for the number of Plunket Shield matches played: 44.

== Assessment ==
In his book New Zealand Cricketers, the New Zealand cricket writer Dick Brittenden called Roberts a "diverting mass of contradictions": "He took his magnificent athletic slip catches, he could hit with primitive force, and when he bowled, his out-swinger whipped away like a live thing. Yet he always looked tired, half asleep, absolutely casual and relaxed."

== Personal life ==
On 11 January 1939 Roberts married Jean McLeod at St Paul's Church, Christchurch.
