= Tom Lowry =

New Zealand cricketer (1898–1976)

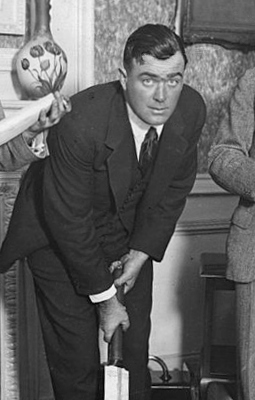
- Lowry in 1931

Personal information
- Full name: Thomas Coleman Lowry
- Born: 17 February 1898; Fernhill, Hawke's Bay, New Zealand
- Died: 20 July 1976 (aged 78); Hastings, New Zealand
- Batting: Right-handed
- Bowling: Right-arm medium
- Role: All-rounder, wicket-keeper

International information
- National side: New Zealand (1930–1931)
- Test debut (cap 8): 10 January 1930 v England
- Last Test: 15 August 1931 v England

Domestic team information
- Years: Team
- 1917/18: Auckland
- 1921–1924: Somerset
- 1921–1924: Cambridge University
- 1926/27–1932/33: Wellington

Career statistics
Competition	Test	First-class
Matches	7	198
Runs scored	223	9,421
Batting average	27.87	31.19
100s/50s	0/2	18/47
Top score	80	181
Balls bowled	12	3,003
Wickets	0	49
Bowling average	–	27.00
5 wickets in innings	–	0
10 wickets in match	–	0
Best bowling	–	4/14
Catches/stumpings	8/–	188/49
- Source: Cricinfo, 11 April 2017

Thomas Coleman Lowry (17 February 1898 – 20 July 1976) was a New Zealand international cricketer. He was New Zealand's first Test captain, and led the team in their first seven Test matches between January 1930 and August 1931. He played first-class cricket from 1918 to 1937. He was a farmer and racehorse breeder in Hawke's Bay, who served as president of the New Zealand Thoroughbred Breeders Association from 1951 to 1965.

== Lowry family ==
Lowry's father, Thomas Henry Lowry, a graduate of Cambridge University, inherited the Lowry property, Okawa, of 20,000 acres, in the Hawke's Bay region of the North Island. He married Helen ("Marsie") Watt, daughter of James Watt, "one of the richest men in New Zealand", in 1897. He was a keen cricketer, who played one first-class match for Hawke's Bay and constructed a cricket ground, "The Grove", on his property, which is still in use. He helped the Hawke's Bay Cricket Association bring out leading English professionals, including Albert Trott and Jack Board, to coach local players. He also developed the Lowry property, which had been largely a sheep and cattle farm, into one of New Zealand's leading racehorse studs. His most prominent success was the mare Desert Gold, who won her first 19 races and finished with 36 wins from 59 starts.

Thomas Henry and Marsie had five children between 1898 and 1904: Tom, Jim (who won a tennis Blue at Cambridge University before returning to run part of Okawa), Ralph (Rugby union Blue at Cambridge, another Lowry farmer, and the author of the book Taihape, Be Happy, Die Happy), Gertrude (known as "Beet") (who married Tom's Cambridge University friend Percy Chapman, who captained the English Test cricket team) and Marion (who married Reg Bettington, Oxford University cricket captain and later medical specialist in New Zealand).

== Early life ==
Lowry was educated at home until he was 10, when he was enrolled at Heretaunga School for boys in Hastings, where he received cricket coaching from Jack Board. He moved to his father's old school, Christ's College in Christchurch, in 1912. There he captained the cricket first XI in 1915 and 1916 and the Rugby first XV in 1916, as well as winning the school's heavyweight boxing title. His cricket coaches at Christ's College were three New Zealand representatives, James Lawrence, Harold Lusk and Tom Carlton. He also won prizes for Greek, Latin and English.

Aiming to join the Royal Flying Corps during the First World War, Lowry learned to fly in Auckland in 1917 and 1918. He then went to England, and was commissioned as a second lieutenant in the Royal Air Force in February 1919, three months after the end of the war.

== Cambridge University and early cricket career ==
While in Auckland, Lowry played club cricket and was selected to play for Auckland against Wellington in January 1918 as a wicket-keeper. Auckland lost, but Lowry scored 28 and 10 (only one Auckland player scored more) and made two catches and a stumping.

He stayed in England after being demobilised. His family arrived in England in 1920 in order that the three boys should go to Cambridge and the two girls to finishing school. Before starting his first term at Jesus College, Cambridge, Lowry toured North America with the Incogniti cricket team in August and September 1920, a team that included the 19-year-old Douglas Jardine.

Despite his clear cricketing skills, Lowry struggled to establish himself in what was then an excellent first-class team in his first two years at Cambridge, and did not earn his Blue. He did, however, play some games for Somerset, although his qualification to do so was obscure. The story is told that his birthplace was said to be Wellington, without mentioning that it was not the Somerset market town but the city in New Zealand; in fact, this was how Somerset had skirted the regulations for Peter Randall Johnson before World War I.

In 1922–23 Lowry was selected to tour with Archie MacLaren's MCC team to Australia and New Zealand. In the three matches against New Zealand he made 54, 61, 13 and 130, his first century in first-class cricket, in 167 minutes. In 1923 he began the season by scoring 161 in 170 minutes for Cambridge University against Lancashire, finally clinching his place in the university team. In his most productive season, playing for Cambridge, Somerset, and the Gentlemen at Lord's, he scored 1564 runs at an average of 35.54.

Lowry was captain of Cambridge in 1924, leading them to victory in the annual match against Oxford University at Lord's. Digby Jephson wrote of his captaincy: "There was no fuss – no needless shifting of a well-placed field, no hesitation. One could feel in the pavilion the strong magnetic influence of one man over ten." He again toured North America with the Incogniti after the English season.

Although Lowry achieved his BA degree in history, he was more interested in the extracurricular activities that Cambridge University life offered than in study. He used to employ a cramming tutor in third term to make up for the work he had not done in first and second terms.

== Return to New Zealand ==
The family returned to New Zealand late in 1924, all three brothers having got their Cambridge degrees. Tom bought two farms, of 2700 acres and 6000 acres, not far from Okawa, which he farmed until 1944, when his father died and Tom inherited Okawa.

Playing in a local cricket match for Moawhango against Taihape in December 1924 Lowry took 9 for 6, including four wickets in successive balls. Although he had played no first-class cricket in the 1924–25 season, Lowry was selected in the New Zealand team that toured Australia in 1925–26. He played in all four first-class matches, and scored 123 against South Australia in only 90 minutes.

The New Zealand Cricket Council decided to send a team for a full-season tour of England in 1927. Lowry at last made his Plunket Shield debut in 1926–27, playing for Wellington, and finished at the top of the Shield averages with 257 runs at 64.25. Although he was not captain of Wellington, he was selected to captain the New Zealand team on its most important tour so far.

== Tour of England, 1927 ==
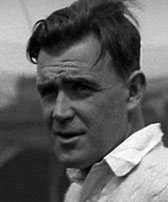
Lowry in England in 1927

The first first-class match of the 1927 tour was against the MCC at Lord's. In a high-scoring draw, Lowry scored 106 and 63 not out. The first victory came in the sixth match, when Lowry scored 105 "at a run-a-minute" and the New Zealanders easily beat Sussex.

Six players, including Lowry, scored over 1000 runs on the tour. Lowry came third in both aggregates and averages, with 1277 runs at 38.69. While the team's batting performed well, the bowling, apart from the leg-spinners Bill Merritt and Roger Blunt, was often ineffective. Lowry used frequent bowling changes in order to unsettle the batsmen. Although he was the team's reserve wicket-keeper, he often brought himself on for a few overs of his medium pace. His specialty was a surprise full toss at the batsman's chest. He took 15 wickets on the tour as well as making 20 catches and five stumpings.

The team played 26 first-class matches, winning seven, losing five and drawing 14.

== Test captain ==
In 1927–28 Lowry scored 317 runs at 63.40 in the Plunket Shield, coming second in the national aggregates and averages and helping Wellington to the championship. In the last match of the competition he made 181, his highest score, in a 276-run victory over Auckland. He captained New Zealand in the two representative matches against the touring Australian team in 1927–28. He took over the captaincy of Wellington in 1928–29, scoring 251 runs at 50.20, and leading the team to second place. In the lead-up to New Zealand's first Test series against England in 1929–30 he led Wellington to victory in the Plunket Shield, scoring 255 runs at 42.50.

In the First Test Lowry was out for a second-ball duck in the first innings, but top-scored in the second with 40, the last batsman out as New Zealand tried unsuccessfully to set England a challenging target. The other three Tests were drawn. Lowry again top-scored in the Fourth Test, scoring 80 and adding 100 for the seventh wicket with Herb McGirr to take the team to safety.

Lowry scored 272 runs at 47.33 in the 1930–31 Plunket Shield, but Wellington finished third.

== Tour of England, 1931 ==
Lowry was appointed to captain the New Zealand team to tour England in 1931. At a time of financial difficulty for New Zealand cricket he was also asked to manage the team, and was given only 14 players for the four-month tour.

Early in the tour the New Zealanders beat a strong MCC team by an innings. New Zealand batted first, Lowry scoring a brisk century. Rain allowed only 106 overs on the first two days, and Lowry declared before the third and final day began. Ian Cromb then took 6 for 46 with his pace bowling to dismiss MCC for 132, but when Lowry enforced the follow-on with only 170 minutes of play left, he gave the ball instead to the leg-spinner Bill Merritt, who proceeded to take 7 for 28 in nine overs and dismiss MCC for 48.

The only scheduled Test resulted in a high-scoring and close-fought draw after Lowry declared New Zealand's second innings. In response to public demand the English cricket authorities added two more Tests. In the Second Test, however, the New Zealanders were overwhelmed by an innings. Lowry top-scored in the first innings with a defiant 62 on a difficult wicket, an innings which the New Zealand journalist Budge Hintz described as "an exhibition of pluck and determination as inspiring as the game can provide". The Third Test was washed out after only three hours' play. It was Lowry's last Test.

In the tour overall Lowry scored 1290 runs at 31.46, coming fourth in both aggregates and averages, made 29 catches and six stumpings, as well as taking 15 wickets at 18.26 with what Wisden called "his weird bowling theories".

After the tour, Pelham Warner said Lowry was "the best skipper to tour England since the Australian Monty Noble in 1909". R.C. Robertson-Glasgow said Lowry was "a remarkable cricketer, strong, versatile, courageous, original, and a leader in a thousand".

== After Test cricket ==
Lowry announced his retirement from international cricket after the tour. He led Wellington to another Plunket Shield victory in 1931–32 but made only 53 runs himself in three matches. He captained Wellington twice more in 1932–33, then retired.

In 1933 Lowry married a neighbour, Margot Russell, one of three daughters of General Sir Andrew Hamilton Russell, the commander of the New Zealand Division in World War I. They had two girls and two boys: Ann (born in 1934), Tom (1936), Pat (1938) and Carol (1943).

Lowry continued to play club cricket. In a minor match in Taihape in December 1933 his team needed 69 runs to win in 18 minutes, and they won by 10 wickets, Lowry scoring 67 not out. In 1935–36 he captained Rangitikei in a Hawke Cup match, top-scoring in both innings. He was asked to manage the 1937 team to tour England, doubling as reserve wicket-keeper. Margot travelled with him. While on tour they were invited to attend the coronation of George VI in Westminster Abbey. In 12 matches Lowry scored 409 runs at 27.26 and made eight catches and 12 stumpings. He scored his last first-class century, 121, with 18 fours and a six, against Nottinghamshire.

Lowry later served as president of the New Zealand Cricket Council between 1950 and 1953. In 1953, he was awarded the Queen Elizabeth II Coronation Medal.

Jack Phillipps, a New Zealand cricket administrator from the 1920s to the 1960s, said Lowry was New Zealand's best captain in that period: "If you put 11 players through a gate on to a cricket field and Tom Lowry was one of them, I think most people would say, 'Well, there's the skipper.' He had that sort of air of command about him."

In 1996, Lowry was inducted into the New Zealand Sports Hall of Fame.

== Horse breeding and racing ==
Having been too young to fight in World War I, Lowry tried to enlist in the army at the outbreak of World War II but at 41 he was rejected on physical grounds. In 1942 he inherited the 80,000-acre Darr River Downs station near Longreach in Queensland.

When Lowry took over Okawa in 1944 he carried on the racehorse stud that his father had developed. He imported the stallion Faux Tirage from England at a cost of 25,000 pounds. Among Faux Tirage's progeny was Straight Draw, which won the 1957 Melbourne Cup. Lowry liked single-syllable names for his horses: three of his most successful horses were Key, Mop and Game. Game won 26 races, and Key won 19 as a three-year-old. Other prominent Lowry horses included Froth, Rover, Humber, Knave and Hot Drop.

Lowry helped to form the New Zealand Thoroughbred Breeders Association in 1948 and served as its president from 1951 to 1965.

Since Tom Lowry's death Okawa has been run by his son Tom, and grandson, also Tom. Since its founding the property has been run by five generations of Tom Lowrys.

== Cited sources ==
- Francis, Bill (2010). Tom Lowry: Leader in a Thousand. Trio Books. ISBN 978-0-9582839-8-4.

Sporting positions
First	New Zealand national cricket captain 1929/30-1931	Succeeded by Curly Page
