= James Shepherd (New Zealand cricketer) =

New Zealand cricketer (1892–1970)

Personal information
- Full name: James Stevens Fraser Shepherd
- Born: 29 February 1892; Reefton, Buller District, West Coast, New Zealand
- Died: 11 July 1970 (aged 78); Dunedin, Otago, New Zealand
- Batting: Right-handed

Domestic team information
- Years: Team
- 1912/13–1930/31: Otago

Career statistics
Competition	First-class
Matches	29
Runs scored	1,686
Batting average	30.65
100s/50s	1/10
Top score	146
Balls bowled	1,547
Wickets	21
Bowling average	37.00
5 wickets in innings	0
10 wickets in match	0
Best bowling	3/19
Catches/stumpings	9/–
- Source: CricketArchive, 24 April 2014

James Stevens Fraser Shepherd (29 February 1892 – 11 July 1970) was a New Zealand cricketer who played first-class cricket for Otago from the 1912–13 season to 1930–31. He played five times for New Zealand in the days before New Zealand played Test cricket.

Shepherd was born at Reefton in the Buller District of New Zealand's West Coast Region in 1892. He made his representative debut for Otago against Canterbury in March 1913, making scores of eight and 16 runs and failing to take a wicket in the four overs he bowled in the match. Although he played two matches for the province during the 1914–15 season, almost all of Shepherd's first-class cricket was played in the years after World War I.

During the war Shepherd, who in civilian life worked as a warehouseman for JE Butler Limited in Dunedin, enlisted in the New Zealand Field Artillery, serving as a gunner between 1916 and 1919. He saw active service with 11 battery on the Western Front during 1917 and 1918.

Following his war service Shepherd returned to Dunedin where he lived with his wife. He played twice for New Zealand against the touring Australians in 1920–21 and three times against England in 1922–23. In a total of 29 first-class matches he scored 1,685 runs and took 21 wickets.

Shepherd died at Dunedin in 1970 at the age of 78. An obituary was published in that year's New Zealand Cricket Almanack.
