= Reginald Hollingdale (cricketer) =

Scottish cricketer

Reginald Allen Hollingdale (6 March 1906 – 3 August 1989) was a Scottish cricketer active from 1925 to 1938 who played for Sussex. He was born in Burgess Hill and died in Edinburgh. He appeared in 79 first-class matches as a righthanded batsman who bowled right arm fast medium. He scored 1,071 runs with a highest score of 57 and took 84 wickets with a best performance of five for 23.
