= Ken James (cricketer) =

New Zealand cricketer (1904–1976)

- James in 1934

Personal information
- Full name: Kenneth Cecil James
- Born: 12 March 1904; Wellington, New Zealand
- Died: 21 August 1976 (aged 72); Palmerston North, New Zealand
- Batting: Right-handed
- Role: Wicketkeeper-batsman

International information
- National side: New Zealand (1930–1933)
- Test debut (cap 7): 10 January 1930 v England
- Last Test: 31 March 1933 v England

Career statistics
Competition	Test	First-class
Matches	11	205
Runs scored	52	6,413
Batting average	4.72	22.19
100s/50s	0/0	7/23
Top score	14	109*
Catches/stumpings	11/5	311/112
- Source: Cricinfo, 11 April 2017

Kenneth Cecil James (12 March 1904 – 21 August 1976), was a New Zealand Test cricketer who played for Wellington and Northamptonshire. He also served in New Zealand's Royal Air Force during second World War.

== Early career ==
A wicket-keeper and a useful batsman, James first played for Wellington in 1923 and toured England with the first New Zealand touring party in 1927 ostensibly as second string to Tom Lowry. But he quickly made the wicket-keeping position his own, with 85 dismissals on the tour, including eight at Derby. His understanding of the spin of Bill Merritt, the touring team's most successful bowler, was especially noted. No Test matches were played on the 1927 tour.

James was first-choice wicket-keeper for New Zealand's first Test matches in 1929–30 against England, and again on the tour of England in 1931, and in the home series against South Africa in 1931–32 and against England the following season. In 11 Tests he made 16 dismissals ( 11 Catches and 5 stumps)but failed completely as a batsman, scoring only 52 runs in total with an average of just 4.72 . However, he was the highest scorer in the Plunket Shield in 1932–33, with 269 runs at an average of 44.83.

== Later career ==
James then left New Zealand for England to qualify by residence as a county player for Northamptonshire, becoming the regular wicket-keeper from 1936 to 1939 and being joined there by Merritt. For a very weak county – Northamptonshire failed to win a single match for four years from May 1935 – James was notable not only for his wicket-keeping but also increasingly as a batsman, and in 1938, he scored more than 1,000 runs and made two centuries.

James served in the Royal New Zealand Air Force during the Second World War. He returned to New Zealand, where he played one more first-class match, captaining Wellington against Auckland in the 1946-47 Plunket Shield just before his 43rd birthday. He later played a few matches in the Hawke Cup for Hutt Valley, taking part in the match in 1948–49 in which they won the title for the first time.

He retired from cricket to run a public house. He died at Palmerston North.
