= New Zealand cricket team in England in 1927 =

Historic New Zealand sports team

The New Zealand cricket team toured England in the 1927 season. The team contained many of the players who would later play Test cricket for New Zealand, but the tour did not include any Test matches and the 1927 English cricket season was the last, apart from the Second World War years and the cancelled South African tour of 1970, in which there was no Test cricket in England.

== Background ==
In 1926, the Imperial Cricket Conference, forerunner of the International Cricket Council, allowed for the first time delegates from India, New Zealand and the West Indies to attend. The three were invited to organise themselves into cricket boards that could, in future, select representative teams to take part in Test matches, which had hitherto been restricted to sides from England, Australia and South Africa.

A non-Test playing visit from a side from New Zealand had already been arranged for the 1927 season, paid for by a private finance deal involving the sale of £1 shares, and it was agreed that this tour should go ahead without Test matches before a decision was taken on whether New Zealand was ready for Test cricket. In the event, the 1927 side did well enough to get an official (though scarcely full-strength) MCC tour agreed for 1929–30, in which the first New Zealand Tests were played. And future New Zealand tours of England, from 1931 onwards, were full Test match tours.

== New Zealand squad ==
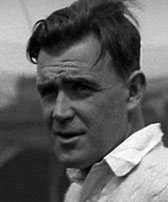
The team's captain, Tom Lowry, during the 1927 tour

The team was captained by Tom Lowry, who had played first-class cricket in England for Somerset and Cambridge University. In all, 17 players were used, but three of them only played once, and 10 cricketers played in 20 or more of the 26 first-class matches.

The 14 players who made up the regular side were:

- Tom Lowry (captain)
- Cyril Allcott
- Ernest Bernau
- Roger Blunt
- Bill Cunningham
- Ces Dacre
- Stewie Dempster
- Matt Henderson
- Kenneth James, wicketkeeper
- Herb McGirr
- Bill Merritt
- John Mills
- Charlie Oliver
- Curly Page

The three who played just one game each were:

- Denis Blundell, later governor-general of New Zealand, a Cambridge undergraduate who failed to get into the university side for any first-class matches in 1927 (though he did in 1928 and 1929)
- Ronald Fox, a 47-year-old wicketkeeper whose main first-class cricket experience had been for MCC on a tour of New Zealand in 1906–07 and whose previous first-class match had been for MCC in 1910
- Douglas Hay, the tour manager, aged 50, whose previous game was more than 20 years earlier, for Auckland against the MCC 1906–07 side, when he was stumped by Fox.

James was originally selected as second wicketkeeper, but made such a strong impression that he played in almost every match; only in some minor matches did Lowry deputise for James as wicketkeeper. Of the 14 regulars, only Bernau, Cunningham, Dacre and Oliver did not go on to play Test cricket; of the irregulars, Blundell came closest to Test cricket, representing New Zealand against MCC on an unofficial tour in 1935–36.

== First-class matches ==
Matches were played against 16 of the 17 first-class counties, with five won and four lost. The touring side was particularly strong in batting, and most of their victories relied on the weight of runs produced. The exception was the match against Somerset at Weston-super-Mare where the New Zealanders, after being dismissed for 128 in the second innings, their lowest total of the tour, won by 94 runs with Allcott taking five wickets for three runs in a feeble display by the county. The match was Arthur Wellard's first first-class appearance.

Perhaps the most exciting game was the drawn match with Surrey at The Oval. In three days 1,345 runs were scored. New Zealand made 313, with 103 for Mills, and Surrey responded with 377, Jack Hobbs scoring 146. New Zealand then made a rapid 371, with Dempster making 101 and McGirr 66, and Merritt reduced Surrey to 207 for 8, taking five wickets. But an unbroken ninth wicket partnership of 77 took Surrey to within 24 of victory before the match ended.

Even that total of runs was surpassed in the match against an all-amateur MCC side, which yielded 1,522 runs in three May days, but ended as a draw. Other first-class matches included the usual touring side games with the universities and end-of-season festival cricket. But there were also first-class matches against the Royal Navy, the Army, the Civil Service and Wales. In all 26 matches, New Zealand won seven and lost five, with the others drawn, including several affected by weather.

== Other matches ==
The New Zealanders played 12 other matches, mostly of two-days duration, winning six of them and drawing the others. These included four games in a week in Scotland and five against Minor Counties.

== Leading players ==
Wisden Cricketers' Almanack for 1928, reporting on the tour, singled out the batting for special praise. "With scarcely an exception they played an enterprising game and in most instances made their runs in a style which told of intelligent coaching," it said. Six batsmen scored more than 1,000 runs in first-class matches. The tourists' averages were led by Dempster, with 1,430 runs at 44.68 runs per innings; by aggregate, Blunt did better, with 1,540 at exactly 44 runs an innings. Lowry, Mills, Page and Dacre also passed 1,000 runs in first-class games. In all matches, Dempster and Blunt scored more than 2,000 runs each.

The bowling was less successful. Merritt, aged 19, took 107 first-class wickets with leg-breaks and googlies, and Blunt, in similar style, took 78. But no other bowler took 50 and the fast bowler Cunningham failed completely, taking just five first-class wickets on the tour as a whole. In all matches, Merritt took 169 wickets. Blunt's all-round performance earned him selection as one of the five Wisden Cricketers of the Year in the 1928 annual.

James, with 42 catches and 43 stumpings in the first-class matches, was also singled out for praise by Wisden. The rest of the fielding, it said, fell below normal first-class standards.

== Verdict and aftermath ==
MCC reported in 1928 that the tour had been a success, and the following year that an MCC side would visit New Zealand in the 1929–30 season. As MCC also accepted an invitation to tour West Indies the same winter, and as several leading players excused themselves from both tours, the side that went to New Zealand was not especially strong. The representative matches played, though, were designated as New Zealand's first Test matches.

Largely owing to the persistently poor weather, the tour was not a financial success. The Coates government, with the support of the Opposition, contributed £1,000 to help defray the costs. In order to make up some of the remaining losses, the New Zealand Cricket Council organised two matches in Wellington and Christchurch in November 1927 between the touring team and a Rest of New Zealand team. The touring team had the better of a rain-ruined match in Wellington, and won the match in Christchurch by an innings.

== Ceylon and Australia ==
The New Zealanders had a stopover in Colombo during their voyage home, and another in Sydney. On 8 October, they played a one-day single-innings match against the Ceylon national team, which at that time did not have Test status. From 28 to 31 October, they played a first-class match against New South Wales and lost by 10 wickets.

== Sources ==
- Wisden Cricketers' Almanack, 1928, 1929 and 1930 editions
- Mike Batty, Bill Bernau and the New Zealand Cricket Tour of England 1927
- Don Neely & Richard Payne, Men in White: The History of New Zealand International Cricket, 1894–1985, Moa, Auckland, 1986, pp. 74–97
