= Bill Merritt (cricketer) =

New Zealand cricketer & rugby league player (1908–1977)

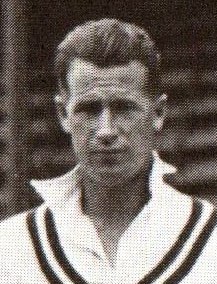
- Bill Merritt in 1936

Personal information
- Full name: William Edward Merritt
- Born: 18 August 1908; Sumner, Christchurch, New Zealand
- Died: 9 June 1977 (aged 68); Christchurch, New Zealand
- Batting: Right-handed
- Bowling: Leg-break googly

International information
- National side: New Zealand (1930–1931)
- Test debut (cap 9): 10 January 1930 v England
- Last Test: 29 July 1931 v England

Career statistics
Competition	Test	First-class
Matches	6	125
Runs scored	73	3,147
Batting average	10.42	19.91
100s/50s	0/0	0/12
Top score	19	87
Balls bowled	936	24,255
Wickets	12	537
Bowling average	51.41	25.45
5 wickets in innings	0	37
10 wickets in match	0	8
Best bowling	4/104	8/41
Catches/stumpings	2/–	58/–
- Source: Cricinfo, 11 April 2017
- Rugby league career

Playing information
Club
Years	Team	Pld	T	G	FG	P
	Wigan
	Halifax
	Total	0	0	0	0	0
Representative
Years	Team	Pld	T	G	FG	P
	Canterbury

William Edward Merritt (18 August 1908 – 9 June 1977) was a New Zealand Test cricketer who played for Canterbury and Northamptonshire, and a rugby league footballer who played for Canterbury, Wigan and Halifax.

== Career in New Zealand ==
Merritt was born on 18 August 1908, in Sumner, and attended Christchurch Boys' High School. A leg break and googly bowler and a forceful lower order batsman, he had played just four first-class matches when he was selected for the New Zealand tour to England in 1927 – in one of the four, he had taken eight Otago wickets for 68 runs in an innings. The 1927 tour, though no Test matches were played, was a triumph: Merritt took 107 wickets and Wisden noted that though "he showed no great command of length... on certain days – and these were fairly frequent – he had the best of batsmen in trouble".

Merritt was a certain selection when New Zealand were elevated to Test status with the MCC tour of 1929–30, but failed to live up to expectations. In the four Tests, he took just eight wickets and, though he bowled more than any other New Zealand player, his bowling was hit for more than 3.6 runs an over, a high scoring rate for those days. Returning to England on the 1931 tour, he took 99 first-class wickets, but failed in the Tests and was dropped for the final Test at Manchester, which was in any case ruined by rain. Wisden noted that "he had his great days but in many matches bowled the bad ball far too often". Problems with maintaining a length were compounded by a tendency to over-bowl the googly at the expense of the more effective leg-break. His greatest moment on the tour came against the MCC at Lord's, when he bowled throughout the second innings to take 7 for 28 and dismiss the MCC for 48, giving the New Zealanders an innings victory.

In 1930 Merritt opened a sporting goods shop in Cashel Street, Christchurch, in partnership with his fellow Canterbury and New Zealand cricketer Ian Cromb. The shop was still operating under the same name in the 1990s.

== Career in England ==
At the end of the 1931 tour, Merritt stayed in England to play League cricket for the Rishton Cricket Club in Manchester, in breach of his New Zealand Cricket Council agreement not to play in England for at least two years; he took over 1000 League Cricket wickets, also scoring more than 7000 runs. After 2 seasons at Rishton he played for East Lancashire and continued to play in the League after the war. In the winters he played rugby league for Wigan and Halifax, having been a wing in the Canterbury team. Merritt: "My decision to come to England was dictated by business reasons, and when it is realised that some members of the New Zealand team are without employment at all, I do not think I can be blamed." He played only three more seasons in New Zealand. In 1935–36, his last season at home, he coached Canterbury and took 31 wickets in the Plunket Shield, which remained the record for several years. That season, in his last match in New Zealand, he took 13 wickets for 181 against Otago.

By 1938, he had qualified by residence to play for Northamptonshire, where his New Zealand Test colleague Ken James had settled as wicket-keeper. In his one full season for the county, 1939, he scored 926 runs and took 87 wickets, though in this one English season of eight-ball overs he was conceding runs at almost five an over. He was instrumental, with 12 wickets, in enabling Northamptonshire to record their first victory in first-class cricket for almost four years, against Cambridge University, and followed that up with six wickets in an innings when, in the same month of May 1939, the team beat another county (Leicestershire) for the first time since May 1935. Walter Hammond described one of his deliveries as "a leg-break which struck like a cobra, one of the nastiest balls I have had to deal with".

Merritt served as a captain in the British Army during the Second World War. He returned to Northamptonshire to play one season after the war, but his appearances were restricted by a League contract to midweek games. He retired into the Leagues full-time after 1946, and ran a successful business in Dudley, Worcestershire. He joined the BBC commentary team for the Test matches when New Zealand toured England in 1958 and 1969.

Merritt returned to live in New Zealand in 1966. He and his wife Doris had a daughter. He died at the Princess Margaret Hospital, Christchurch, on 9 June 1977, aged 68.
