= Roger Blunt =

New Zealand cricketer (1900–1966)

Roger Blunt MBE
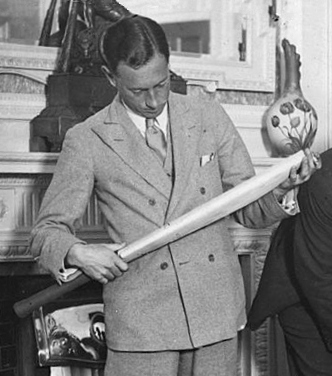
- Roger Blunt in 1931

Personal information
- Full name: Roger Charles Blunt
- Born: 3 November 1900; Durham, England
- Died: 22 June 1966 (aged 65); Westminster, England
- Batting: Right-handed
- Bowling: Legbreak

International information
- National side: New Zealand (1930–1932)
- Test debut (cap 2): 10 January 1930 v England
- Last Test: 4 March 1932 v South Africa

Domestic team information
- Years: Team
- 1917/18–1924/25: Canterbury
- 1926/27–1931/32: Otago

Career statistics
| Competition | Test | First-class |
|---|---|---|
| Matches | 9 | 123 |
| Runs scored | 330 | 7,953 |
| Batting average | 27.50 | 40.99 |
| 100s/50s | 0/1 | 15/40 |
| Top score | 96 | 338* |
| Balls bowled | 936 | 13,252 |
| Wickets | 12 | 213 |
| Bowling average | 39.33 | 31.16 |
| 5 wickets in innings | 0 | 5 |
| 10 wickets in match | 0 | 1 |
| Best bowling | 3/17 | 8/99 |
| Catches/stumpings | 5/– | 88/– |
- Source: Cricinfo, 11 April 2017

Roger Charles Blunt MBE (3 November 1900 – 22 June 1966) was a cricketer who played nine Test matches for the New Zealand national cricket team in the 1930s. He was the first New Zealand player to score a triple-century in first-class cricket.

== Personal life ==
Blunt was born in England, but his family moved to New Zealand when he was six months old. His father, a graduate of Christ Church, Oxford, was a professor at Canterbury College in Christchurch. Blunt was educated at Christ's College, Christchurch, where he captained the First XI cricket team.

== Early career ==
A batsman and leg-spinner, Blunt began his first-class career at 17 on Christmas Day 1917 for Canterbury against Otago at Christchurch, taking six wickets. He was a prolific batsman in domestic cricket throughout the 1920s. He was the leading run-maker in the 1922–23 season, scoring 583 first-class runs at an average of 53.00, helping Canterbury to win the Plunket Shield. He moved from Christchurch to Dunedin in 1926.

He played several representative matches for New Zealand against Australian and English teams in the days before New Zealand played Test cricket. When New Zealand made its first major overseas tour, to England in 1927, he scored 1,540 runs at 44.00 and took 77 wickets at 25.29, and in recognition of these performances he was chosen as one of the Wisden Cricketers of the Year in 1928.

== Later career ==
In New Zealand's first Test, against England in Christchurch in January 1930, Blunt made more runs and took more wickets than any other New Zealander (45 not out and 7; 3 for 17 and 2 for 17) as New Zealand lost by 8 wickets. He played in all of New Zealand's first nine Tests: four against England in 1929–30, three against England in 1931, and two against South Africa in 1931–32. His highest Test score was 96 against England at Lord's in 1931.

Batting for Otago against Canterbury in Christchurch in 1931–32, Blunt made 338 not out at a run a minute out of a total of 589 all out, in a match that Otago nevertheless lost. It was the first triple-century in New Zealand first-class cricket, and the highest first-class score by a New Zealander until Bert Sutcliffe beat it with 355 in 1949–50. Blunt also held the record as the highest-scoring New Zealand batsman with 7,769 runs until Sutcliffe surpassed it in 1953. Blunt's best first-class bowling figures were 8 for 99 for Otago against Auckland in Dunedin in 1930–31.

After the 1931–32 season Blunt played no further cricket in New Zealand, but did appear in three first-class matches in England in 1934 and 1935. He played many minor matches for Sir Julien Cahn's XI in England from 1933 to 1938, and toured North America with Cahn's XI in 1933.

== After cricket ==
After retiring from first-class cricket, Blunt lived in England, where he was a successful businessman. He captained London New Zealand Cricket Club in its inaugural match in 1952 and remained a prominent member of the club. In his memory the Roger Blunt Award is given annually for services to the club.

Blunt also became a radio commentator on cricket broadcasts, joining the BBC team for the 1949 New Zealand tour of England. In 1953, he was awarded the Queen Elizabeth II Coronation Medal. He was appointed a Member of the Order of the British Empire in the 1965 Queen's Birthday Honours.
