= Marylebone Cricket Club in New Zealand in 1935–36 =

International cricket tour

An English team raised by Marylebone Cricket Club (MCC) toured New Zealand from December 1935 to March 1936 and played eight first-class matches including four against the New Zealand national cricket team. MCC also played the main provincial teams, Auckland, Wellington, Canterbury and Otago, and ten non-first-class matches against teams from minor cricket associations.

The MCC team was captained by Errol Holmes. The overall tour included a short stopover in Ceylon, where a single minor match was played, and six first-class matches in Australia between October and December 1935.

== The team ==
- Errol Holmes (captain)
- Charles Lyttelton (vice-captain)
- Wilf Barber
- Sandy Baxter
- Billy Griffith
- Joe Hardstaff
- John Human
- James Langridge
- Mandy Mitchell-Innes
- Jim Parks
- Adam Powell
- Hopper Read
- Jim Sims
- Denis Smith

Bob Wyatt was offered the captaincy but declined, saying he needed a rest. In order to limit the expense of the tour, MCC chose only six professionals (Barber, Hardstaff, Langridge, Parks, Sims and Smith), and there was no manager. The team was the youngest-ever English touring team, with an average age of 26. Holmes judged his team to be "just about representative of England's second XI at the time".

Lyttelton, later known as Viscount Cobham, returned to New Zealand as Governor-General between 1957 and 1962.

== First-class matches ==
20-23 December 1935
Scorecard

| Wellington | v | Marylebone Cricket Club |
| 164 (55.2 overs); Jack Lamason 62; Jim Sims 8/53 (22 overs) | | 166 (55.1 overs); Charles Lyttelton 35; Denis Blundell 3/29 (11.1 overs) |
| 146 (37.5 overs); Jimmy Ell 61; Jim Sims 4/47 (10.5 overs) | | 130 (56.4 overs); Jim Sims 43; Denis Blundell 5/50 (22 overs) |

Wellington won by 14 runs
Basin Reserve, Wellington
Umpires: Charles Moore and Charlie Webb

- Marylebone Cricket Club elected to field

24-26 December 1935
Scorecard

| Canterbury | v | Marylebone Cricket Club |
| 243 (71.1 overs); Jack Kerr 146*; Jim Sims 4/52 (16 overs) | | 364 (94.5 overs); Wilf Barber 116; Ian Cromb 5/52 (14.5 overs) |
| 172 (59.5 overs); Jack Kerr 71; Hopper Read 6/61 (21 overs) | | 52/0 (16.1 overs); Jim Parks 34* |

Marylebone Cricket Club won by 10 wickets
Lancaster Park, Christchurch
Umpires: JT Forrester and R Coleman

- Canterbury elected to bat

31 December 1935-2 January 1936
Scorecard

| Otago | v | Marylebone Cricket Club |
| 78 (37.1 overs); Alec Knight 35; Jim Sims 3/11 (7.1 overs) | | 550 (128.4 overs); Denis Smith 165; Lankford Smith 3/71 (16 overs) |
| 357 (110.5 overs); Vic Cavanagh 66; Hopper Read 3/99 (29.5 overs) |

Marylebone Cricket Club won by an innings and 115 runs
Carisbrook, Dunedin
Umpires: Richard Torrance and William Butler

- Otago elected to bat first

10-13 January 1936
Scorecard

| New Zealand | v | Marylebone Cricket Club |
| 81 (38 overs); Lindsay Weir 21; Hopper Read 6/26 (9 overs) | | 653/5d (147 overs); Wilf Barber 173; Cedric Elmes 2/129 (32 overs) |
| 205/7 (65.1 overs); Giff Vivian 87; Hopper Read 5/74 (27 overs) |

Match drawn
Carisbrook, Dunedin
Umpires: Richard Torrance and William Butler

- New Zealand elected to bat

17-20 January 1936
Scorecard

| New Zealand | v | Marylebone Cricket Club |
| 242 (95.3 overs); Alby Roberts 75*; Jim Parks 4/46 (29 overs) | | 156 (54.5 overs); Mandy Mitchell-Innes 57; Ian Cromb 4/52 (14 overs) |
| 229/3d (55.1 overs); Jack Kerr 105*; Jim Sims 2/70 (17 overs) | | 130/7 (59 overs); James Langridge 61*; Alby Roberts 2/39 (22 overs) |

Match drawn
Basin Reserve, Wellington
Umpires: Charles W. Moore and DL Ryan

- New Zealand elected to bat

21-24 January 1936
Scorecard

| Auckland | v | Marylebone Cricket Club |
| 306/6d (106 overs); Merv Wallace 113; James Langridge 3/54 (28 overs) | | 329 (121.2 overs); Jim Parks 88; Raoul Garrard 4/114 (43 overs) |

Match drawn
Eden Park, Auckland
Umpires: DL Ryan and Oscar Montgomery

- Auckland elected to bat
- 23 February was taken as a rest day

28 February-2 March 1936
Scorecard

| New Zealand | v | Marylebone Cricket Club |
| 368 (116.1 overs); Cedric Elmes 99; Jim Sims 4/92 (25 overs) | | 435 (167.5 overs); Joe Hardstaff 147*; Bernard Griffiths 3/105 (28 overs) |
| 128/3 (63 overs); Mal Matheson 50*; Sandy Baxter 1/9 (6 overs) |

Match drawn
Eden Park, Auckland
Umpires: DL Ryan and Oscar Montgomery

- Toss not known
- 1 March was taken as a rest day

6-9 March 1936
Scorecard

| Marylebone Cricket Club | v | New Zealand |
| 195 (68.1 overs); Wilf Barber 60; Bernard Griffiths 4/60 (17 overs) | | 334 (96.1 overs); Jack Kerr 132; Hopper Read 5/72 (21.1 overs) |
| 142/2 (58 overs); Denis Smith 40*; Ian Cromb 1/32 (15 overs) |

Match drawn
Lancaster Park, Christchurch
Umpires: DL Ryan and JT Forrester

- Marylebone Cricket Club elected to bat
- 8 March was taken as a rest day
- No play on 9 March due to rain

== Assessments ==
The tour made a financial loss for the New Zealand Cricket Council of £3,000, which was considered severe.

== Bibliography ==
- Errol Holmes, Flannelled Foolishness, Hollis & Carter, London, 1957, pp. 126–143
- Don Neely & Richard Payne, Men in White: The History of New Zealand International Cricket, 1894–1985, Moa, Auckland, 1986, pp. 136–139
