= 1934–35 Plunket Shield season =

Cricket tournament in New Zealand

1934–35 Plunket Shield
- Cricket format: First-class
- Tournament format(s): Round-robin
- Champions: Canterbury
- Participants: 4
- Matches: 6

The 1934–35 Plunket Shield season was the fourteenth season where the Plunket Shield, the domestic first-class cricket competition of New Zealand, was competed as a league. Canterbury won the championship.

== Table ==
Table
Team	Played	W	L	DWF	DLF	Pts
		8		4	2	
Canterbury	3	2	0	0	1	18
Auckland	3	1	1	1	0	12
Wellington	3	1	2	0	0	8
Otago	3	0	1	1	1	6

=== Results ===
	Auckland	Canterbury	Otago	Wellington
Auckland				18-22 Jan; Auckland; 438 runs
Canterbury	25-28 Dec; Canterbury; 5 wickets			31 Dec-2 Jan; Canterbury; 10 wickets
Otago	31 Dec-3 Jan; Match drawn	22-26 Feb; Match drawn		
Wellington			24-26 Dec; Wellington; 8 wickets	

Home team won	Visiting team won	Match drawn

== Round 1 ==
24–26 December 1934
Scorecard

Otago	v	Wellington (H)
255 (63.5 overs); CJ Elmes 94; ED Blundell 6/82 (26.5 overs)		242 (66.5 overs); JR Lamason 103; FT Badcock 6/98 (28.5 overs)
133 (42.4 overs); CK Saxton 23; ED Blundell 5/48 (18.4 overs)		148/2 (52.2 overs); EWT Tindill 82*; GR Dickinson 1/28 (12.2 overs)

Wellington won by 8 wickets
Basin Reserve, Wellington
Umpires: LT Cobcroft and C Moore

- Otago won the toss and elected to bat

25–28 December 1934
Scorecard

Auckland	v	Canterbury (H)
279 (108.1 overs); HG Vivian 70; S Andrews 3/41 (23 overs)		230 (101.5 overs); FWJ Bellamy 77; LF Townsend 5/66 (32.5 overs)
187 (93.3 overs); RG Bush 55; M Graham 3/27 (18 overs)		237/5 (95.3 overs); FWJ Bellamy 49; J Cowie 3/66 (29 overs)

Canterbury won by 5 wickets
Lancaster Park, Christchurch
Umpires: T Burgess and J Forrester

- Auckland won the toss and elected to bat

== Round 2 ==
31 December 1934 – 2 January 1935
Scorecard

Canterbury (H)	v	Wellington
323 (106.4 overs); FWJ Bellamy 113; ED Blundell 4/113 (34 overs)		155 (62.1 overs); JA Ell 41; FWJ Bellamy 5/31 (17.1 overs)
74/0 (22.5 overs); JL Kerr 44*		241 (f-o) (88 overs); JR Lamason 90; S Andrews 6/59 (25 overs)

Canterbury won by 10 wickets
Lancaster Park, Christchurch
Umpires: T Burgess and J Forrester

- Canterbury won the toss and elected to bat

31 December 1934 – 3 January 1935
Scorecard

Otago (H)	v	Auckland
278 (100.1 overs); KFM Uttley 62; LF Townsend 5/83 (35.1 overs)		450 (191.2 overs); HG Vivian 101; CJ Elmes 4/72 (26 overs)
42/2 (29 overs); CK Saxton 22*; J Cowie 1/7 (4 overs)

Match drawn
Carisbrook, Dunedin
Umpires: W Mackersey and A Downes

- Otago won the toss and elected to bat

== Round 3 ==
18–22 January 1935
Scorecard

Auckland (H)	v	Wellington
401 (135.5 overs); PE Whitelaw 115; JR Lamason 5/101 (29 overs)		255 (101.1 overs); EG McLeod 69; LF Townsend 5/89 (37.1 overs)
431/7d (117 overs); PE Whitelaw 155; JR Lamason 4/109 (32 overs)		139 (73.5 overs); EWT Tindill 37; LF Townsend 7/25 (19.5 overs)

Auckland won by 438 runs
Eden Park, Auckland
Umpires: DL Ryan and OR Montgomery

- Auckland won the toss and elected to bat
- 20 January was taken as a rest day.

22–26 February 1935
Scorecard

Otago (H)	v	Canterbury
248 (83 overs); FT Badcock 136; M Graham 5/76 (27 overs)		141 (84.4 overs); WA Hadlee 37; GR Dickinson 5/26 (22 overs)
241/7d (71.1 overs); RO Talbot 69; M Graham 4/50 (22 overs)		151/5 (55 overs); JL Kerr 59; GR Dickinson 2/27 (11 overs)

Match drawn
Carisbrook, Dunedin
Umpires: G McQueen and W Butler

- Otago won the toss and elected to bat
- There was no play on the first day
  24 February was taken as a rest day.

== Statistics ==
=== Most runs ===
Paul Whitelaw of Auckland was the highest scorer with 384 runs at an average of 76.80. He was the only player to score two centuries.

=== Most wickets ===
Les Townsend, playing for Auckland, was the leading wicket-taker with 24 at an average of 13.91.
