= Dudley Everett =

Australian cricketer and RAAF officer

Personal information
- Full name: Dudley Tabor Everett
- Born: 9 March 1912; Perth, Western Australia
- Died: 3 May 1943 (aged 31) near Ameliasburgh, Ontario, Canada
- Batting: Right-handed
- Role: Opening batsman

Domestic team information
- Years: Team
- 1935/36: Western Australia

Career statistics
| Competition | First-class |
|---|---|
| Matches | 1 |
| Runs scored | 0 |
| Batting average | 0.00 |
| 100s/50s | 0/0 |
| Top score | 0 |
| Catches/stumpings | 0/– |
- Source: CricketArchive, 29 December 2014

Flight Lieutenant Dudley Tabor Everett (9 March 1912 – 3 May 1943) was a Royal Australian Air Force (RAAF) officer and cricketer. He played a single first-class cricket match for Western Australia during the 1935–36 season. He was killed in a training accident in Canada during World War II.

Everett was born in Perth in March 1912, and went to Hale School. He played cricket and football at school, going to play grade cricket for North Perth (now Joondalup) in the local competition. A right-handed opening batsman known for his fielding at cover, Everett's single first-class match for Western Australia came in October 1935, against a touring MCC side led by Errol Holmes. Opening the batting with Frederick Taaffe, he was bowled for a duck by Sandy Baxter in Western Australia's only innings, with the match finishing in a draw after three days. As well as playing cricket, Everett was also a talented field hockey player. As a centre-half or inside-right, he played for Perth and Old Haleians in local competitions, and represented Western Australia at several inter-state carnivals.

Having gained his pilot's licence in January 1935, Everett was called up to the RAAF on the outbreak of war in 1939. He was initially stationed at RAAF Pearce, near Perth, and later worked as an instructor at the Central Flying School (at Camden Aerodrome) and the Elementary Training School (at RAAF Narrandera), both in country New South Wales. At Narrandera, he was one of four WA state cricketers, the others being Gordon Eyres, Keith Jeffreys, and Alexander Barras. While stationed there in January 1941, he severely fractured his leg while working at a makeshift office next to a landing strip at Grong Grong, after the wingtip of a trainee pilot's Tiger Moth clipped his desk. The pilot of the Tiger Moth was killed in the incident, with his instructor, acting as co-pilot, severely injured.

In December 1942, Everett and Eyres, who had gone to school together as well as both playing state cricket, were selected to train with the Royal Air Force (RAF) in Britain, as part of the Empire Air Training Scheme. By early 1943, he was training with the Royal Canadian Air Force at RCAF Base Trenton, in southern Ontario. While on a solo practice flight in a Harvard II on 3 May 1943, he crashed outside of Ameliasburgh, and was killed. Everett held the rank of flight lieutenant at the time of his death, and was buried in Trenton, Ontario.

== See also ==
- List of cricketers who were killed during military service
