= 1935 in sports =

== Alpine skiing ==
FIS Alpine World Ski Championships 5th FIS Alpine World Ski Championships are held at Mürren, Switzerland. The events are a downhill, a slalom and a combined race in both the men's and women's categories. The winners are:

- Men's Downhill – Franz Zingerle (Austria)
- Men's Slalom – Anton Seelos (Austria)
- Men's Combined – Anton Seelos (Austria)
- Women's Downhill – Christl Cranz (Germany)
- Women's Slalom – Anny Rüegg (Switzerland)
- Women's Combined – Christl Cranz (Germany)

== American football ==
- NFL Championship: the Detroit Lions won 26–7 over the New York Giants at University of Detroit Stadium
- Rose Bowl (1934 season):
  - The Alabama Crimson Tide won 29–13 over the Stanford Indians to share the college football national championship
- Minnesota Golden Gophers – college football national championship shared with SMU Mustangs
- First Heisman Trophy presented to Jay Berwanger of the University of Chicago
- The Maxwell Football Club of Philadelphia was founded

== Association football ==
England

- First Division – Arsenal win the 1934–35 title, becoming only the second team to win the title three times in a row.
- FA Cup – Sheffield Wednesday beat West Bromwich Albion 4–2.

Spain

- La Liga won by Betis Balompié

Germany

- Origin of the DFB-Pokal, which is Germany's premier national cup competition, in the institution of the "Tschammer-Pokal", a competition with Nazi affiliations that is terminated at the end of World War II. It is then restored as the DFB-Pokal in the 1952–53 season.
- National Championship – FC Schalke 04 6–4 VfB Stuttgart
- Tschammer-Pokal – 1. FC Nürnberg 2–0 FC Schalke 04 in Düsseldorf

Italy

- Serie A won by Juventus

Portugal

- The inaugural Primeira Liga is won by F.C. Porto

France

- French Division 1 won by Sochaux-Montbéliard

Brazil

- January 25 – São Paulo Futebol Clube founded.

== Australian rules football ==
VFL Premiership

- 5 October – Collingwood wins the 39th VFL Premiership, defeating South Melbourne 11.12 (78) to 7.16 (58) in the 1935 VFL Grand Final
- Brownlow Medal awarded to Haydn Bunton, Sr. (Fitzroy)

South Australian National Football League

- 5 October – South Adelaide wins their first premiership since 1899, beating Port Adelaide 15.9 (99) to 13.13 (91)
- Magarey Medal awarded to Jack Cockburn (South Adelaide)

Western Australian National Football League

- 12 October – West Perth win their seventh premiership, defeating Subiaco 11.8 (74) to 7.9 (51)
- Sandover Medal awarded to Lou Daily (Subiaco) and George Krepp (Swan Districts)^{[a]}

== Baseball ==
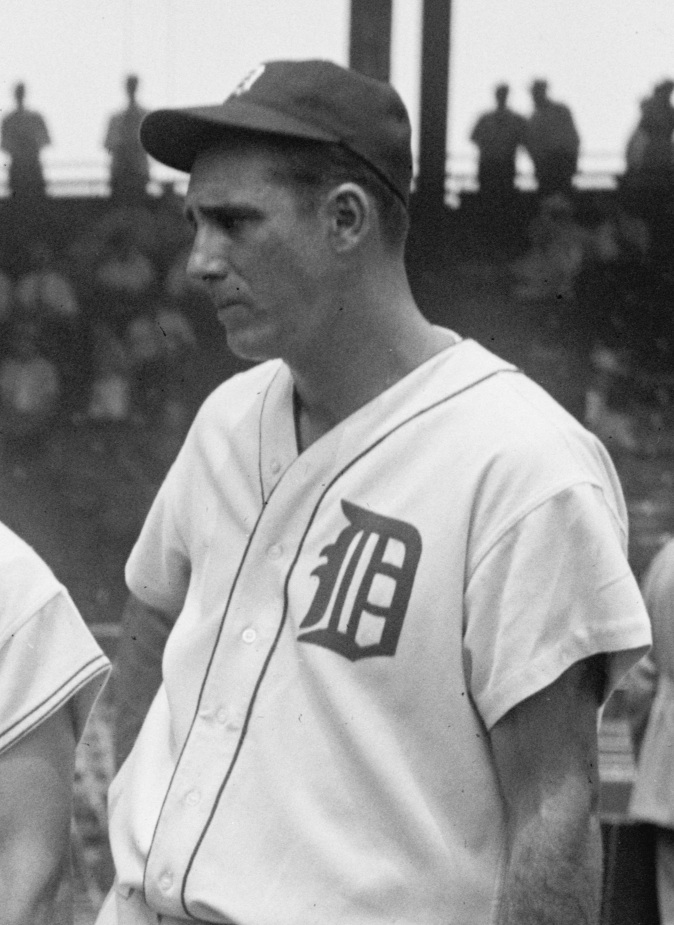
Hank Greenberg, Hall of Famer and 2-time MVP

- Detroit Tigers defeat Chicago Cubs 4–2 in the World Series
- MVPs:
  - American League: Hank Greenberg, Detroit Tigers
  - National League: Gabby Hartnett, Chicago Cubs
- On May 25, Babe Ruth has a last hurrah, hitting three home runs against the Pittsburgh Pirates. The final one, the last of his 714 career home runs, sets a baseball record that stood for 39 years. This homer is the first to clear the right field grandstand at Forbes Field and is measured at 600 feet (183 m).
- June 2 – Babe Ruth announces he is going to retire from the sport.
- The Winnipeg Maroons win the Northern League championship.
- Japanese club Hanshin Tigers, officially founded in Osaka on December 10.

== Basketball ==
Events

- Eurobasket 1935, won by Latvia, is the first European international basketball championship.
- The fourth South American Basketball Championship in Rio de Janeiro is won by Argentina.

== Boxing ==
Events

- 13 June – James J. Braddock defeats Max Baer over fifteen rounds at Long Island City to win the World Heavyweight Championship

Lineal world champions

- World Heavyweight Championship – Max Baer → James J. Braddock
- World Light Heavyweight Championship – Bob Olin → John Henry Lewis
- World Middleweight Championship – vacant
- World Welterweight Championship – Jimmy McLarnin → Barney Ross
- World Lightweight Championship – vacant → Tony Canzoneri
- World Featherweight Championship – vacant
- World Bantamweight Championship – Panama Al Brown → Sixto Escobar
- World Flyweight Championship – vacant → Benny Lynch

== Cricket ==
Events

- England tour the West Indies, and tie a four-Test series at one win each with two draws
- 9 March – The inaugural Ranji Trophy final begins a season after the death of K. S. Ranjitsinhji, in whose memory the trophy was awarded

England

- County Championship – Yorkshire
- Minor Counties Championship – Middlesex Second Eleven
- Most runs – Wally Hammond 2,616 @ 49.37 (HS 252)
- Most wickets – Tich Freeman 212 @ 21.51 (BB 8–40)
- South Africa defeat England one Test to nil with four draws

Australia

- Sheffield Shield – Victoria
- Most runs – Jack Fingleton 880 @ 58.66 (HS 134)
- Most wickets – Chuck Fleetwood-Smith 63 @ 20.34 (BB 8–113)

South Africa

- Currie Cup – not contested

India

- Bombay Quadrangular – Muslims
- Ranji Trophy – Bombay defeat Northern India by 208 runs

New Zealand

- Plunket Shield – Canterbury

West Indies

- Inter-Colonial Tournament – British Guiana

== Cycling ==
Tour de France

- Romain Maes wins the 29th Tour de France
- Francisco Cepeda becomes the first rider to die during a Tour de France when he falls from his bike descending into a ravine

Giro d'Italia

- Vasco Bergamaschi of Maino wins the 23rd Giro d'Italia

Vuelta a España

- The first edition of what will eventually become of one road bicycle racing's Grand Tours is raced and won by Gustaaf Deloor.

== Golf ==
Men's professional

- Masters Tournament – Gene Sarazen fired a double eagle on the 15th hole in the final round to force an 18-hole playoff which Sarazen would win the next day.
- U.S. Open – Sam Parks, Jr.
- British Open – Alf Perry
- PGA Championship – Johnny Revolta

Men's amateur

- British Amateur – Lawson Little
- U.S. Amateur – Lawson Little

Women's professional

- Women's Western Open – Opal Hill

== Horse racing ==
Steeplechases

- Cheltenham Gold Cup – Golden Miller
- Grand National – Reynoldstown

Flat races

- Australia – Melbourne Cup won by Marabou
- Canada – King's Plate won by Sally Fuller
- France – Prix de l'Arc de Triomphe won by Samos
- Ireland – Irish Derby Stakes won by Museum
- English Triple Crown Races:
  1. 2,000 Guineas Stakes – Bahram
  2. The Derby – Bahram
  3. St. Leger Stakes – Bahram
- United States Triple Crown Races:
  1. Kentucky Derby – Omaha
  2. Preakness Stakes – Omaha
  3. Belmont Stakes – Omaha

== Ice hockey ==
- 4 April to 9 April – Montreal Maroons sweep Toronto Maple Leafs 3–0 to win the Stanley Cup
- Norway – The Norwegian Ice Hockey League was established

== Nordic skiing ==
FIS Nordic World Ski Championships

- 9th FIS Nordic World Ski Championships 1935 are held at Vysoké Tatry, Czechoslovakia

== Rowing ==
The Boat Race

- 6 April — Cambridge wins the 87th Oxford and Cambridge Boat Race

== Rugby league ==
- 1935 Kangaroo tour of New Zealand
- 1935 European Rugby League Championship / 1935–36 European Rugby League Championship
- 1935 New Zealand rugby league season
- 1935 NSWRFL season
- 1934–35 Northern Rugby Football League season / 1935–36 Northern Rugby Football League season

== Rugby union ==
- 48th Home Nations Championship series is won by Ireland

== Snooker ==
- World Snooker Championship – Joe Davis beats Willie Smith 25–20

== Speed skating ==
Speed Skating World Championships

- Men's All-round Champion – Michael Staksrud (Norway)

== Tennis ==
Australia

- Australian Men's Singles Championship – Jack Crawford (Australia) defeats Fred Perry (Great Britain) 2–6, 6–4, 6–4, 6–4
- Australian Women's Singles Championship – Dorothy Round Little (Great Britain) defeats Nancy Lyle Glover (Australia) 1–6, 6–1, 6–3

England

- Wimbledon Men's Singles Championship – Fred Perry (Great Britain) defeats Gottfried von Cramm (Germany) 6–2, 6–4, 6–4
- Wimbledon Women's Singles Championship – Helen Wills Moody (USA) defeats Helen Jacobs (USA) 6–3, 3–6, 7–5

France

- French Men's Singles Championship – Fred Perry (Great Britain) defeats Gottfried von Cramm (Germany) 6–3, 3–6, 6–1, 6–3
- French Women's Singles Championship – Hilde Krahwinkel Sperling (Germany) defeats Simonne Mathieu (France) 6–2, 6–1

USA

- American Men's Singles Championship – Wilmer Allison (USA) defeats Sidney Wood (USA) 6–2, 6–2, 6–3
- American Women's Singles Championship – Helen Jacobs (USA) defeats Sarah Palfrey Cooke (USA) 6–2, 6–4

Davis Cup

- 1935 International Lawn Tennis Challenge – Great Britain at 5–0 United States (14) Centre Court, Wimbledon (grass) London, United Kingdom

== Awards ==
- Associated Press Male Athlete of the Year – Joe Louis, Boxing
- Associated Press Female Athlete of the Year – Helen Wills Moody, Tennis

== Notes ==
^{a} The medal was originally awarded to Daily on a "casting vote", but it was forgotten that a countback would decide the medal in the event of tie – so both were given the medal after this error was discovered, since Krepp would have won outright had the countback been done first.
