= Marylebone Cricket Club in Australia in 1935–36 =

International cricket tour

An English cricket team, under the auspices of Marylebone Cricket Club (MCC), toured Australia from October to December 1935 before going to New Zealand for a three-month tour. It played first-class matches against each of the five mainland state teams, and one match against an Australian XI.

== Background ==
The Bodyline tour of 1932-33 had caused such lingering ill-will in Australia that MCC decided to precede England's Test tour of Australia in 1936-37 with a non-Test tour in 1935-36 aimed at restoring good-will between the two cricketing nations. They chose the Surrey amateur Errol Holmes to captain the team, and instructed him to ensure the players' demeanour was "cheerful and pleasant" and that they would play the game "in the proper spirit". Each player was "carefully selected, not only for his cricketing abilities but, equally, for his ambassadorial potentialities".

== The team ==
- Errol Holmes (captain)
- Charles Lyttelton (vice-captain)
- Wilf Barber
- Sandy Baxter
- Billy Griffith
- Joe Hardstaff
- John Human
- James Langridge
- Mandy Mitchell-Innes
- Jim Parks
- Adam Powell
- Hopper Read
- Jim Sims
- Denis Smith

Bob Wyatt was offered the captaincy but declined, saying he needed a rest. In order to limit the expense of the tour, only six professionals (Barber, Hardstaff, Langridge, Parks, Sims and Smith) were chosen, and there was no manager. The team was the youngest-ever English touring team, with an average age of 26. Holmes judged his team to be "just about representative of England's second XI at the time".

== The tour ==
The team arrived on 29 October and played the first match of the tour, a three-day game against Western Australia, beginning on 31 October. The match ended in a draw. The remaining Australian matches were all scheduled for four days.

The next match, against South Australia, was Don Bradman's first match for South Australia. He scored 15 and 50, falling lbw in each innings, and MCC won by 36 runs. The match against Victoria was drawn, and MCC then lost their only match of the tour by 10 wickets to New South Wales, captained by Alan McGilvray. MCC then beat Queensland by an innings, Human and Smith scoring MCC's first centuries of the tour.

The final match was against an Australian XI in Sydney beginning on 6 December. As the Australian Test team was touring South Africa, this match was effectively between the two national second elevens. MCC batted first and declared at 9 for 411, Hardstaff making 230 not out. The Australian XI made 227, and MCC declared again at 9 for 207. Needing 392 to win, the Australian XI were dismissed for 188, giving MCC victory by 203 runs.

Hardstaff was the leading batsman on the tour, with 634 runs at an average of 70.44. Sims was the leading wicket-taker, with 33 wickets at 25.27.

In assessing the tour, Holmes believed the team had "carried out [its] mission":

Not a single member of the side had put a foot wrong, and our cricket had been more than adequate. I genuinely believe that we had contributed not a little towards healing the wounds which undoubtedly existed, in the cricket world, between Australia and ourselves before our arrival.
