= Bernard Griffiths =

New Zealand cricketer (1910–1982)

Personal information
- Full name: Bernard George Griffiths
- Born: 24 February 1910; Wellington, New Zealand
- Died: 29 September 1982 (aged 72); Wellington
- Batting: Right-handed
- Bowling: Right-arm leg-spin

Domestic team information
- Years: Team
- 1931/32–1937/38: Wellington

Career statistics
Competition	First-class
Matches	14
Runs scored	155
Batting average	9.68
100s/50s	0/0
Top score	28
Balls bowled	2,022
Wickets	50
Bowling average	26.88
5 wickets in innings	3
10 wickets in match	0
Best bowling	6/55
Catches/stumpings	3/–
- Source: Cricinfo, 12 November 2017

Bernard George Griffiths (24 February 1910 – 29 September 1982) was a cricketer who played first-class cricket for Wellington in New Zealand between 1931 and 1938. He played for New Zealand, but not in Test matches.

== Cricket career ==
A leg-spinner, Bernard Griffiths made his first-class debut for Wellington in 1931–32, and played four games in four seasons before establishing his spot in the team in 1935–36. In Wellington's first match in 1935–36 his three wickets in the first innings helped Wellington to a narrow victory over the touring MCC team. A few days later, again at the Basin Reserve in Wellington, he took 2 for 21 and 6 for 55 when Wellington had another narrow victory, this time over Canterbury in the Plunket Shield. Although inclined to be erratic in length, Griffiths spun the ball sharply.

Griffiths took five wickets in the next Plunket Shield match against Otago and another five in the last match against Auckland, in which Wellington won the Plunket Shield. He was then selected in the last two of the four unofficial Test matches between New Zealand and the MCC. He took three wickets in the third match and four in the last. As New Zealand's Test leg-spinner Bill Merritt was now playing as a professional in England and was therefore ineligible for Test selection in future, Griffiths was regarded as the "most likely bowler to fill Merritt's place". Griffiths took 28 wickets in the season at an average of 18.96. Among New Zealand bowlers only Merritt (35 wickets) took more.

Griffiths' form fell away in the 1936–37 season, when he took only seven wickets in three matches at an average of 43.28. He was selected in the original team to tour England in 1937, but was then removed from the team shortly afterwards after failing a medical examination. Griffiths protested that apart from a few problems with his teeth there was nothing wrong with him, but the decision stood. He was replaced by a batsman, Jack Lamason, Griffiths' captain at Wellington.

Griffiths played only one more first-class match, in the 1937–38 season.
