= Reg Read =

New Zealand cricketer (1886–1974)

Personal information
- Full name: Reginald John Read
- Born: 8 June 1886; Auckland, New Zealand
- Died: 1 March 1974 (aged 87); Mount Pleasant, Christchurch, New Zealand
- Batting: Right-handed
- Bowling: Right-arm medium

Domestic team information
- Years: Team
- 1904/05–1937/38: Canterbury

Career statistics
Competition	First-class
Matches	48
Runs scored	1,034
Batting average	13.78
100s/50s	0/1
Top score	50
Balls bowled	11,343
Wickets	188
Bowling average	26.56
5 wickets in innings	11
10 wickets in match	1
Best bowling	7/24
Catches/stumpings	30/–
- Source: CricketArchive, 2 April 2014

Reginald John Read (8 June 1886 – 1 March 1974) was a New Zealand medium-pace bowler who played first-class cricket for Canterbury from 1904–05 to 1937–38.

== Playing career ==
Read made his first-class debut in Christchurch against the Australians at the age of 18 in February 1905, batting at number 11 and bowling only one over. He played two matches in 1906–07 but was given only seven overs altogether, and did not take a wicket.

He had to wait another 11 years for his next match. In 1917–18, for his Canterbury club Lancaster Park, he took 92 wickets in eight matches for 781 runs with his accurate medium-pace bowling, and he returned to the Canterbury side at the age of 31. The Plunket Shield was still in its wartime hiatus, but there were several inter-provincial friendly matches. In his first match, against Otago, he took 3 for 58 and 2 for 35 (bowling throughout the innings) and made 18 and 34 not out to help Canterbury to victory. In the next match he bowled through the entire Wellington first innings, taking 4 for 43 off 23 overs. He remained in the Canterbury side, opening the bowling for more than ten years until his early forties.

In 1920–21, in what proved to be Southland's second-last first-class match, Read took 7 for 35 and 7 for 24, bowling unchanged throughout the two innings. In 1922–23, when Canterbury won the Plunket Shield, he was the leading bowler in the competition, with 20 wickets at an average of 18.40. In the victory over Auckland that season he made his highest score, 50, then took 5 for 53 and 3 for 81.

No one in the 1926–27 Plunket Shield season bettered Read's tally of 19 wickets, but at 40 he was overlooked when the team for New Zealand's first tour of England in 1927 was chosen. He was selected to play for New Zealand against the touring Australians in 1927–28, but took only two wickets in the two matches. By the time New Zealand played Test cricket for the first time, in 1930, he was 43 and no longer playing for Canterbury.

Read kept playing for Lancaster Park, on his way to a tally of around 1800 wickets in club cricket. Without him, Canterbury won the Plunket Shield in 1934–35, but then did not win a match in 1935–36 or 1936–37, and for the 1937–38 season they brought Read back to open the bowling again at the age of 51. He took only four wickets in the three matches, and Canterbury finished last without a victory again, but his stamina was undiminished. In his final match he bowled 33.1 eight-ball overs, taking 1 for 102 as Auckland amassed 590.

In his first first-class match Read had played against Syd Gregory, whose first-class career began in 1890; in his last match he played against Merv Wallace, whose first-class career ended in 1961. Dick Brittenden said of Read: "From a run of about eight yards, he bowled medium-paced out-swingers and off-breaks ... his mastery of length and direction was absolute ... Read was one of the fittest cricketers ever to put on a pad."

== Personal life ==
Read worked as a foreman in a Christchurch foundry. Later he retired to live in Kaikōura. He and his wife Violet had one son. She died in 1947, aged 59; he died in his sleep at his nursing home in the Christchurch suburb of Mount Pleasant in March 1974, aged 87.
