= John Human =

English cricketer (1912–1991)

Personal information
- Full name: John Hanbury Human
- Born: 16 January 1912; Gosforth, Northumberland, England
- Died: 22 July 1991 (aged 79); Sydney, New South Wales, Australia
- Batting: Right-handed
- Bowling: Right-arm leg-spin
- Relatives: Roger Human (brother); Sir Samuel Walder (father-in-law)

Domestic team information
- Years: Team
- 1932 to 1934: Cambridge University
- 1935 to 1938: Middlesex

Career statistics
Competition	First-class
Matches	105
Runs scored	5246
Batting average	35.68
100s/50s	15/21
Top score	158*
Balls bowled	4236
Wickets	73
Bowling average	34.21
5 wickets in innings	3
10 wickets in match	0
Best bowling	7/119
Catches/stumpings	67/–
- Source: Cricinfo, 4 May 2020

John Hanbury Human (16 January 1912 – 22 July 1991) was an English cricketer who played first-class cricket in the 1930s before moving to Australia.

== Cricket career ==
John Human was educated at Repton and Clare College, Cambridge. He toured twice with the MCC and was considered unlucky not to be capped by England. He toured India in 1933-34 while still an undergraduate, but could not force his way into a strong batting side. He toured Australia and New Zealand under Errol Holmes in 1935–36 and played in each of the four unofficial Tests in New Zealand.

He played in 49 first-class matches for Middlesex, scoring 1,703 runs, with three hundreds, the highest being his 144 at the Oval in 1935, when he and Hendren added 285 in 210 minutes. That was the year of the "leather-jackets" at Lord's, when crane fly larvae ate much of the grass on the pitch, and also of a change in the LBW law. Most of the Middlesex batsmen were out of form, only Human and Hendren scoring hundreds.

Human was a tall and powerful batsman; Terence Prittie wrote that "his driving stands out in an era when the development of back-play and leg-side technique has put forward play at a discount". He also bowled leg-spin and was a sprightly field.

== Later life ==
Human settled in Sydney and married Mollie Walder (daughter of Sir Samuel Walder, the Lord Mayor), whom he had met on the boat to Australia for the 1935–36 tour. He served in the Australian Army in World War II with the rank of major. After the war he entered a business career. He also broadcast frequently on cricket.

His older brother Roger Human played 59 first-class matches in the 1930s.
