= 1921–22 Plunket Shield season =

Cricket tournament in New Zealand

1921–22 Plunket Shield
- Cricket format: First-class
- Tournament format(s): Round-robin
- Champions: Auckland (6th title)
- Participants: 4
- Matches: 6

The 1921–22 Plunket Shield season was a tournament of the Plunket Shield, the domestic first-class cricket competition of New Zealand.

Auckland won the championship. For the first time, the Shield was not contested on the basis of challenge matches but by a single round-robin tournament between four first-class sides, Auckland, Canterbury, Otago and Wellington. Hawke's Bay, which had had first-class status and had challenged Auckland for the Plunket Shield in 1920-21, did not compete.

== Table ==
Team	Played	Won	Lost
Auckland	3	3	0
Wellington	3	2	1
Canterbury	3	1	2
Otago	3	0	3

== Statistics ==
=== Most runs ===
Syd Hiddleston, opening the batting for Wellington, scored the most runs, 308, had the highest batting average, 61.60, and made the only century, 118 against Otago.

=== Most wickets ===
Raoul Garrard, the Auckland leg-spinner, took the most wickets, 23 at an average of 10.34, and had the best figures, 8 for 51 against Canterbury.
