= Maurice Graham =

Maurice Graham may refer to:

- Maurice Graham (rugby union) (1931–2015), Australian rugby union player
- Maurice Graham (cricketer) (1902–1993), New Zealand cricketer
- Maurice W. Graham (1917–2006), holder of the title "King of the Hobos", later known as "Patriarch of the Hobos"
