= Paul Whitelaw =

New Zealand cricketer

- Whitelaw in 1931

Personal information
- Full name: Paul Erskine Whitelaw
- Born: 10 February 1910; Auckland, New Zealand
- Died: 28 August 1988 (aged 78); Auckland, New Zealand
- Batting: Right-handed

International information
- National side: New Zealand
- Test debut (cap 25): 24 March 1933 v England
- Last Test: 31 March 1933 v England

Career statistics
Competition	Test	First-class
Matches	2	49
Runs scored	64	2739
Batting average	32.00	37.52
100s/50s	0/0	5/15
Top score	30	195
Catches/stumpings	0/–	39/–
- Source: Cricinfo, 1 April 2017

Paul Erskine Whitelaw (10 February 1910 – 28 August 1988) was a New Zealand cricketer who played for Auckland and New Zealand.

== Domestic career ==
A right-handed opening batsman with a fine array of strokes, Whitelaw played first-class cricket for Auckland with some success from 1928–29 to 1946–47, averaging 37 runs per innings.

In 1934–35, playing for Auckland against Wellington, he scored 115, his first first-class century, in the first innings, and 155 in the second innings. In 1936–37, playing for Auckland against Otago at Dunedin, Whitelaw and Bill Carson set a world record that stood for almost 40 years by adding 445 for the third wicket. The partnership, which began with the score on 25 for 2, took only 268 minutes. Whitelaw's 195 in this match was his highest first-class score.

== International career ==
He made two Test match appearances, both on the short tour of New Zealand by the 1932-33 MCC side that followed the Bodyline tour of Australia. Both matches were dominated by the batting of Wally Hammond, who scored 563 runs in two innings, being dismissed just once. Whitelaw made 64 runs from four innings, two of them not out. He also represented New Zealand in matches against the MCC team led by Errol Holmes in 1935–36. He was twelfth man when New Zealand played Australia in a single Test in Wellington in 1945–46.

== Personal life ==
Whitelaw married Alison Hall (1910–2004) in July 1948. She was the scorer for his cricket club, Parnell, and was the first woman to be an official scorer for a Test match, when she scored during the Fourth Test in Auckland in 1930.
