= Maurice Graham (cricketer) =

New Zealand cricketer

Personal information
- Born: 12 August 1902; Leeston, Canterbury, New Zealand
- Died: 26 February 1993 (aged 90); Christchurch, New Zealand
- Batting: Left-handed
- Bowling: Right-arm medium
- Role: Bowler

Domestic team information
- Years: Team
- 1934/35–1936/37: Canterbury

Career statistics
Competition	First-class
Matches	9
Runs scored	68
Batting average	7.55
100s/50s	0/0
Top score	30*
Balls bowled	1530
Wickets	26
Bowling average	22.61
5 wickets in innings	1
10 wickets in match	0
Best bowling	5/76
Catches/stumpings	3/–
- Source: Cricinfo, 11 January 2024

Maurice Graham (12 August 1902 – 26 February 1993) was a New Zealand cricketer. He played in nine first-class matches for Canterbury between 1934 and 1937.

Graham was born in Leeston on the Canterbury Plains south of Christchurch and educated at Christchurch Boys' High School. He made his first-class debut in 1934–35, forming an effective pace attack with Stan Andrews and Alby Roberts to help Canterbury win the Plunket Shield. In the final match, against Otago, he took 5 for 76 and 4 for 50. He played a few more matches in the next two seasons but was less effective.

Graham married Doreen de Rosier Cook in Christchurch in May 1943. He served as a lance-bombardier with the New Zealand Artillery in World War II. He died in Christchurch in February 1993.
