= Alison Hall =

New Zealand cricketer (1910–2004)

Alison Margaret Hall (15 October 1910 – 2004) was a New Zealand cricket player and scorer. She was the first woman in the world to score an international cricket Test match.

== Biography ==
Hall attended Diocesan School for Girls, Auckland, and started playing cricket for the school in 1924; in her later years at the school she captained the First XI.

From 1927, Hall was the scorer for senior men's cricket games at the Parnell Cricket Club in Auckland; she also scored for the Auckland provincial team. In February 1930 she sat alongside the English team's scorer Bill Ferguson to score the New Zealand vs England Test match at Eden Park. She was the first woman in the world to score a Test match, and at the age of 19, one of the youngest.

== Personal life ==
Hall married the Parnell, Auckland and New Zealand cricketer Paul Whitelaw in July 1948.
