= Agnes Ell =

New Zealand cricketer

Personal information
- Full name: Agnes Elizabeth Ell
- Born: 19 January 1917; Wellington, New Zealand
- Died: 30 July 2003 (aged 86); Wellington, New Zealand
- Batting: Right-handed
- Bowling: Right-arm medium
- Role: Bowler
- Relatives: Jimmy Ell (brother); Hilda Buck (sister-in-law)

International information
- National side: New Zealand (1935)
- Only Test (cap 5): 16 February 1935 v England

Domestic team information
- Years: Team
- 1935/36–1948/49: Wellington

Career statistics
| Competition | WTest | WFC |
|---|---|---|
| Matches | 1 | 10 |
| Runs scored | 2 | 89 |
| Batting average | 1.00 | 6.35 |
| 100s/50s | 0/0 | 0/0 |
| Top score | 1 | 22 |
| Balls bowled | 72 | 581 |
| Wickets | 0 | 15 |
| Bowling average | – | 19.40 |
| 5 wickets in innings | 0 | 0 |
| 10 wickets in match | 0 | 0 |
| Best bowling | – | 3/7 |
| Catches/stumpings | 0/– | 4/– |
- Source: CricketArchive, 29 November 2021

Agnes Elizabeth Ell (married name Hurcomb; 19 January 1917 – 30 July 2003) was a New Zealand cricketer who played as a right-arm medium bowler. She appeared in one Test match for New Zealand, their first, in 1935. She played domestic cricket for Wellington. She was the sister of cricketer Jimmy Ell.
