= 2026–27 Plunket Shield season =

Cricket tournament

2026–27 Plunket Shield
- Dates: 19 November 2026 – 29 March 2027
- Administrator: New Zealand Cricket
- Cricket format: First-class
- Tournament format: Round-robin
- Champions: Canterbury
- Participants: 6
- Matches: 24

The 2026–27 Plunket Shield is the 101st season of the Plunket Shield, a domestic first-class cricket competition that is taking place in New Zealand. The tournament started on 19 November 2026 and is set to conclude on 29 March 2027. Canterbury are the defending champions.

== Points table ==
Pos	Team	Pld	W	L	D	Pts	NetRpW
1	Auckland	0	0	0	0	0	
2	Canterbury	0	0	0	0	0	
3	Central Districts	0	0	0	0	0	
4	Northern Districts	0	0	0	0	0	
5	Otago	0	0	0	0	0	
6	Wellington	0	0	0	0	0	

First match(es) will be played: 19 November 2026. Source: Cricinfo, NZC
Rules for classification: 1) points; 2) wins; 3) net average per wicket.
- Points system: 12 for a win, 6 for a tie, 0 for a draw or loss.
- Batting bonus points: 1 point each for reaching 200, 250, 300, and 350 runs within the first 110 overs of each team's first innings.
- Bowling bonus points: 1 point each for taking 3, 5, 7, and 9 wickets within the first 110 overs of each team's first innings.
