= Bryan Andrews (cricketer) =

New Zealand cricketer

Bryan Andrews QSM
Personal information
- Born: 4 April 1945 (age 81); Christchurch, New Zealand
- Batting: Right-handed
- Bowling: Right-arm medium
- Role: Bowler
- Relatives: Stan Andrews (father)

International information
- National side: New Zealand
- Test debut (cap 127): 29 December 1973 v Australia
- Last Test: 5 January 1974 v Australia

Domestic team information
- Years: Team
- 1963/64–1966/67: Canterbury
- 1966/67–1969/70: Central Districts
- 1970/71–1973/74: Otago

Career statistics
Competition	Test	FC	LA
Matches	2	57	10
Runs scored	22	474	23
Batting average	22.00	9.11	7.66
100s/50s	0/0	0/0	0/0
Top score	17	21	6*
Balls bowled	256	12,045	528
Wickets	2	198	10
Bowling average	77.00	23.23	31.60
5 wickets in innings	0	11	0
10 wickets in match	0	0	0
Best bowling	2/40	7/37	2/18
Catches/stumpings	1/–	26/–	1/–
- Source: Cricinfo, 31 December 2021

Bryan Andrews QSM (born 4 April 1945) is a New Zealand former cricketer who played in two Test matches during the 1973–74 season. Later he was a member of the Radio Sport cricket commentary team, and served as President of the Auctioneers Association of New Zealand.

== Cricket career ==
Andrews was born in Christchurch in 1945. He began his first-class cricket career with Canterbury in 1963–64, moved to Central Districts during the 1966–67 season, and later moved to Otago, where he played from 1970–71 to 1973–74.

He was considered a surprise choice to tour Australia with New Zealand in 1973–74, but after taking a five-wicket haul in the final warm-up match against Queensland was selected for the first Test of the series. He opened the bowling with Richard Hadlee but failed to take a wicket. After taking just two wickets in the second Test, he was replaced by Lance Cairns for the final Test of the series. After playing for Otago against the touring Australians a few weeks later he played no further first-class cricket. He played for New Zealand three times in the Australian domestic limited-overs cricket tournament: in 1971–72, 1972–73 (when New Zealand won) and 1973–74.

His best first-class bowling figures were seven wickets for 37 runs taken for Central Districts against Otago in 1969–70. He was the leading bowler in the Plunket Shield that season with 28 wickets taken at a bowling average of 15.96. He also played for Wanganui in the Hawke Cup from 1967 to 1970.

== Later life ==
Andrews was a member of the Radio Sport cricket commentary team for many years and worked as an auctioneer. For seven years until 2013 he served as President of the Auctioneers Association of New Zealand. He was awarded the Queen's Service Medal in 2015 for his community and charitable work, notably in organising and conducting charity auctions. He is an executive board member of the Halberg Disability Sport Foundation.
