= Ian Rutherford =

New Zealand cricketer (1957–2026)

Personal information
- Full name: Ian Alexander Rutherford
- Born: 30 June 1957; Dunedin, New Zealand
- Died: 2 April 2026 (aged 68); Ettrick, New Zealand
- Batting: Right-handed
- Bowling: Right-arm medium; Right-arm off break
- Relatives: Ken Rutherford (brother); Hamish Rutherford (nephew)

Domestic team information
- Years: Team
- 1974–75 – 1976–77: Otago
- 1976: Worcestershire
- 1977–78: Central Districts
- 1977–78: Wanganui
- 1978–79 – 1983–84: Otago
- 1981–82 – 1985–86: Central Otago
- FC debut: 26 December 1974 Otago v Canterbury
- Last FC: 6 March 1984 Otago v Central Districts
- LA debut: 30 November 1975 Otago v Canterbury
- Last LA: 23 January 1983 Otago v Canterbury

Career statistics
Competition	First-class	List A
Matches	79	21
Runs scored	3,794	449
Batting average	27.10	21.38
100s/50s	5/16	1/1
Top score	222	100
Balls bowled	79	8
Wickets	1	0
Bowling average	28.00	–
5 wickets in innings	0	–
10 wickets in match	0	–
Best bowling	1/8	–
Catches/stumpings	50/–	13/–
- Source: CricketArchive, 20 October 2023

Ian Alexander Rutherford (30 June 1957 – 2 April 2026) was a New Zealand cricketer who played for Central Districts and Otago between 1974 and 1984. In 1978–79 in the Shell Trophy Final he batted for 625 minutes for his highest first-class score of 222 for Otago against Central Districts in New Plymouth. He was the older brother of Ken Rutherford. He also played for Central Otago in the Hawke Cup.

Rutherford played 79 first class matches and scored 3794 runs at an average of 27.10 with five centuries and 16 fifties. He also played 21 List A matches, scoring 449 runs at an average of 14.96 with one century and one fifty. He was described as "a dependable presence at the top of the order". He was also a member of three Otago Plunket Shield-winning sides.

Rutherford was a patron of the Molyneux Cricket Club in Alexandra.

Rutherford died as a result of a car collision near Ettrick in Central Otago, on 2 April 2026, at the age of 68.
