= Arnold Read =

English cricketer

Personal information
- Full name: Arnold Holcombe Read
- Born: 24 January 1880; Snaresbrook, Essex, England
- Died: 20 May 1957 (aged 77); Englefield Green, Surrey, England
- Batting: Right-handed
- Bowling: Right-arm slow-medium
- Role: Bowler
- Relatives: Hopper Read (son)

Domestic team information
- Years: Team
- 1904–1910: Essex

Career statistics
Competition	First-class
Matches	22
Runs scored	419
Batting average	17.45
100s/50s	0/2
Top score	70
Balls bowled	2,162
Wickets	38
Bowling average	31.36
5 wickets in innings	1
10 wickets in match	0
Best bowling	7/75
Catches/stumpings	7/–
- Source: Cricinfo, 8 November 2020

Arnold Holcombe Read (24 January 1880 – 20 May 1957) was an English stockbroker and cricketer who played for Essex between 1904 and 1910.

Read was born at Snaresbrook in Essex in 1880 the son of Ernest and Jane (née Jervis) Read. His father was a stockbroker who had played for Essex in the years before the team had first-class status, whilst his uncle, John Read, had been one of the county's early honorary secretaries. His grandfather John Francis Holcombe Read had been born in Jamaica and married Mary Jervis, a wealthy heiress who inherited money from slave plantations on the island from her father Edward Jervis Jervis, 2nd Viscount St Vincent. Read grew up at Buckhurst Hill in the county and was educated at Winchester College.

After first playing for the county Second XI in 1903, Read made his first-class debut for Essex in 1904. After his debut, against Warwickshire at Edgbaston, he played one match the following season against the same opponents, top-scoring in Essex's first innings with 70 runs. He did not, however, play again until 1908, when he took seven wickets for 75 runs against Northants and played for the whole of the second half of the County Championship season, making 12 appearances for the First XI. Six matches in 1909 and two in 1910 completed his first-class career, and in a total of 22 first-class matches he scored 419 runs and took 38 wickets.

Professionally Read worked as a stockbroker in the City of London. In the period before World War I he moved to Surrey where he played golf regularly. His son, Hopper Read, played first-class cricket for Surrey and Essex in the 1930s and made one Test match appearance for England in 1935.

Read died at Englefield Green in Surrey in 1957. He was aged 77.

== Bibliography ==
- Pracy D (2023) Gentlemen and players of Essex: the amateur and professional cricketers of Essex County Cricket Club, 1876–1979.
