= D. J. Cameron =

New Zealand journalist and sportswriter

Donald John Cameron (20 February 1933 – 7 September 2016) was a New Zealand journalist and sportswriter. He was one of the leading New Zealand sportswriters of the 20th century.

== Early life ==
Born in Dunedin, Cameron was educated at Christian Brothers' High School, Dunedin (1946), St Peter's College, Auckland (1946–47), St Patrick's High School, Timaru and St. Kevin's College, Oamaru (1948–49).

== Career ==
He was sports reporter on the New Zealand Herald (1950-1998). He wrote several books on sport "'D J Cameron' was the familiar by-line on sports stories that appeared in the New Zealand Herald over the period over 40 years that he was employed on that newspaper.

== Death ==
Cameron died in Auckland on 7 September 2016.

== Bibliography ==
- Caribbean Crusade: The New Zealand Cricketers in the West Indies 1972 (1972)
- Memorable Moments in New Zealand Sport (1979; editor)
- All Blacks: Retreat From Glory (1980)
- Barbed Wire Boks (1981)
- Rugby Triumphant: The All Blacks in Australia and Wales (1981)
- Test Series '82: The Australian Cricket Tour of New Zealand (1982; with Dick Brittenden, A H and A W Reed), ISBN 0-589-014544
- On the Lions' Trail (1983)
- Someone Had to Do It: A Sports Journalist Remembers (1998)
- The New Zealand Herald Matches of the Century: 100 years of great New Zealand rugby (1999)
