= Hilda Buck =

New Zealand cricketer

Personal information
- Full name: Hilda Evelyn Buck
- Born: 27 December 1914; Palmerston North, New Zealand
- Died: 10 May 1990 (aged 75); Wellington, New Zealand
- Batting: Right-handed
- Role: Wicket-keeper
- Relatives: Jimmy Ell (husband); Agnes Ell (sister-in-law)

International information
- National side: New Zealand (1935)
- Only Test (cap 3): 16 February 1935 v England

Domestic team information
- Years: Team
- 1935/36–1945/46: Wellington

Career statistics
Competition	WTest	WFC
Matches	1	11
Runs scored	16	454
Batting average	8.00	21.61
100s/50s	0/0	0/3
Top score	16	74
Catches/stumpings	0/–	10/3
- Source: CricketArchive, 29 November 2021

Hilda Evelyn Buck (27 December 1914 – 10 May 1990) was a New Zealand cricketer who played as a wicket-keeper and right-handed batter. She appeared in one Test match for New Zealand, their first, in 1935. She played domestic cricket for Wellington. She married the Wellington cricketer Jimmy Ell.
