= Roger Human =

English cricketer (1909–1942)

Personal information
- Full name: Roger Henry Charles Human
- Born: 11 May 1909; Gosforth, Northumberland, England
- Died: 21 November 1942 (aged 33); Bangalore, Karnataka, British India
- Batting: Right-handed
- Bowling: Right-arm medium

Domestic team information
- Years: Team
- 1930–1931: Cambridge University
- 1934–1939: Worcestershire
- 1934: MCC
- FC debut: 21 May 1930 Cambridge Univ. v Leicestershire
- Last FC: 18 August 1939 Worcestershire v Kent

Career statistics
Competition	First-class
Matches	59
Runs scored	2,236
Batting average	24.57
100s/50s	0/14
Top score	81
Balls bowled	3,903
Wickets	51
Bowling average	38.17
5 wickets in innings	0
10 wickets in match	0
Best bowling	4/42
Catches/stumpings	34/–
- Source: CricketArchive, 19 September 2007

Roger Henry Charles Human (11 May 1909 – 21 November 1942) was an English first-class cricketer who played 59 matches in the 1930s. He mainly played for Cambridge University and then Worcestershire, but also appeared once each for the Gentlemen and Marylebone Cricket Club (MCC). Human also played minor counties cricket for Berkshire and (once) Oxfordshire. He gained Blues at both cricket and football.

Human was educated at Repton School, where in 1928 he captained the cricket XI and had considerable success as an all-rounder. By the age of 17, he was playing in the Minor Counties Championship for Berkshire, scoring 64 against Wiltshire at Marlborough College in August 1926. The following year he appeared twice at Lord's: once for Public Schools against the Army, then as captain of Young Amateurs versus Young Professionals, in which match he scored 51 and 2 and took 2–15, including the wicket of future England Test cricketer Jim Smith. In August 1929, he scored 138 against Devon.

Human continued to play for Berkshire until 1934, but meanwhile he had made his first-class debut, for Cambridge against Leicestershire at Fenner's in May 1930; his maiden wicket (and only one in the match) was that of Les Berry. He played several more times for Cambridge that season, hitting 67 and taking 3–87 in an eventful match in late June against Surrey County Cricket Club: Thomas Shepherd made 234 out of 565 for Surrey, in reply to which Cambridge fell to 284/6 before a seventh-wicket partnership of 257 between Trevil Morgan and Freddie Brown gave the university a seven-run first-innings lead. The game in the end was drawn. He took 4–42 (his career best) against MCC in early July, and was selected as a late choice for the 1930 Varsity Match immediately thereafter. However, he did very little to contribute toward's his university's victory, his only wicket being that of the Nawab of Pataudi, later to become his team-mate at Worcester.

1931 saw Human turn out 11 times for Cambridge, but his performances tended to be rather disappointing: he passed fifty only once, making 67 against Leicestershire in June, though with the ball he did collect 21 wickets — the most he ever managed in a season — at a respectable average of 35.52. He was again picked for the Varsity Match, but this time managed no wickets at all. That match marked the end of his first-class cricket for two seasons, though he continued to turn out fairly regularly for Berkshire, and made his only appearance for Oxfordshire against the touring Indians at Christ Church Ground, taking two wickets including that of captain K. S. Limbdi.

Human's first-class career resumed in late June 1934, when he made his Worcestershire debut, against his old university, at Worcester, hitting 75 in the first innings. Although most of his matches that summer were still with Berkshire, he did make two further first-class appearances in September. The first of these was for the Gentlemen against the Players at Scarborough, when he appeared with his brother, John; neither sibling had much success. A few days later he scored 51 for MCC against Kent at Folkestone.

All his remaining first-class games were for Worcestershire, for whom he continued to play a few times a season up until 1939; he was prevented from turning out more regularly by his position as a master at Bromsgrove School. Although he reached fifty 14 times in first-class cricket, he never made more than the 81 he hit against Essex in 1938. This was one of two occasions on which he captained the county, the other being versus Derbyshire ten days later. By now his bowling had fallen away considerably, and in his entire Worcestershire career he took only ten wickets at more than 60 runs apiece. His last game of all was an innings defeat by Kent at Worcester in August 1939; Human scored 15 and 9, and bowled not one ball.

Human was surprisingly chosen for the 1939–40 tour of India, but this tour never took place owing to the outbreak of the Second World War. He did in fact go to India, but as a soldier with the Oxfordshire and Buckinghamshire Light Infantry. Having reached the rank of captain, he died on active service in that country aged just 33.

His brother, the aforementioned John, played over 100 first-class matches, mostly for Cambridge, MCC and Middlesex.
