= Wilf Barber =

English cricketer

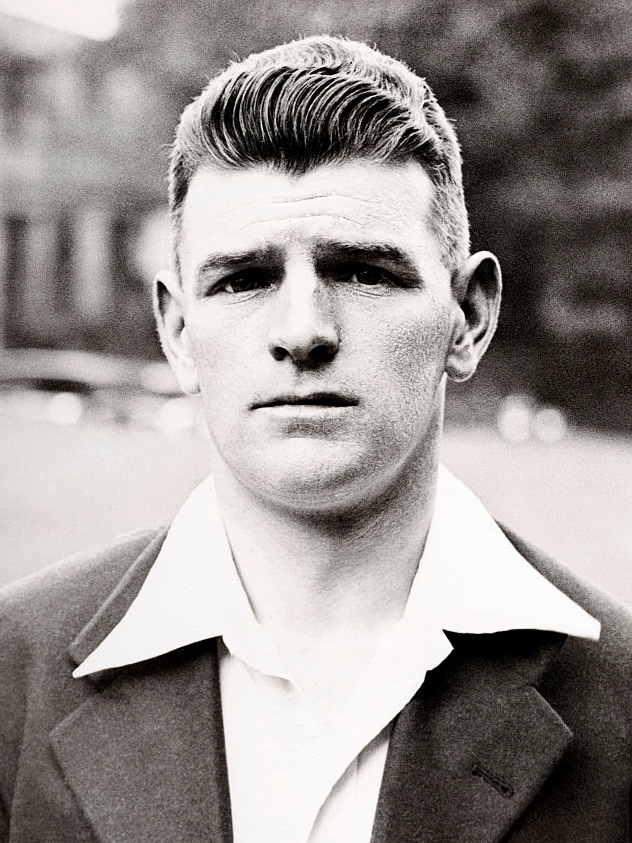
- Barber pictured in about 1934

Personal information
- Born: 18 April 1901; Cleckheaton, Yorkshire, England
- Died: 10 September 1968 (aged 67); Bradford, Yorkshire, England
- Batting: Right-handed
- Bowling: Right-arm fast-medium
- Role: Opening batsman

International information
- National side: England
- Test debut (cap 284): 13 July 1935 v South Africa
- Last Test: 27 July 1935 v South Africa

Domestic team information
- Years: Team
- 1926–1947: Yorkshire

Career statistics
Competition	Test	First-class
Matches	2	373
Runs scored	83	16,402
Batting average	20.75	34.38
100s/50s	0/0	29/78
Top score	44	255
Balls bowled	2	759
Wickets	1	16
Bowling average	0.00	26.18
5 wickets in innings	0	0
10 wickets in match	0	0
Best bowling	1/0	2/1
Catches/stumpings	1/–	182/–
- Source: ESPNcricinfo, 12 February 2010

Wilfred Barber (18 April 1901 – 10 September 1968) was a professional first-class cricketer who played for Yorkshire County Cricket Club from 1926 to 1947. He played two Test matches for England in 1935 against South Africa. An opening batsman with an excellent batting technique, Barber often batted in the middle order. He scored 16,402 runs in first-class cricket at an average of 34.28 with 29 centuries. Barber made his debut in 1926 and made several appearances over the next few seasons. Despite a sound defence, Barber did not secure a regular first team place until 1932. He scored a thousand runs for the first time that season, a feat he was to achieve eight times, while he scored over 2,000 runs in 1935. Until the Second World War broke out, Barber continued as a regular member of the Yorkshire side. After the war, he played one more full season before retiring in 1947. His career continued in club cricket and he went on to coach local sides before his death in 1968.

== Career ==
Barber was born on 18 April 1901 in Cleckheaton, Yorkshire. He did not appear for the Yorkshire Second XI until he was 25, in 1926, when he scored 600 runs, including a century, and averaged 40. The same season, he made his first-class debut for Yorkshire against Worcestershire without playing a single innings. He was scheduled to bat later in the innings and was not needed to bat as Yorkshire completed an easy victory. In the next season, he was chosen to play three matches, with a top score of 18. For the next few years, he was unable to attain a regular spot in the Yorkshire side as there were many batsmen competing for places. In the 1928 season, Barber played 16 matches, mainly when other batsmen were required in representative matches, passing fifty for the first time in an innings of 98 against the West Indians, and followed this with two other fifties. Next season, he scored his maiden first-class century against the South Africans in an innings of 108, out of a team total of 335, with no other batsman reaching fifty. In total, he played on 22 occasions and scored 857 runs at an average of 30.60, including a second century, against Glamorgan. However, Barber was in and out of the side over the next two seasons. He did not play 20 matches or reach 500 runs in either season and passed fifty only four times in total.

Matters changed for Barber in the 1932 season, when Yorkshire's regular, long serving opening batsman Percy Holmes began to suffer with illness. This left a batting place empty and enabled Barber to play more regularly. Wisden Cricketer's Almanack believed that he thoroughly deserved his place in the team as he scored exactly 1,000 runs at an average of 25.64, the first time he reached four figures in a season. He finished fifth in the Yorkshire batting averages, the first time he had been placed so high. His runs also played a part in Yorkshire winning the County Championship in his first full season. After this breakthrough, Barber steadily improved his total of runs and batting average, helping Yorkshire to win the County Championship twice in 1933 and 1935. In 1933, he scored 1,595 runs at an average of 33.93, and in 1934 he scored 1,927 runs at an average of 40.14. In both seasons he finished fourth in the Yorkshire averages. However, Barber's best season statistically was the following season, 1935, when he achieved his best aggregate of runs and highest average in an English season, passing 2,000 runs in a season for the only time in his career. He scored 2,147 runs at an average of 42.09 and finished third in the Yorkshire averages. These performances earned him selection for the Players against the Gentlemen at Lord's Cricket Ground for the only time in his career, where he scored 61 and 18 not out.

Also in 1935, Barber was chosen to represent England in the Test series against South Africa. He played in the third and fourth Tests after England had lost the second match to be 1–0 down in the series. He was one of six Yorkshire players selected that season. He scored 83 runs in four innings with a highest score of 44 in the fourth Test but England only drew these matches and he was left out of the final game. He also took a wicket with his second (and final) ball in Test cricket, when the match was heading towards an obvious draw. Following these matches, he was chosen to go on the non-Test playing tour by the Marylebone Cricket Club of Australia and New Zealand that winter under the captaincy of Errol Holmes. He was the senior professional but was not as effective as had been expected in Australia. However, in New Zealand he scored 365 runs in the matches against a New Zealand representative team, at an average of 60.83. He scored 797 runs in all first-class matches, average 41.94, including two centuries.

Although Barber did not play any more Tests, his scoring was consistent in the four seasons up until World War II. In all but 1936 (he scored 993 runs that year), he scored around 1,500 runs and in all but 1938 (he averaged just under 34), he averaged between 36 and 38. He was second in the Yorkshire batting averages in 1936, fourth in 1937 and 1939 but slipped to sixth in 1938. Following the war, Barber played one more full season, scoring 1,170 runs at an average of 30.00 in 1946 to be fourth in the Yorkshire averages. It was the eighth and final time he passed 1,000 runs in a season. During these seasons, Barber's runs contributed to Yorkshire being County Champions in four consecutive seasons from 1937 to 1939 and then again after the war in 1946. He played a further three matches in 1947 to bring his career to a close. From 1932, when Barber became a regular player, until his last full season in 1946, he was part of a Championship winning side seven times.

== Style and achievements ==
Barber scored a total of 16,402 runs in his career with 29 hundreds and 182 catches, and was described by Gerald Howat as "the fourth pillar" of the Yorkshire batting in the mid-1930s (after Herbert Sutcliffe, Maurice Leyland and Arthur Mitchell). A generally defensive batsman, he played carefully in the tradition of Yorkshire opening batsmen. Jim Kilburn said that Barber was "small in stature but upright in style". He was a good batsman on the off side and had a very good defensive technique, while his strength on the leg side was noted on his Test debut. Although an opening batsman, he often went in lower down the batting order. He was more comfortable in normal circumstances than in a crisis and did not enjoy batting on difficult pitches. Bill Bowes called him the most correct and orthodox batsman he had seen, even more so than Len Hutton. Barber was a kind, modest man, who never believed that his contribution was good enough, even if he had scored a century. On his death, Wisden described him as having "rendered admirable service."

Barber's highest score was 255 against Surrey in 1935. In this innings, he opened the batting and shared three successive century partnerships. Barber also scored 248 against Kent in 1934. He had scored 73 in the first innings but Kent had built up a lead of 148 on the second day of the match. Barber, opening the batting with Len Hutton, scored 248 and shared a stand of 267 for the first wicket. As a result, Yorkshire drew the game. Barber shared in seven other century opening partnerships Yorkshire, four of them with Arthur Mitchell, and six other 200 partnerships. This included a stand of 346 in four and a half hours with Maurice Leyland, against Middlesex in 1932 which was a record for Yorkshire's second wicket. His fielding, generally done in the deep, was described by Wisden as "first rate". Bowes said that he once went for nearly three years without dropping a catch on the leg side boundary from his bowling.

== Retirement ==
After his retirement, Barber played club cricket into his fifties, playing for Lidget Green and King Cross until 1952. He went on to play for Mirfield in the Central Yorkshire League between 1952 and 1955. There, he was the club's first professional once it reformed in 1952. During his time at the club, Barber scored eleven half centuries and won an award for his batting. After he left Mirfield, he became coach to the North Riding Educational Authorities, later working as coach and groundsman at a school in Harrogate. He died, aged 67, in a hospital in Bradford after a short illness, on 10 September 1968.

== Bibliography ==
- Bowes, Bill (1949). Express Deliveries. London: Stanley Paul.
- Hodgson, Derek (1989). The Official History of Yorkshire County Cricket Club. Ramsbury, Marlborough, Wiltshire: The Crowood Press. ISBN 1-85223-274-9.
