= Jack Kerr (cricketer) =

New Zealand cricketer

Jack Kerr CNZM OBE
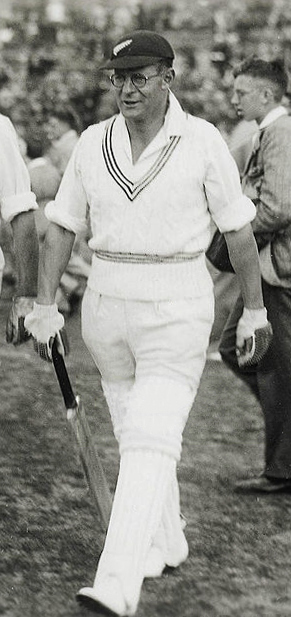
- Kerr in 1937

Personal information
- Full name: John Lambert Kerr
- Born: 28 December 1910; Dannevirke, New Zealand
- Died: 27 May 2007 (aged 96); Christchurch, New Zealand
- Batting: Right-handed
- Bowling: Right-arm medium

International information
- National side: New Zealand (1931–1937)
- Test debut (cap 19): 27 June 1931 v England
- Last Test: 24 July 1937 v England

Career statistics
Competition	Test	First-class
Matches	7	89
Runs scored	212	4829
Batting average	19.27	32.19
100s/50s	0/1	8/22
Top score	59	196
Balls bowled	–	92
Wickets	–	2
Bowling average	–	23.00
5 wickets in innings	–	0
10 wickets in match	–	0
Best bowling	–	2/32
Catches/stumpings	4/–	29/–
- Source: Cricinfo, 1 April 2017

John Lambert Kerr CNZM OBE (28 December 1910 – 27 May 2007) was a New Zealand cricketer who played seven Tests for the New Zealand cricket team before the Second World War. He was the second oldest surviving Test cricketer at the date of his death, 10 days younger than fellow countryman Eric Tindill, and the third longest-lived Test cricketer, after Tindill and Francis MacKinnon.

== Early life and career ==
Kerr was born in Dannevirke in the Manawatu-Wanganui district in the south of the North Island. His father encouraged him to take up cricket. He studied at Wanganui Technical College, where he was coached by Stewie Dempster. A solid opening batsman, with a technique based on a sound defence and scoring shots off his pads, he began to play in the Hawke Cup for Wanganui aged 15, helping his side to win the competition in his second year.

He moved to Christchurch on the South Island to take up a job as an accountant, and he played for Canterbury in the Plunket Shield in 1929–30 and 1930–31.

== Test career ==
Kerr was selected to play for the New Zealand cricket team on its tour to England in 1931. He had mixed results in the Tests, scoring 2 and 0 in the 1st Test at Lord's and 34 and 28 in the 2nd Test at the Oval, and was dropped for the 3rd Test at Old Trafford, but was more successful in the matches against the counties, scoring a total of 804 runs during a damp summer, at an average of 22.97. He played in one Test against the touring South African cricket team in 1932, scoring 0 and 3. He played his fourth Test against the touring England team in 1933, who were returning from the controversial Bodyline tour to Australia, making 59, his top Test score and only Test half-century. He was dominant in first class cricket in his native country, and made his highest first-class score the same year, reaching 196 playing for Canterbury against Wellington.

Kerr scored 146 not out and 71 for Canterbury against Errol Holmes's MCC tourists in 1935–36 and then posted 105 not out at Wellington and 132 at Christchurch in the "unofficial Tests", and was recognised as the season's best batsman, winning the Redpath Cup.

Kerr toured England again in 1937, playing his final two Tests at Lord's and Old Trafford, and scoring a total of 1,205 first-class runs on the tour at 31.71, with two hundreds.

== Later career ==
After retiring from the game and serving in the armed forces during the Second World War, Kerr chaired the New Zealand Cricket Council and managed the New Zealand side on their tour of South Africa in 1953–54. He also served as a Test selector after the Second World War.

New Zealand Cricket Chairman Sir John Anderson paid his predecessor the following tribute: "Jack [Kerr] made a significant contribution to New Zealand Cricket and the New Zealand Cricket Foundation over a number of years and his support was warmly welcomed and greatly appreciated."

Kerr was President of the West Christchurch club from 1956–57 to 1972, and Patron from 1977 to 2005 of the Burnside West Christchurch University Cricket Club. During this time he saw the merger of West Christchurch with Burnside and the move to Burnside Park. He continued to work as an accountant, in the firm of Holland and Kerr.

Kerr had two children with his wife, Edna. One, Robert, became a judge. Kerr died in Christchurch, aged 96.

== Honours and awards ==
In the 1972 Queen's Birthday Honours, Kerr was made an Officer of the Order of the British Empire, for valuable services to cricket. In the 1999 Queen's Birthday Honours, he was appointed a Companion of the New Zealand Order of Merit, for services to the community.
