= Bill Carson (sportsman) =

New Zealand sportsman (1916–1944)

Bill Carson MC
- Born: William Nicol Carson; 16 July 1916 Gisborne, New Zealand
- Died: 8 October 1944 (aged 28) At sea between Egypt and Bari, Italy
- Height: 1.82 m (6 ft 0 in)
- Weight: 90 kg (200 lb)
- School: Gisborne Boys' High School
- Occupation: Warehouseman

Rugby union career
- Position: Flanker
Provincial / State sides
Years	Team	Apps	(Points)
1936–39	Auckland	16	
International career
Years	Team	Apps	(Points)
1938	New Zealand	0	(0)
- Cricket career

Cricket information
- Batting: Left-handed
- Bowling: Left-arm fast-medium
- Role: All-rounder

Domestic team information
- Years: Team
- 1936/37–1939/40: Auckland

Career statistics
Competition	First-class
Matches	31
Runs scored	1,535
Batting average	34.88
100s/50s	4/3
Top score	290
Balls bowled	1,533
Wickets	35
Bowling average	21.48
5 wickets in innings	0
10 wickets in match	0
Best bowling	4/20
Catches/stumpings	27/–
- Source: CricketArchive

William Nicol Carson MC (16 July 1916 – 8 October 1944) was a New Zealand sportsman who represented his country at both cricket and rugby union.

== Early life and family ==
Born in Gisborne on 16 July 1916, Carson was the son of Mabel Alice Carson (née Scoullar) and her husband Alexander John Carson, the Gisborne harbourmaster. He was educated at Gisborne Boys' High School from 1929 to 1933, where he played in the school's 1st XV rugby team in 1933, as well as in the 1st XI cricket team. Carson married Marie Patricia Jeffries at St Luke's Church, in the Auckland suburb of Remuera, on 13 August 1940. The couple were to have no children.

== Cricket ==
Carson, an aggressive left-handed batsman and useful fast-medium bowler, started his first-class cricketing career with large scores for Auckland in the Plunket Shield in the 1936/37 season. In his second match, just his second innings of first-class cricket, Carson scored 290 against Otago at Carisbrook, part of a 445 run partnership with Paul Whitelaw. The pair set a world record for the third wicket in first-class cricket. Carson's score of 290 is still the highest maiden hundred scored by a New Zealander. In his next match, against Wellington at Eden Park, Carson made 194, giving him an aggregate of 496 runs and an average of 165.33 after three innings. His record aggregate total across his first three innings in first-class cricket stood until February 2022, when Sakibul Gani made 540 runs in his first three innings during the 2021–22 Ranji Trophy.

His performances with Auckland earned him a call up to the national side for their tour of England in 1937. Although he played 24 matches, all but four of them first-class fixtures, Carson wasn't able to break into the Test side which took on the England side. He had started the tour well, with 85 runs against Surrey and 86 versus Northamptonshire but he failed to contribute substantial scores in most matches. Carson finished the tour with 627 runs at 19.00.

== Rugby union ==
When Carson returned to New Zealand he focused on rugby, playing provincially with Auckland and for the North Island representative team as a flanker.

Carson was selected by the editors of the 1937 Rugby Almanac of New Zealand as one of their 5 promising players of the year.

As with his cricket career, he represented his country at rugby without appearing at Test level. Selected for the All Blacks' 1938 tour of Australia he made his All Blacks debut on 20 July 1938 for a game against the Combined Western Districts, followed by matches against Newcastle and the ACT.

He was seen as a likely candidate for inclusion in the All Black side to tour South Africa in 1940. However, World War II caused the cancellation of the tour to South Africa and spelled the end of Carson's rugby and cricket career.

== World War II ==
Carson embarked on war duty in 1940 and went on to participate in the Crete, North African and Italian campaigns. While serving in Italy with the 5th Field Regiment of the NZ Artillery, as a major, Carson was severely wounded in battle. He was evacuated but died from jaundice aboard ship whilst being taken from Bari in Southern Italy to Egypt. He was buried at the Heliopolis War Cemetery in Cairo.

A distinguished soldier, Carson was awarded the Military Cross in June 1943, and was mentioned in dispatches.
