= Arthur Baxter (cricketer) =

English cricketer

Personal information
- Full name: Arthur Douglas Baxter
- Born: 20 January 1910; Edinburgh, Scotland
- Died: 28 January 1986 (aged 76); Edenbridge, Kent, England
- Nickname: Sandy
- Batting: Right-handed
- Bowling: Right-arm fast-medium
- Role: Bowler

Domestic team information
- Years: Team
- 1929–37: Scotland
- 1933–34: Lancashire
- 1935–37: MCC
- 1938: Middlesex
- First-class debut: 6 July 1929 Scotland v Ireland
- Last First-class: 13 June 1939 Free Foresters v Cambridge University

Career statistics
Competition	First-class
Matches	42
Runs scored	273
Batting average	7.18
100s/50s	–/–
Top score	26*
Balls bowled	8405
Wickets	189
Bowling average	21.75
5 wickets in innings	16
10 wickets in match	4
Best bowling	7–33
Catches/stumpings	10/–
- Source: CricketArchive, 23 June 2013

Arthur Douglas "Sandy" Baxter (20 January 1910 – 28 January 1986) was a Scottish first-class cricketer who played with Lancashire, Middlesex and Scotland, as well as with various amateur teams in the 1930s.

He was educated at the preparatory school King's Mead School, at Seaford, Sussex, and in July 1930 he bowled Don Bradman in a non-first-class match for Scotland against Australia and to celebrate the school was given a half-day holiday to celebrate, though Bradman had scored 140 before he was out. He was later educated at Loretto School in Scotland.

Baxter was a highly enthusiastic cricket player for amateur teams, a fast bowler of in-swingers, a negligible tail-end batsman and a poor fielder. Despite being only an irregular first-class player, he took five wickets in an innings 16 times and four times went on to take 10 or more wickets in a match; in 1935 when he played seven first-class games, the most he ever achieved in a single season, he headed the English bowling averages for players bowling in 10 or more innings, with 42 wickets at 13.08. He toured Australia and New Zealand with the MCC in 1935–36. In a game for Lancashire against the touring West Indian side at Old Trafford in 1933, he took 5 for 10 runs in a 6 over spell.

Baxter became secretary and director of the paper manufacturing company Spicers Ltd.
