= 1935 English cricket season =

1935 was the 42nd season of County Championship cricket in England. England were beaten by South Africa who won the Test series 1–0 with four matches drawn. The championship was won by Yorkshire.

== Honours ==
- County Championship – Yorkshire
- Minor Counties Championship – Middlesex II
- Wisden – Jock Cameron, Errol Holmes, Bruce Mitchell, Denis Smith, Arthur Wellard

== Leading batsmen ==
Wally Hammond topped the averages with 2616 runs @ 49.35, a low average for the leading batsman.

== Leading bowlers ==
Hedley Verity was the leading bowler with an average of 14.36 and 211 wickets.

== Annual reviews ==
- Wisden Cricketers' Almanack 1936
