= Jimmy Ell =

New Zealand cricketer

Personal information
- Full name: James Anthony Ell
- Born: 15 September 1915; Lower Hutt, Wellington, New Zealand
- Died: 8 July 2007 (aged 91); Waikanae, Kāpiti Coast, New Zealand
- Batting: Right-handed
- Relatives: Hilda Buck (wife); Agnes Ell (sister)

Domestic team information
- Years: Team
- 1933/34–1945/46: Wellington

Career statistics
Competition	First-class
Matches	28
Runs scored	1,185
Batting average	22.35
100s/50s	0/9
Top score	89*
Balls bowled	46
Wickets	1
Bowling average	35.00
5 wickets in innings	0
10 wickets in match	0
Best bowling	1/21
Catches/stumpings	17/–
- Source: Cricinfo, 20 August 2018

James Anthony Ell (15 September 1915 – 8 July 2007) was a New Zealand cricketer who played first-class cricket for Wellington from 1933 to 1946.

Jimmy Ell appeared in 28 first-class matches as a right-handed batsman, scoring 1185 runs, with a highest of 89. He scored 61, top-scoring in the second innings, in Wellington's narrow victory over the touring MCC in 1935–36. In a senior club match in Wellington in November 1945 he scored 291 in three and a quarter hours, setting a new individual record in Wellington cricket.

The New Zealand cricket historian Don Neely described Ell as "a brilliant stylist with a hint of batting genius who never really developed into the great player he could have been". Ell admitted that his impatience often led to his dismissal.

Ell was born in Lower Hutt and educated at Johnsonville School and Wellington Technical College. He worked as a commercial artist in Wellington. His first wife Hilda and his sister Agnes played Test cricket for New Zealand.
