= Cedric Elmes =

New Zealand cricketer (1909–1995)

Ced Elmes
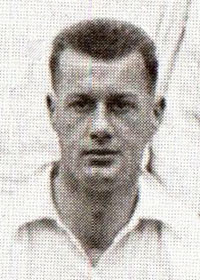
- Ced Elmes in 1936

Personal information
- Full name: Cedric James Elmes
- Born: 23 May 1909; Christchurch, New Zealand
- Died: 9 March 1995 (aged 85); Dunedin, New Zealand
- Batting: Left-handed
- Bowling: Slow left-arm orthodox

Domestic team information
- Years: Team
- 1927/28–1940/41: Otago

Career statistics
Competition	First-class
Matches	45
Runs scored	1707
Batting average	22.46
100s/50s	0/6
Top score	99
Balls bowled	5799
Wickets	72
Bowling average	38.84
5 wickets in innings	3
10 wickets in match	0
Best bowling	5/40
Catches/stumpings	35/–
- Source: CricketArchive, 26 December 2016

Cedric James Elmes (23 May 1909 – 9 March 1995) was a New Zealand cricketer. He played 39 first-class matches for Otago between 1927 and 1941.

== Cricket career ==
Born in Christchurch, Ced Elmes attended Christ's College, Christchurch from 1920 to 1922. He moved to Dunedin, where he played as a left-handed batsman, left-arm spin bowler and sure-handed slips fieldsman for the Grange Cricket Club. He made his first-class debut for Otago at the start of the 1927–28 season, and remained a fixture in the team until the Second World War. He took 5 for 68 for Otago against the MCC in 1929–30.

His best seasons were in the mid-1930s. He took his best bowling figures of 5 for 40 in Otago's loss to Auckland in 1933–34. A few weeks later he scored his first fifty, 92 not out, in Otago's victory over Wellington. In the first match of the next season he improved on his best score with 94 against Wellington.

When the MCC toured in 1935–36 he was selected in all four matches New Zealand played against the tourists. In the third match of the series, in Auckland, Elmes went to the wicket in the first innings with the score at 108 for five, made 99 in 123 minutes, and was seventh out at 303. However, his other contributions in the series were modest: he finished with 132 runs at an average of 26.40 and two wickets at 96.00. He is the only New Zealander to finish his first-class career with a top score of 99.

Elmes retired from cricket in 1956 after 31 seasons with Grange.
