= William Butler (cricketer) =

New Zealand cricketer (1871–1953)

Personal information
- Full name: William Patrick Butler
- Born: 8 November 1871; Dunedin, Otago, New Zealand
- Died: 19 August 1953 (aged 81); Dunedin, Otago, New Zealand

Domestic team information
- Years: Team
- 1901/02: Otago
- Only FC: 31 December 1901 Otago v Hawke's Bay

Umpiring information
- Tests umpired: 2 (1930–1932)
- Source: ESPNcricinfo, 24 August 2021

William Patrick Butler (8 November 1871 – 19 August 1953) was a New Zealand cricketer and Test cricket umpire.

Butler was born and died in Dunedin, where he attended Christian Brothers' High School. He made a single first-class appearance for Otago during the 1901–02 season, against Hawke's Bay. Opening the batting, he scored two runs in the only innings in which he batted, as Otago won the match by an innings.

Between 1921 and 1937, Butler umpired eighteen first-class matches in New Zealand and two Test matches. He umpired the first Test match ever played by New Zealand, in Christchurch in January 1930. Professionally Butler was a bookmaker.
