= Oscar Montgomery =

New Zealand cricket umpire

Personal information
- Full name: Oscar Robert Montgomery
- Born: 25 June 1895; Auckland, New Zealand
- Died: 6 June 1967 (aged 71); Auckland, New Zealand

Umpiring information
- Tests umpired: 1 (1947)
- Source: Cricinfo, 13 July 2013

Oscar Montgomery (25 June 1895 – 6 June 1967) was a New Zealand cricket umpire. He stood in one Test match, New Zealand vs. England, in 1947.

== See also ==
- List of Test cricket umpires
- English cricket team in New Zealand in 1946–47
