= Syd Hiddleston =

New Zealand cricketer (1890–1940)

Personal information
- Full name: John Sydney Hiddleston
- Born: 10 December 1890; Invercargill, Southland, New Zealand
- Died: 30 October 1940 (aged 49); Wellington, New Zealand
- Batting: Right-handed
- Bowling: Right-arm medium; Right-arm leg-spin

Domestic team information
- Years: Team
- 1909/10: Otago
- 1911/12: Southland
- 1913/14–1928/29: Wellington

Career statistics
Competition	First-class
Matches	52
Runs scored	3,814
Batting average	39.72
100s/50s	8/20
Top score	212
Balls bowled	3,663
Wickets	86
Bowling average	26.88
5 wickets in innings	3
10 wickets in match	1
Best bowling	8/59
Catches/stumpings	55/–
- Source: CricketArchive, 11 May 2014

John Sydney Hiddleston (10 December 1890 – 30 October 1940) was a cricketer who played for Otago, Wellington and New Zealand, from 1909–10 to 1928–29, in the years before New Zealand played Test cricket. He was born at Invercargill in Southland in 1890.

== Cricket career ==
An all-rounder who could bat at any position in the order and bowled medium pace and leg-spin, Hiddleston played three first-class matches for Otago in 1909–10 as well as playing in the Hawke Cup for Southland in 1911–12, before moving to Wellington, for whom he played his first first-class game in 1913–14. In his second game for Wellington he opened the batting in the first innings with Clarrie Grimmett; Hiddleston made 64 of their opening partnership of 78.

He played for New Zealand in the two international matches against Australia in 1921, one match against the MCC in 1922–23, two matches against the touring New South Wales team in 1923–24, and another two against Victoria in 1924–25. However, his performances in these matches were moderate: 270 runs at 19.28 and only one wicket.

Hiddleston's best performances came in the Plunket Shield. In the three-match competition in 1923–24 he scored 163, 46, 94, 34, 18 and 150, becoming the first player to hit 500 runs in a season. He broke the record again in 1925–26, scoring 212 (against Canterbury; his highest score), 73, 14, 34 and 204; his 537 runs in a season remained the record for more than 20 years. Wellington won the Shield in both of his record-breaking seasons.

He scored his 212 against Canterbury in 260 minutes. He opened the batting on the first day, was 103 not out at lunch, and was fourth out not long after tea with the score at 343, on a day in which Wellington scored 494 for 9 wickets off 94 eight-ball overs. So he is likely to have scored at a little under a run a ball. His 204 a few weeks later was probably a little slower, but no less impressive: he came to the wicket at 18 for 1, reached his double-century in 262 minutes, and was last out in a team total of 374 off 85.1 overs.

Hiddleston's best bowling performances came in two consecutive matches, both for Wellington against Canterbury in 1918–19, when he took 8 for 59 (on Christmas Day) and 2 for 82 then 5 for 75 and 2 for 78 when the two sides met again the next month taking 17 wickets in the two matches.

He won the Redpath Cup for batsman of the season in 1921–22 and 1923–24. Dick Brittenden said, "He was a thoughtful batsman, conscious of the problems of his trade; it was simply that he seemed able to resolve them more swiftly and efficiently than anyone else."

Hiddleston was one of the 11 players chosen in 1936 by the New Zealand cricket historian Tom Reese as the best New Zealand team of all time. When Tom Lowry was president of the New Zealand Cricket Council he made a speech in 1952 in which he declared that Hiddleston was one of New Zealand's "five greatest cricketers", along with Dan Reese, Martin Donnelly, Bert Sutcliffe and Jack Cowie.

== Personal life ==
Hiddleston worked as an indent agent in soft goods. His business commitments sometimes curtailed his cricket, preventing his participation in New Zealand's tours to Australia in 1925–26 and England in 1927.

He and his wife Rosina had one daughter. He died in October 1940 after a hernia operation, aged 49.
