= George Dickinson =

New Zealand sportsman

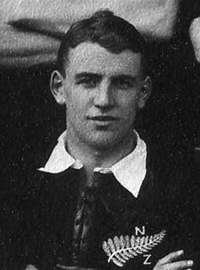
- Born: George Ritchie Dickinson; 11 March 1903 Dunedin, New Zealand
- Died: 17 March 1978 (aged 75) Lower Hutt, New Zealand
- Weight: 74 kg (163 lb)
- School: Otago Boys' High School

Rugby union career
- Position(s): First five-eighth, second five-eighth, centre
Provincial / State sides
Years	Team	Apps	(Points)
1922–1924	Otago	12	
International career
Years	Team	Apps	(Points)
1922	New Zealand	0	(0)
- Cricket career

Cricket information
- Batting: Right-handed
- Bowling: Right-arm fast

International information
- National side: New Zealand (1930–1932)
- Test debut (cap 4): 10 January 1930 v England
- Last Test: 4 March 1932 v South Africa

Domestic team information
- Years: Team
- 1921/22–1937/38: Otago
- 1943/44: Wellington

Career statistics
Competition	Test	First-class
Matches	3	39
Runs scored	31	1,013
Batting average	6.20	18.75
100s/50s	0/0	1/4
Top score	11	104
Balls bowled	451	8,546
Wickets	8	150
Bowling average	30.62	26.96
5 wickets in innings	0	11
10 wickets in match	0	2
Best bowling	3/66	7/90
Catches/stumpings	3/–	19/–
- Source: Cricinfo, 11 April 2017

George Ritchie Dickinson (11 March 1903 – 17 March 1978) was a New Zealand cricketer and rugby union player. He played three tests for the New Zealand cricket team between 1930 and 1932, and five matches for the New Zealand national rugby side, the All Blacks, in 1922.

== Early life and family ==
Born in Dunedin on 11 March 1903, Dickinson was the son of Henry Dickinson and Eliza Jane Dickinson (née McDonald). He was educated at Otago Boys' High School. On 11 June 1929 he married Rua Belle Milne at First Church in Dunedin.

== Sporting career ==
=== Rugby union ===
While at Otago Boys' High School, Dickinson played as a five-eighth in the school's 1st XV rugby team between 1918 and 1921. He made his debut for the All Blacks in 1922 on their tour of New South Wales, playing five matches and scoring three tries. He went on to play 12 matches for Otago between 1922 and 1924, scoring five tries, 11 conversions and one penalty goal. Dickinson also played for the South Island in 1922. He retired from first-class rugby at the age of 21.

=== Cricket ===
A fast bowler, Dickinson became the first so-called "double All Black" when he represented New Zealand at cricket against Victoria in the 1924–25 season. He played a match against Australia in 1927–28, then in New Zealand's first two official Tests, against England in 1929–30, and a final Test against South Africa in 1931–32. He took eight wickets at an average of 30.62 in his three Tests.

Dickinson played for Otago from 1920–21 to 1937–38, and one match for Wellington in the 1943–44 season. His outstanding performance came in Otago's match against the touring Australians in February 1928, when he dismissed seven of the first eight batsmen, at one stage taking six wickets for three runs in five overs, and finished with figures of 7 for 96. Other notable performances were 6 for 43 and 5 for 46 against Canterbury in 1924–25, and 7 for 90 and 4 for 55 against Wellington the next season. He also scored useful runs in the lower order, with one century, 104, against Wellington in 1927–28.

== Working life and death ==
Dickinson worked as a salesman, store manager, and clerk. He died in Lower Hutt on 17 March 1978, and his ashes were buried at Taitā Lawn Cemetery.
