= Hopper Read =

English cricketer

Personal information
- Batting: Right-handed
- Bowling: Right-arm fast
- Relatives: Arnold Read (father)

International information
- National side: England
- Only Test: 17 August 1935 v South Africa

Career statistics
Competition	Test	First-class
Matches	1	54
Runs scored	–	158
Batting average	–	3.67
100s/50s	–	0/0
Top score	–	25*
Balls bowled	270	8,382
Wickets	6	219
Bowling average	33.33	22.93
5 wickets in innings	0	13
10 wickets in match	0	2
Best bowling	4/136	7/35
Catches/stumpings	0/–	21/–
- Source: CricInfo, 7 November 2022

Holcombe Douglas "Hopper" Read (28 January 1910 – 5 January 2000) was an English cricketer who played in one Test in 1935.

== Biography ==
Read, who received his nickname from the eccentric leap in his long run-up was regarded as the fastest bowler in the world for the brief period he was able to play first-class cricket, and though he could be extremely erratic in length he was still an extremely dangerous bowler on a lively pitch. Although a capable fast bowler, Read's brief career was sufficient to show him among the very worst "rabbits" in the history of first-class cricket. At one point in 1935 he played eight successive runless innings, and overall "Hopper" scored in just 22 of the 58 innings he played in England. For Read's whole career his runs totalled almost thirty per cent less than his aggregate of wickets at a batting average that remains the lowest of any cricketer ever to play for his country. The only other Test cricketers with a first-class average of under four runs an innings are New Zealander Chris Martin, South African Alf Hall and Glamorgan paceman Jeff Jones.

Originally from Winchester College, Read never went up to either Oxford or Cambridge University but his reputation as a fast bowler in club cricket was such that Surrey gave him a trial against those two Universities in 1933 even though he never claimed qualification to represent Surrey in County Championship matches. Although he took 4 for 26 in the second innings against Cambridge, Surrey did not think it worth having Read properly qualify for them and they raised no objections when Essex asked if he might be available. Read was obviously qualified for Essex: not only was he born there but his father, Arnold Read, had played 22 games for their first eleven between 1904 and 1910.

Read played only one match for Essex in 1933 and took none for 56, but the following year, coming into the team after Kent had punished the Essex bowling for 803 runs at the cost of only four wickets, he caused a sensation. In his first over, he knocked off the cap of Jack Hobbs – in his last season of first-class cricket – and then bowled him. On a good pitch, Read's speed caused him to carry all before him with seven wickets for 35. Although his training as a chartered accountant made his appearances limited, he still took 69 wickets at an average better than any fast bowler except Larwood and his Essex compatriot Ken Farnes. For the Gentlemen against the Players at Folkestone in September Read took in two innings nine wickets for 171 runs, and Wisden opined that Read was the "find of the season".

In 1935, Read's profession prevented him playing any cricket until mid-June but when he entered the Essex side, he immediately clicked. Despite the fact that Farnes could not help him owing to injury, Read and Stan Nichols stood alone as a pace-bowling duo and in a sensational match at Huddersfield, their sheer pace off the pitch bowled out the otherwise unbeaten Yorkshire eleven for 31 and 99, giving Essex a win by an innings and 204 runs. This performance led to him being chosen for the last Test match against a strong South African side. On a shirt-front pitch, Read bowled very well to take six wickets – all of recognised batsmen. He was chosen for a tour led by Errol Holmes to Australia and New Zealand but his form there was variable – though he did take 11 for 100 against a New Zealand XI at Dunedin.

However, Read's employers at this time became so angry at his absence from duties as a chartered accountant that they threatened to sack him if he continued to play three-day cricket in the season of 1936. Consequently, the tour was the end of Read's career in first-class cricket apart from one match in 1948 for the Marylebone Cricket Club (MCC) against Ireland. Essex – who with Farnes and Read in tandem would have had the two fastest bowlers in the world and potentially the fastest attack of any county side in history – were never able to see what the potential of the two together would have been as they only were able to play together in one match on a slow wicket at the Wagon Works Ground against Gloucestershire in late 1934.

Read did play in club cricket on Saturdays for Englefield Green and The Butterflies for many years after he was no longer able to play three-day matches.
