= Dick Brittenden =

New Zealand cricket writer (1919–2002)

Dick Brittenden MBE
- Brittenden in 1977
- Born: Richard Trevor Brittenden; 22 September 1919; Rakaia, New Zealand
- Died: 10 June 2002 (aged 82); Christchurch, New Zealand
- Occupation: Sports journalist

Richard Trevor Brittenden MBE (22 September 1919 – 10 June 2002) was from the 1950s to the 1980s New Zealand's most prominent cricket writer.

== Early life, family and career ==
Brittenden was born at Rakaia on 22 September 1919, and was educated at Christchurch Boys' High School from 1933 to 1937. In October 1940 he married Joy Mantell, and the couple went on to have five children. His grandson, Nick Perry, is a journalist with the Associated Press.

During World War II, Brittenden served in the Royal New Zealand Air Force in Britain and the Bahamas. He joined the Christchurch Press in 1938 and became its sports editor in 1955, staying in that position until he retired in 1984.

== Cricket books ==
Brittenden reported on New Zealand's tour of South Africa in 1953-54, and wrote his first book about the tour, Silver Fern on the Veld (1954). Great Days in New Zealand Cricket followed in 1958: 26 chapters, each one describing a significant match in New Zealand cricket history. Fittingly, the longest chapter is the last one, on New Zealand's first, and at that stage only, Test victory, in Auckland in 1956.

In 1961 he wrote New Zealand Cricketers, 50 chapters, each one on a prominent New Zealand player, past or present. An extra chapter at the beginning is about Lord Cobham, New Zealand's cricket-playing Governor-General, who had just played his last first-class game at the age of 51, while a postscript is dedicated to "the below average cricketer", the dedicated but ungifted club player: "Without him, the game would not survive, because it would be meaningless." Having attended first-class cricket matches in New Zealand since 1928, Brittenden had watched and in most cases known personally all 50 subjects, except for the Wellington batsman Syd Hiddleston, "and I have found many cricketers of mature years eager and willing to talk about him". Reviewing the book in the Christchurch Press, Iain Gallaway wrote of Brittenden:

He has described with his customary apt use of metaphors and similes each one's peculiar gifts, attributes and failings (the chapter devoted to S. N. McGregor is a particularly brilliant illustration of this) analysing in a manner which confirms his profound knowledge of the game, and describing in a manner which I have always felt likens him so much to that most gifted English journalist, Denzil Batchelor.

Brittenden covered the tour to England, India and Pakistan in 1965 (Red Leather, Silver Fern), and the West Indies tour to New Zealand in 1968-69 and subsequent New Zealand tour to England, India and Pakistan in 1969-70 (Scoreboard '69).

In 1977 Brittenden wrote The Finest Years: Twenty Years of New Zealand Cricket, covering 17 significant Test Matches beginning with the victory at Auckland in 1956 and ending with the victory over India in Wellington in 1976; 22 profiles of leading players of the period follow. Of New Zealand Test cricket he writes, "It will always be a matter of ups and downs, with such a relatively small cricket population. The fact that there are ups is sufficient encouragement."

More books followed: 100 Years of Cricket: A History of the Canterbury Cricket Association, 1877-1977 (1977); Hadlee (with Richard Hadlee) (1981); A Cricket Century: The First 100 Years of the Lancaster Park Cricket Club Inc. (1981); Test Series '82: The Australian Cricket Tour of New Zealand (with Don Cameron and chapters by Greg Chappell and Geoff Howarth) (1982); Big Names in New Zealand Cricket: Fifty Profiles (1983); The New Zealand Cricketers' Who's Who (with Richard Hadlee and Francis Payne) (1985); England Skittled: New Zealand v. England, Wellington, 10–15 February 1978 (2000).

== Other works ==
Brittenden also wrote Give 'em the Axe: The First Hundred Years of the Christchurch Football Club (1963), and ghost-wrote Bert Sutcliffe's memoirs, Between Overs (1963). He was managing editor of the New Zealand Cricketer from its inception in 1967 to 1973, and also edited its successor, the Cricket Player.

In the 1985 Queen's Birthday Honours, Brittenden was appointed a Member of the Order of the British Empire, for services to sporting journalism. The press box at Lancaster Park in Christchurch was named after him.

== Death ==
Brittenden died in Christchurch on 10 June 2002.
