= Stan Andrews (cricketer) =

New Zealand cricketer (1912–1979)

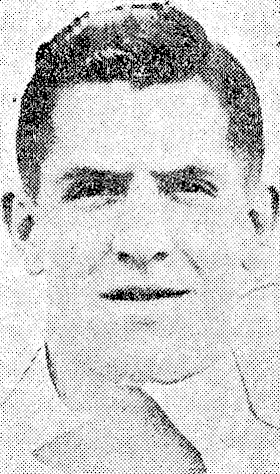

Personal information
- Full name: Stanley Andrews
- Born: 22 November 1912; Christchurch, New Zealand
- Died: 4 October 1979 (aged 66); Christchurch, New Zealand
- Batting: Right-handed
- Bowling: Right-arm fast-medium
- Role: Opening bowler
- Relatives: Bryan Andrews (son)

Domestic team information
- Years: Team
- 1933/34–1935/36: Canterbury

Career statistics
Competition	First-class
Matches	6
Runs scored	23
Batting average	3.83
100s/50s	0/0
Top score	7
Balls bowled	968
Wickets	17
Bowling average	26.17
5 wickets in innings	1
10 wickets in match	0
Best bowling	6/59
Catches/stumpings	6/–
- Source: Cricinfo, 8 January 2024

Stanley Andrews (22 November 1912 – 4 October 1979) was a New Zealand cricketer. He played in six first-class matches for Canterbury between 1933 and 1936. His son Bryan played Test cricket for New Zealand in the 1970s.

After one unsuccessful match in the 1933–34 season, Andrews was one of the leading New Zealand bowlers in 1934–35, helping Canterbury win the Plunket Shield. Canterbury won the first two matches: in the first match, against Auckland, Andrews took 3 for 41 and 2 for 43; in the second, against Wellington, he took 1 for 21 and 6 for 59. He was selected to open the bowling for the South Island team against North Island shortly afterwards, and helped South Island to victory by taking 4 for 53 in the first innings. After that season, he played only one more first-class match.

Andrews also played hockey for New Zealand in the 1930s. Later he was prominent in harness racing in Christchurch as a racehorse owner and as an official. He was president of Canterbury Park Trotting Club and a director of Addington Raceway.
