= Francis Bellamy (cricketer) =

New Zealand cricketer

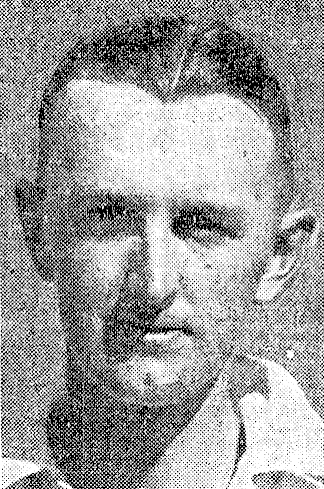

Personal information
- Full name: Francis William James Bellamy
- Born: 31 December 1909; Spreydon, New Zealand
- Died: 19 June 1969 (aged 59); Invercargill, New Zealand
- Batting: Left-handed
- Bowling: Left-arm wrist spin

Domestic team information
- Years: Team
- 1931/32–1938/39: Canterbury
- 1944/45–1945/46: Otago

Career statistics
| Competition | First-class |
|---|---|
| Matches | 26 |
| Runs scored | 1,226 |
| Batting average | 27.24 |
| 100s/50s | 3/3 |
| Top score | 132 |
| Balls bowled | 1,235 |
| Wickets | 11 |
| Bowling average | 47.72 |
| 5 wickets in innings | 1 |
| 10 wickets in match | 0 |
| Best bowling | 5/31 |
| Catches/stumpings | 33/– |
- Source: ESPNcricinfo, 1 January 2024

Francis William James Bellamy (31 December 1909 – 19 June 1969) was a New Zealand cricketer. He played first-class cricket for Canterbury between 1931–32 and 1938–39 and for Otago during and immediately after World War II.

Bellamy played in a total of 26 first-class matches, scoring 1,226 runs and taking 11 wickets. He had his best first-class seasons in 1933–34 and 1934–35: at one stage, in five Plunket Shield matches, he scored three centuries. In Canterbury's 10-wicket victory over Wellington in 1934–35 he scored 113 and 22 not out and took 5 for 31 and 1 for 39. He played one first-class match for South Island in February 1935. He later played one match for Nelson in the 1948–49 Hawke Cup.

Bellamy was born at Spreydon near Christchurch in December 1909. He worked as a publican. He died at Invercargill in June 1969, survived by his wife Alice and a son and a daughter. An obituary was published in the New Zealand Cricket Almanack.
