= Richard Torrance =

New Zealand cricketer and umpire

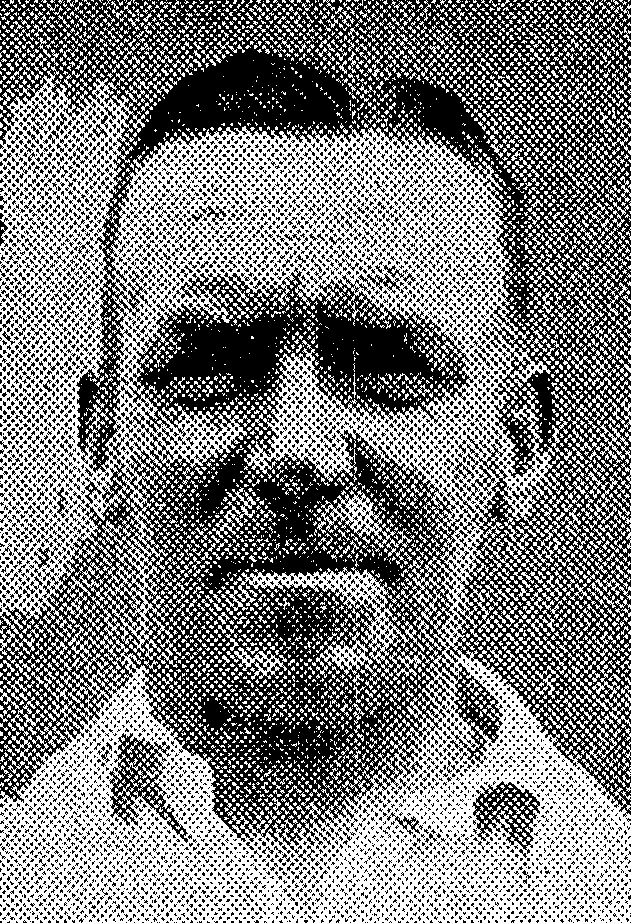
- Torrance in 1935

Personal information
- Full name: Richard Cameron Torrance
- Born: 14 August 1884; Dunedin, Otago, New Zealand
- Died: 28 September 1972 (aged 88); Dunedin, Otago, New Zealand
- Height: 5 ft 8 in (1.73 m)
- Bowling: Left-arm medium
- Role: Bowler

Domestic team information
- Years: Team
- 1905/06–1927/28: Otago

Umpiring information
- Tests umpired: 1 (1933)

Career statistics
Competition	First-class
Matches	42
Runs scored	682
Batting average	11.21
100s/50s	0/0
Top score	43
Balls bowled	11,060
Wickets	176
Bowling average	24.71
5 wickets in innings	13
10 wickets in match	4
Best bowling	7/21
Catches/stumpings	17/–
- Source: Cricinfo, 16 July 2013

Richard Cameron Torrance (14 August 1884 – 28 September 1972) was a New Zealand cricket umpire and player. He stood in one Test match and played 42 first-class matches for Otago between the 1905–06 and 1927–28 seasons.

Torrance was born at Dunedin in Otago in 1884 and worked as a carpenter. He made his senior cricket debut for Otago in December 1905, opening the bowling and taking two wickets against Canterbury at Christchurch. After not playing in the following season for the representative side, he was a fixture in Otago's teams until the end of the 1927–28 season, playing 42 times for the province and taking 176 wickets.

Described as a "very fine left-handed bowler and a forceful batsman", Torrance's best first-class match figures were 42–11–93–14 (7 for 51 and 7 for 42) against Hawke's Bay in the 1908–09 season, when he was the most successful bowler in New Zealand first-class cricket with 28 wickets at an average of 11.57. His best first-class innings figures were 7 for 21 against Southland in 1919–20, when he bowled unchanged through both innings, finishing with match figures of 23.3–8–41–11. He sometimes made useful runs in the lower order, as when in 1925-26 he scored 28 against Canterbury, adding 105 for the last wicket with Reginald Cherry, who was thus able to make his only first-class century. In club cricket, which he played in Dunedin until 1931, he played as an all-rounder.

During World War I Torrance served in Europe with the New Zealand Expeditionary Force as a private. After enlisting in 1916 he served in the Otago Infantry Battalion, arriving at Plymouth in March 1917. He embarked for France at the end of May and in October he was wounded in the shoulder and knee whilst serving on the Western Front. After hospital treatment in the UK he spent the remainder of the war in England and was discharged in February 1919.

Torrance umpired eight first-class matches in New Zealand between 1932 and 1938, including the First Test in 1932–33. He died at Dunedin in 1972 at the age of 88.

== See also ==
- List of Test cricket umpires
