= Adam Powell (cricketer) =

English cricketer

Personal information
- Full name: Adam Gordon Powell
- Born: 17 August 1912; Boxted, Essex, England
- Died: 7 June 1982 (aged 69); Sandwich, Kent, England
- Batting: Right-handed
- Role: Wicketkeeper

Domestic team information
- Years: Team
- 1932–1937: Essex
- 1933-34: Cambridge University
- 1935/6-1950: MCC
- 1946-57: Free Foresters

Career statistics
Competition	FC
Matches	53
Runs scored	1149
Batting average	16.41
100s/50s
Top score	79
Balls bowled
Wickets
Bowling average
5 wickets in innings
10 wickets in match
Best bowling
Catches/stumpings	75/19
- Source: Cricinfo, 20 July 2013

Adam Powell (17 August 1912 – 7 June 1982) was an English cricketer. EW Swanton said he was one of the best amateur wicket-keepers of his time. He played for Essex between 1932 and 1937. His highest score for the county of 62 helped Essex in 1934 to beat Yorkshire for the first time in 24 years. In May 1937 in a game at Chelmsford he fell to the ground while batting against Derbyshire. He retired ill and never played another game for the county.

He was a member of a strong Cambridge University side in 1934 and went on tour to New Zealand and Australia as a member of ERT Holmes' side in 1935-6 sharing wicket-keeping duties with SC Griffith. After World War 2 he captained Suffolk in 1946 to their first Minor Counties Championship beating Buckinghamshire in the play-off game at High Wycombe.

He died a few days after having been taken ill while playing golf.
