= Jim Sims =

English cricketer (1903–1973)

Cricket information
- Batting: Right-handed
- Bowling: Legbreak

International information
- National side: England
- Test debut: 13 July 1935 v South Africa
- Last Test: 1 January 1937 v Australia

Career statistics
Competition	Test	First-class
Matches	4	462
Runs scored	16	8,983
Batting average	4.00	17.30
100s/50s	0/0	4/21
Top score	12	123
Balls bowled	887	77,035
Wickets	11	1,581
Bowling average	43.63	24.92
5 wickets in innings	1	98
10 wickets in match	0	21
Best bowling	5/73	10/90
Catches/stumpings	6/–	252/–
- Source: CricInfo, 7 November 2022

James Morton Sims (13 May 1903 – 27 April 1973) was an English cricketer.

Jim Sims represented Middlesex in 381 first-class matches between 1929 and 1952 as a right-handed batsman and off-break bowler who scored 7173 runs (highest score 121) and took 1,257 wickets (best bowling 9/92). He later coached and scored for the county.

He played in four Tests for England from 1935 to 1937.

He succeeded Jim Alldis as the Middlesex scorer in 1969. He continued in this role until his sudden death from a heart attack in 1973.
