= Plunket Shield =

Cricket competition

- Countries: New Zealand
- Administrator: New Zealand Cricket
- Format: First-class cricket
- First edition: 1906–1907; 119 years ago
- Latest edition: 2025–26
- Next edition: 2026–27
- Tournament format: Round-robin
- Number of teams: 6
- Current champion: Canterbury (21st title)
- Most successful: Auckland (24 titles)
- Most runs: Mathew Sinclair (9,148)
- Most wickets: Stephen Boock (399)

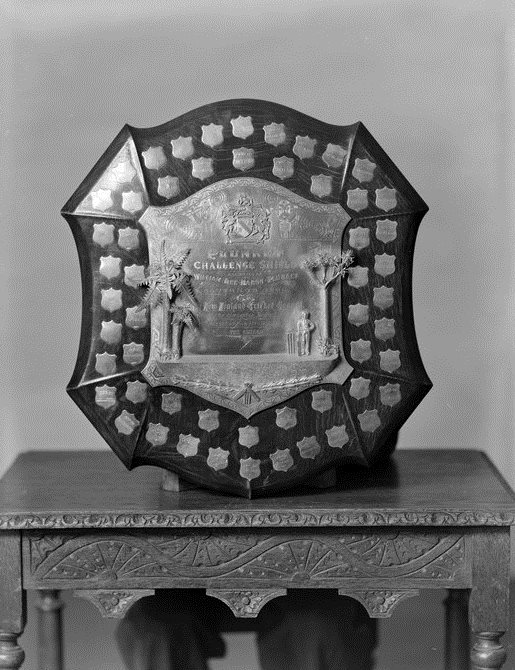
The Plunket Shield

New Zealand has had a domestic first-class cricket championship since the 1906–07 season. Since the 2009–10 season it has been known by its original name of the Plunket Shield.

== History ==
The Plunket Shield competition was instigated in October 1906 with the donation of a shield by William Plunket, 5th Baron Plunket, who was the Governor-General of New Zealand from 1904 to 1910. For the 1906–07 inaugural season, the Shield was allotted by the New Zealand Cricket Council "to the Association whose representative team it considers to have the best record for the season". After the Council awarded the Shield to Canterbury, chiefly because Canterbury were the only provincial team to beat the visiting MCC, Auckland representatives complained that Auckland should have received the Shield as their team was superior but had not had the chance to prove it as none of the other provincial teams had played Auckland during the season.

Beginning with the 1907–08 season, the competition was decided by challenge matches among Auckland, Wellington, Canterbury, Otago and, on two occasions, Hawke's Bay. Auckland defeated Canterbury by an innings in the first challenge match in December 1907.

A proposal in 1912 that the Shield should be decided by an inter-provincial tournament rather than by the challenge system was rejected as impracticable at the time. However, starting with the 1921–22 season, the four principal teams (minus Hawke's Bay, which lost first-class status) played each other in a single round-robin series of matches. Central Districts entered the competition in 1950–51, and Northern Districts in 1956–57.

=== Shell Trophy ===
Shell Oil became principal sponsor in 1974–75 and a new trophy was introduced. Games were played over three days during this period, with an over-limit on the first innings. In latter years the format was experimented with, introducing a shorter second round, various bonus points systems, and eventually a knockout final. During this period the Plunket Shield was contested in occasional games between the North Island and South Island teams – they played a three-day match in December 1977 and one-day matches in the 1981–82, 1993–94 and 1994–95 seasons.

=== State Championship ===
The format and the principal sponsor were changed in 2001–02 season. State Insurance (more commonly just called 'State') replaced Shell Oil. The competitions were renamed to reflect the new sponsor's name, so despite the fact that New Zealand does not have political 'states', the correct name for the first-class competition was the 'State Championship'. Each of the provincial teams played in a single round-robin series of four-day matches. There was a target of 112 overs in each day's play. After the round-robin the two highest-ranked teams played a five-day final.

A List A 50-over competition known as the State Shield was run from late December to the end of January, culminating with a semi-final (second versus third) and final (the semi-final winner against the top qualifier) early in February.

In 2006, a provincial Twenty20 competition was begun, and was played during February and early March. The top two sides qualified for the final. It was called the State Twenty20.

=== Plunket Shield reinstated ===
When State Insurance withdraw from their sponsorship, the Plunket Shield was reinstated for the 2009–10 season. New Zealand Cricket stated that the naming rights were no longer for sale and that the competition would henceforth be known as the Plunket Shield. The final was abolished, meaning that the team with the most points at the end of the competition wins the title.

== Teams ==
Team	Region	Entered competition	Most recent win	Wins (counted since 1921–22 season)
Auckland	Auckland	1906/07	2021/22	24
Wellington	Wellington	1906/07	2023/24	22
Canterbury	Canterbury; West Coast	1906/07	2025/26	21
Otago	Otago; Southland	1906/07	1987/88	13
Central Districts	Hawke's Bay; Taranaki; Manawatū–Whanganui; Horowhenua; Kapiti; Wairarapa; Nelson; Marlborough	1950/51	2022/23	12
Northern Districts	Northland; Counties Manukau; Hamilton; Bay of Plenty; Waikato; Poverty Bay	1956/57	2024/25	9

=== Former teams ===
Hawke's Bay played twice in the Plunket Shield, in the 1914/15 and 1920/21 seasons, losing both matches.

== Points system ==
Points are awarded at the conclusion of each match. With no final, the team with the most points is declared the champion. The points system for the 2023/24 season was as follows:

- Won: 12 points
- Lost: 0 points
- Draw: 0 points
- Tie: 6 points
- Abandoned (without a ball bowled) / No result (drawn one-innings match): 4 points
- Batting points: First innings only up to 110 overs – first point at 200 runs, second point at 250 runs, third point at 300 runs, fourth point at 350 runs
- Bowling points: First innings only up to 110 overs – first point at 3 wickets, second point at 5 wickets, third point at 7 wickets, fourth point at 9 wickets
- Points may deducted for failing to bowl at least 15 overs per hour

If two or more teams are equal at the end of the season, the team with more victories will prevail, and if that does not separate the teams, the team with the higher net average per wicket will prevail.

== Winners ==
The holders of the shield during its "challenge match" period to 1921 were:

Season	Holders	Matches
1906–07	Canterbury	–
1907–08	Auckland	1
1908–09	Auckland	2
1909–10	Auckland	3
1910–11	Auckland, Canterbury	2
1911–12	Canterbury, Auckland	3
1912–13	Auckland, Canterbury	3
1913–14	Canterbury	4
1914–15	Canterbury	4
1915–18	no competition due to World War I	–
1918–19	Wellington, Canterbury	3
1919–20	Canterbury, Auckland	3
1920–21	Auckland, Wellington	3

From the 1921–22 season the competition has been run on a round robin format.

Season	Winner	Runner-up
1921–22	Auckland	Wellington
1922–23	Canterbury	Wellington
1923–24	Wellington	Auckland
1924–25	Otago	Canterbury
1925–26	Wellington	Auckland
1926–27	Auckland	Wellington
1927–28	Wellington	Canterbury
1928–29	Auckland	Wellington
1929–30	Wellington	Auckland
1930–31	Canterbury	Auckland
1931–32	Wellington	Canterbury
1932–33	Otago	Canterbury
1933–34	Auckland	Otago
1934–35	Canterbury	Auckland
1935–36	Wellington	Auckland
1936–37	Auckland	Otago
1937–38	Auckland	Otago
1938–39	Auckland	Canterbury
1939–40	Auckland	Canterbury
1940–45	(not contested due to World War II)	
1945–46	Canterbury	Auckland
1946–47	Auckland	Wellington
1947–48	Otago	Canterbury
1948–49	Canterbury	Otago
1949–50	Wellington	Canterbury
1950–51	Otago	Central Districts
1951–52	Canterbury	Auckland
1952–53	Otago	Central Districts
1953–54	Central Districts	Auckland
1954–55	Wellington	Canterbury
1955–56	Canterbury	Auckland
1956–57	Wellington	Otago
1957–58	Otago	Auckland
1958–59	Auckland	Otago
1959–60	Canterbury	Otago
1960–61	Wellington	Canterbury
1961–62	Wellington	Auckland
1962–63	Northern Districts	Wellington
1963–64	Auckland	Wellington
1964–65	Canterbury	Central Districts
1965–66	Wellington	Canterbury
1966–67	Central Districts	Canterbury
1967–68	Central Districts	Canterbury
1968–69	Auckland	Canterbury
1969–70	Otago	Central Districts
1970–71	Central Districts	Wellington
1971–72	Otago	Auckland
1972–73	Wellington	Auckland
1973–74	Wellington	Canterbury
1974–75	Otago	Canterbury
1975–76	Canterbury	Otago
1976–77	Otago	Central Districts
1977–78	Auckland	Canterbury
1978–79	Otago	Central Districts
1979–80	Northern Districts	Wellington
1980–81	Auckland	Canterbury
1981–82	Wellington	Northern Districts
1982–83	Wellington	Central Districts
1983–84	Canterbury	Central Districts
1984–85	Wellington	Auckland
1985–86	Otago	Auckland
1986–87	Central Districts	Otago
1987–88	Otago	Auckland
1988–89	Auckland	Wellington
1989–90	Wellington	Canterbury
1990–91	Auckland	Canterbury
1991–92	Central Districts & Northern Districts	
1992–93	Northern Districts	Otago
1993–94	Canterbury	Auckland
1994–95	Auckland	Wellington
1995–96	Auckland	Wellington
1996–97	Canterbury	Otago
1997–98	Canterbury	Northern Districts
1998–99	Central Districts	Otago
1999–00	Northern Districts	Auckland
2000–01	Wellington	Northern Districts
2001–02	Auckland	Wellington
2002–03	Auckland	Wellington
2003–04	Wellington	Canterbury
2004–05	Auckland	Wellington
2005–06	Central Districts	Wellington
2006–07	Northern Districts	Canterbury
2007–08	Canterbury	Wellington
2008–09	Auckland	Central Districts
2009–10	Northern Districts	Canterbury
2010–11	Canterbury	Otago
2011–12	Northern Districts	Central Districts
2012–13	Central Districts	Otago
2013–14	Canterbury	Otago
2014–15	Canterbury	Auckland
2015–16	Auckland	Canterbury
2016–17	Canterbury	Northern Districts
2017–18	Central Districts	Wellington
2018–19	Central Districts	Canterbury
2019–20	Wellington	Central Districts
2020–21	Canterbury	Northern Districts
2021–22	Auckland	Canterbury
2022–23	Central Districts	Canterbury
2023–24	Wellington	Northern Districts
2024–25	Northern Districts	Wellington
2025–26	Canterbury	Otago

== Statistics ==
=== Top run scorers and wicket takers by season ===
Batting					Bowling			
Season	Player	Matches	Runs	Average	Player	Matches	Wickets	Average
2025/26	HM Nicholls (Cant)	7	870	96.66	RL Toole (CD)	8	35	23.57
2024/25	NF Kelly (Well)	7	749	57.61	LV van Beek (Well)	8	36	20.63
2023/24	DN Phillips (Ota)	8	686	49.00	NG Smith (Well)	7	33	17.18
2022/23	B Popli (ND)	8	819	63.00	JA Duffy (Ota)	8	32	29.09
2021/22	TC Bruce (CD)	8	858	143.00	BG Randell (ND)	7	31	14.83
2021/22	TC Bruce (CD)	8	858	143.00	NG Smith (Well)	7	31	18.41
2020/21	JF Carter (ND)	8	590	53.63	WSA Williams (Cant)	8	31	17.03
2019/20	DP Conway (Well)	6	701	87.62	JA Duffy (Ota)	5	22	22.86
2018/19	DP Conway (Well)	7	659	82.37	IS Sodhi (ND)	7	36	24.97
2017/18	MHW Papps (Well)	10	814	50.87	AY Patel (CD)	9	48	21.52
2016/17	BS Wilson (Ota)	10	730	45.62	AY Patel (CD)	9	44	30.81
2015/16	B Popli (ND)	10	1149	67.58	AY Patel (CD)	8	43	33.69
2014/15	SJ Murdoch (Well)	10	998	52.52	JA Duffy (Ota)	9	45	24.06
2013/14	TWM Latham (Cant)	7	948	79.00	MR Gillespie (Well)	10	42	32.90
2012/13	AJ Redmond (Ota)	10	941	55.35	BJ Arnel (ND)	10	45	24.84
2012/13	AJ Redmond (Ota)	10	941	55.35	MR Gillespie (Well)	9	45	31.37
2011/12	MS Sinclair (CD)	10	809	53.93	N Wagner (Ota)	10	46	26.32
2010/11	PJ Ingram (CD)	10	858	50.47	N Wagner (Ota)	9	51	18.15
2009/10	LJ Woodcock (Well)	10	988	65.86	GW Aldridge (ND)	9	42	23.04
2008/09	MS Sinclair (CD)	9	904	75.33	TS Nethula (Auck)	8	28	34.60
2007/08	NR Parlane (Well)	9	809	57.78	BJ Arnel (ND)	7	33	20.93
2006/07	MHW Papps (Cant)	7	1005	91.36	IE O'Brien (Well)	7	34	20.85
2005/06	MS Sinclair (CD)	9	723	51.64	MR Gillespie (Well)	8	43	23.16
2004/05	PG Fulton (Cant)	8	828	69.00	KP Walmsley (Auck)	7	38	22.63
2003/04	PG Fulton (Cant)	9	655	43.66	JEC Franklin (Well)	9	36	21.38
2002/03	TG McIntosh (Auck)	10	820	58.57	TK Canning (Auck)	9	46	21.97
2001/02	MHW Papps (Cant)	9	756	54.00	AM Schwass (CD)	9	45	14.73
2000/01	BF Smith (CD)	10	939	58.68	IE O'Brien (Well)	9	41	17.90
1999/00	GP Sulzberger (CD)	5	550	61.11	BP Martin (ND)	6	36	14.36
1998/99	MS Sinclair (CD)	5	463	154.33	AJ Penn (CD)	5	26	16.34
1997/98	MD Bell (Well)	5	574	71.75	AR Tait (ND)	6	29	19.06
1996/97	CD McMillan (Cant)	8	809	73.54	AR Tait (ND)	8	48	15.79
1995/96	MJ Greatbatch (CD)	5	623	155.75	DR Brown (Well)	6	28	15.71
1994/95	RG Twose (Well)	8	720	80.00	HT Davis (Well)	8	34	26.29
1993/94	AC Parore (Auck)	6	499	45.36	MW Priest (Cant)	5	28	16.35
1992/93	DJ Murray (Cant)	8	548	45.66	RP de Groen (ND)	9	46	16.84
1991/92	JJ Crowe (Auck)	10	1063	62.52	NA Mallender (Ota)	9	49	12.30
1990/91	JJ Crowe (Auck)	10	667	44.46	DN Patel (Auck)	10	37	24.70
1989/90	BA Edgar (Well)	10	720	40.00	SJ Roberts (Cant)	10	39	24.38
1988/89	GA Hick (ND)	8	1228	94.46	SL Boock (Ota)	7	32	18.15
1988/89	GA Hick (ND)	8	1228	94.46	BP Bracewell (ND)	7	32	21.50
1987/88	BA Edgar (Well)	8	666	55.50	SL Boock (Ota)	8	41	21.82
1986/87	MD Crowe (CD)	8	1348	103.69	SL Boock (Ota)	8	48	15.41
1985/86	KR Rutherford (Ota)	8	638	53.16	EJ Gray (Well)	8	34	22.00
1984/85	TE Blain (CD)	8	678	48.42	EJ Gray (Well)	7	43	22.41
1983/84	PE McEwan (Cant)	8	713	59.41	GK Robertson (CD)	8	33	19.51
1982/83	BR Blair (Ota)	8	680	52.30	ACS Pigott (Well)	6	33	17.60
1981/82	JG Wright (ND)	7	672	51.69	EJ Chatfield (Well)	7	47	16.87
1980/81	JFM Morrison (Well)	7	599	54.45	SL Boock (Ota)	5	38	17.55
1979/80	PE McEwan (Cant)	7	551	45.91	JG Bracewell (Ota)	7	37	21.64
1978/79	IA Rutherford (Ota)	3	381	76.20	DR O'Sullivan (CD)	3	20	20.40
1977/78	RW Anderson (CD)	2	283	70.75	SL Boock (Ota)	3	21	17.38
1976/77	IA Rutherford (Ota)	3	261	52.20	DJ Kay (CD)	3	24	13.00
1975/76	IA Rutherford (Ota)	3	193	32.16	RJ Hadlee (Cant)	3	16	15.62
1974/75	GM Turner (Ota)	5	703	78.11	HJ Howarth (Auck)	5	31	19.96
1973/74	MG Burgess (Auck)	5	458	65.42	MG Webb (Ota)	5	40	14.65
1972/73	BE Congdon (Ota)	5	501	71.57	HJ Howarth (Auck)	5	37	16.16
1971/72	RW Anderson (Ota)	5	446	49.55	HJ Howarth (Auck)	5	31	21.38
1970/71	RE Redmond (Auck)	5	443	55.37	GD Alabaster (Ota)	5	25	18.84
1969/70	BAG Murray (Well)	4	430	61.42	B Andrews (CD)	5	28	15.96
1968/69	BF Hastings (Cant)	5	432	86.40	RS Cunis (Auck)	5	30	12.60
1967/68	GT Dowling (Cant)	5	467	66.71	RC Motz (Cant)	5	30	14.93
1966/67	GT Dowling (Cant)	5	520	65.00	BW Yuile (CD)	5	29	12.48
1965/66	BW Sinclair (Well)	5	395	56.42	N Puna (ND)	5	34	13.70
1964/65	BF Hastings (Cant)	5	396	56.57	BW Yuile (CD)	5	32	13.59
1963/64	SG Gedye (Auck)	5	382	38.20	RW Blair (Well)	5	37	13.21
1962/63	GT Dowling (Cant)	5	422	46.88	RW Blair (Well)	5	27	15.00
1961/62	BH Pairaudeau (ND)	5	380	38.00	RW Blair (Well)	5	39	9.20
1960/61	B Sutcliffe (Ota)	5	531	66.37	AM Moir (Ota)	5	32	15.90
1959/60	B Sutcliffe (Ota)	5	575	71.87	JC Alabaster (Ota)	5	36	14.08
1958/59	JR Reid (Well)	5	474	59.25	KW Hough (Auck)	5	36	12.13
1957/58	LSM Miller (Well)	5	423	47.00	JA Hayes (Auck)	5	42	11.38
1956/57	MB Poore (Cant)	5	377	41.88	RW Blair (Well)	5	46	9.47
1955/56	LSM Miller (Well)	4	429	61.28	RW Blair (CD)	4	34	16.79
1954/55	RT Dowker (Cant)	4	366	45.75	RW Blair (Well)	4	27	14.44
1953/54	JW Guy (CD)	4	451	56.37	AM Moir (Ota)	4	34	18.11
1952/53	B Sutcliffe (Ota)	4	683	97.57	FE Fisher (Well)	4	29	10.20
1951/52	JR Reid (Well)	4	472	59.00	TB Burtt (Cant)	4	29	14.37
1950/51	B Sutcliffe (Ota)	4	610	87.14	TB Burtt (Cant)	4	38	12.94
1949/50	B Sutcliffe (Ota)	3	569	113.80	GWF Overton (Ota)	3	17	19.00
1948/49	B Sutcliffe (Auck)	3	348	87.00	AE Cresswell (Well)	3	19	14.26
1947/48	B Sutcliffe (Ota)	3	532	88.66	TB Burtt (Cant)	3	23	22.78
1946/47	B Sutcliffe (Auck)	3	339	84.75	JH Parks (Cant)	3	19	23.57
1945/46	VJ Scott (Auck)	3	285	95.00	J Cowie (Auck)	3	17	14.11
1939/40	VJ Scott (Auck)	3	316	79.00	TL Pritchard (Well)	3	23	17.56
1938/39	REJ Menzies (Cant)	3	318	63.60	HG Vivian (Auck)	3	21	16.66
1937/38	KFM Uttley (Ota)	3	420	70.00	JA Dunning (Ota)	3	20	17.60
1936/37	WN Carson (Auck)	3	500	125.00	J Cowie (Auck)	3	19	12.63
1935/36	WM Wallace (Auck)	3	335	67.00	WE Merritt (Cant)	3	31	17.03
1934/35	PE Whitelaw (Auck)	3	384	76.80	LF Townsend (Auck)	3	24	13.91
1933/34	FWJ Bellamy (Cant)	3	333	55.50	JA Dunning (Ota)	3	22	18.90
1932/33	KC James (Well)	3	269	44.83	FT Badcock (Ota)	3	21	14.80
1931/32	RC Blunt (Ota)	3	385	77.00	J Newman (Well)	3	22	15.40
1930/31	HM McGirr (Well)	3	388	64.66	WE Merritt (Cant)	3	19	21.00
1929/30	JE Mills (Auck)	3	325	81.25	AF Wensley (Auck)	3	15	21.66
1928/29	RC Blunt (Ota)	3	404	67.33	M Henderson (Well)	3	15	28.33
1927/28	EH Bowley (Auck)	3	359	59.83	RJ Read (Cant)	3	17	21.88
1927/28	EH Bowley (Auck)	3	359	59.83	WE Merritt (Cant)	3	17	27.52
1926/27	JS Hiddleston (Well)	3	310	51.66	EH Bowley (Auck)	3	19	19.68
1926/27	JS Hiddleston (Well)	3	310	51.66	RJ Read (Cant)	3	19	21.57
1925/26	JS Hiddleston (Well)	3	537	107.40	FT Badcock (Well)	3	23	11.69
1924/25	WR Patrick (Cant)	3	307	51.16	FT Badcock (Well)	3	28	17.50
1923/24	RVD Worker (Ota)	3	515	85.83	AW Alloo (Ota)	3	24	25.25
1922/23	HHL Kortlang (Well)	3	288	72.00	RJ Read (Cant)	3	20	18.40
1921/22	JS Hiddleston (Well)	3	308	61.60	DR Garrard (Auck)	3	23	10.34

Number of occasions player was top run-scorer in a Plunket Shield season
Occasions	Player
6	B Sutcliffe (Auck & Ota)
4	MS Sinclair (CD)
3	GT Dowling (Cant)
3	IA Rutherford (Ota)
3	JS Hiddleston (Well)
3	MHW Papps (Cant)

Number of occasions player was top wicket-taker in a Plunket Shield season
Occasions	Player
6	RW Blair (CD & Well)
4	SL Boock (Ota)
3	JA Duffy (Ota)
3	AY Patel (CD)
3	HJ Howarth (Auck)
3	MR Gillespie (Well)
3	TB Burtt (Cant)

=== Record for most runs and wickets in a single season ===
Most runs in a season:
Season	Player	Province	Matches	Runs	Average
1986/87	MD Crowe	CD	8	1348	103.69

Most wickets in a season:
Season	Player	Province	Matches	Wickets	Average
2010/11	N Wagner	Otago	9	51	18.15

=== Most career runs ===
Most Career Runs in Plunket Shield:
Player	Province	Matches	Runs	Average	Span
MHW Papps	Canterbury / Wellington	163	11463	41.53	1998/99 - 2016/17
MS Sinclair	Central Districts	115	8842	52.01	1995/96 - 2012/13
PG Fulton	Canterbury	121	8719	43.16	2000/01 - 2016/17
JA Raval	Auckland / CD / ND	120	8693	39.33	2008/09 - 2025/26
CD Cumming	Canterbury / Otago	117	7738	40.94	1995/96 - 2011/12
NT Broom	Canterbury / Otago	127	7726	40.24	2002/03 - 2021/22
LJ Woodcock	Wellington	143	7719	35.74	2001/02 - 2018/19
MD Bell	Northern Districts / Wellington	114	7518	40.86	1993/94 - 2010/11
B Sutcliffe	Auckland / Otago / ND	84	7286	53.57	1941/42 - 1965/66
BA Edgar	Wellington	85	6311	43.83	1975/76 - 1989/90
JAH Marshall	Northern Districts	125	6267	32.30	1997/98 - 2012/13
DR Flynn	Northern Districts	100	6265	37.74	2004/05 - 2019/20
RH Vance	Wellington	114	6211	34.89	1976/77 - 1990/91
RJ Nicol	Auckland / Canterbury / Otago	122	6012	33.22	2001/02 - 2017/18

=== Highest batting averages ===
Highest Batting Average (minimum 2000 runs):
Player	Province	Matches	Runs	Average	Span
DP Conway*	Wellington	23	2118	64.18	2017/18 - 2024/25
VJ Scott	Auckland	39	3920	63.27	1937/38 - 1952/53
MD Crowe	Auckland / CD / Wellington	63	5460	57.47	1979/80 - 1994/95
C Munro	Auckland	42	3440	57.33	2006/07 - 2017/18
CZ Harris	Canterbury	82	5202	55.94	1989/90 - 2009/10
B Sutcliffe	Auckland / Otago / ND	84	7286	53.57	1941/42 - 1965/66
LSM Miller	Central Districts / Wellington	28	2233	53.17	1950/51 - 1959/60
MS Sinclair	Central Districts	115	8842	52.01	1995/96 - 2012/13
KS Williamson*	Northern Districts	27	2105	51.34	2007/08 - 2025/26
WM Wallace	Auckland	40	2782	50.58	1933/34 - 1956/57

*up to end of 2025/26 season

=== Most career wickets ===
Most career wickets in Plunket Shield (minimum 300 wickets):
Player	Province	Matches	Wickets	Average	Span
SL Boock	Otago / Canterbury	101	492	19.82	1973/74-1989/90
N Wagner	Otago / Northern Districts	89	371	26.46	2008/09-2024/25
EJ Chatfield	Wellington	79	370	19.06	1973/74-1989/90
DR O'Sullivan	Central Districts	84	368	27.40	1972/73-1984/85
GW Aldridge	Northern Districts	119	355	28.32	1998/99-2014/15
BJ Arnel	Northern Districts / Wellington	98	354	26.28	2005/06-2017/18
RW Blair	Wellington / Central Districts	59	352	14.73	1951/52-1964/65
EJ Gray	Wellington	117	352	27.40	1975/76-1991/92
MR Gillespie	Wellington	82	344	27.29	1999/00-2014/15
SC Kuggeleijn*	Wellington / Northern Districts	99	332	29.88	2011/12-2025/26
JS Patel	Wellington	133	331	37.84	1999/00-2018/19
BP Martin	Northern Districts / Auckland	103	308	36.75	1999/00-2013/14
TD Astle	Canterbury	105	303	31.37	2005/06-2019/20
HJ Howarth	Auckland	74	300	22.37	1963/64-1978/79

=== Best bowling averages ===
Best Bowling Average (minimum 100 wickets):
	Player	Province	Matches	Wickets	Average	Span
1	RW Blair	Wellington / Central Districts	59	352	14.73	1951/52 - 1964/65
2	RJ Hadlee	Canterbury	58	270	15.69	1971/72 - 1988/89
3	CJ Drum	Auckland	30	120	17.92	1996/97 - 2001/02
4	BW Yuile	Central Districts / Canterbury	52	213	18.40	1959/60 - 1971/72
5	EJ Chatfield	Wellington	79	370	19.06	1973/74 - 1989/90
6	RC Motz	Canterbury	65	226	19.23	1957/58 - 1968/69
7	RO Collinge	Wellington / CD / ND	64	247	19.30	1963/64 - 1977/78
8	DR Hadlee	Canterbury	38	190	19.75	1969/70 - 1983/84
9	SL Boock	Otago / Canterbury	101	492	19.82	1973/74 - 1989/90
10	AR Tait	Northern Districts	25	110	19.83	1994/95 - 2000/01
11	FJ Cameron	Otago	65	248	19.86	1952/53 - 1966/67
12	NA Mallender	Otago	46	212	19.88	1983/84 - 1992/93

== See also ==
- The Ford Trophy
- Hallyburton Johnstone Shield
- Men's Super Smash
- Women's Super Smash
