= Errol Holmes =

English cricketer

- Errol Holmes, captain of MCC in 1935–36

Personal information
- Full name: Errol Reginald Thorold Holmes
- Born: 21 August 1905; Calcutta, British India
- Died: 16 August 1960 (aged 54); London, England
- Batting: Right-handed
- Bowling: Right-arm medium-fast

International information
- National side: England
- Test debut: 8 January 1935 v West Indies
- Last Test: 29 June 1935 v South Africa

Career statistics
Competition	Test	FC
Matches	5	301
Runs scored	114	13,598
Batting average	16.28	32.84
100s/50s	0/1	24/67
Top score	85*	236
Balls bowled	108	18,297
Wickets	2	283
Bowling average	38.00	33.67
5 wickets in innings	0	4
10 wickets in match	0	0
Best bowling	1/10	6/16
Catches/stumpings	4/–	192/–
- Source: Cricinfo, 25 January 2022

Errol Reginald Thorold Holmes (21 August 1905 – 16 August 1960) was an English cricketer who played first-class cricket for Oxford University, Surrey and England between 1924 and 1955.

A dashing right-handed batsman, Holmes believed that cricket was to be enjoyed and was an important figure in restoring the reputation of English cricket after the Bodyline controversy of the early 1930s. He succeeded the Bodyline captain Douglas Jardine as captain of Surrey in 1934 and resolutely refused to use short-pitched bowling in county matches. He also captained the "goodwill" Marylebone Cricket Club (MCC) non-Test tour to Australia and New Zealand in 1935–36.

== Schools ==
Holmes attended Park View School in South Godstone, Surrey, and St Andrew's School, Eastbourne, before going to Malvern College in Worcestershire in 1919, where he was coached at cricket by Charles Toppin. In a school match in 1922 he took 10 for 36 in an innings. He captained the First XI in 1923 and 1924. He first played for Surrey in 1924 before going up to Trinity College, Oxford.

== Oxford ==
Holmes came to prominence as a hard-hitting batsman for Oxford University from 1925 to 1927, also playing a few matches for Surrey and for the Gentlemen against the Players. He also bowled fast-medium, though it was reported that his run-up tended to be rather more fearsome than the bowling that resulted from it.

He gained blues in football and cricket in his first year. At a time when, he said, it was "desirable but by no means essential" for an Oxbridge student to finish with a degree, he approached his studies light-heartedly and did not sit for his exams in his final year, preferring to concentrate on his captaincy of the Oxford cricket team. He scored a century in the match against Cambridge, but Oxford lost. In the match against Free Foresters a few weeks earlier he had scored 236, including four sixes off four balls, and declared at the end of the first day when Oxford had made 520 for 8. During the General Strike of 1926 he served as a postman, delivering mail in his Darracq to the villages around Oxford.

He toured Jamaica in February and March 1927 in a team captained by the Hon. L. H. Tennyson that played three first-class matches against Jamaica.

== Business and cricket career ==
After Oxford, Holmes left first-class cricket to work on the Stock Exchange. He worked for several companies in London, and also spent six months in 1930 at the New York Stock Exchange. He played only a few first-class matches in 1928 and 1929, and none from then until 1934, when H. D. G. Leveson Gower, who was President of Surrey, accosted him in Throgmorton Street and in the course of conversation asked him to take over the county's captaincy.

He was an instant success, making 1,000 runs in each of the next four seasons and being appointed vice-captain on the MCC tour of the West Indies in 1934–35, where he played in all four Test matches. He made his highest Test score of 85 not out in the Second Test, going to the wicket at 95 for 6 and seeing the score through to 258 all out. He had to take over the captaincy midway through the Fourth Test after the captain, Bob Wyatt, had his jaw broken by a fast ball from Manny Martindale.

He also played one Test at Lord's in the 1935 series against South Africa, and was chosen to lead the non-Test tour of Australia and New Zealand in 1935–36. Business commitments led him to make himself unavailable for the 1936–37 tour to Australia under Gubby Allen, and he retired from the Surrey captaincy to resume his business career after the 1938 season. He was a Wisden Cricketer of the Year in 1936.

== War service ==
During World War II, Holmes was an officer in the Royal Artillery, achieving the rank of Major. He was described as a "flak expert". He flew as British flak liaison officer with the first American bomber mission against the German naval base at Wilhelmshaven. When the waist gunner of his aircraft was injured, Holmes took his place, but did not have any opportunity to fire the weapon. He was awarded the US DFC in 1948 for his services during the war, having been the flak liaison officer with the 1st Bomb Wing/Division during all their operations over Europe.

== Later career ==
After the war, Holmes was persuaded back to Surrey as captain for two further seasons from 1947, and as late as 1955, at the age of 49, he came back to captain Surrey in one match against Oxford University, batting at number nine and scoring 49 runs. In retirement, he sat on MCC and Surrey committees. Not everyone was a fan of Holmes. Jim Laker said "One man really summed up all that was wrong with the English cricket world in 1945. That was Surrey's captain Errol Holmes. He very nearly made me leave the game before I had started."

He published his autobiography, Flannelled Foolishness: A Cricketing Chronicle, in 1957. He died in hospital in August 1960 after a heart attack. Sir Jack Hobbs, who played alongside him and served with him on the Surrey committee, wrote that Holmes "was a true sportsman and a lovable fellow", "a fine attacking batsman" who "set a fine personal example in the field" and "would not tolerate anything shady or underhanded".
