= English cricket team in New Zealand in 1929–30 =

International cricket tour

The England national cricket team toured Ceylon, Australia and New Zealand in the 1929–30 season to play a Test series against the New Zealand national cricket team. This was the first Test series ever played by New Zealand. England began the tour in October 1929 in Ceylon with a single minor match and then in Australia where they played five first-class matches. The New Zealand leg of the tour began in December and, in addition to the Test series, England played each of the main provincial teams: Auckland, Wellington, Canterbury and Otago. England, captained by Harold Gilligan, won the Test series 1–0 with three matches drawn.

At the same time another English team, captained by Freddie Calthorpe, was touring the West Indies, playing the first Test series there. It was the only time one country has played in two Test matches on the same day.

== The English team ==
- Harold Gilligan (captain)
- Guy Earle (vice-captain)
- Maurice Allom
- Fred Barratt
- Edward Benson
- Ted Bowley
- Walter Cornford
- Eddie Dawson
- K. S. Duleepsinhji
- Geoffrey Legge
- Stan Nichols
- Maurice Turnbull
- Frank Woolley
- Stan Worthington

Apart from Woolley, who had played 55 Tests before the tour, it was an inexperienced side at Test level. Bowley had played two Tests, and Barratt, Dawson, Duleepsinhji and Legge one each; the other eight had not played a Test. There were eight amateurs and six professionals.

The team was selected in late June, with Arthur Gilligan, who had played 11 Tests, as captain. However, he was unable to tour owing to illness, and his younger brother Harold was selected to replace him. The other change to the original selected team was that Maurice Allom replaced Frank Watson.

== Test Matches ==
=== First Test ===
10–13 January 1930
Scorecard

New Zealand	v	England
112 (47.1 overs); Roger Blunt 47; Maurice Allom 5/38 (19 overs)		181 (63.1 overs); Duleepsinhji 49; Roger Blunt 3/17 (11.1 overs)
131 (60.3 overs); Tom Lowry 40; Maurice Allom 3/17 (15 overs)		66/2 (18.5 overs); Duleepsinhji 33*; Roger Blunt 2/17 (7 overs)

England won by 8 wickets
Lancaster Park, Christchurch
Umpires: William Butler (NZ) and Kenneth Cave (NZ)

- New Zealand won the toss and elected to bat.
- New Zealand's first ever Test.
- All eleven New Zealand players made their Test debuts: (Ted Badcock, Roger Blunt, Stewie Dempster, George Dickinson, Henry Foley, Matt Henderson, Ken James, Tom Lowry, Bill Merritt, Curly Page, and Alby Roberts).
- Six England players made their Test debuts: (Maurice Allom, Tich Cornford, Harold Gilligan, Stan Nichols, Maurice Turnbull, and Stan Worthington).
- On debut Maurice Allom took four wickets in five deliveries in the first innings including a hat-trick (Tom Lowry (lbw), Ken James (c Tich Cornford), and Ted Badcock (b)).
- Matt Henderson took a wicket with his first ball in Test cricket.

=== Second Test ===
24–27 January 1930
Scorecard

New Zealand	v	England
440 (136.3 overs); Stewie Dempster 136; Frank Woolley 7/76 (28.3 overs)		320 (107.5 overs); Stan Nichols 78*; Ted Badcock 4/80 (36 overs)
166/4d (53 overs); Stewie Dempster 80*; Frank Woolley 2/48 (23 overs)		107/4 (39 overs); Duleepsinhji 56*; Lindsay Weir 1/1 (2 overs)

Match drawn
Basin Reserve, Wellington
Umpires: Kenneth Cave (NZ) and Thomas Cobcroft (NZ)

- New Zealand won the toss and elected to bat.
- Three players debuted for New Zealand - Eddie McLeod, Jackie Mills, and Lindsay Weir.
- Stewie Dempster's 136 in the first innings was the first Test century by a New Zealander.
- Stewie Dempster and Jackie Mills' 276 run opening partnership was the highest for New Zealand and third highest ever in Test cricket.
- Frank Woolley passed 3000 Test runs, becoming the second English player and fourth player in Test cricket to pass the mark.

=== Third Test ===
14–17 February 1930
Scorecard

England	v	New Zealand
330/4d (88 overs); KS Duleepsinhji 117; WE Merritt 2/119 (28 overs)		96/1 (34 overs); CS Dempster 62*; F Barratt 1/26 (12 overs)

Match drawn
Eden Park, Auckland
Umpires: KH Cave and LT Cobcroft

- New Zealand won the toss and elected to field.
- 16 February was taken as a rest day
- There was no play on the first or second day. Therefore, a fourth Test was arranged.
- CFW Allcott and HM McGirr (both NZ) made their Test debuts.

=== Fourth Test ===
21–24 February 1930
Scorecard

England	v	New Zealand
540 (171.4 overs); GB Legge 196; RC Blunt 2/61 (21 overs)		387 (166.1 overs); TC Lowry 80; MJC Allom 4/42 (26.1 overs)
22/3 (12.3 overs); MS Nichols 7* AM Matheson 2/7 (5 overs)

Match drawn
Eden Park, Auckland
Umpires: KH Cave and LT Cobcroft

- England won the toss and elected to bat.
- 23 February was taken as a rest day.
- AM Matheson (NZ) made his Test debut.

== Assessments ==
The tour made a small profit for the New Zealand Cricket Council, despite the unusually wet summer, but some of this profit had to be used to pay the English team's professionals. The council's chairman, Arthur Donnelly, declared that the English team were "the most agreeable and pleasant lot of fellows" the council had ever dealt with.

In its report of the tour, The Cricketer said the New Zealand batting was strong, but the bowling and fielding needed substantial improvement. It said the general standard of cricket throughout New Zealand was rising, "but except in the Test matches the placing of the field was none too good, and the bowlers suffered accordingly. The umpiring, apart from the Tests, was only moderate."
