= Shabden Park =

Nature reserve in Surrey, England

Coordinates: 51.292°N 0.175°W

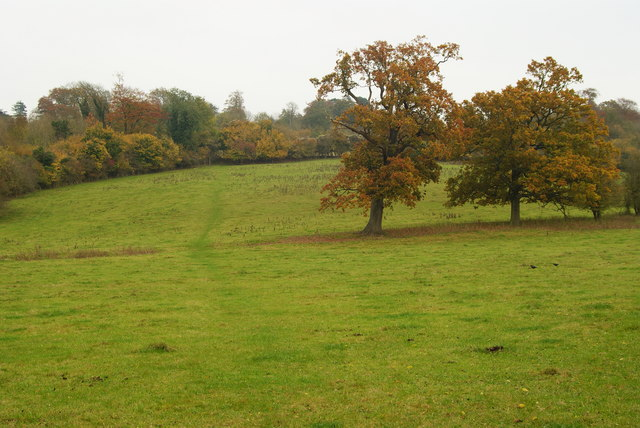
- Interactive map of Shabden Park
- Type: Nature reserve
- Location: Chipstead, Surrey
- OS grid: TQ 274 563
- Area: 103 hectares (250 acres)
- Manager: Surrey Wildlife Trust

Shabden Park is a 103-hectare (250-acre) nature reserve in Chipstead in Surrey. It is owned by Surrey County Council who manage the woodland areas, while the Surrey Wildlife Trust manage the grassland. The park is part of the Chipstead Downs Site of Special Scientific Interest.

This is a working farm which has wildflower meadows on chalk grassland together with areas of woodland. It has a nationally scarce species of mining bee and other fauna include Roesel's bush-cricket and a variety of birds and butterflies.

There is access to footpaths through the farm only.

== History ==
The earliest records of Shabden Park are from 1263, when "Alured de Shepinden" is recorded as living there and the Surrey Subsidy Rolls of 1332 mention "Walter de Shependen" as a resident. The name "Shabden" is thought to mean "sheep hill", the "–den" suffix having a similar derivation to the Old English: dun. During the late medieval period, the land is thought to have been divided between two copyhold tenancies.

John Fanshawe, father of the poet, Catherine Maria Fanshawe, bought Shabden Park in the early 1760s. By this time, the estate covered around 500 acres (200 ha) and the mansion was the largest house in Chipstead. Fanshawe was responsible for creating the Long Plantation, along the boundary with the neighbouring Eyhurst estate, and may also have planted Tickner's and Poorfield Woods. He is also thought to have commissioned the building of the house depicted in a painting by John Hassell in 1821.

On Fanshawe's death in 1816, Shabden Park was bought by Archibald Little. The 1841 census records six members of his family (two of whom were soldiers) living in the mansion, along with 14 servants. After Little's death in 1844, the estate was owned by John Cattley, a director of Royal Exchange Assurance. His son, John Garrett Cattley, who inherited Shabden in 1862, commissioned Edward Middleton Barry to rebuild and enlarge the existing mansion house. The architectural critics, Nikolaus Pevsner and Ian Nairn, describe Barry's house as being "very Victorian" and the style as being "uncompromising symmetrical French Renaissance", also noting the "elephantine timber porch".

The final private owner was Horace Brooks Marshall, a newspaper publisher who served as Lord Mayor of London in 1918–19. Marshall developed shooting on the estate. After Marshall's death in 1936, the mansion and the surrounding 560 acres (230 ha) of land were offered for sale. Surrey County Council bought Shabden Park for £65,000 that December, turning the mansion into a geriatric hospital for elderly ladies. Around half of the estate, comprising 275 acres (111 ha) of agricultural land, was leased to London County Council. In the late 1970s, the geriatric hospital closed and Surrey County Council divided the house into apartments, which were each allocated a share of the grounds.

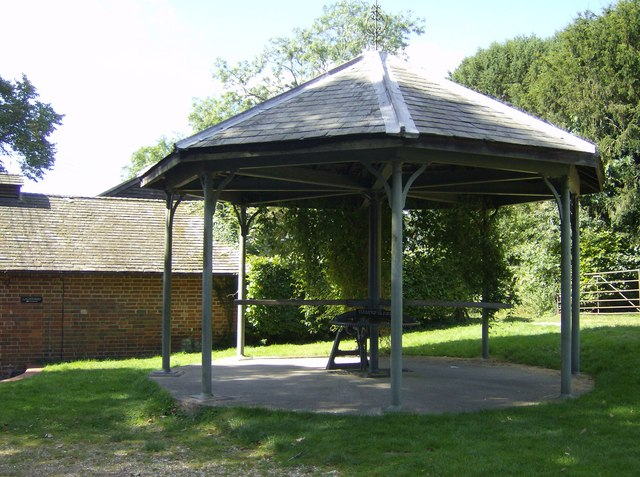
The Shabden Park horse wheel at Greys Court in 2007

A horse wheel, originally installed at Shabden Park in the 1870s, was relocated to Greys Court in Oxfordshire in the early 1970s. A ceremony to mark the completion of the project to restore the wheel took place on 8 June 1975.

== Notable residents ==
- Catherine Maria Fanshawe (1765–1834) poet – born at Shabden Park
- Horace Brooks Marshall (1865–1936) newspaper publisher and Lord Mayor of London – lived at Shabden Park from 1910 until his death

== Bibliography ==
- Gover, J.E.B; Mawer, A.; Stenton, F.M. (1969) [1934]. The Place-names of Surrey. Cambridge: Cambridge University Press.
- Nairn, Ian; Pevsner, Nikolaus (1962). Surrey. The Buildings of England. Harmondsworth: Penguin Books.
- Pringle, C.E. (1984). A History of Chipstead. Chipstead: Chipstead Village Preservation Society. ISBN 978-0-95-095200-0.
