= Alice Martineau =

English pop singer and songwriter (1972–2003)

- Born: Alice Katherine Martineau; 8 June 1972; Merton, Surrey, England
- Died: 6 March 2003 (aged 30) Kensington, London, England
- Genre: Pop
- Occupations: Singer-songwriter, musician
- Instrument: Vocals
- Years active: 2002–2003
- Label: Epic

Alice Katherine Martineau (8 June 1972 – 6 March 2003) was an English pop singer and songwriter.

== Early life ==
Martineau was born in Merton to parents David Nicholas Nettlefold Martineau (a retired judge) and Elizabeth Allom. Her older brother, Luke, is an artist and painter. Martineau played both the piano and the flute as a child, developing a passion for songwriting and performing after taking singing lessons.

Martineau was born with cystic fibrosis, a genetic disorder that causes chronic lung and digestive problems. During her early childhood, she had to go on a special high-fat diet, take antibiotics, and undergo physiotherapy.

=== Ancestry ===
On her father's side, Martineau was of French descent and was a descendant of the prominent Martineau family, known for its intellectual prowess, business ventures, and political influence, with many members being knighted. Her great grandfather was fencer Sydney Martineau. Her fifth great grandfather was third generation surgeon David Martineau; her sixth cousin once removed is Catherine, Princess of Wales.

On her mother's side, her maternal uncles are record producer Tom Allom, who has worked on albums for Judas Priest and Def Leppard, and cricketer Anthony Allom. Her maternal grandfather Maurice Allom also played cricket. Her great-great-great grandfather was architect and illustrator Thomas Allom. Her great grand uncle was decorator Charles Allom.

== Education ==
In 1993, she attended the University of Warwick to study English, but was forced to drop out two weeks later after developing a lung infection. She later switched to King's College London, where she graduated with a first-class honours degree in English.

== Career ==
=== Modelling ===
After graduation, Martineau began working as a model. Fearing that her condition would lower her chances of getting a deal, Martineau would hide her condition by arriving at the modelling agencies early and leaving late so that she wouldn't appear "breathless". Because she had a co-ordination problem when walking (due to a vitamin deficiency), she wore shoes at the interviews. She was eventually signed to work for an agency that specialises in models with "unusual features". Because she was only 5 feet 7 inches (1.70 m) tall, Martineau did not model on catwalks. Instead, she did photo sessions and appeared in teen magazines such as Just 17 and Jackie.

Before commencing a career as a singer-songwriter in her mid-twenties, Martineau appeared as an extra in various music videos, filmed adverts for MTV and appeared on television on Richard & Judy.

=== Musical career ===
Due to her belief that her condition would prevent her from singing, Martineau did not initially pursue her musical ambitions; however, following singing lessons, it became apparent that her constant coughing had actually strengthened her diaphragm. Despite her worsening health, she played live gigs regularly in London until 2001 and was offered record deals by several companies, only to have them withdrawn when executives discovered that she was seriously ill and on the waiting list for heart, lung and liver transplants.

In 2002, Martineau wrote an article in The Daily Telegraph's Saturday magazine about her wait for a life-saving triple transplant. The next day, her manager approached Sony Music with a demo tape and she was signed to their label in late 2002. Martineau completed this debut album quickly, as most songs had already been written over the previous three years. Her debut single, "If I Fall", was released on 11 November 2002. The music video was filmed in Wraysbury. The album Daydreams was released a week later on 18 November. Tracks on the album were produced by a number of people, including Marius De Vries. A promotional preview CD containing one track from her album and four short previews was also circulated.

Sony had planned to release a second single, "The Right Time" on 10 February 2003 but decided to cancel the release due to Martineau's poor health.

== Personal life ==
Martineau remained on the waiting list for a triple heart, lung and liver transplant for more than a year and a half before dying at home on the morning of 6 March 2003. A documentary, The Nine Lives of Alice Martineau, was made by the BBC Television several months before her death and broadcast shortly after her death.

On 9 February 2017, A Song for Tomorrow by Alice Peterson was published by Simon & Schuster. The novel was inspired by Martineau's life story and follows the journey of Alice, a woman with cystic fibrosis.

== Discography ==
=== Album ===
- Daydreams (November 2002)

=== Singles ===
- "If I Fall" (November 2002)
- "The Right Time" (unreleased)
