= English cricket team in New Zealand in 1932–33 =

International cricket tour

Douglas Jardine's England national cricket team toured New Zealand in March 1933 as an afterword to their "bodyline" tour of Australia. England and New Zealand played a two-match Test series. New Zealand were captained by Curly Page. Both Tests were drawn. The second Test of the series, at Auckland, was the 200th Test match to be played by England.

== Test series summary ==
=== First Test ===
24–27 March 1933
Scorecard

England	v	New Zealand
560/8d (147.3 overs); WR Hammond 227; FT Badcock 3/142 (54 overs)		223 (116.1 overs); GL Weir 66; W Voce 3/27 (17.1 overs)
		35/0 (f/o) (16.1 overs); PE Whitelaw 17*

Match drawn
Lancaster Park, Christchurch
Umpires: TW Burgess and RC Torrance

- England won the toss and elected to bat.
- 26 March was taken as a rest day
- PE Whitelaw, HD Smith and DL Freeman (all NZ) made their Test debuts.

=== Second Test ===
31 March–3 April 1933
Scorecard

New Zealand	v	England
158 (56.5 overs); CS Dempster 83*; WE Bowes 6/34 (19 overs)		548/7d (156 overs); WR Hammond 336*; GL Weir 2/39 (11 overs)
16/0 (8.3 overs); JE Mills 11*

Match drawn
Eden Park, Auckland
Umpires: KH Cave and JT Forrester

- New Zealand won the toss and elected to bat.
- 2 April was taken as a rest day.
- JA Dunning (NZ) made his Test debut.

Wally Hammond's score of 336 not out in the second Test was the highest individual score in a Test match, breaking the record of 334 set by Don Bradman three years earlier.
