= Oswald Norris =

English cricketer and soldier

Personal information
- Full name: Oswald Thomas Norris
- Born: 1 July 1883; Chipstead, Surrey, England
- Died: 22 March 1973 (aged 89); Pease Pottage, Sussex, England
- Batting: Right-handed
- Bowling: Right-arm slow
- Relatives: Anthony Allom (grandson); Maurice Allom (son-in-law)

Domestic team information
- Years: Team
- 1904–1905: Oxford University

Career statistics
Competition	First-class
Matches	11
Runs scored	413
Batting average	20.65
100s/50s	–/3
Top score	87
Balls bowled	474
Wickets	4
Bowling average	68.00
5 wickets in innings	–
10 wickets in match	–
Best bowling	2/109
Catches/stumpings	7/–
- Source: Cricinfo, 28 March 2020

Oswald Thomas Norris CBE (1 July 1883 – 22 March 1973) was an English first-class cricketer and a wine and spirits merchant.

Norris was born in July 1883 at Chipstead, Surrey. He was educated at Charterhouse School, before going up to Oriel College, Oxford. While studying at Oxford, he played first-class cricket for Oxford University in 1904 and 1905, making eleven appearances. In his eleven matches, he scored a total of 413 runs at an average of 20.65, with high score of 87 which was one of three half centuries he made. With his right-arm slow bowling, he took 4 wickets with best figures of 2 for 109.

After graduating from Oxford, he went into business as a wine and spirits merchant, forming the partnership Portal, Dingwall and Norris in July 1910. He served in the First World War with the Royal Army Service Corps, being commissioned as a second lieutenant in October 1916. Following the war, he resumed his business as a wine and spirits merchant. In 1926, he invested in the port house Fonseca. He was the chairman of council for the National Federation of Young Farmers' Clubs, for which he was honoured with an CBE in the 1957 New Year Honours. Norris died in March 1973 at Pease Pottage, Sussex. His grandson Anthony Allom was also a first-class cricketer, while his son-in-law, Maurice Allom, played Test cricket.
