= Allom =

Allom is a surname. Notable people with the surname include:

- Anthony Allom (born 1938), English cricketer
- Sir Charles Carrick Allom (1865–1947), British decorator
- Maurice James Carrick Allom (1906–1995), English cricketer
- Thomas Allom (1804–1872), English architect, artist, and topographical illustrator
- Tom Allom, English sound engineer and record producer

== See also ==
- Allom Cup
