= John Scaife =

Australian cricketer (1908–95)

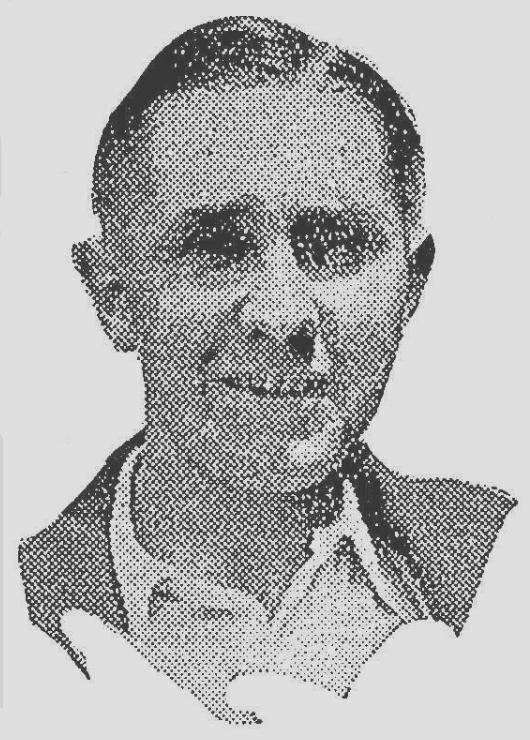

Personal information
- Full name: John Willie Scaife
- Born: 14 November 1908; Haslingden, Lancashire, England
- Died: 27 October 1995 (aged 86); Melbourne, Victoria
- Batting: Right-handed

Domestic team information
- Years: Team
- 1926-27 to 1935-36: Victoria
- 1936-37: Europeans

Career statistics
Competition	First-class
Matches	46
Runs scored	2206
Batting average	33.93
100s/50s	2/13
Top score	120
Balls bowled
Wickets	1
Bowling average	68.00
5 wickets in innings	0
10 wickets in match	0
Best bowling	1/16
Catches/stumpings	15/0
- Source: ESPNcricinfo, 28 April 2015

John Willie Scaife (14 November 1908 – 27 October 1995) was an Australian cricketer who played first-class cricket for Victoria from 1927 to 1936.

At the age of 18, Scaife was one of five Victorians who made their first-class debuts against Tasmania in January 1927. Batting at number six he scored 46, adding 106 for the fifth wicket with Norman Mitchell.

One of the smallest first-class players in Australia at the time, Scaife played the full six-game Sheffield Shield season in 1927–28, scoring 207 runs at an average of 34.50 in a season when his teammates Bill Ponsford and Bill Woodfull each averaged well over 100 with the bat and Victoria won the Shield. He was one of the three emergencies named for Australia's tour of New Zealand at the end of the season, but was not required to play.

He played in a trial match for an Australian XI against The Rest at the start of the 1928–29 season but was not successful. He continued to play for Victoria with mixed success. He did not score his first century until 1933–34, when he made 120 and 80 to help Victoria draw the match after New South Wales had declared at 672 for 8 in their first innings. His best season was 1935–36, when he made 573 runs at 52.09.

He played his last first-class matches in 1936-37 for the Europeans team in the Bombay Quadrangular.

== See also ==
- List of Victoria first-class cricketers
