= Will Jefferson =

English cricketer

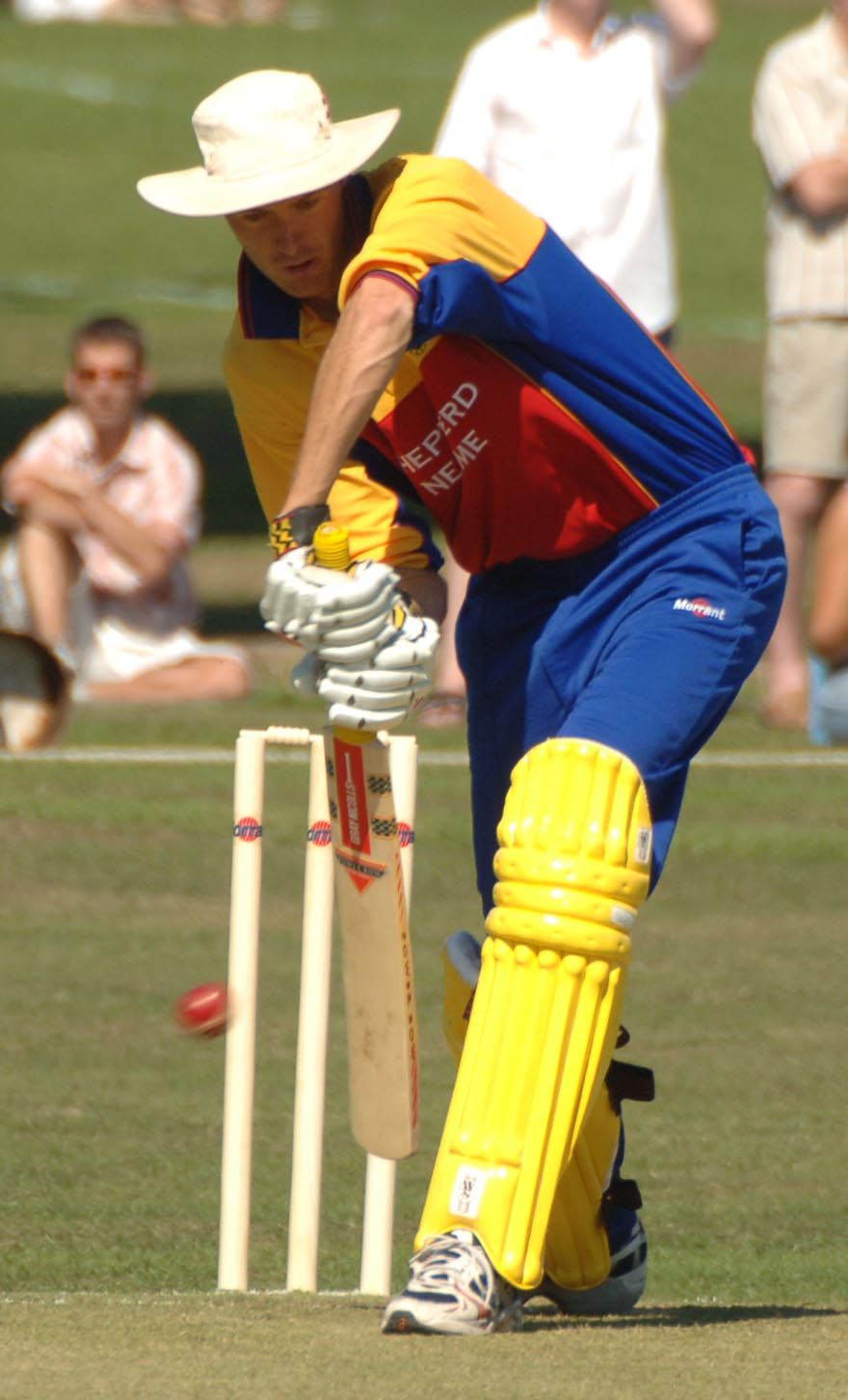

Personal information
- Full name: William Ingleby Jefferson
- Born: 25 October 1979 (age 47); Derby, England
- Height: 6 ft 10 in (2.08 m)
- Batting: Right-handed
- Bowling: Right-arm slow
- Relatives: Richard Jefferson (father); Julian Jefferson (grandfather)

Domestic team information
- Years: Team
- 2000–2006: Essex
- 2007–2009: Nottinghamshire
- 2010–2012: Leicestershire

Career statistics
Competition	FC	LA	T20
Matches	119	101	69
Runs scored	7,096	3,144	1,254
Batting average	35.83	34.17	20.90
100s/50s	17/27	4/18	0/6
Top score	222	132	83
Balls bowled	120	24	–
Wickets	1	2	–
Bowling average	60.00	4.50	–
5 wickets in innings	0	0	–
10 wickets in match	0	0	–
Best bowling	1/16	2/9	–
Catches/stumpings	127/–	43/–	25/–
- Source: CricketArchive, 1 April 2013

William Ingleby Jefferson (born 25 October 1979) is a former professional cricketer who played for Essex County Cricket Club, Nottinghamshire and Leicestershire in a 12-year career. He retired from the game in 2012 as a result of a chronic hip complaint. Standing 6 feet 10 inches (2.08 m) tall, (Note: Sources differ as to his height. Cricinfo gives 6 ft 9½ in, the ECB and many other sources give 6 ft 10 in, and Essex County Cricket Club gives 6 ft 10½ in. (Final reference retrieved 16 April 2006, no longer present as of 29 August 2006).) he was the tallest player in county cricket during most of his career, and among the tallest professional cricketers ever. (Note: Paul Dunkels who represented Sussex and Warwickshire is also reputed to be 6-foot 10 inches tall (Cricinfo Profile). The height of Anthony Allom of Surrey is recorded as between 6-foot 9 inches and 6-foot 10 inches (Cricinfo Profile))

Jefferson was a right-handed opening batsman and a reliable slip fielder. He was born in Derby to a cricketing family; his father Richard Jefferson played first-class cricket for Surrey, while his grandfather Julian Jefferson played first-class cricket in the 1920s for services teams. He showed his promise at Oundle School and Durham University. Jefferson studied at Durham from 1999 to 2002, completing the Sport in the Community course. He made his first-class debut for British Universities against the touring Zimbabweans in 2000.

His first full season at Essex was 2002, during which he scored 815 first-class runs; his 165 not out in the final match of the season made a major contribution to Essex winning the second division of the County Championship.

His best season was 2004, in which he scored 1555 first-class runs at an average of 55.53 with 6 centuries including a high score of 222. In 2005, a slump in form saw him relegated to the Essex Second XI, but he responded with 303 not out against Marylebone Cricket Club (MCC) Young Cricketers, and regained his place in the first team.

Before the start of the 2006 season, he suffered a freak accident, cutting his left wrist whilst trying to open a window, and severing the tendons. After recovering from this injury, he failed to regain a regular place in the Essex side, and left the county by mutual consent in August 2006. In September of that year, he signed a three-year contract with Nottinghamshire.

In January 2007, he was selected for the England A team to tour Bangladesh in February and March.

Jefferson had his contract terminated by Nottinghamshire in September 2009 after a run of poor form stretching back two years. However, he marked a return to form by scoring 112 in the first match of the 2011 county season, and his finest moment for Leicestershire was probably to secure their place in the T20 Final that year by smashing three boundaries in the "super over" needed, after their semi-final against Lancashire ended in a tie.
