= Edward Benson =

Edward Benson may refer to:

- Edward White Benson (1829–1896), Archbishop of Canterbury
- E. F. Benson (1867–1940), English writer, son of the above
- Edward Benson (cricketer) (1907–1967), English cricketer
