= International cricket in 1955–56 =

International cricket season

The 1955–56 international cricket season was from September 1955 to April 1956.

== Season overview ==
International tours
Start date	Home team	Away team	Results [Matches]			
Start date	Home team	Away team	Test	ODI	FC	LA
13 October 1955	Pakistan	New Zealand	2–0 [3]	—	—	—
21 October 1955	India	Ceylon	—	—	0–1 [1]	—
19 November 1955	India	New Zealand	2–0 [5]	—	—	—
20 January 1956	Pakistan	Marylebone	—	—	2–1 [4]	—
3 February 1955	New Zealand	West Indies	3–1 [4]	—	—	—

== October ==
=== New Zealand in Pakistan ===
Test series
No.	Date	Home captain	Away captain	Venue	Result
Test 413	13–17 October	Abdul Kardar	Harry Cave	National Stadium, Karachi	Pakistan by an innings and 1 runs
Test 414	26–31 October	Abdul Kardar	Harry Cave	Bagh-e-Jinnah Stadium, Lahore	West Indies by 4 wickets
Test 415	7–12 November	Abdul Kardar	Harry Cave	Bangabandhu National Stadium, Dhaka	Match drawn

=== Ceylon in India ===
MJ Gopalan Trophy
No.	Date	Home captain	Away captain	Venue	Result
FC Match	21–23 October	Coimbatarao Gopinath	Vernon Prins	Corporation Stadium, Madras	Ceylon by an innings and 14 runs
3-day Match
No.	Date	Home captain	Away captain	Venue	Result
FC Match	29–31 October	Edulji Aibara	Vernon Prins	Fateh Maidan, Hyderabad	Match drawn

== November ==
=== New Zealand in India ===
Test series
No.	Date	Home captain	Away captain	Venue	Result
Test 416	19–24 November	Ghulam Ahmed	Harry Cave	Fateh Maidan, Hyderabad	Match drawn
Test 417	2–7 December	Polly Umrigar	Harry Cave	Brabourne Stadium, Bombay	India by an innings and 27 runs
Test 418	16–21 December	Polly Umrigar	Harry Cave	Feroz Shah Kotla Ground, Delhi	Match drawn
Test 419	28 Dec–2 January	Polly Umrigar	Harry Cave	Eden Gardens, Calcutta	Match drawn
Test 420	6–11 January	Polly Umrigar	Harry Cave	Corporation Stadium, Madras	India by an innings and 109 runs

== January ==
=== MCC in Pakistan ===
First-class series
No.	Date	Home captain	Away captain	Venue	Result
FC 1	20–25 January	Abdul Kardar	Donald Carr	Bagh-e-Jinnah, Lahore	Match drawn
FC 2	3–8 February	Abdul Kardar	Donald Carr	Bangabandhu National Stadium, Dhaka	Pakistan by an innings and 10 runs
FC 3	24–29 February	Abdul Kardar	Donald Carr	Peshawar Club Ground, Peshawar	Pakistan by 7 wickets
FC 4	9–14 March	Abdul Kardar	Donald Carr	National Stadium, Karachi	Marylebone by 2 wickets

== February ==
=== West Indies in New Zealand ===
Test series
No.	Date	Home captain	Away captain	Venue	Result
Test 421	3–6 February	Harry Cave	Denis Atkinson	Carisbrook, Dunedin	West Indies by an innings and 71 runs
Test 422	18–21 February	John Reid	Denis Atkinson	AMI Stadium, Christchurch	West Indies by an innings and 64 runs
Test 423	3–7 March	John Reid	Denis Atkinson	Basin Reserve, Wellington	West Indies by 9 wickets
Test 424	9–13 March	John Reid	Denis Atkinson	Eden Park, Auckland	New Zealand by 190 runs
