= Alf Gover =

English cricketer

Personal information
- Full name: Alfred Richard Gover
- Born: 29 February 1908; Epsom, Surrey, England
- Died: 7 October 2001 (aged 93); London, England
- Batting: Right-handed
- Bowling: Right-arm fast

International information
- National side: England
- Test debut: 25 July 1936 v India
- Last Test: 17 August 1946 v India

Career statistics
Competition	Test	First-class
Matches	4	362
Runs scored	2	2,312
Batting average	–	9.36
100s/50s	0/0	0/0
Top score	2*	41*
Balls bowled	816	74,503
Wickets	8	1,555
Bowling average	44.87	23.63
5 wickets in innings	0	95
10 wickets in match	0	17
Best bowling	3/85	8/34
Catches/stumpings	1/–	171/–
- Source: ESPNcricinfo, 7 November 2022

Alfred Richard Gover MBE (29 February 1908 – 7 October 2001) was an English Test cricketer. He was the mainstay of the Surrey bowling attack during the 1930s and played four Tests before and after the Second World War. He also founded and ran a cricket school in Wandsworth that coached many notable players.

"Good cricket was a crusade for one of the game's kindest men" wrote the cricket correspondent, Colin Bateman, about Gover's long-standing coaching exploits.

== Playing career ==
Alf Gover was born in Epsom, Surrey in 1908. A fast right-hand bowler with a deadly outswinger and a cleverly disguised breakback, Gover began bowling at a young age and was first taken on trial by Essex in July 1926. He bowled Johnny Douglas at the nets several times and travelled with Essex as twelfth man to The Oval in 1927. A chance conversation with Bert Strudwick, the great Surrey wicket-keeper, led Gover to changing county because he thought his prospects would be brighter with Surrey.

Gover played his first county match against Sussex in June 1928, but did not establish himself permanently until 1930. With Freddie Brown, Percy Fender and Maurice Allom available up to 1932, Gover did not play a major role, but with Brown and Allom moving into business Gover was called upon to bear a much heavier burden in the dry summer of 1933 and responded with 98 County Championship wickets. His advance was the result of curbing a tendency to overstep the crease, but his cumbersome action was still criticised even as his strong build of 188 cm (6 ft 2 in) and 87 kg (13 st 10 lb), combined with vast capacity for work on the placid Oval wickets had him in contention for a Test place against such candidates as Bowes, Farnes, "Nobby" Clark and Copson.

In 1935 Gover's progress was stalled by him shortening his run to conserve his energy, but when allowed his full run in 1936 Gover went from strength to strength. He took 54 wickets in May mostly on the placid Oval pitches, and carried on so well that he took 171 County Championship wickets for 15.42 each even when many pitches were too wet for him. He played for England against India at Old Trafford but the wicket was so good that even his energetic delivery could produce no venom. The following year (1937) Gover did equally well, again taking 201 wickets. He remains the only fast bowler to take that many wickets in a season, since Tom Richardson in 1897.

Injury on a winter tour of India ended Gover's run of success: in 1938, apart from a week in late May and early June when he achieved his best figures of 14 for 85 against Worcestershire, Gover was clearly unfit (despite periods of rest) and had so little venom his haul of wickets fell from 201 to just 86. Though he recovered somewhat in 1939 with increased fitness, it was already evident Gover would struggle to regain the speed and venom of his two great years. However, when county cricket resumed after World War II in 1946 Gover, at 38, bowled so well under unfavourable conditions that he played in the Third Test against India. With his strong physique it was surprising he was not chosen for either the 1936/1937 or 1946/1947 Ashes tours. He decided 1947 would be his last year in county cricket, but Gover was still regarded as the best fast bowler in England, and there were calls for him to be selected for the last Test when Harold Butler withdrew and Alec Bedser was out of form.

== Coaching career ==
After Gover retired from first-class cricket, he played a couple of matches in 1948 for Bedfordshire in the Minor Counties competition, taking 25 wickets at just over nine runs each. But after that he devoted his life to his cricket school in Wandsworth. He established this school in 1938 and had already trained a number of future Test players by the time of his last match for Surrey. However, in the following decades Gover gradually developed his school to such an extent that it became regarded as the most valuable school for the fine-tuning of cricketers' skills. His school, redeveloped from its humble origins as an industrial shed, was where many Test or potential Test players developed the necessary skill to rise to the highest levels in cricket. Frank Tyson, Viv Richards, Andy Roberts and Ian Bishop are some notable examples of players who benefitted from Gover's coaching. While covering the 1954–55 Ashes tour as a journalist he advised Tyson to shorten his run-up, which proved to be a turning point in the series. It was primarily for his work in cricket coaching, rather than his deeds for Surrey in the 1930s and 1940s, that Gover was awarded an MBE in 1998.

Gover continued to be principal at his school until 1989, and he wrote widely on cricket right up to his death, in London, at the age of 93 in 2001. At the time of his death Gover was the oldest surviving Test cricketer, and his death left Bob Appleyard as the only living bowler who had ever taken 200 wickets in an English season.

He was President of the Lord's Taverners in 1974 and President of Surrey for 1980. He was cremated at Putney Vale Crematorium.

Preceded by Lionel Birkett	Oldest Living Test Cricketer; 16 January 1998 – 7 October 2001	Succeeded by Lindsay Weir
