= Dennis Smith (New Zealand cricketer) =

New Zealand cricketer (1913–1986)

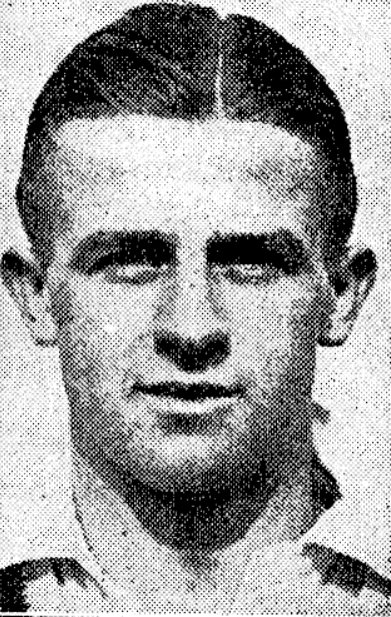
- Smith in 1933

Personal information
- Full name: Horace Dennis Smith
- Born: 8 January 1913; Toowoomba, Queensland, Australia
- Died: 25 January 1986 (aged 73); Christchurch, New Zealand
- Batting: Right-handed
- Bowling: Right-arm fast-medium

International information
- National side: New Zealand (1933)
- Only Test (cap 24): 24 March 1933 v England

Domestic team information
- Years: Team
- 1931/32–1932/33: Otago
- 1933/34: Canterbury

Career statistics
Competition	Test	First-class
Matches	1	11
Runs scored	4	404
Batting average	4.00	22.44
100s/50s	0/0	0/1
Top score	4	52
Balls bowled	120	1,065
Wickets	1	17
Bowling average	113.00	33.52
5 wickets in innings	0	0
10 wickets in match	0	0
Best bowling	1/113	3/41
Catches/stumpings	0/–	6/–
- Source: Cricinfo, 1 April 2017

Horace Dennis Smith (8 January 1913 – 25 January 1986) was a New Zealand cricketer who played in one Test match in 1933.

== Life and career ==
Dennis Smith was born in Toowoomba in Queensland, where he lived until he was 12, when he enrolled at Geelong Grammar School. He studied there from 1925 to 1929, excelling in sport. He won the award for the best all-rounder in the Melbourne public schools cricket competition in 1929. He moved to Dunedin in 1930.

In club cricket in Dunedin, Smith played as a batsman who bowled occasionally, but for Otago he played as an all-rounder who bowled fast-medium and batted in the middle order. He made his debut for Otago in 1931–32 at the age of 18. In the three matches in the Plunket Shield in 1932–33 he scored 147 runs at 36.75, with a top score of 52, and took seven wickets at 14.00, helping Otago to win the Plunket Shield.

A few weeks after the Plunket Shield season finished, Smith opened the New Zealand attack in the First Test against England with his Otago colleague Ted Badcock. He took his only Test wicket with his first delivery when he bowled Eddie Paynter; he was the tenth player to achieve the feat. He sent down another 119 deliveries without success. He was replaced by another Otago colleague, Jack Dunning, for the Second Test, when he served as twelfth man.

He moved to Christchurch in September 1933 to work for the importing and exporting firm A. M. Satterthwaite and Co. He played for Canterbury in the 1933–34 season but was less effective than he had been for Otago, and he played his last first-class match not long after he turned 21. However, he was one of the leading batsmen in Christchurch senior club cricket in 1933–34, scoring 507 runs at an average of 84.50 with three centuries, helping his team West Christchurch to the championship.

Smith became general manager of A. M. Satterthwaite and Co, and was appointed managing director in 1954.

== See also ==
- One-Test wonder
