= Lindsay Weir =

Lindsay Weir may refer to:

- Lindsay Weir (Freaks and Geeks), fictional character Lindsay Weir
- Lindsay Weir (cricketer) (1908–2003), New Zealand cricketer
