= Henry Foley (New Zealand cricketer) =

New Zealand cricketer

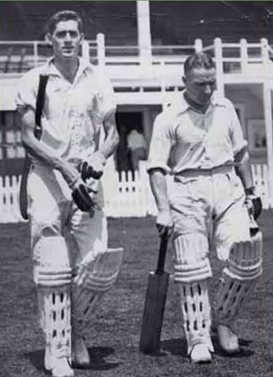
- Henry Foley (left) and Stewart Dempster, 1930

Personal information
- Born: 28 January 1906; Wellington, New Zealand
- Died: 16 October 1948 (aged 42); Brisbane, Queensland, Australia
- Batting: Left-handed

International information
- National side: New Zealand (1930)
- Only Test (cap 5): 10 January 1930 v England

Career statistics
Competition	Test	First-class
Matches	1	15
Runs scored	4	670
Batting average	2.00	33.50
100s/50s	0/0	1/2
Top score	2	136
Balls bowled	–	246
Wickets	–	4
Bowling average	–	34.50
5 wickets in innings	–	0
10 wickets in match	–	0
Best bowling	–	2/16
Catches/stumpings	0/–	13/–
- Source: Cricinfo, 11 April 2017

Henry Foley (28 January 1906 – 16 October 1948) was a New Zealand Test cricketer who played first-class cricket for Wellington from 1927 to 1933. He played in New Zealand's first Test match.

== Personal life ==
Foley went to school at Wellington College and then attended Victoria College, where he gained Bachelor of Arts and Bachelor of Commerce degrees.

== Domestic career ==
Foley made his first-class debut at the start of the 1927–28 season playing for The Rest against the New Zealand side that had just returned from its tour of England. In his only innings in a rain-ruined match he made 66 not out batting at number seven, then took the wicket of Stewie Dempster. In a similar match a week later he made 3 and 35 not out, batting at number eight. Making his Plunket Shield debut for Wellington a few weeks later, he opened the innings and made 28 not out to steer his side to a five-wicket victory over Canterbury. In the next match, against Otago, he made his only first-class century, 136 not out, batting at number three, in an innings victory for Wellington. In his first four matches he had made 286 runs at an average of 143.00.

== International career ==
Foley was selected in both matches when a strong Australian side captained by Vic Richardson played two matches against New Zealand later that season, scoring 50 not out at number six in the first match and 24 and 42 at number three in the second. He finished his initial first-class season in the national team and with a batting average of 52.66.

He was not able to reproduce that good form in subsequent years, and his career was curtailed by ill-health. In three matches in 1928-29 he made 117 runs at 29.25.

Foley was selected to open the innings when New Zealand played its first-ever Test match, against England at Christchurch in January 1930, but he scored only 2 and 2 in a New Zealand defeat. For the Second Test he was replaced as opener by Jackie Mills (who scored a century on debut) and played no further Tests.

Foley played only three more first-class matches. In his last match he made 39 for Wellington against Douglas Jardine's MCC team in 1932–33.

His Wisden obituary said Foley "developed into an exceedingly good left-hand opening batsman with limitless patience and there were few better slip fieldsmen".

== After cricket ==
Foley worked as an accountant for the Commercial Bank of Australia. In June 1946 he was transferred from the Dunedin branch to the office in Queen Street, Brisbane. At the time of his death two years later at the age of 42, he and his wife and their son were living in Newmarket in Brisbane.
