= Richard Jefferson (cricketer) =

English cricketer

Personal information
- Full name: Richard Ingleby Jefferson
- Born: 15 August 1941 (age 85); Frimley Green, Surrey, England
- Batting: Right-handed
- Bowling: Right-arm medium-fast
- Relatives: Julian Jefferson (father); Will Jefferson (son)

Domestic team information
- Years: Team
- 1961: Cambridge University
- 1961–1966: Surrey
- 1963: Marylebone Cricket Club
- 1968–1971: Norfolk
- 1969: Minor Counties
- 1972: Minor Counties North

Career statistics
Competition	First-class	List A
Matches	94	12
Runs scored	2,094	112
Batting average	19.75	10.18
100s/50s	2/6	–/1
Top score	136	55
Balls bowled	17,326	798
Wickets	263	13
Bowling average	27.56	33.15
5 wickets in innings	10	–
10 wickets in match	1	–
Best bowling	6/25	3/44
Catches/stumpings	32/–	3/–
- Source: Cricinfo, 15 March 2019

Richard Ingleby Jefferson (born 15 August 1941 in Frimley Green, Surrey) is a former amateur cricketer who played for Surrey County Cricket Club. He was one of the last first-class cricketers to play as an amateur.

The son of Brigadier Julian Jefferson, Jefferson was educated at Ludgrove School, Winchester College and Corpus Christi College, Cambridge. He won a blue but left after a year on failing his exams. He went on to play a couple of seasons for Surrey before illness in 1965 curtailed his first-class career. He subsequently played for Norfolk, before taking a Certificate in Education and teaching in a private school.

A right-arm medium-fast bowler and right-handed bat, he was mentioned in a 1981 article by John Arlott on the best English cricketers never to have played for England. Arlott wrote that "he may well have been the greatest loss to English cricket in the post-war period".

He is the father of the cricketer Will Jefferson.
