= Eddie McLeod (cricketer) =

New Zealand cricketer

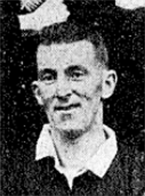
- Eddie McLeod in 1935

Personal information
- Full name: Edwin George McLeod
- Born: 14 October 1900; Auckland, New Zealand
- Died: 14 September 1989 (aged 88); Auckland, New Zealand
- Batting: Left-handed
- Bowling: Right-arm leg-spin

International information
- National side: New Zealand (1930)
- Only Test (cap 12): 24 January 1930 v England

Career statistics
Competition	Test	First-class
Matches	1	28
Runs scored	18	1407
Batting average	18.00	32.72
100s/50s	0/0	1/9
Top score	16	102
Balls bowled	12	1018
Wickets	0	20
Bowling average	–	33.20
5 wickets in innings	–	0
10 wickets in match	–	0
Best bowling	–	4/56
Catches/stumpings	0/–	11/–
- Source: Cricinfo, 1 April 2017

Edwin George McLeod (14 October 1900 – 14 September 1989) was a New Zealand cricketer who played in one Test in 1930. He was also an international hockey player who captained New Zealand.

== Cricket career ==
McLeod was a middle-order and opening batsman who also bowled leg-spin. He played for Auckland from 1920–21 to 1923–24, and for Wellington from 1925–26 to 1940–41. He captained Wellington in 1939-40 and 1940–41.

When the MCC toured New Zealand to play New Zealand's first Test series in 1929–30, McLeod scored 37 and 21 not out and took 3 for 7 and 4 for 56 for Wellington against the tourists. New Zealand lost the First Test shortly afterwards, and McLeod was one of three new players brought in for the Second Test. He was not successful (although New Zealand improved and drew the match) and did not play any further Tests. He made 102 and 35 for Wellington against Auckland two weeks after the Test series ended.

== Hockey career ==
McLeod represented New Zealand in hockey in the 1920s and 1930s. He played in New Zealand's first hockey Test match, against Australia in 1922 at Palmerston North, a game that New Zealand won 5–4. He was the captain of the New Zealand side that played India in a three-Test series in New Zealand in 1935. He later served as a national hockey selector.

== See also ==
- List of Auckland representative cricketers
