= Colin Alexander (cricketer) =

Australian cricketer (1907–1993)

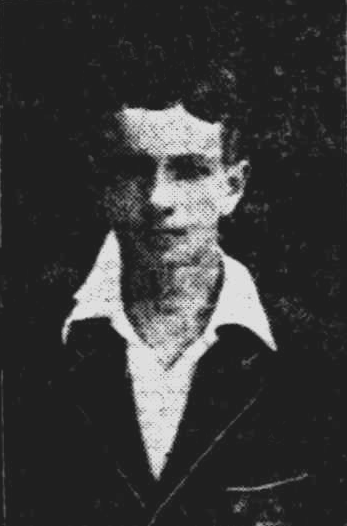

Personal information
- Full name: William Colin Alexander
- Born: 14 September 1907; Gawler, South Australia
- Died: 8 February 1993 (aged 85); Melbourne, Victoria, Australia
- Batting: Right-handed
- Bowling: Right-arm off-spin

Domestic team information
- Years: Team
- 1925/26–1928/29: South Australia

Career statistics
Competition	First-class
Matches	26
Runs scored	1,414
Batting average	34.48
100s/50s	3/9
Top score	133
Balls bowled	176
Wickets	3
Bowling average	40.00
5 wickets in innings	0
10 wickets in match	0
Best bowling	1/10
Catches/stumpings	11/–
- Source: Cricket Archive, 2 May 2015

William Colin Alexander (14 September 1907 – 8 February 1993) was an Australian cricketer who played first-class cricket from 1925 to 1929.

A middle-order batsman, Alexander made his first-class debut for South Australia in the 1925–26 season a few weeks after turning 18. In his second match, against the touring New Zealanders, he scored 130 and 34 not out. In his next match, which was his first in the Sheffield Shield, he scored 133 against Victoria. In the 1926–27 season he scored 55 and 104 against New South Wales, and he was selected to play for The Rest of Australia against an Australian XI at the end of the season.

Alexander scored 328 runs at an average of 32.80 in 1927–28, and was selected in a 13-man squad to tour New Zealand at the end of the season. He played in four of the six first-class matches on the tour, including one of the two against New Zealand, but apart from an innings of 95 against Auckland he was unsuccessful. After a few matches in 1928–29 he played no more first-class cricket. He was only 21 when he played his last match.
