= Doug Freeman =

New Zealand cricketer

- Freeman in December 1933

Personal information
- Full name: Douglas Linford Freeman
- Born: 8 September 1914; Randwick, Sydney, New South Wales, Australia
- Died: 31 May 1994 (aged 79); Sydney, Australia
- Batting: Right-handed
- Bowling: Legbreak googly

International information
- National side: New Zealand (1933)
- Test debut (cap 23): 24 March 1933 v England
- Last Test: 31 March 1933 v England

Career statistics
Competition	Test	First-class
Matches	2	5
Runs scored	2	28
Batting average	1.00	4.66
100s/50s	0/0	0/0
Top score	1	8
Balls bowled	240	678
Wickets	1	14
Bowling average	169.00	35.35
5 wickets in innings	0	1
10 wickets in match	0	0
Best bowling	1/91	5/102
Catches/stumpings	0/–	3/–
- Source: Cricinfo, 1 April 2017

Douglas Linford Freeman (8 September 1914 – 31 May 1994) was a New Zealand cricketer who played in two Tests in 1933. He was born in Australia in the Sydney suburb of Randwick, and also died in Sydney.

== Cricket career ==
Freeman attended Nelson College from 1931 to 1933. In a match for the College team in the Nelson club competition in 1931-32 he took 18 wickets: 8 for 64 and 10 for 132.

A leg-spinner, Freeman made his first-class debut in January 1933, only two months before his Test debut, taking 4 for 85 and 5 for 102 for Wellington against Auckland. In his second first-class match, for Wellington against the MCC, he took 3 for 71, his victims Eddie Paynter, Wally Hammond and Les Ames. He also played his first two Hawke Cup matches for Nelson in January and February 1933, taking 13 wickets for 133.

Freeman was selected to play Test cricket while still a school student, making his debut in March 1933 at the age of 18 years and 197 days. He was New Zealand's youngest Test cricketer until Daniel Vettori made his debut in 1997. Freeman took only one wicket (of Herbert Sutcliffe) in the two Tests of the series, in which Hammond made 227 and 336 not out. He played one match for Wellington in the 1933–34 season, taking one wicket, and that was the end of his first-class career, at the age of 19.

== Later life ==
Freeman moved to Fiji in 1935, where he worked for the Colonial Sugar Refining company. He managed the Fiji cricket team's tour of New Zealand in 1953-54 and played in some of the minor matches, but achieved little with bat or ball. He later worked for CSR in Australia.
