= Tolly Burnett =

English cricketer (1923–1993)

Personal information
- Full name: Anthony Compton Burnett
- Born: 26 October 1923; Chipstead, Surrey, England
- Died: 31 May 1993 (aged 69); Wexham, Berkshire, England
- Nickname: Tolly
- Batting: Right-handed
- Role: Occasional wicket-keeper

Domestic team information
- Years: Team
- 1958: Glamorgan
- 1951: Marylebone Cricket Club
- 1949–1950: Cambridge University

Career statistics
| Competition | First-class |
|---|---|
| Matches | 27 |
| Runs scored | 790 |
| Batting average | 23.23 |
| 100s/50s | 0/5 |
| Top score | 79* |
| Balls bowled | 24 |
| Wickets | 0 |
| Bowling average | – |
| 5 wickets in innings | – |
| 10 wickets in match | – |
| Best bowling | – |
| Catches/stumpings | 20/– |
- Source: Cricinfo, 28 October 2012

Anthony "Tolly" Compton Burnett (26 October 1923 – 31 May 1993) was an English cricketer. Burnett was a right-handed batsman who occasionally fielded as a wicket-keeper. He was born at Chipstead, Surrey, and was educated at Lancing College.

Burnett served in the Second World War before going to Pembroke College, Cambridge. He had a successful season as a batsman with the university team in 1949 and a few matches again in 1950 before becoming a science master at Eton College. After that he played only club cricket until his mid-30s, when Glamorgan, who were looking for somebody to take over the captaincy when Wilf Wooller retired, decided to give him a trial in the 1958 season. After eight matches in which he scored only 71 runs in 11 innings, Burnett returned to Eton. His highest first-class score was 79 not out for Cambridge University against Middlesex in 1949.

Burnett later changed his name to Anthony Compton-Burnett. His son, Richard Compton-Burnett, played one first-class match for Cambridge University in 1981.
