= Thomas Cobcroft =

Australian cricketer and umpire (1867–1938)

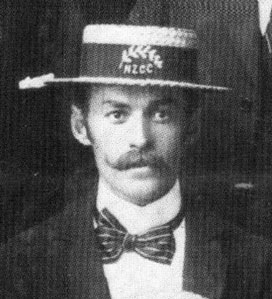
- Tom Cobcroft, 1898–99

Personal information
- Full name: Leslie Thomas Cobcroft
- Born: 12 February 1867; Muswellbrook, New South Wales, Australia
- Died: 9 March 1938 (aged 71); Wellington, New Zealand
- Nickname: Cobby
- Batting: Right-handed
- Bowling: Right-arm off-spin

Domestic team information
- Years: Team
- 1895/96: New South Wales
- 1897/98–1899/00: Canterbury
- 1906/07–1909/10: Wellington

Career statistics
Competition	First-class
Matches	23
Runs scored	868
Batting average	21.70
100s/50s	0/5
Top score	85*
Balls bowled	1,178
Wickets	37
Bowling average	18.97
5 wickets in innings	2
10 wickets in match	0
Best bowling	6/23
Catches/stumpings	18/–
- Source: CricketArchive, 8 October 2014

Leslie Thomas Cobcroft (12 February 1867 – 9 March 1938) was a first-class cricketer in Australia and New Zealand who went on to umpire Test cricket.

Cobcroft was born in Muswellbrook in New South Wales. He became a solicitor.

A right-hand batsman and off-break bowler, he played 23 matches of first-class cricket from 1895–96 to 1909–10. He captained the New South Wales side that toured New Zealand in 1895–96. He settled in New Zealand, and played for Canterbury from 1897–98 to 1899–1900 and for Wellington from 1906–07 to 1909–10. He was the third captain for New Zealand in first-class cricket, captaining the side that toured Australia in 1898–99. He also captained Canterbury, Wellington and Wairarapa sides.

In first-class games, he scored a total of 868 runs in 42 innings, at the relatively low batting average of 21.70, including 5 half-centuries. He made his highest score, 85 not out, carrying his bat for New South Wales against Wellington in December 1895. He took 37 wickets at the excellent bowling average of 18.97, with best bowling of 6/23 for Canterbury against Wellington in December 1899 (he also hit 70 and 44 with the bat in that match). His only other 5-wicket haul came for Wellington against Otago in December 1907: he took 4/20 and 5/87 in that match.

He umpired 14 first-class matches from March 1925 to February 1935, all in New Zealand. He umpired three Test matches: the 2nd, 3rd and 4th Tests between New Zealand and England, played consecutively in New Zealand in January and February 1930. He stood with Ken Cave in all three matches, which were all drawn. The 2nd Test was played at Basin Reserve in Wellington. The first two days of the 3rd Test at Eden Park in Auckland were washed out, so the 4th Test was arranged a week later.

He contributed a cricket column in the weekly New Zealand Truth during the cricket seasons from September 1922 to March 1927, beginning with a series on the reasons why the standard of New Zealand cricket was inferior to Australia's.

He was also a cricket coach. For the last 15 years of his life he worked as a clerk in the railways, and died at his home in Petone. He and his wife Ethel had two daughters and a son.
