= Sidney White =

English cricketer

Sidney Grayling White (11 August 1892 – 1 May 1949) was an English first-class cricketer active 1921–33 who played for Middlesex. He was born in Sunbury-on-Thames; died in Chipstead, Surrey.
