= Ted Badcock =

New Zealand cricketer (1897–1982)

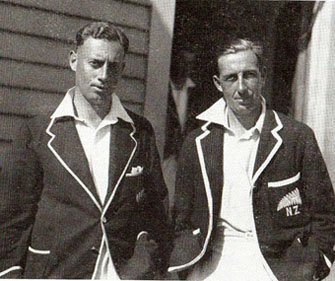
- Ted Badcock (right) with Roger Blunt

Personal information
- Full name: Frederick Theodore Badcock
- Born: 9 August 1897; Abbottabad, British India
- Died: 19 September 1982 (aged 85); South Perth, Western Australia
- Batting: Right-handed
- Bowling: Right-arm fast-medium
- Role: Allrounder

International information
- National side: New Zealand
- Test debut (cap 1): 10 January 1930 v England
- Last Test: 31 March 1933 v England

Domestic team information
- Years: Team
- 1924/25–1929/30: Wellington
- 1930/31–1936/37: Otago

Career statistics
Competition	Test	First-class
Matches	7	53
Runs scored	137	2383
Batting average	19.57	25.62
100s/50s	0/2	4/13
Top score	64	155
Balls bowled	1,608	15995
Wickets	16	221
Bowling average	38.12	23.57
5 wickets in innings	0	14
10 wickets in match	0	5
Best bowling	4/80	7/50
Catches/stumpings	1/–	38/–
- Source: Cricinfo, 11 April 2017

Frederick Theodore Badcock (9 August 1897 – 19 September 1982) was a New Zealand first-class and Test cricketer. Perhaps the best all-rounder in New Zealand in the interwar period, he played seven Test matches for New Zealand between 1930 and 1933, including New Zealand's inaugural Test in 1930. He was the first players capped by New Zealand.

== Early life ==
Badcock was born at Abbottabad in the North-West Frontier Province of British India and educated at Wellington College in Berkshire, England. He served in the British Army in India and played for the Surrey Second XI in the Minor Counties Championship in 1923, before emigrating to New Zealand in 1924, where he became a first-class cricketer and cricket coach.

== Early cricket career ==
Badcock played first-class cricket for Wellington between 1924–25 and 1929–30, and then for Otago until 1936–37, with a final first-class game in England in 1945.

A fine batsman and bowler, and also an excellent fielder, he was perhaps the best all-rounder in New Zealand in the inter-war period. On occasion, he also opened the batting. He achieved great success with the ball in his first three seasons of domestic cricket. In 1925–26, he took 37 wickets in four matches at a bowling average of 17.05; in 1926–27, he took 23 wickets in three matches, averaging 11.69; and in 1927–28, he took 17 wickets in three matches at 17.94. His batting also started promisingly, hitting 65 in his first game, and 57 in the second, but then did not pass 50 runs until he hit his maiden first-class century against Canterbury in 1927.

He was selected in the New Zealand team to tour England in 1927, but withdrew after controversy about his eligibility to play for the national team. Ernest Bernau took his place despite playing no first-class cricket that summer. Badcock took 4/82 and 4/23 for Wellington against the Australian tourists in 1927–28, and was then selected to play for New Zealand in two representative matches against the tourists. He took only 1/121 in the first match, and 0/14 and 2/33 in the second. His batting was also unspectacular: he was twice bowled by Clarrie Grimmett without scoring, and was dismissed for two runs in his other completed innings.

== Test cricket ==
Badcock played in seven Test matches, all in New Zealand. He reached two Test fifties, both against South Africa in 1932, but his Test batting average was only 19.57. He had more success with the ball, taking 16 Test wickets with a bowling average of 38.12. His best bowling, 4/80, came against England in 1930.

He was a member of the team that played New Zealand's first Test match, played at Lancaster Park, Christchurch, in January 1930, against a touring English team. He made an inauspicious debut with the bat: he was bowled for a king pair, dismissed first ball in both innings, by Maurice Allom in the first innings and by Stan Nichols in the second innings. The first dismissal came in after English bowler Allom had dismissed two New Zealand batsmen with his previous two deliveries; after Tom Lowry and Ken James, Badcock's wicket completed Allom's only Test hat-trick. Lowry had only faced two balls, Allom having bowled Stewie Dempster immediately beforehand, to take four wickets in five balls. Badcock fared slightly better with the ball. He opened the bowling in England's first innings, taking 2/29.

In the Second Test at Basin Reserve, Wellington later in January 1930, Badcock came in to bat at number 11 in New Zealand's first innings. He scored 4 not out, but did not bat in the second innings as New Zealand declared. As New Zealand's second opening bowler, he took 4/80 and 1/22 as the match was drawn. He played in the Third Test at Eden Park, Auckland but was refused permission by the Otago Cricket Association to take part in the fourth Test which had been scheduled after most of the third match had been washed out.

Badcock also played in the two Tests against the touring South Africa team in 1931–32. In the First Test Badcock was New Zealand's top scorer, reaching 64 in a total of 293 all out. He took 2/88 but was stumped for five in New Zealand's second innings. In the Second Test Badcock scored 53, his first Test half-century and took a single wicket.

Badcock played his final two Tests against England in 1932–33. In the First Test at Lancaster Park, Christchurch in March 1933 he opened the bowling and took 3/142, taking the wicket of Herbert Sutcliffe with the first ball of the match. In the Second Test, played at Eden Park, Auckland at the end of March, Badcock was bowled by Bill Bowes for 1, opened the bowling and took 2/126 in an innings in which Wally Hammond scored a then world record 336 not out.

R. T. Brittenden described him as having "the urbanity of Herbert Sutcliffe and the ... grace of Keith Miller" and having "tremendous presence; he commanded attention in everything he did."

== Later cricket career ==
Badcock played as a professional in the Central Lancashire League for Werneth between 1934 and 1938, and for Castleton Moor between 1939 and 1941. He made occasional appearances in the Lancashire League, for Nelson in 1934 and 1935, and also for Church in 1935. He played cricket in England during the Second World War, for representative British Empire cricket teams, for Civil Defence Services, and for Northamptonshire County Cricket Club.

Immediately after the end of the Second World War, he played a series of games for New Zealand Services against a Lord's XI, Australian Imperial Forces, Wally Hammond's XI, Plum Warner's XI, and the Royal Air Force, including a final first-class match in September 1945 against HDG Leveson-Gower's XI. Aged 47, he took 6/166 against a team that included Len Hutton, Cyril Washbrook and Bill Edrich.

In all, he played 53 first-class matches. He scored four first-class centuries – two for Wellington and two for Otago – and 13 fifties, with a batting average of 25.62. His top score was 155 for Wellington in the Plunket Shield match against Canterbury in January 1927, also his maiden first-class century. He took 221 first-class wickets at an average of 23.57. He took five wickets in an innings on 14 occasions, and 10 wickets in a match five times. His best bowling of 7/50 came in his debut match against Canterbury in January 1925.

== Later life ==
Badcock was a cricket coach in Sri Lanka for two years from 1946. He settled in South Perth, Western Australia, where he coached the Western Australia cricket team for four seasons from 1951–52 until 1954–55, and was a stalwart of the South Perth Cricket Club for many years. He died in Perth in 1982. A biography titled Ted Badcock: Roving Coach and Rascal was written by Rob Franks and published in 2019.
