= Australian cricket team in New Zealand in 1927–28 =

International cricket tour

The Australia national cricket team toured New Zealand from February to April 1928 and played six first-class matches including two against the New Zealand national cricket team. This was before New Zealand began playing Test cricket.

== Team ==
- Vic Richardson (captain)
- Colin Alexander
- Don Blackie
- Clarrie Grimmett
- Archie Jackson
- Alan Kippax
- Ray McNamee
- Frank Morton
- Bert Oldfield
- Ron Oxenham
- Bill Ponsford
- Karl Schneider
- Bill Woodfull

Don Bradman, Percy Hornibrook and John Scaife were selected as emergencies, but did not take part in the tour. W. C. Bull of New South Wales was the team manager.

It was a strong team. The Cricketer said that "the majority of the cricketers may be expected to represent the Commonwealth [of Australia] in the Test matches against England a few months hence. J. M. Gregory, in fact, was the only likely man who did not make the trip."

== The tour ==
The team arrived in Wellington on the SS Marama on 14 February. They were given a civic reception at the Town Hall that afternoon by the Mayor of Wellington, George Troup. The president of the New Zealand Cricket Council, the former New Zealand captain Dan Reese, also spoke at the reception, noting that the visit marked the golden jubilee of cricket tours between the two countries.

(First-class matches are indicated below in bold.)

- Nelson, Marlborough and Westland v Australians, Trafalgar Park, Nelson, 15, 16 February 1928. Nelson, Marlborough and Westland XI 161; Australians 472 for 9. Drawn.

The Australians arrived in Nelson early on the morning of the match, which commenced at 11.55 after a welcome at the ground by the Mayor of Nelson. Grimmett, returning to New Zealand for the first time since migrating to Australia in 1914, took 7 for 64 on the first day. Kippax scored 115.

- **Wellington v Australians**, Basin Reserve, Wellington, 17, 18, 20 February 1928. Australians 365 and 65 for 6; Wellington 206 and 230. Australians won by four wickets.

Woodfull made 165, and Grimmett took seven wickets against his former team. Ted Badcock took four wickets in each innings for Wellington, and was later selected for the New Zealand team for the unofficial Tests.

- North Otago v Australians, Waitaki Boys High School Ground, Oamaru, 22, 23 February 1928. North Otago 118 and 268 for 6; Australians 448. Drawn.

Oxenham scored 169. In the North Otago second innings, when the Australians rested their main bowlers, Carl Zimmerman scored 117 not out, reaching his century in 46 minutes.

- **Otago v Australians**, Carisbrook, Dunedin, 24, 25, 27 February 1928. Australians 454 and 79 for no wicket; Otago 171. Drawn.

Rain prevented play on the final day. Ponsford (148) and Woodfull (107) opened the match with a stand of 214. Grimmett took 6 for 23. For Otago, the fast bowler George Dickinson dismissed seven of the first eight batsmen, at one stage taking six wickets for three runs in five overs, and finished with 7 for 96.

- Southland v Australians, Rugby Park, Invercargill, 28, 29 February 1928. Southland 124 and 51 for 2; Australians 507 for 9 declared. Drawn.

Ponsford and Jackson each scored 110, and opened with a partnership of 220. The Australians scored their runs off 81 overs – a little above a run a ball.

- **Canterbury v Australians**, Lancaster Park, Christchurch, 2, 3, 5 March 1928. Canterbury 305 and 201; Australians 404 and 103 for 1. Australians won by nine wickets.

Grimmett took 13 wickets. Schneider scored 138 and Oldfield 137. For Canterbury, Bill Merritt took 5 for 105 in the first innings, and the English coach Jack Newman made 98 and 31.

- Waikato v Australians, Seddon Park, Hamilton, 7, 8 March 1928. Waikato 190 and 117; Australians 144 and 5 for 2. Drawn.

The Waikato team included five guest players from the major centres; of them, Ted Badcock again took four wickets. Morton was the Australians' most successful bowler, with nine wickets; Grimmett was not playing.

- **Auckland v Australians**, Eden Park, Auckland, 9, 10, 12 March 1928. Australians 431; Auckland 171 and 220. Australians won by an innings and 40 runs.

Richardson made 107. McNamee had figures of 21–13–12–5 in the first innings, and Grimmett took 7 for 91 in the second. Auckland's top scorer in each innings was their English player James Langridge, who made 46 and 78.

- Taranaki v Australians, Pukekura Park, New Plymouth, 14, 15 March 1928. Taranaki 138 and 112; Australians 427. Australians won by an innings and 177 runs.

Kippax made 102 and Alexander 127. The English coach Benny Wilson opened the batting and scored 80 in Taranaki's first innings.

- Wanganui v Australians, Cook’s Gardens, Wanganui, 16, 17 March 1928. Wanganui 83 and 132; Australians 428. Australians won by an innings and 213 runs.

Grimmett took 8 for 30 in the first innings. Ponsford made 101.

- Poverty Bay v Australians, The Oval, Gisborne, 20, 21 March 1928. Poverty Bay 91; Australians 120 for 1. Drawn.

Only five hours of play was possible.

- **New Zealand v Australia**, Eden Park, Auckland, 24, 26, 27 March 1928. Australia 573 for 5 declared; New Zealand 288 and 53 for 1. Drawn.

Woodfull made 284, after being 250 not out at the end of the first day. The opener Jackie Mills was New Zealand's top scorer in the first innings, with 58. Rain delayed the start of the third day's play.

- **New Zealand v Australia**, Carisbrook, Dunedin, 31 March, 2, 3 April 1928. New Zealand 162 and 154; Australia 188 and 129 for 3. Australia won by seven wickets.

Grimmett took nine wickets, Blackie six. Herb McGirr took 4 for 54 in Australia's first innings. On either side, only Roger Blunt, who made exactly 50 in New Zealand's first innings, reached 50; he added 85 for the second wicket with Henry Foley, the highest partnership of the match.
