= Chipstead, Surrey =

Village in Surrey, England

Coordinates: 51.315°N 0.163°W

Chipstead
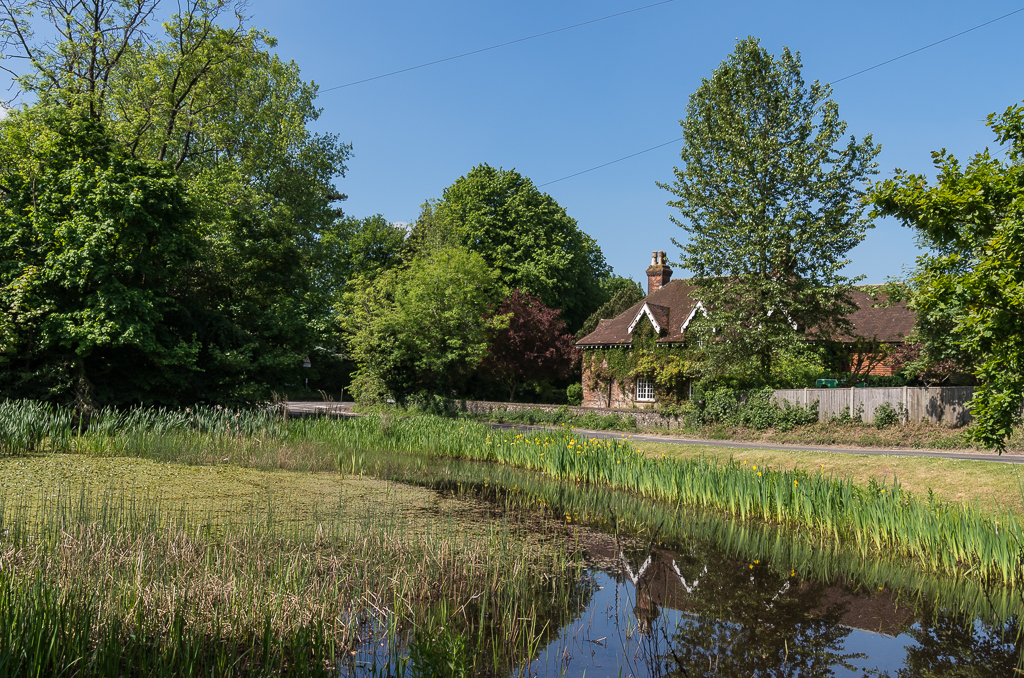
- Elmore Pond at Chipstead

- Location within Surrey
- Area: 9.6 km^{2} (3.7 sq mi)
- Population: 3,136 (2011 census)
  - Density: 327/km^{2} (850/sq mi)
- OS grid reference: TQ278569
- District: Reigate and Banstead
- Shire county: Surrey
- Region: South East
- Country: England
- Sovereign state: United Kingdom
- Post town: Coulsdon
- Postcode district: CR5
- Dialling code: 01737
- Police: Surrey
- Fire: Surrey
- Ambulance: South East Coast
- UK Parliament: Reigate

Chipstead is a predominantly commuter village in the Reigate and Banstead district, in north-east Surrey, England, that has been a small ecclesiastical parish since the Domesday Survey of 1086. Its rolling landscape meant that Chipstead's development was late and restricted compared to parishes of comparable distance from London. Formerly and formally including Hooley and Netherne-on-the-Hill, on census day, 1831 Chipstead had 66 homes. Today, excluding those two parts, the village has 1,212 homes spread across the slopes and crests of a northern section of the North Downs. Parts of the village are in or adjoin the Surrey Hills AONB.

== Geography ==
The land within and to all sides forms curved valleys of downland. Beyond Chipstead's boundaries are the villages of Woodmansterne and slightly more distant Coulsdon, Banstead, Hooley and Kingswood. Woodmansterne is in two parts, one of which is in Greater London (as is Coulsdon) – the nearest, the Surrey part is the western follow-on to the built-up valley street of Chipstead. Housing and parks span the east slopes of a narrow valley known as Chipstead Valley or Chipstead Bottom which is a dry valley. This has some subterranean flows common in the chalk hills of the North Downs, a long hill range south of Woking, Croydon and the Thames Estuary.

=== Conservation ===
The residents of Chipstead have prevented installation of street lighting, particularly in the southern parts of the village. Two residents associations exist, both founded in the 20th century. One caters broadly for all parts from Chipstead Valley to Hooley, while the second concentrates on architectural beauty and views from public places in areas where these may be at risk. Identified as among Chipstead's characteristics are its mature trees, hedgerows, rural wildlife and dark skies at night:

Villagers value the mature trees and hedgerows, the open fields and farmland, the narrow, winding lanes and the absence of street lighting

— Chipstead Residents Association

Chipstead Downs is a Site of Special Scientific Interest (SSSI). To the north-west of the village is Banstead Heath, a rolling plateau of open common land. This area is maintained by the Banstead Commons Conservators.

Today Chipstead does not have a clearly defined village centre; instead there are several small areas of economic activity in a largely residential area.

The village is home to many societies, some of which are linked to the church. Another focal point of the village is a small parade of shops, near to the railway station.

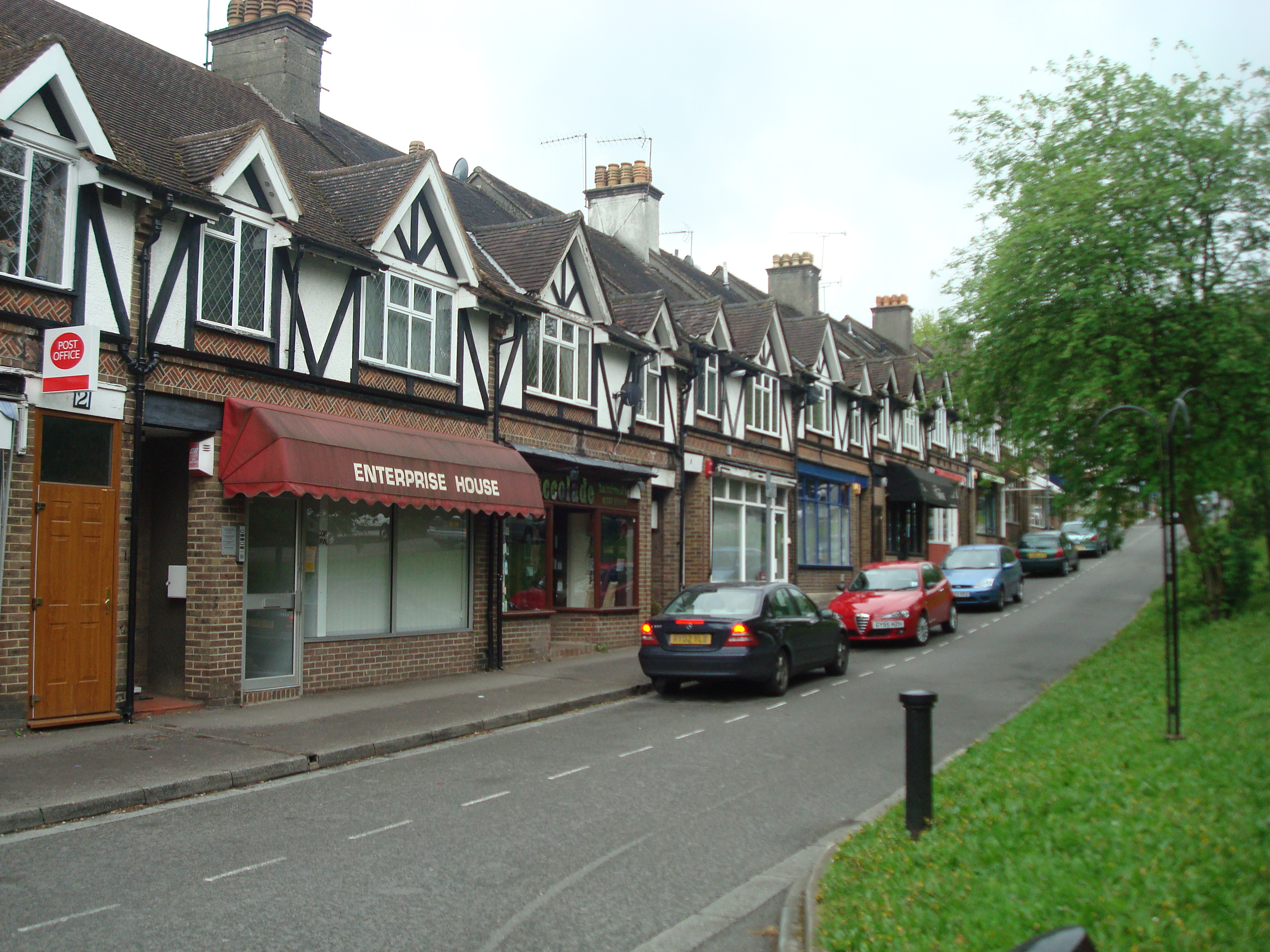
The parade at Chipstead

== History ==
The village lay within the Reigate hundred.

Chipstead appears in Domesday Book as Tepestede. It was held by William de Wateville. Its Domesday assets were: 3 hides; 7 ploughs, 1 mill worth £1, woodland worth 5 hogs. It rendered £8.

Census year	population	homes (where known)
1801	347	
1811	403	
1821	440	
1831	522	61
1841	666	81
1851	505	95
1861	541	110
1881	644	137
1891	688	142
1901	640	157
1911	876	
1921	992	215
1931	1,513	392
1951	1,548	433

From 1894 until 1933 Chipstead was part of Reigate Rural District. From 1933 to 1974 it was in Banstead Urban District. In 1951 the civil parish had a population of 1513. On 1 April 1974 the parish was abolished.

The Grade I listed church of St Margaret is in Hooley, the official hamlet of the village, with somewhat isolated geography and its own article. It was restored in 1827 when its patron was the Jolliffe family of Chipstead Court keeping its 12th century arch and foundations. The school in the Victorian era here was endowed by Mary Stephens in 1746 with land producing £70 per annum. Sir Edward Banks (builder) enterprising building contractor for public works, was in 1835 buried in the churchyard – his business partner and daughter's husband being the patrons of the church and owners of Chipstead Court since 1788.

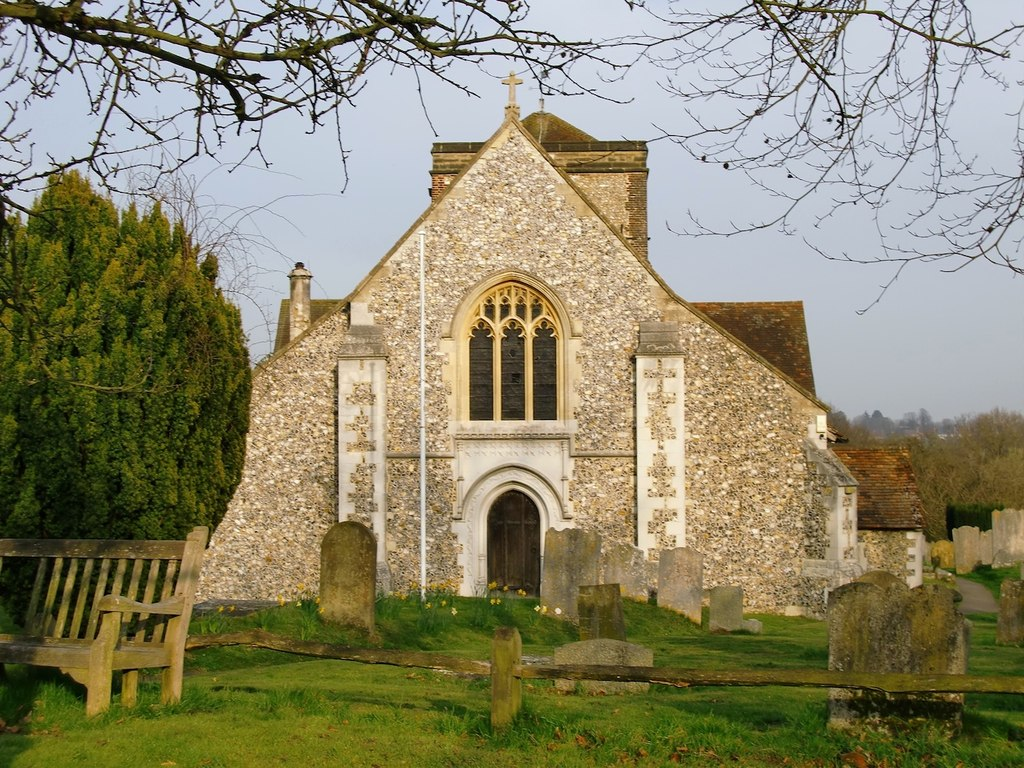
St Margaret's Church, Chipstead

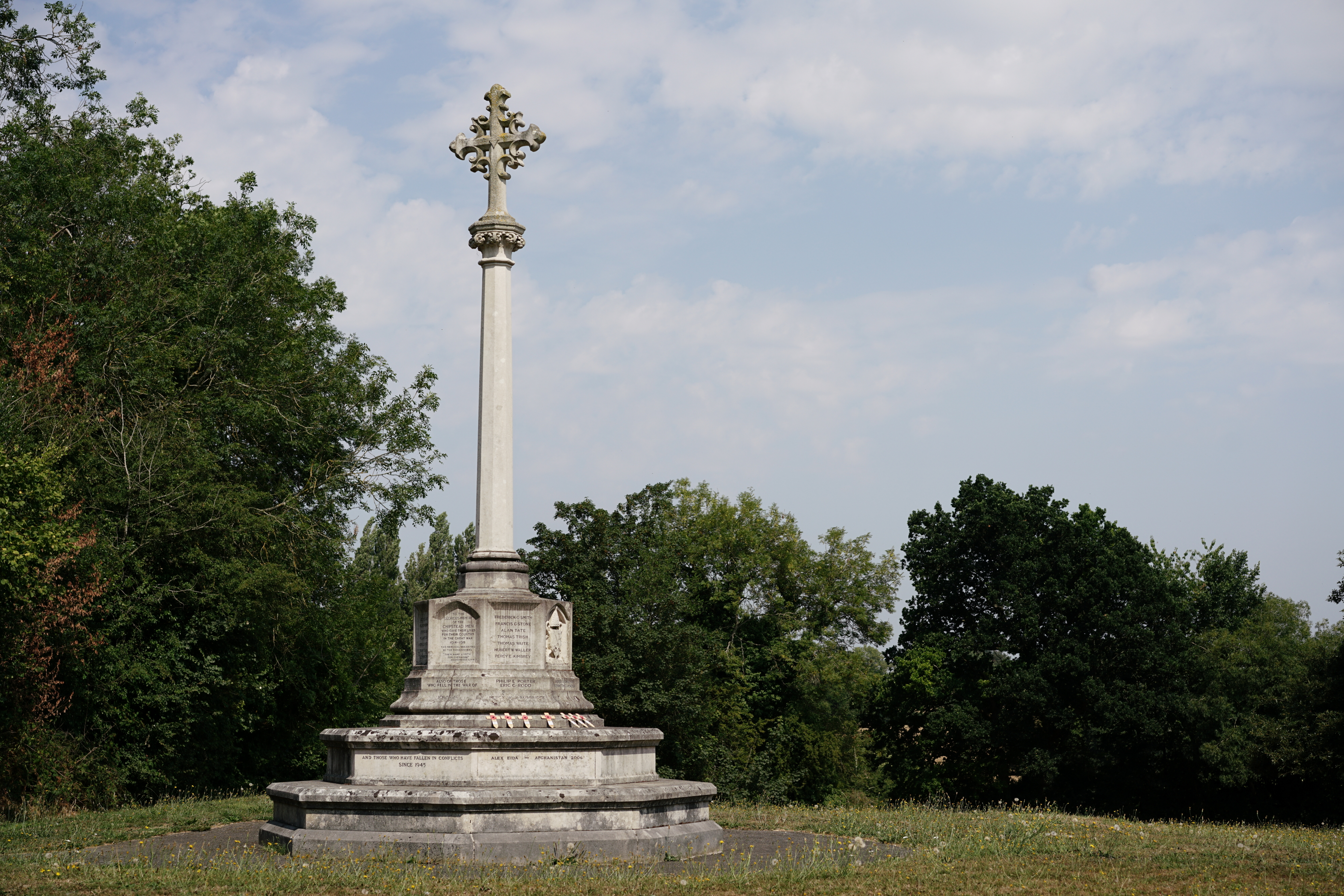
The War Memorial at Chipstead

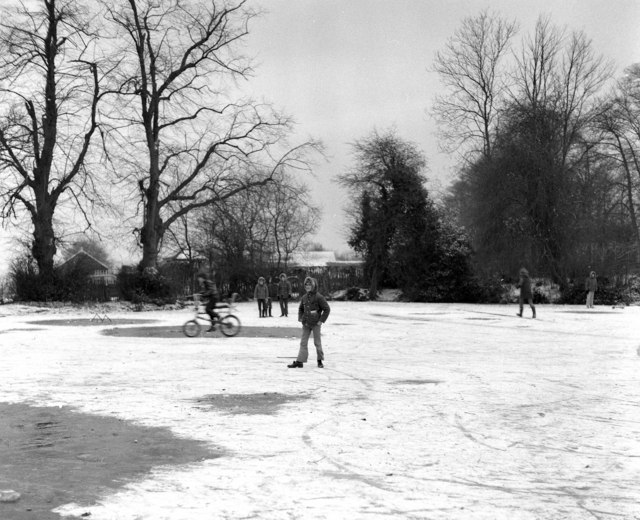
The pond at Chipstead, during the winter of 1976.

== Demography ==
The current three-member electoral ward Chipstead, Hooley and Woodmansterne had a population of 6,912 as at the United Kingdom 2011 Census.

The census areas which Chipstead occupied were drawn as Reigate and Banstead 004C and 004D. As such, Chipstead has 7.4% of the borough's area and has 2.3% of borough's population. Less than a third of the borough's own proportion of dwelling types, 8% of Chipstead homes were flats or apartments. In total 380 Chipstead residents, 24% of the population in 2011, were retired. Further common comparators for places in the United Kingdom are as shown below.

2011 Published Statistics: Population, home ownership and extracts from Physical Environment, surveyed in 2005
Measure	Chipstead	Wider borough – Reigate & Banstead
Detached	66%	28%
Semi-detached	18%	29%
Terraced	8%	17%
Flats/apartments	8%	25%
Caravan or other mobile or temporary Structures	none	0.6%
Shared Dwellings	none	0.1%
Total dwellings	1,212	57,184
Area (km²)	9.6	129.13
% of population claiming income support	1.6%	12%
Population	3,136	137,835
of which retired	24.1%	8.9%

=== Sport and leisure ===
Within the vicinity of Chipstead, there are several sports clubs, many taking the Chipstead name.

- Chipstead F.C. a Non-League football club has a minor claim to fame as some of Footballers' Wives was filmed here.
- Chipstead Rugby Football Club. They play in Counties 2 Surrey and were founded in 1959.

=== Transport ===
Chipstead railway station is on the Tattenham Corner Line.

There are no bus services through the village – route 166, run by Arriva London for London Buses, passes its suburban northern edge to serve neighbouring Woodmansterne. Route 405 passes through Hooley, a short walk from the church. Other services are at Banstead and Coulsdon.

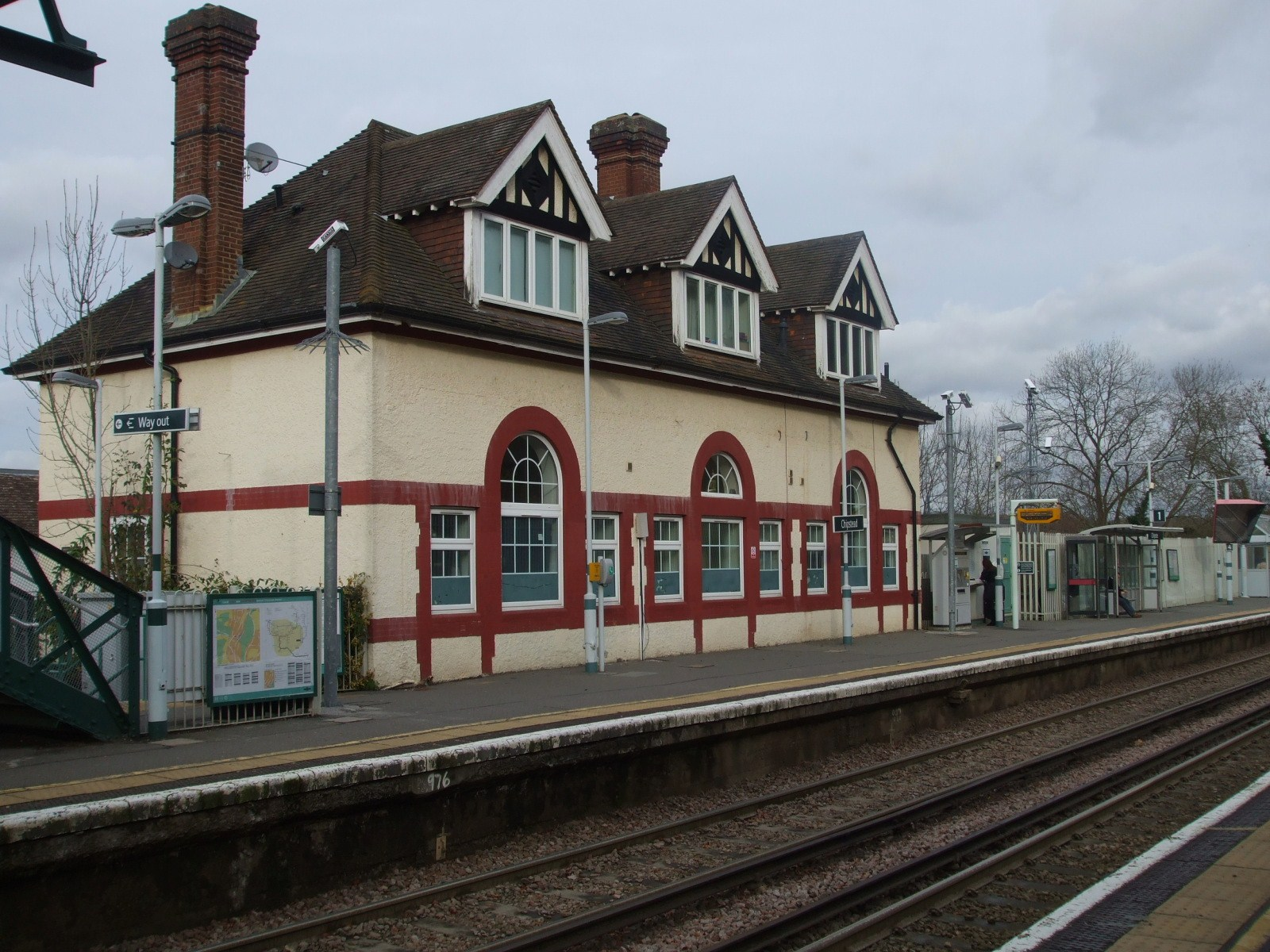
The station at Chipstead

=== Notable persons ===
- Robert Ashfield, cathedral organist, choirmaster and composer
- Crispin Aubrey, journalist
- Rosalind Brooke, historian
- June Brown, actress, lived in Chipstead.
- Tolly Burnett, cricketer
- Paul Docminique, merchant and politician
- Catherine Maria Fanshawe (1765–1834), poet, was born at Shabden in Chipstead.
- Paul Heaton, lead singer of The Housemartins
- William Hilton, Labour politician
- Mary Lucas, composer and pianist
- Sir Gordon MacWhinnie, founder of the Hong Kong Society of Accountants
- Horace Brooks Marshall, 1st Baron Marshall of Chipstead, publisher and Lord Mayor of London
- Charles Mayo, golfer, lived there in 1906.
- Danny Murphy, footballer
- Oswald Norris, cricketer
- Arthur Rhys-Davids, pilot and flying ace killed during World War I
- Caroline Rhys Davids, writer and translator
- Thomas William Rhys Davids, scholar, founder of the Pali Text Society
- Mark Serwotka, former General Secretary of the Public and Commercial Services Union
- Robert Walling, soldier and journalist
- Sidney White, cricketer
- David Wiffen, singer-songwriter

== See also ==
- List of places of worship in Reigate and Banstead
