= Edward Benson (cricketer) =

Welsh cricketer (1907–1967)

Personal information
- Full name: Edward Turk Benson
- Born: 20 November 1907; Cardiff, Wales
- Died: 11 September 1967 (aged 59); Cape Town, South Africa
- Batting: Right-handed
- Role: Wicket-keeper

Domestic team information
- Years: Team
- 1928–1929: Oxford University
- 1929–1931: Gloucestershire

Career statistics
Competition	FC
Matches	38
Runs scored	520
Batting average	12.68
100s/50s	0/0
Top score	42
Balls bowled
Wickets
Bowling average
5 wickets in innings
10 wickets in match
Best bowling
Catches/stumpings	49/12
- Source: Cricinfo, 15 February 2019

Edward Benson (20 November 1907 – 11 September 1967) was a Welsh cricketer. He played for Oxford University in 1928 and 1929, and Gloucestershire between 1929 and 1931.

Benson attended Blundell's School in Devon before going up to Merton College, Oxford in 1926. In the 1928 University Match, batting at number 11, he and Charles Hill-Wood defended for 100 minutes to deny Cambridge victory on the last day. He played for the Gentlemen at Lord's in 1929. He toured New Zealand in 1929–30 with the England Test team as the reserve wicket-keeper, but did not play any of the Test matches. In that tour against Auckland, Benson became the first batsman to be dismissed "handled the ball" in first-class cricket since Dave Nourse in 1907, and the last until Otago's Alan Gilbertson – also against Auckland – in 1952–53.

He also played Rugby union for Oxford and served in World War II as a colonel in the Royal Artillery. After the war he joined the Prudential Assurance Co. in South Africa and from about 1957 was their branch manager in Cape Town.
