= Tich Cornford =

English cricketer

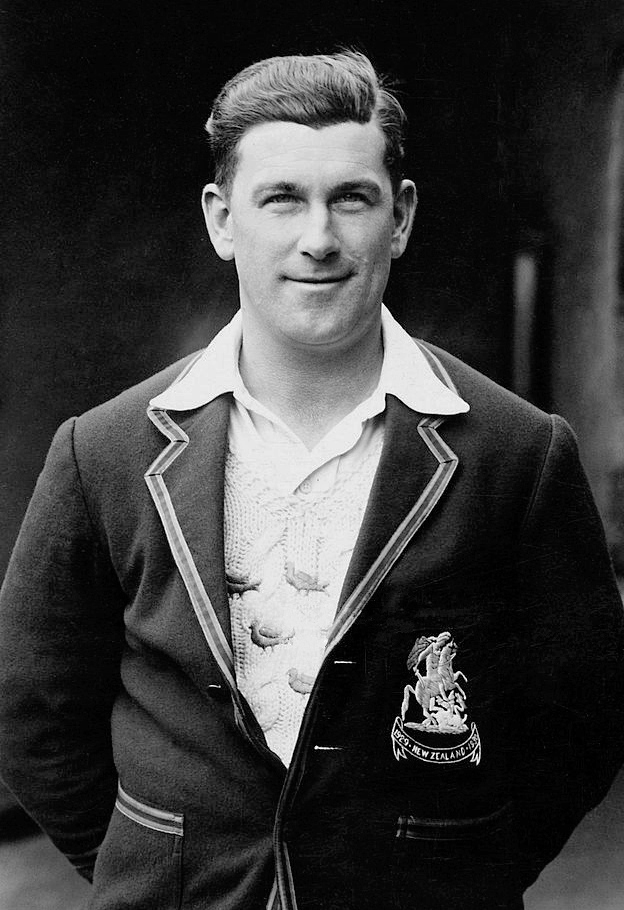
- Cornford wearing his blazer from the 1930 tour of New Zealand

Personal information
- Born: 25 December 1900; Hurst Green, East Sussex, England
- Died: 6 February 1964 (aged 63); Brighton, Sussex, England
- Batting: Right-handed

International information
- National side: England
- Test debut: 10 January 1930 v New Zealand
- Last Test: 21 February 1930 v New Zealand

Career statistics
| Competition | Test | First-class |
|---|---|---|
| Matches | 4 | 496 |
| Runs scored | 36 | 6,554 |
| Batting average | 9.00 | 14.96 |
| 100s/50s | 0/0 | 0/16 |
| Top score | 18 | 82 |
| Catches/stumpings | 5/3 | 676/342 |
- Source: ESPNcricinfo, 6 November 2022

Walter Latter Cornford (25 December 1900 – 6 February 1964) was an English cricketer. He was a wicket-keeper who played in 4 Tests in New Zealand in 1930 and played county cricket for Sussex County Cricket Club. His nickname of Tich alluded to his height of barely five feet.

His county career stretched from 1921 until the outbreak of the Second World War, but he made one further appearance in an emergency at the age of 46 in 1947.
