= Horace Brooks Marshall, 1st Baron Marshall of Chipstead =

English publisher, newspaper distributor and Lord Mayor of London

The Right Honourable The Lord Marshall of Chipstead KCVO PC
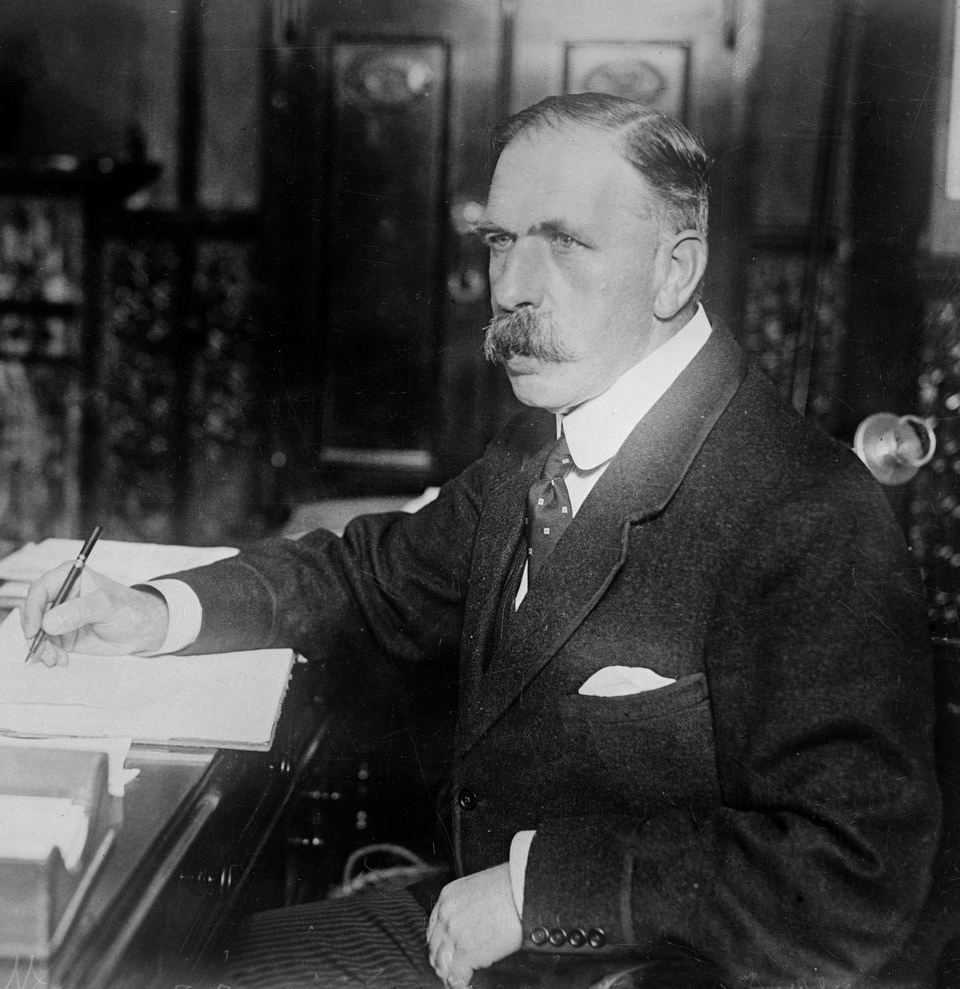
- Sir Horace Brooks Marshall, 1918

Lord Mayor of London
- In office 1918–1919

Personal details
- Born: Horace Brooks Marshall; 5 August 1865 Streatham, London, England
- Died: 29 March 1936 (aged 70)
- Occupation: Publisher, newspaper distributor

Horace Brooks Marshall, 1st Baron Marshall of Chipstead (5 August 1865 – 29 March 1936) was an English publisher and newspaper distributor and Lord Mayor of London, 1918–1919.

== Early life ==
Marshall was born in Streatham, Surrey, a suburb of London. He was educated at Dulwich College and Trinity College, Dublin, and then joined his father's wholesale newspaper business in Fleet Street. Horace Brooks Marshall Sr (1830–1896) pioneered the sale of books and publications on the railways. As Horace Marshall and Son, it became one of the largest such businesses in the United Kingdom.

== Civic career ==
After his father's death in 1896, Marshall succeeded him unopposed as a member of the Court of Common Council of the City of London for Farringdon Without. He was Sheriff during the coronation year of 1902, and was knighted in the 1902 Coronation Honours, receiving the accolade from King Edward VII at Buckingham Palace on 24 October that year. During his year as Sheriff, he also accompanied the Lord Mayor (Sir Joseph Dimsdale) on official visits to the English cities of Wolverhampton (July 1902), Bath and Exeter (September 1902).

He became alderman for Vintry Ward in 1909 and was the 591st Lord Mayor of London from 1918 to 1919. As Lord Mayor during the First World War victory celebrations, he was particularly prominent, being appointed to the Privy Council (entitling him to the style "The Right Honourable") in 1919 and appointed Knight Commander of the Royal Victorian Order (KCVO) in the 1920 New Year Honours. Marshall was raised to the peerage in the 1921 New Year Honours as Baron Marshall of Chipstead, of Chipstead in the County of Surrey, becoming the first sitting alderman of the City of London to be so honoured.

Marshall received the honorary degree Doctor of Laws (LL.D.) from the University of Dublin in June 1902.

He was appointed Honorary Colonel of the 4th (City of London) Battalion, London Regiment, on 16 October 1918.

He was buried at St Margaret's, Chipstead. His only son died in infancy and the barony thus became extinct upon his death. He had two daughters; the elder, Nellie, married J. Arthur Rank.

== Footnotes ==
Honorary titles
Preceded by Sir Charles Hanson, Bt	Lord Mayor of London; 1918–1919	Succeeded by Edward Cooper
Peerage of the United Kingdom
New creation	Baron Marshall of Chipstead; 1921–1936	Extinct
