= Harry Cave =

New Zealand cricketer (1922–1989)

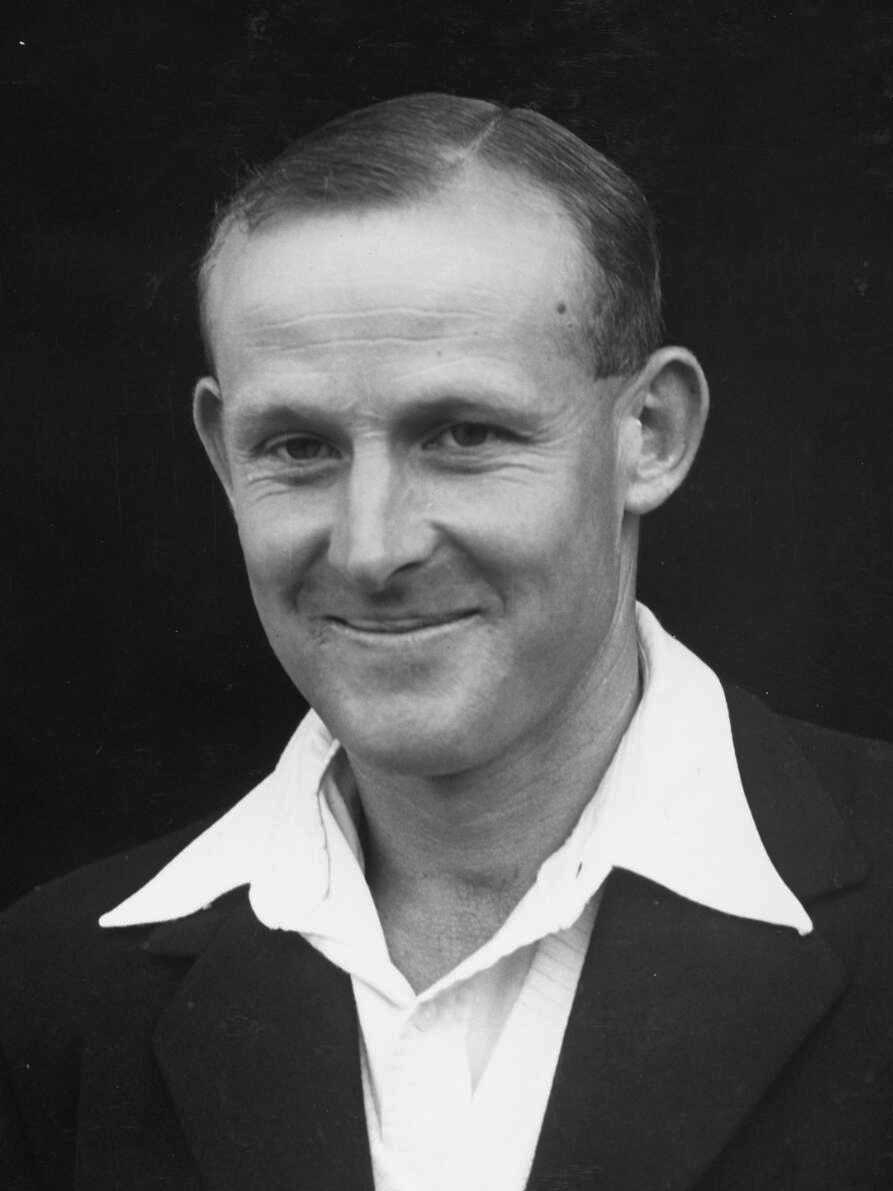
- Cave in 1957

Personal information
- Full name: Henry Butler Cave
- Born: 10 October 1922; Wanganui, New Zealand
- Died: 15 September 1989 (aged 66); Wanganui, New Zealand
- Nickname: Caveman
- Height: 6 ft 2 in (1.88 m)
- Batting: Right-handed
- Bowling: Right-arm medium
- Relatives: Ken Cave (uncle)

International information
- National side: New Zealand (1949–1958)
- Test debut (cap 46): 11 June 1949 v England
- Last Test: 3 July 1958 v England

Domestic team information
- Years: Team
- 1945/46–1949/50: Wellington
- 1950/51–1958/59: Central Districts

Career statistics
Competition	Test	First-class
Matches	19	117
Runs scored	229	2,187
Batting average	8.80	16.08
100s/50s	0/0	2/3
Top score	22*	118
Balls bowled	4,074	25,520
Wickets	34	362
Bowling average	43.14	23.93
5 wickets in innings	0	13
10 wickets in match	0	1
Best bowling	4/21	7/31
Catches/stumpings	8/–	70/–
- Source: Cricinfo, 1 April 2017

Henry Butler Cave (10 October 1922 – 15 September 1989) was a New Zealand cricketer who captained New Zealand in nine of his 19 Test matches. His Test career extended from 1949 to 1958, and he played first-class cricket from 1945 to 1959. In March 1956 he played a major part in New Zealand's first victory in Test cricket when he took eight wickets in the final match of the series against West Indies.

== Early life ==
Harry Cave was born into a family of farmers and cricketers from the Wanganui area. His father had a farm at Westmere, north of Wanganui. His uncle Ken Cave umpired all four matches in New Zealand's first Test series in 1929–30. Harry went to school at Westmere before attending Wanganui Collegiate School. He took up farming after leaving school.

== Cricket career ==
=== 1940s ===
Cave's cricket career was often interrupted by the demands of his farming life, where he was supported by his brother and farming partner Tom. An all-rounder, six feet two inches tall, Cave bowled accurate medium-pace and batted in the middle or lower order. He first played for Wanganui in his teens, and became one of their leading players in the Hawke Cup. In the 1940s, Wanganui players were eligible to play for Wellington, and he made his first-class debut for Wellington on Christmas Eve 1945. In January 1947 he took 6 for 44 (from 29 overs) and 2 for 72 when Wellington beat Canterbury in the Plunket Shield. A torn elbow muscle in 1947 made it difficult for him to bowl his stock out-swinger, and from then on he relied on seamers, cutters and in-swingers.

Cave toured England in 1949 and played in all four Tests. The tour report in Wisden described his bowling as "always steady and reliable", but on the good batting pitches of the season he took only four wickets from 141 overs in the Tests at an average of 116.25.

=== 1950s ===
Cave was one of the leading players in Central Districts' inaugural season in the Plunket Shield in 1950–51, when they finished second. In 1952–53 he and Ian Leggat added 239 for the ninth wicket for Central Districts against Otago in Dunedin, setting a New Zealand ninth-wicket record that still stands. A few days later, Cave captured 13 wickets in one day, taking 7 for 31 and 6 for 33 in Central Districts' innings victory over Auckland in Palmerston North.

In 1953–54 Cave became captain of Central Districts, and led them to the Plunket Shield title for the first time. He also led the competition bowling averages with 24 wickets at an average of 15.50.

After a break of five years, Cave returned to the Test team for the two-match series against England in 1954–55. He was then appointed to captain the New Zealand team on an eight-Test tour of Pakistan and India from October 1955 to January 1956. The tour was demanding for the whole team. Extreme heat, sub-standard accommodation and facilities, unfamiliar pitches, constant stomach upsets and other illness, as well as dubious umpiring in India, made it difficult for the New Zealanders to play at their best. Cave remained diplomatic throughout, and bowled more overs than any other player: 333 overs for 623 runs and 13 wickets. Always of trim build, he nevertheless lost about 11 kilograms in weight on the tour, and it took him two years to recover full fitness.

When the team returned to New Zealand, Cave was captain in the First Test against the West Indies a few weeks later. He was unable to play in the Second Test, then returned for the Third and Fourth Tests under the captaincy of John Reid. In the Fourth Test in Auckland, he had his best Test figures, taking four wickets in each innings to help New Zealand to its first Test victory. He had match figures of 40.4–26–43–8, and took the wicket to end the match when he had Alf Valentine stumped by Sammy Guillen.

Cave was New Zealand's leading bowler when the Australians toured in 1956–57, taking 17 wickets in the three unofficial Tests while the other New Zealand bowlers took 17 wickets between them. Cave toured England in 1958, this time as John Reid's vice-captain, but the tour was not a success for him or the team. He took 50 wickets at an average of 22.02 in the first-class matches, but played in only two of the five Tests, taking two wickets.

Cave played one more season of Plunket Shield cricket in 1958–59 before retiring. He later served as a Test selector.

== Personal life ==
Cave married Vonnie Anderson at Wanganui on 28 April 1951; they had two sons. He and his wife were keen camellia growers, and he developed a variety that was named after him. He died at Wanganui on 15 September 1989. Vonnie was appointed a Member of the New Zealand Order of Merit, for services to photography and horticulture, in the 2009 Queen's Birthday Honours, and she died in Whanganui in 2021.

Sporting positions
Preceded by Geoff Rabone	New Zealand national cricket captain 1955/6	Succeeded by John R. Reid
