= Norman Mitchell (sportsman) =

Australian sportsman

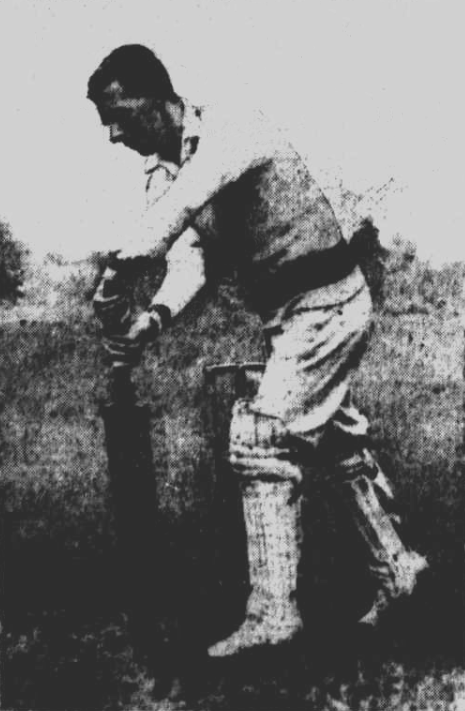

Personal information
- Full name: Norman Frederick Mitchell
- Born: 19 February 1900; Collingwood, Victoria
- Died: 8 March 1973 (aged 73); East Melbourne, Victoria
- Batting: Right-handed

Domestic team information
- Years: Team
- 1925/26–1926/27: Victoria

Career statistics
Competition	First-class
Matches	4
Runs scored	312
Batting average	52.00
100s/50s	1/0
Top score	220
Balls bowled	135
Wickets	3
Bowling average	20.33
5 wickets in innings	0
10 wickets in match	0
Best bowling	1/9
Catches/stumpings	6/–
- Source: CricketArchive, 31 December 2014

Norman Frederick Mitchell (19 February 1900 – 8 March 1973) was an Australian sportsman who played first-class cricket for Victoria in the Sheffield Shield and Australian rules football with St Kilda in the Victorian Football League (VFL).

Mitchell's three VFL games came midway through the 1925 season and were against Fitzroy, South Melbourne and Essendon. An Old Melburnian, he played his early football at Melbourne University.

As a cricketer he was a right-handed opening batsman and got few opportunities to represent Victoria because they had a prolific pair in Bill Woodfull and Bill Ponsford. In the four first-class matches that he was picked in, two of them in the Sheffield Shield, it was as a middle order batsman. He made the most of his chance in a match against Tasmania at the Melbourne Cricket Ground in 1926/27 when he scored 220 of Victoria's 552 first innings runs. Mitchell then dismissed Tasmanian Alfred Watson twice with the ball and also took three catches to round off a good all round performance. His only other wicket at first-class level had come on his debut against New Zealand and was All Blacks rugby player Charlie Oliver. Despite Mitchell's efforts in the Tasmania match, he wasn't picked for Victoria ever again.

Later on in his life, Mitchell became a County Court Judge.
