= Catherine Maria Fanshawe =

English poet and artist

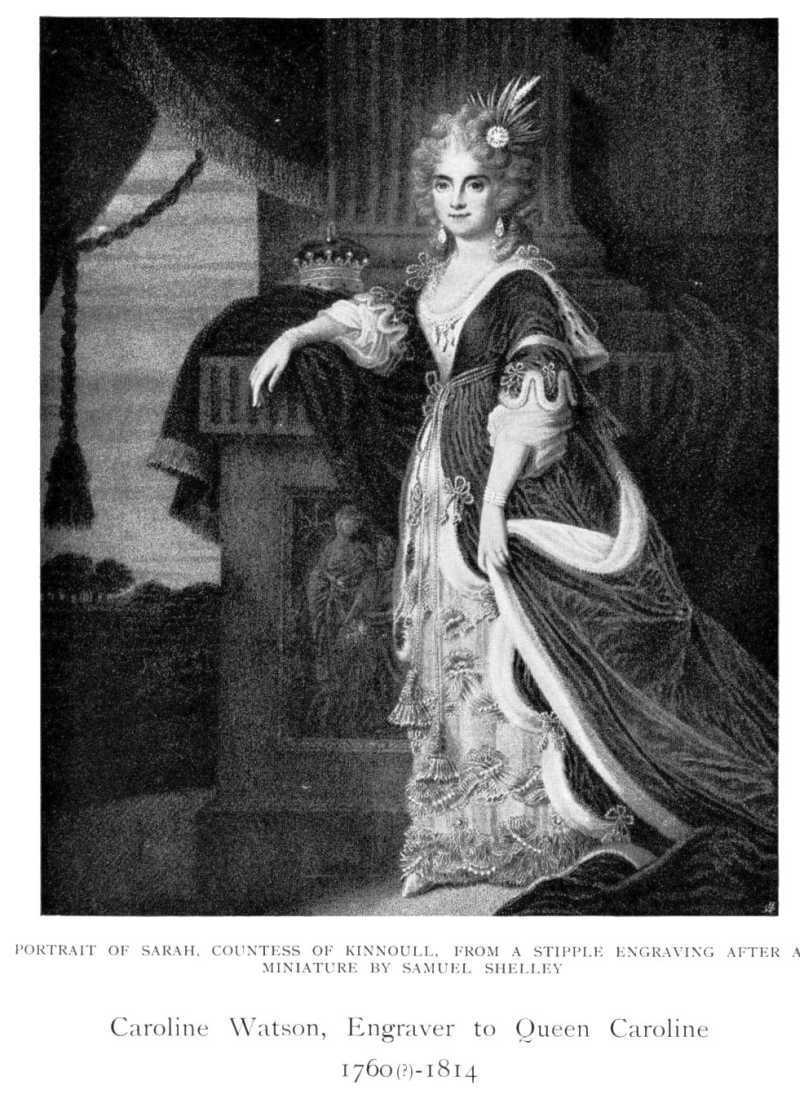
- Born: 6 July 1765; Chipstead
- Died: 17 April 1834; Putney
- Occupations: Poet, etcher, writer

Catherine Maria Fanshawe (1765–1834) was an English poet whose work was praised by Walter Scott. She and her sisters were also artists.

== Biography ==
Catherine Maria Fanshawe was born at Shabden in Chipstead, Surrey, 1765. She was the daughter of John Fanshawe (1738–1816), a Surrey squire, and his wife Penelope (née Dredge). Fanshawe's father held a post in the household of King George III.

After the father's death in 1816, Fanshawe and her two sisters were co-heirs. They lived at 15 Berkeley Square, London, and at Midhurst House, Richmond, Surrey, but also visited Italy due to their poor health.

Fanshawe died after a long illness at Putney Heath, then in Surrey, on 17 April 1834.

== Work ==
Fanshawe wrote clever occasional verse after the Romantic school. Some of her poems were printed in publications by Joanna Baillie and Mary Russell Mitford in 1823 and 1859, then together in 1865 and 1876. Mitford described her as "admirable as a letter-writer, as a reader of Shakespeare, and as a designer in almost every style." Her poems "sparkle with irony. She mimics political voices she disagrees with." The diary she kept has not been found. Fanshawe's best-known production is the famous "Riddle on the Letter H", beginning "'Twas whispered in heaven and 'twas muttered in hell," which has often been attributed to Byron. Her "Fragment in Imitation of Wordsworth" appears in the Oxford Book of Parodies (edited by John Gross).

Walter Scott admired her poetry as "quite beautiful". He also related that Catherine and her sisters were the first publishers of the Memoirs of Ann, Lady Fanshawe (1625–1680), which cover her life up to 1672 and were completed in 1676. These appeared in 1829.
