= Paul Dunkels =

English cricketer and barrister

Personal information
- Full name: Paul Renton Dunkels
- Born: 26 November 1947 (age 78); Marylebone, London, England
- Height: 6 ft 10 in (2.08 m)
- Batting: Left-handed
- Bowling: Right-arm medium

Domestic team information
- Years: Team
- 1972: Sussex
- 1971: Minor Counties
- 1971: Warwickshire
- 1969–1975: Devon

Career statistics
Competition	First-class
Matches	3
Runs scored	3
Batting average	3.00
100s/50s	–/–
Top score	3*
Balls bowled	508
Wickets	3
Bowling average	84.33
5 wickets in innings	–
10 wickets in match	–
Best bowling	2/60
Catches/stumpings	–/–
- Source: Cricinfo, 17 April 2011

Paul Renton Dunkels Q.C. (born 26 November 1947) is a former English cricketer who is currently a barrister.

Dunkels was a left-handed batsman who bowled right-arm medium pace. He was born in Marylebone, London and was educated at Harrow School, where he represented the school cricket team. Standing 6 ft 10in, Dunkels was one of the tallest first-class cricketers of all time. Dunkels first played county cricket for Devon in the 1969 Minor Counties Championship against the Somerset Second XI. He played Minor counties cricket for Devon from 1969 to 1975, playing 29 matches for the county. He additionally played for three first-class teams, playing a single first-class match for each one. His first-class debut came for Warwickshire in 1971 against the touring Indians. His second first-class match came in the same season for a combined Minor Counties team against the same opposition. The following season he played his third and final first-class match, this time for Sussex against Cambridge University. Despite his remarkable height, Dunkels was not a bowler who could bowl with great pace or generate steepling bounce, instead bowling medium pace. His three first-class matches yielded three wickets at an expensive bowling average of 84.33, with all three of his wickets coming for Sussex.

He was called to the bar in 1972, and appointed as a Queen's Counsel in 1993. He is currently practising on the Western Circuit, and is a door tenant at Albion Chambers in Bristol and a member at Walnut House Chambers, Exeter.
