= Stan Nichols =

English cricketer

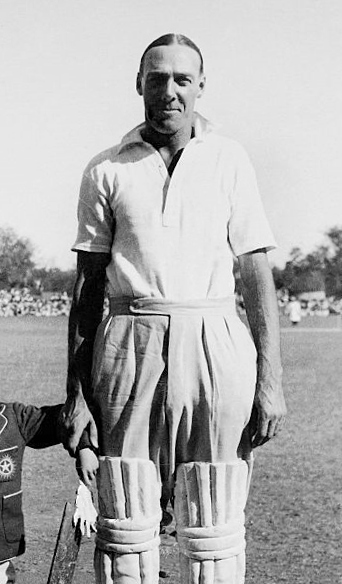
- Nichols in India in 1934

Personal information
- Born: 6 October 1900; Stondon Massey, Essex, England
- Died: 26 January 1961 (aged 60); Newark, Nottinghamshire, England
- Batting: Left-handed
- Bowling: Right-arm fast

International information
- National side: England
- Test debut (cap 249): 10 January 1930 v New Zealand
- Last Test: 22 August 1939 v West Indies

Career statistics
| Competition | Test | First-class |
|---|---|---|
| Matches | 14 | 483 |
| Runs scored | 355 | 17,823 |
| Batting average | 29.58 | 26.56 |
| 100s/50s | 0/2 | 20/92 |
| Top score | 78* | 205 |
| Balls bowled | 2,565 | 83,604 |
| Wickets | 41 | 1,833 |
| Bowling average | 28.09 | 21.63 |
| 5 wickets in innings | 2 | 118 |
| 10 wickets in match | 0 | 23 |
| Best bowling | 6/35 | 9/32 |
| Catches/stumpings | 11/– | 325/– |
- Source: CricketArchive, 30 December 2021

Morris Stanley Nichols (6 October 1900 – 26 January 1961) was the leading all-rounder in English cricket for much of the 1930s.

== Career ==
In his youth primarily a football goalkeeper who played for some time with Queen's Park Rangers, Nichols' prowess at cricket during the summer brought him to the attention of the Essex committee during the early 1920s, who recommended him as a left-handed batsman. He was engaged for 1924 but did not gain a regular place in the first eleven that year. The following year, however, Nichols gained a regular place as a promising fast bowler and batted very low in the order. He did nothing sensational apart from playing the primary role in dismissing Kent for 43 on a bad wicket at Southend in late July.

1926 was Nichols' breakthrough year, for he took 114 wickets in first-class cricket and, though he at this point often tried to bowl too fast and was sometimes wayward, his strong build meant he could bowl for long spells without tiring. Against Kent on a somewhat difficult wicket, he took ten wickets, whilst in the return with that county, he scored 57 batting at number eleven. In 1927, Nichols took 124 wickets for 23 runs each, with several strong performances: including nine for 59 against Hampshire at Chelmsford; eight for 46 against Derbyshire at Southend; and nine for 32 (4 for 12 and 5 for 20) against Somerset at Colchester.

He scored 940 runs that year, but though 1928 saw a maiden century against Hampshire, he took fewer than 70 wickets for over 35 runs apiece. 1929, however, saw Nichols establish himself as a strong all-rounder. His hard-hitting left-handed batting had become strong in front of the wicket, whilst reducing his pace made his bowling less wayward and more effective. So highly though of was Nichols that the following year he played for England in the Ashes series of 1930 but did little; however, his batting in two Representative Matches (since canonised as Tests) in New Zealand had been successful.

With Larwood, Bowes and Gubby Allen the first-choice pace bowlers by this time, Nichols had little opportunity in the following years for playing in home Tests or Ashes tours; however his county form, apart from a decline in his bowling in 1934 due to injury, remained consistent and he was rewarded by a Cricketer of the Year nomination in the 1934 Wisden after his batting and bowling gave Essex their best season since 1897. On the matting wickets of India, his bowling proved highly effective in England's first Test tour of that country. 1935, with Larwood and Voce refusing to be considered due to the Bodyline controversy of the previous three years, Farnes injured and Allen having work commitments, gave Nichols his chance to establish himself as an England player, whereupon he took six for 35 against South Africa in the First Test at Trent Bridge, and played a further 3 tests in that series. That summer also saw Nichols produce his best cricket to date with 157 wickets and over 1400 runs in all matches, including an all-round feat in a defeat of Yorkshire at Huddersfield. In this match, Nichols took 11 for 54 and made 146, and Yorkshire lost by an innings and 204 runs.

1936 saw Nichols make his only double century, against Hampshire, and take nine for 32 against Nottinghamshire at Trent Bridge, whilst 1937 and 1938 were seasons of consistent achievement culminating in an all-round performance of 159 and fifteen for 163 against Gloucestershire in the latter season. His haul of wickets in 1938 – 171 – surpassed his best and placed him within three of being leading wicket takers in England, whilst continued good form in 1939 saw Nichols obtain a Test recall against the West Indies in the last Test before World War II put a stop to county cricket.

When first-class cricket resumed in 1946, Nichols was forty-five and struggling with fitness. He played for several years in the Birmingham and District League until his health declined beyond his ability to play even one-day-a-week cricket and he retired to the spa resorts in the English Midlands. He died early in 1961 in Newark.
