= Chipstead Downs =

Protected area in Surrey, England

Coordinates: 51.305°N 0.185°W

- Site of Special Scientific Interest
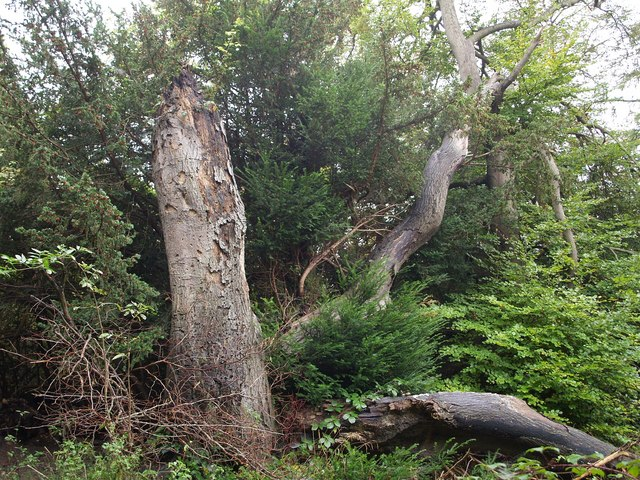
- Location of Chipstead Downs.
- Area of search: Surrey
- Grid reference: TQ 266 578
- Interest: Biological
- Area: 157.8 hectares (390 acres)
- Notification date: 1985
- Location map: Magic Map

Chipstead Downs is a 157.8-hectare (390-acre) biological Site of Special Scientific Interest south-east of Banstead in Surrey, England. Part of it is Park Downs, which is managed by the Banstead Commons Conservators.

This site has ancient woodland and steeply sloping chalk grassland together with associated secondary woodland and scrub. A large part of the grassland is dominated by tor-grass, but in some areas mowing and rabbit grazing have produced a rich chalk grassland flora including the endangered greater yellow-rattle. There are rich bird and butterfly fauna.

Most of the site is public open space which is owned by Surrey County Council and managed by Reigate and Banstead Borough Council.
