= Kenneth Cave =

New Zealand cricket umpire

Personal information
- Full name: Kenneth Holmes Cave
- Born: 25 February 1874; Sunderland, England
- Died: 19 May 1944 (aged 70); Wanganui, New Zealand

Umpiring information
- Tests umpired: 6 (1930–1933)
- Source: Cricinfo, 2 July 2013

Kenneth Holmes Cave (25 February 1874 – 19 May 1944) was a New Zealand cricket umpire. He stood in six Test matches between 1930 and 1933.

Ken Cave was a member of a large family of cricketers in the Whanganui area. A middle-order batsman, he played for Whanganui teams from the late 1890s till the mid-1920s, and was one of their leading batsmen when they held the Hawke Cup in 1914-15 and 1925–26.

He became an umpire in the Whanganui area in the 1920s. Without having umpired a first-class match, but with the support of the English touring team, he was chosen to umpire all four matches in New Zealand's first Test series, against England in 1929-30. He also umpired two of New Zealand's other four home Tests in the 1930s.

Cave's nephew Harry Cave captained the New Zealand Test team in the 1950s.

== See also ==
- List of Test cricket umpires
