= Anthony Allom =

English cricketer

Personal information
- Full name: Anthony Thomas Carrick Allom
- Born: 21 October 1938; Bletchingley, Surrey, England
- Died: 26 September 2017 (aged 78); Nunney, Somerset, England
- Height: 6 ft 9 in (2.06 m)
- Batting: Right handed
- Bowling: Right-arm medium-fast

Domestic team information
- Years: Team
- 1960: Surrey

Career statistics
Competition	First-class
Matches	5
Runs scored	94
Batting average	18.80
100s/50s	-/-
Top score	34*
Balls bowled	835
Wickets	15
Bowling average	29.26
5 wickets in innings	1
10 wickets in match	-
Best bowling	5/79
Catches/stumpings	1/-
- Source: , 7 August 2008

Anthony Thomas Carrick Allom (21 October 1938 – 26 September 2017) was an English cricketer who played first-class cricket for Free Foresters, Marylebone Cricket Club (MCC) and Surrey between 1959 and 1961.

His highest score of 34 not out came when playing for Free Foresters in the match against Oxford University in 1959, his first-class debut. His best bowling of 5/79 came in the same match.

He also played three Second XI Championship matches and seven Minor Counties Championship games for Surrey Second XI. His solitary first-team county appearance occurred in a high-scoring draw against Warwickshire at The Oval in July 1960, failing to capture a wicket as Norman Horner and Khalid Ibadulla compiled an unbroken first-wicket partnership of 377.

One of the tallest county cricketers of all time, his height was measured at 6 feet 9 inches or maybe an inch taller (thus equalling Paul Dunkels and Will Jefferson). When he was a schoolboy cricketer at Charterhouse, where he played in the first XI from 1954 to 1957, Wisden gave his height as 6 feet 10 1/2 inches.

His father was the England Test player Maurice Allom.
