= Lindsay Weir (cricketer) =

New Zealand cricketer

Personal information
- Full name: Gordon Lindsay Weir
- Born: 2 June 1908; Auckland, New Zealand
- Died: 31 October 2003 (aged 95); Auckland, New Zealand
- Nickname: Dad
- Batting: Right-handed
- Bowling: Right-arm medium

International information
- National side: New Zealand (1930–1937)
- Test debut (cap 14): 24 January 1930 v England
- Last Test: 14 August 1937 v England

Domestic team information
- Years: Team
- 1927/28–1946/47: Auckland

Career statistics
Competition	Test	First-class
Matches	11	107
Runs scored	416	5,022
Batting average	29.71	32.19
100s/50s	0/3	10/26
Top score	74*	191
Balls bowled	342	9,395
Wickets	7	107
Bowling average	29.85	37.35
5 wickets in innings	0	2
10 wickets in match	0	0
Best bowling	3/38	6/56
Catches/stumpings	3/–	70/–
- Source: Cricinfo, 1 April 2017

Gordon Lindsay Weir (2 June 1908 – 31 October 2003) was a New Zealand cricketer who played 11 Test matches for New Zealand from 1930 to 1937. He lost his hair early and looked older than his teammates, so he became known as Dad Weir. He was the world's oldest Test cricketer upon his death.

== Domestic career ==
Weir was born in Auckland. He was a right-hand batsman and a right-arm medium-paced bowler. He also made nine first-class appearances for the Auckland rugby union team, playing mainly at fly-half.

He played first-class cricket for Auckland from 1927–28 to 1946–47, scoring ten centuries and taking 107 wickets. An accomplished stroke player, he achieved his highest first-class score, 191, against Otago in December 1935.

== International career ==
Weir was not selected for New Zealand's first Test match, against the touring England side in 1930, but played in the three other Tests of the series. He also played in all three Tests on New Zealand's tour to England in 1931, scoring 1,035 runs on the tour at a batting average of 25.87, including 96 runs at 24.00 in the Tests. Back home, he played two Tests against South Africa in 1932 and two against England in 1933. He did not play in the 1935–36 series against the MCC but was recalled for a last Test at The Oval in 1937. He scored three Test half-centuries and took seven Test wickets.

== Late career ==
After the Second World War, Weir was the selector-coach of the Auckland teenage Brabin Cup team for 12 years. He taught English at Mount Albert Grammar School in Auckland, where he also coached rugby and cricket.

Weir became the oldest living Test cricketer in 2001, after the death of English cricketer Alf Gover, against whom Weir had played in the Test at the Oval in 1937. He died in Auckland in 2003 and was succeeded as the world's oldest Test cricketer by Indian cricketer M. J. Gopalan.

== See also ==
- List of Auckland representative cricketers

Preceded by Alf Gover	Oldest Living Test Cricketer; 7 October 2001 – 31 October 2003	Succeeded by M. J. Gopalan
