= Maurice Allom =

English cricketer (1906–1995)

Personal information
- Full name: Maurice James Carrick Allom
- Born: 23 March 1906; Northwood, Middlesex, England
- Died: 8 April 1995 (aged 89); Shipbourne, Kent, England
- Batting: Right-handed
- Bowling: Right-arm medium-fast
- Role: Bowler

International information
- National side: England

Domestic team information
- Years: Team
- 1926–1928: Cambridge University
- 1927–1937: Surrey

Career statistics
Competition	Tests	First-class
Matches	5	179
Runs scored	14	1953
Batting average	14.00	12.84
100s/50s	0/0	0/5
Top score	8*	64
Balls bowled	817	34133
Wickets	14	605
Bowling average	18.92	23.62
5 wickets in innings	1	30
10 wickets in match	0	3
Best bowling	5/38	9/55
Catches/stumpings	0/–	83/–
- Source: Cricinfo, 2 July 2021

Maurice James Carrick Allom (23 March 1906 – 8 April 1995) was an English amateur cricketer who played in five Tests from 1930 to 1931.

== Life and career ==
Allom attended Wellington College, Berkshire, before going up to Trinity College, Cambridge. He played cricket for Cambridge University from 1926 to 1928 and for Surrey from 1927 to 1937.

He toured with the English Test team to New Zealand in 1929-30, where he played all four Tests, and to South Africa in 1930-31, where he played one Test. He and his former Cambridge team-mate Maurice Turnbull wrote a book about each tour: The Book of the Two Maurices: Being some account of the tour of an M.C.C. team through Australia and New Zealand in the closing months of 1929 and the beginning of 1930 (1930) and The Two Maurices Again: Being some account of the tour of the M.C.C. team through South Africa in the closing months of 1930 and the beginning of 1931 (1931).

Almost 6 feet 6 inches tall, Allom was able to get the ball to rise sharply off the pitch. His most successful season was 1930, when he took 108 wickets at 23.33, twice dismissing Don Bradman. His best innings figures were 9 for 55, for Cambridge against The Army in 1927.

Along with Peter Petherick and Damien Fleming, Allom is one of only three players to have taken a hat-trick on Test debut. It was also New Zealand's first Test match. In the same Test, he also became the first Test player to take four wickets in five balls, a feat later matched by Chris Old and Wasim Akram. He finished with first innings figures of 5 for 38, and added 3 for 17 in the second innings. England won by eight wickets.

He served as Surrey's President from 1970 to 1977, and as President of Marylebone Cricket Club (MCC) in 1969–70. He was a member of MCC for 70 years, from 1925 until his death. He was also a skilful saxophonist, who played in Fred Elizalde's band in the 1920s.

Allom was married for almost half a century to Pamela, and after she died in 1980 he married the widow of the pre-war Lancashire captain Peter Eckersley, who had died on active service in 1940. His son Anthony played first-class cricket for Surrey and was one of the tallest people to have played the game, standing between 6 ft 9 ins and 6 ft 10 ins (around 2.07 m).
