= Derbyshire County Cricket Club in 1937 =

1937 season of an English cricket team

Derbyshire County Cricket Club seasons
1937 season
- Captain: Robin Buckston
- County Championship: 3
- Most runs: Denis Smith
- Most wickets: Tommy Mitchell
- Most catches: Harry Elliott

Derbyshire County Cricket Club in 1937 was the cricket season when the English club Derbyshire had been playing for sixty six years. It was their thirty-ninth season in the County Championship and they came third after winning the Championship in 1936.

== 1937 season ==
Derbyshire played 28 games in the County Championship, and one match against the touring New Zealanders. They won 15 matches including the game against the New Zealanders and lost six to finish third in the County Championship.

Robin Buckston took over the captaincy having last played for the club in the 1928 season. Denis Smith was top scorer. Tommy Mitchell took most wickets but Bill Copson made a particular impression taking eight wickets for eleven runs against Warwickshire in the first innings at Derby which included four wickets with successive balls. Worthington also played for England in Test matches touring Australia.

Dusty Rhodes began his long and successful bowling career for Derbyshire during the season. The only other newcomer, Howard Sherwin played one career first class match for the club in 1937.

=== Matches ===
List of matches
No.	Date	V	Result	Margin	Notes
1	1 May 1937	Lancashire; Old Trafford, Manchester	Drawn		T S Worthington 103; Paynter 150; Pollard 6-76; T. B. Mitchell 6-73
2	8 May 1937	Worcestershire; County Ground, New Road, Worcester	Lost	3 wickets	Martin 5-69
3	12 May 1937	Surrey; Kennington Oval	Drawn		
4	15 May 1937	Essex; County Ground, Chelmsford	Won	74 runs	T Smith 5-86 and 6-35; L F Townsend 5-49
5	22 May 1937	Kent; County Ground, Derby	Won	82 runs	Wright 6-73; Watt 6-34
6	26 May 1937	Somerset; Rutland Recreation Ground, Ilkeston	Won	7 wickets	T. B. Mitchell 6-34; Andrews 5-28
7	29 May 1937	Yorkshire; Queen's Park, Chesterfield	Lost	6 wickets	T. B. Mitchell 6-101
8	2 Jun 1937	Lancashire; The Town Ground, Burton-on-Trent	Drawn		Phillipson 5-62; W H Copson 5-73; Sibbles 5-78
9	5 Jun 1937	New Zealand cricket team in England in 1937; County Ground, Derby	Won	202 runs	A E Alderman 112; T. B. Mitchell 5-101 and 5-75
10	9 Jun 1937	Hampshire; County Ground, Southampton	Won	199 runs	Herman 5-56; G H Pope 5-34
11	12 Jun 1937	Sussex; Cricket Field Road Ground, Horsham	Won	281 runs	T S Worthington 133; A E Alderman 103; Langridge 102; Hammond 5-86
12	19 Jun 1937	Yorkshire; Bramall Lane, Sheffield	Lost	Innings and 99 runs	Hutton 271; D Smith 158; Turner 5-45;
13	23 Jun 1937	Hampshire; Queen's Park, Chesterfield	Drawn		D Smith 140; Pothecary 115; Arnold 105; T. B. Mitchell 5-101;
14	26 Jun 1937	Gloucestershire; Park Road Ground, Buxton	Won	Innings and 133 runs	T R Armstrong 7-36; Goddard 5-119
15	3 Jul 1937	Warwickshire; Edgbaston, Birmingham	Drawn		Wyatt 232; Dollery 128; Hollies 6-50
16	7 Jul 1937	Surrey; County Ground, Derby	Drawn		Squires 139; G H Pope 122; Gover 5-70
17	10 Jul 1937	Leicestershire; Queen's Park, Chesterfield	Won	Innings and 199 runs	A E Alderman 175; D Smith 121; T. B. Mitchell 6-50
18	14 Jul 1937	Somerset; County Ground, Taunton	Won	118 runs	L F Townsend 110 and 5-44; AEG Rhodes 6-38
19	17 Jul 1937	Warwickshire; County Ground, Derby	Won	5 wickets	Hill 105; W H Copson 8-11; Mayer 5-83 and 5-39
20	24 Jul 1937	Nottinghamshire; Queen's Park, Chesterfield	Won	Innings and 23 runs	T. B. Mitchell 6-74
21	31 Jul 1937	Essex; Rutland Recreation Ground, Ilkeston	Lost	6 wickets	G H Pope 151; W H Copson 5-99; Farnes 7-41; T Smith 6-130
22	4 Aug 1937	Northamptonshire; County Ground, Northampton	Drawn		Timms 116
23	7 Aug 1937	Northamptonshire; Queen's Park, Chesterfield	Won	9 wickets	D Smith 104; G H Pope 101 and 6-43; T. B. Mitchell 6-63
24	11 Aug 1937	Gloucestershire; College Ground, Cheltenham	Lost	Innings and 84 runs	Allen 128; L F Townsend 5-59; Goddard 7-104 and 5-41; Sinfield 5-36
25	14 Aug 1937	Nottinghamshire; Trent Bridge, Nottingham	Drawn		D Smith 202; Keeton 101
26	18 Aug 1937	Sussex; County Ground, Derby	Won	9 wickets	T S Worthington 238; Langridge 123; W H Copson 8-64; T. B. Mitchell 5-87
27	21 Aug 1937	Worcestershire; Queen's Park, Chesterfield	Won	45 runs	Kimpton 106
28	25 Aug 1937	Leicestershire; Bath Grounds, Ashby-de-la-Zouch	Won	32 runs	Prentice 131; Flamson 6-50;
29	28 Aug 1937	Kent; Cheriton Road Sports Ground, Folkestone	Lost	100 runs	Ames 108; A V Pope 5-85; G H Pope 5-35

== Statistics ==
=== County Championship batting averages ===
Name	Matches	Inns	Runs	High score	Average	100s
TS Worthington	25	43	1520	238*	40.00	3
D Smith	28	48	1799	202*	39.97	5
GH Pope	28	42	1242	151	34.50	3
AE Alderman	28	48	1397	175	32.48	2
LF Townsend	28	44	1194	110	27.76	1
AF Skinner	12	19	465	82	27.35	0
AV Pope	27	36	719	86	23.96	0
AEG Rhodes	15	19	363	83	21.35	0
GF Hodgkinson	1	2	37	24	18.50	0
CS Elliott	11	17	309	54	18.17	0
GR Langdale	1	2	13	9*	13.00	0
RHR Buckston	25	33	303	38	12.62	0
E Carrington	6	9	109	49	12.11	0
WH Copson	16	21	131	30*	11.90	0
H Elliott	26	35	376	40	11.75	0
TB Mitchell	25	29	209	57	8.70	0
AF Townsend	3	2	17	17	8.50	0
H Sherwin	1	2	12	9*		0
TR Armstrong	2	2	18	18*		0

=== County Championship bowling averages ===
Name	Balls	Runs	Wickets	BB	Average
TB Mitchell	4232	2661	119	6-34	22.36
GH Pope	4191	1851	87	6-43	21.27
WH Copson	2822	1343	72	8-11	18.65
AV Pope	4900	1862	67	5-85	27.79
LF Townsend	1990	806	34	5-44	23.70
AEG Rhodes	1339	693	25	6-38	27.72
TS Worthington	726	345	10	3-17	34.50
TR Armstrong	312	153	9	7-36	17.00
GR Langdale	72	46	2	2-29	23.00
H Sherwin	66	32	0		
D Smith	66	43	0		
AF Skinner	36	34	0		
CS Elliott	24	14	0		
AE Alderman	17	24	0		
E Carrington	6	11	0		

== Wicket-keepers ==
- H Elliott 44 catches, 9 stumpings
- AE Alderman 17 catches, 1 stumping

== See also ==
- Derbyshire County Cricket Club seasons
- 1937 English cricket season
