= Derbyshire County Cricket Club in 1933 =

1933 season of an English cricket team

Derbyshire County Cricket Club seasons
1933 season
- Captain: A W Richardson
- County Championship: 6
- Most runs: Leslie Townsend
- Most wickets: Tommy Mitchell
- Most catches: Harry Elliott

Derbyshire County Cricket Club in 1933 was the cricket season when the English club Derbyshire had been playing for sixty two years. It was their thirty-fifth season in the County Championship and they won eleven matches to finish sixth.

== 1933 season ==
Derbyshire played 28 games in the County Championship, and one match against the touring West Indians. They won eleven of their games in the County Championship and lost eleven to come sixth. This was an advance on tenth place in the previous year and a further step on the road towards winning the championship in 1936. They drew with the West Indians.

A. W. Richardson was in his third season as captain in 1933. Leslie Townsend was top scorer. Tommy Mitchell took most wickets.

George Pope, the second of the three Pope brothers to play for the county, made his debut in the season. He was a useful all-rounder who added strength to the Derbyshire side for many years.

=== Matches ===
List of matches
No.	Date	V	Result	Margin	Notes
1	13 May 1933	Yorkshire; The Circle, Hull	Lost	6 wickets	Verity 6-12 and 6-41; L F Townsend 6-38
2	17 May 1933	Somerset; Rutland Recreation Ground, Ilkeston	Won	7 wickets	T. B. Mitchell 5-46; MacDonald-Watson 5-27; L F Townsend 5-59
3	20 May 1933	Kent; County Ground, Derby	Won	8 wickets	Ames 143; W H Copson 5-38; T. B. Mitchell 8-92
4	24 May 1933	Leicestershire; Queen's Park, Chesterfield	Won	Innings and 86 runs	GM Lee 107; T. B. Mitchell 6-40
5	27 May 1933	Hampshire; United Services Recreation Ground, Portsmouth	Drawn		Boyes 6-5; L F Townsend 7-35
6	31 May 1933	Essex; County Ground, Derby	Won	8 wickets	H Storer 232; Taylor 134; T. B. Mitchell 5-80
7	03 Jun 1933	Warwickshire; Edgbaston, Birmingham	Lost	8 wickets	Wyatt 166; Paine 5-38
8	07 Jun 1933	Worcestershire; County Ground, New Road, Worcester	Drawn		Walters 124; Perks 5-50
9	10 Jun 1933	Leicestershire; Park Road Ground, Loughborough	Won	Innings and 77 runs	Berry 111; L F Townsend 233; T. B. Mitchell 6-36
10	14 Jun 1933	West Indies; County Ground, Derby	Drawn		Headley 200
11	17 Jun 1933	Nottinghamshire; Trent Bridge, Nottingham	Lost	Innings and 121 runs	Carr 137; Staples 7-20
12	21 Jun 1933	Gloucestershire; Queen's Park, Chesterfield	Won	71 runs	Goddard 5-49 and 6-52; L F Townsend 6-64 and 8-26
13	24 Jun 1933	Somerset; Agricultural Showgrounds, Frome	Lost	89 runs	Ingle 103; T R Armstrong 7-57; Young 6-30
14	28 Jun 1933	Lancashire; Park Road Ground, Buxton	Lost	3 wickets	Sibbles 5-49; T. B. Mitchell 6-69
15	01 Jul 1933	Nottinghamshire; Rutland Recreation Ground, Ilkeston	Lost	57 runs	A Staples 113; T S Worthington 108; S Staples 6-103
16	05 Jul 1933	Essex; County Ground, Leyton	Drawn		L F Townsend 151; Nichols 135; T Smith 6-112
17	08 Jul 1933	Worcestershire; Queen's Park, Chesterfield	Won	Innings and 234 runs	T S Worthington 200*; T. B. Mitchell 5-20 and 6-44
18	15 Jul 1933	Sussex; County Ground, Derby	Lost	6 wickets	Parks 122; T. B. Mitchell 5-74; Langridge 5-63
19	22 Jul 1933	Northamptonshire; Queen's Park, Chesterfield	Won	157 runs	L F Townsend 99 and 106; Jupp 6–104; T R Armstrong 7-87
20	26 Jul 1933	Sussex; County Ground, Hove	Lost	169 runs	W H Copson 5-59; Cornford 5-26; A V Pope 7-84
21	29 Jul 1933	Middlesex; Queen's Park, Chesterfield	Lost	8 wickets	Sims 8-47; T. B. Mitchell 7-86; Hearne 9-61
22	05 Aug 1933	Warwickshire; County Ground, Derby	Won	317 runs	L F Townsend 172; Wyatt 102; Paine 5-115
23	09 Aug 1933	Kent; St Lawrence Ground, Canterbury	Lost	160 runs	Woolley 161; W H Copson 5-62; Freeman 6-30 and 6-82
24	12 Aug 1933	Yorkshire; Queen's Park, Chesterfield	Drawn		L F Townsend 100; T. B. Mitchell 6-66
25	16 Aug 1933	Gloucestershire; College Ground, Cheltenham	Lost	Innings and 85 runs	Hammond 231; W H Copson 7-62; Parker 7-93;
26	19 Aug 1933	Hampshire; Rutland Recreation Ground, Ilkeston	Drawn		Mead 227; Hill 5-23
27	23 Aug 1933	Middlesex; Lord's Cricket Ground, St John's Wood	Won	141 runs	Judge 5-27; W H Copson 5-28; T. B. Mitchell 5-62 and 6-53
28	26 Aug 1933	Northamptonshire; County Ground, Northampton	Won	Innings and 184 runs	GM Lee 128; L F Townsend 142; D Smith 129*
29	30 Aug 1933	Lancashire; Stanley Park, Blackpool	Drawn		Sibbles 5-62; T. B. Mitchell 8-38

== Statistics ==
=== County Championship batting averages ===
Name	Matches	Inns	Runs	High score	Average	100s
L F Townsend	27	49	1954	233	44.40	6
H Storer	15	26	1109	232	44.36	1
T S Worthington	27	47	1221	200*	29.78	2
A W Richardson	9	15	304	65*	27.63	0
A F Skinner	15	26	696	85	26.76	0
A E Alderman	21	38	930	83*	25.83	0
GR Jackson	5	8	206	96	25.75	0
GM Lee	25	44	979	128	23.30	2
D Smith	26	46	859	129*	20.45	1
A V Pope	24	38	697	72	19.36	0
H Elliott	28	44	651	94	19.14	0
TA Higson	4	8	146	51	18.25	0
GH Pope	2	3	44	32	14.66	0
LB Blaxland	8	14	193	64	13.78	0
C S Elliott	2	3	38	38	12.66	0
CC Clarke	7	11	137	31	12.45	0
T. B. Mitchell	25	35	245	37	11.13	0
W H Copson	26	33	172	43	6.61	0
T R Armstrong	12	20	62	18*	4.42	0

=== County Championship bowling averages ===
Name	Balls	Runs	Wickets	BB	Average
T. B. Mitchell	6711	2568	136	8-38	18.88
W H Copson	4908	1921	90	7-62	21.34
L F Townsend	4615	1472	87	8-26	16.91
T S Worthington	3076	1351	50	4-48	27.02
T R Armstrong	2106	832	32	7-57	26.00
A V Pope	2323	886	23	7-84	38.52
GM Lee	1158	527	13	2-30	40.53
A F Skinner	203	136	6	2-12	22.66
H Storer	420	232	4	1-14	58.00
C S Elliott	84	45	1	1-45	45.00
D Smith	31	24	0		
A E Alderman	6	7 0			

== Wicket Keeper ==
- Harry Elliott Catches 64 Stumping 17

== See also ==
- Derbyshire County Cricket Club seasons
- 1933 English cricket season
