= Derbyshire County Cricket Club in 1934 =

1934 season of an English cricket team

Derbyshire County Cricket Club seasons
1934 season
- Captain: A W Richardson
- County Championship: 3
- Most runs: Denis Smith
- Most wickets: Tommy Mitchell
- Most catches: Harry Elliott

Derbyshire County Cricket Club in 1934 was the cricket season when the English club Derbyshire had been playing for sixty-three years. It was their thirty-sixth season in the County Championship and they won ten matches in the County Championship, to finish third.

== 1934 season ==
Derbyshire played 28 matches in Championship, and one against the touring Australians. They won eleven matches altogether, ten in the County Championship to finish third in the table, on course to win the championship two years later in 1936. A W Richardson was in his fourth season as captain. Denis Smith scored most runs and Tommy Mitchell took most wickets.

Two players made their debut during the season. Elijah Carrington had been brought into the club in the previous year and played first team matches for three more years. Arnold Townsend played one game in 1934, but went on to become a significant player for the club.

=== Matches ===
List of matches
No.	Date	V	Result	Margin	Notes
1	5 May 1934	Lancashire; Rutland Recreation Ground, Ilkeston	Drawn		Watson 128; Iddon 121; Sibbles 6–44
2	12 May 1934	Sussex; County Ground, Hove	Lost	2 wickets	
3	19 May 1934	Warwickshire; County Ground, Derby	Won	2 wickets	
4	23 May 1934	Northamptonshire; County Ground, Northampton	Won	Innings and 147 runs	T S Worthington 147
5	26 May 1934	Yorkshire; Queen's Park, Chesterfield	Lost	102 runs	T. B. Mitchell 5–26 and 6–96; Bowes 5–60
6	2 Jun 1934	Nottinghamshire; Trent Bridge, Nottingham	Won	28 runs	T R Armstrong 5–72; Voce 7–53; L F Townsend 7–47
7	6 Jun 1934	Surrey; Kennington Oval	Lost	7 wickets	Gregory 124; D Smith 126; Gover 6–37; T S Worthington 6–90
8	9 Jun 1934	Hampshire; United Services Recreation Ground, Portsmouth	Lost	Innings and 82 runs	Arnold 144; Mead 138; A E Alderman 124
9	13 Jun 1934	Gloucestershire; County Ground, Derby	Drawn		Hammond 134; T. B. Mitchell 5–119;
10	16 Jun 1934	Leicestershire; Aylestone Road, Leicester	Won	124 runs	T. B. Mitchell 7–55
11	20 Jun 1934	Kent; Queen's Park, Chesterfield	Drawn		Freeman 6–105; T. B. Mitchell 5–114
12	23 Jun 1934	Northamptonshire; County Ground, Derby	Drawn		A E Alderman 115; Timms 100; T. B. Mitchell 6–73
13	27 Jun 1934	Sussex; Park Road Ground, Buxton	Drawn		Parks 138; D Smith 120
14	30 Jun 1934	Somerset; Queen's Park, Chesterfield	Won	10 wickets	H Storer 113
15	4 Jul 1934	Kent; Nevill Ground, Tunbridge Wells	Won	4 wickets	W H Copson 5–36; Freeman 5–29
16	7 Jul 1934	Worcestershire; Amblecote, Stourbridge	Won	Innings and 115 runs	T. B. Mitchell 8–22 and 5–66; L F Townsend 5–48
17	11 Jul 1934	Australian cricket team in England in 1934; Queen's Park, Chesterfield	Lost	9 wickets	Ebeling 5–28; T. B. Mitchell 7–105; Fleetwood-Smith 5–38
18	14 Jul 1934	Middlesex; County Ground, Derby	Won	278 runs	T. B. Mitchell 6–56 and 7–57
19	18 Jul 1934	Gloucestershire; Wagon Works Ground, Gloucester	Drawn		Dacre 117; D Smith 131; A F Skinner 102; Goddard 5–90; Sinfield 5–54
20	21 Jul 1934	Worcestershire; Queen's Park, Chesterfield	Drawn		Gibbons 105
21	25 Jul 1934	Surrey; Rutland Recreation Ground, Ilkeston	Drawn		D Smith 125
22	28 Jul 1934	Hampshire; County Ground, Derby	Won	10 wickets	T S Worthington 154; T. B. Mitchell 6–90
23	1 Aug 1934	Yorkshire; Bramall Lane, Sheffield	Drawn		T. B. Mitchell 5–81
24	4 Aug 1934	Warwickshire; Edgbaston, Birmingham	Drawn		Paine 6–88
25	8 Aug 1934	Lancashire; Old Trafford, Manchester	Lost	135 runs	Hopwood 5–32 and 8–58
26	11 Aug 1934	Somerset; Clarence Park, Weston-super-Mare	Won	Innings and 69 runs	L F Townsend 106 and 6–66 and 5–64
27	15 Aug 1934	Middlesex; Lord's Cricket Ground, St John's Wood	Lost	84 runs	C Smith 5–51; W H Copson 5–63; SIms 6–85
28	18 Aug 1934	Nottinghamshire; Rutland Recreation Ground, Ilkeston	Won	201 runs	A V Pope 6–21; Voce 6–52; W H Copson 5–40
29	29 Aug 1934	Leicestershire; Queen's Park, Chesterfield	Won	42 runs	

== Statistics ==
=== County Championship batting averages ===
Name	Matches	Inns	Runs	High score	Average	100s
H Storer	15	25	881	113	38.30	1
D Smith	28	47	1565	131	35.56	4
A E Alderman	26	44	1290	124*	33.94	2
GR Jackson	2	4	125	93	31.25	0
A F Skinner	20	33	921	102	29.70	1
L F Townsend	28	46	1149	106*	27.35	1
T S Worthington	28	44	1185	154	26.93	2
LB Blaxland	2	3	67	31	22.33	0
H Elliott	28	42	661	72*	21.32	0
E Carrington	11	16	311	80	20.73	0
A V Pope	26	40	603	40	17.73	0
NM Ford	5	8	129	60	16.12	0
A W Richardson	15	25	319	58	13.86	0
G H Pope	10	15	168	25	12.92	0
C S Elliott	8	13	165	45	12.69	0
T R Armstrong	12	16	100	28*	11.11	0
A F Townsend	1	2	7	7*	7.00	0
W H Copson	21	27	104	18	5.77	0
T. B. Mitchell	21	29	131	28	5.24	0
JD Southern	1	2	1	1	0.50	0

=== County Championship bowling averages ===
Name	Balls	Runs	Wickets	BB	Average
T. B. Mitchell	4827	2400	138	8–22	17.39
W H Copson	4088	1603	91	5–36	17.61
L F Townsend	4190	1624	75	7–47	21.65
T S Worthington	4095	1641	59	6–90	27.81
A V Pope	2919	1022	51	6–21	20.03
T R Armstrong	1636	701	18	5–72	38.94
G H Pope	876	391	17	4–107	23.00
C S Elliott	84	40	0		
A F Skinner	72	62	0		
H Storer	70	51	0		
D Smith	42	32	0		
A E Alderman	12	12	0		
NM Ford	6	1	0		

== Wicket-keeper ==
Harry Elliott Catches 58, Stumping 18

== See also ==
- Derbyshire County Cricket Club seasons
- 1934 English cricket season
