= Derbyshire County Cricket Club in 1939 =

1939 season of an English cricket team

Derbyshire County Cricket Club seasons
1939 season
- Captain: Robin Buckston
- County Championship: 9
- Most runs: Denis Smith
- Most wickets: Bill Copson
- Most catches: Harry Elliott

Derbyshire County Cricket Club in 1939 was the last cricket season before World War II, when the English club Derbyshire had been playing for sixty-eight years. It was their forty first season in the County Championship and they won ten matches in the Championship, to finish ninth.

== 1939 season ==
Derbyshire played 28 matches in the County Championship, one against Oxford University and one against the touring West Indians. They won eleven matches altogether, ten in the County Championship. Robin Buckston was in his third season as captain. Denis Smith scored most runs and Bill Copson took most wickets.

Nearly all the players had been members of the 1936 championship winning team and the only player to make his debut was Cliff Gladwin whose low scores and failure to take a wicket gave little inkling that he would turn out to be Derbyshire's main wicket-taker in the years after World War II.

=== Matches ===
List of matches
No.	Date	V	Result	Margin	Notes
1	10 May 1939	Oxford University; The University Parks, Oxford	Won	163 runs	W H Copson 5-12 and 5-9; Pether 5-7; A V Pope 5-30
2	13 May 1939	Surrey; Queen's Park, Chesterfield	Drawn		Gregory 5-46; W H Copson 5-47
3	20 May 1939	Northamptonshire; County Ground, Derby	Won	10 wickets	
4	27 May 1939	Warwickshire; Edgbaston, Birmingham	Lost	71 runs	Dollery 177; W H Copson 5-47; Hollies 6-48 and 5-79; T. B. Mitchell 5-112
5	31 May 1939	Kent; Rutland Recreation Ground, Ilkeston	Won	5 wickets	W H Copson 5-39;
6	03 Jun 1939	Lancashire; Old Trafford, Manchester	Lost	Innings and 105 runs	Paynter 222; Phillipson 5-38
7	07 Jun 1939	Worcestershire; Queen's Park, Chesterfield	Won	315 runs	D Smith 123; A V Pope6-47
8	10 Jun 1939	West Indies; County Ground, Derby	Drawn		W H Copson 6-73
9	14 Jun 1939	Surrey; Woodbridge Road, Guildford	Won	Innings and 43 runs	Parker 6-34; A V Pope 6-44; G H Pope 5-46
10	17 Jun 1939	Lancashire; Park Road Ground, Buxton	Drawn		T S Worthington 101
11	21 Jun 1939	Leicestershire; Queen's Park, Chesterfield	Won	9 wickets	H Smith 5-64; L F Townsend 5-45
12	24 Jun 1939	Yorkshire; Bramall Lane, Sheffield	Lost	276 runs	Barber 100; G H Pope 6-44; Smurthwaite 5-7; Smailes 10-47
13	28 Jun 1939	Sussex; County Ground, Derby	Lost	13 runs	T S Worthington 119; W H Copson 6-64; Duffield 5-38; Langridge 3-5; Langridge scored a hat-trick
14	01 Jul 1939	Essex; Queen's Park, Chesterfield	Won	10 wickets	W H Copson 6-57; Stephenson 6-41
15	08 Jul 1939	Nottinghamshire; Trent Bridge, Nottingham	Drawn		T. B. Mitchell 5-70
16	12 Jul 1939	Middlesex; County Ground, Derby	Won	6 wickets	W H Copson 7-39
17	15 Jul 1939	Yorkshire; Queen's Park, Chesterfield	Drawn		
18	19 Jul 1939	Worcestershire; Tipton Road, Dudley	Drawn		D Smith 132
19	22 Jul 1939	Somerset; County Ground, Derby	Drawn		Buse 5-76; G H Pope 5-59; T. B. Mitchell 5-66; Andrews 5-45
20	26 Jul 1939	Middlesex; Lord's Cricket Ground, St John's Wood	Lost	Innings and 24 runs	Denis Compton 214; Sims 8-32 and 5-128
21	29 Jul 1939	Kent; Bat and Ball Ground, Gravesend	Lost	171 runs	Ames 159; Todd 106; Harding 5-56
22	02 Aug 1939	Gloucestershire; Queen's Park, Chesterfield	Drawn		Scott 7-63; T. B. Mitchell 6-71
23	05 Aug 1939	Warwickshire; Ind Coope Ground, Burton-on-Trent	Drawn		Grove 5-78
24	09 Aug 1939	Northamptonshire; County Ground, Northampton	Drawn		Brookes 101; G H Pope 6-38
25	12 Aug 1939	Essex; Southchurch Park, Southend-on-Sea	Lost	Innings and 31 runs	Nichols 6-18 and 5-26; Farnes 5-52
26	16 Aug 1939	Gloucestershire; College Ground, Cheltenham	Won	1 run	W H Copson 5-45;A V Pope 5-25; Lambert 6-69; T. B. Mitchell 5-75
27	19 Aug 1939	Nottinghamshire; Rutland Recreation Ground, Ilkeston	Won	147 runs	G H Pope 121
28	23 Aug 1939	Sussex; The Saffrons, Eastbourne	Lost	Innings and 39 runs	T. B. Mitchell 8-149 Nye 5-49
29	26 Aug 1939	Somerset; County Ground, Taunton	Won	7 wickets	A F Townsend 142; Buse 8-41
30	30 Aug 1939	Leicestershire; Aylestone Road, Leicester	Drawn		Sperry 7-48; W H Copson 6-39

== Statistics ==
=== County Championship batting averages ===
Name	Matches	Inns	Runs	High score	Average	100s
G H Pope	28	46	1397	121	34.07	1
D Smith	28	51	1468	132	31.91	2
T S Worthington	24	40	1036	119	28.77	2
A E Alderman	28	48	1138	91	25.86	0
A V Pope	28	41	768	65	21.94	
A F Townsend	11	21	400	142*	21.05	1
L F Townsend	22	33	647	92	20.87	0
AEG Rhodes	26	39	468	72	12.64	0
TD Hounsfield	13	19	179	36	11.18	0
RHR Buckston	17	27	236	33	10.26	0
T R Armstrong	2	10	8*	10.00	0	
H Elliott	25	36	244	25	9.76	0
W H Copson	26	34	206	26	7.92	0
C Gladwin	4	7	53	16	7.57	0
T. B. Mitchell	26	35	172	27	6.14	0

=== County Championship bowling averages ===
Name	Balls	Runs	Wickets	BB	Average
W H Copson	4404	1856	109	7-39	17.02
A V Pope	4301	1734	86	6-44	20.16
T. B. Mitchell	2744	1728	80	8-149	21.60
G H Pope	3332	1474	78	6-38	18.89
AEG Rhodes	976	477	25	3-14	19.08
L F Townsend	580	245	8	5-45	30.62
D Smith	24	10	1	1-10	10.00
T R Armstrong	88	54	0		
C Gladwin	144	78	0		

== Wicket Keeper ==
- Harry Elliott Catches 48, Stumping 11
- Albert Alderman Catches 17, Stumping 1

== See also ==
- Derbyshire County Cricket Club seasons
- 1939 English cricket season
