= Derbyshire County Cricket Club in 1938 =

1938 season of an English cricket team

Derbyshire County Cricket Club seasons
1938 season
- Captain: Robin Buckston
- County Championship: 5
- Most runs: Stan Worthington
- Most wickets: Tommy Mitchell
- Most catches: Harry Elliott

Derbyshire County Cricket Club in 1938 was the cricket season when the English club Derbyshire had been playing for 67 years. It was their fortieth season in the County Championship and they came fifth.

== 1938 season ==
Derbyshire played 28 games in the County Championship, and one match against the touring Australians. In the County Championship, they won eleven matches and lost eight to finish fifth, a drop of two places from the previous season. They also suffered a heavy defeat by the Australians.

Robin Buckston was in his second season as captain. Stan Worthington was top scorer, closely followed by Leslie Townsend. Tommy Mitchell took most wickets.

Thomas Hounsfield made his debut for the club in 1938 and went on to play one more season before World War II led to the suspension of the first class game..

=== Matches ===
List of matches
| No. | Date | V | Result | Margin | Notes |
|---|---|---|---|---|---|
| 1 | 7 May 1938 | Gloucestershire; Ashley Down Ground, Bristol | Lost | 139 runs | Hammond 237; A E Alderman 150; Sinfield 7–98 and 5–51 |
| 2 | 11 May 1938 | Lancashire; Aigburth, Liverpool | Won | 216 runs | Nutter 5–72; W H Copson 5–54; G H Pope 5–76 and 5–18 |
| 3 | 14 May 1938 | Surrey; Queen's Park, Chesterfield | Won | 112 runs | T. B. Mitchell 7–45; L F Townsend 7–57 |
| 4 | 18 May 1938 | Surrey; Kennington Oval | Lost | 68 runs | Brown 6–44 and 5–91; AEG Rhodes 5–50 |
| 5 | 21 May 1938 | Somerset; County Ground, Derby | Won | 8 wickets | Buse 104; G H Pope 5–41; Wellard 5–101 |
| 6 | 25 May 1938 | Lancashire; Rutland Recreation Ground, Ilkeston | Lost | 9 wickets | D Smith 110; Pollard 7–53 |
| 7 | 28 May 1938 | Sussex; Queen's Park, Chesterfield | Abandoned | | |
| 8 | 4 Jun 1938 | Warwickshire; County Ground, Derby | Lost | 4 wickets | AEG Rhodes 107*; Dollery 134; Buckingham 124; W H Copson 5–51 |
| 9 | 8 Jun 1938 | Northamptonshire; County Ground, Northampton | Won | 94 runs | L F Townsend 103; James 105*; Robinson 5–37; W H Copson 5–26 |
| 10 | 11 Jun 1938 | Kent; Angel Ground, Tonbridge | Won | Innings and 86 runs | D Smith 122; A V Pope 5–68; G H Pope 7–57 |
| 11 | 15 Jun 1938 | Hampshire; United Services Recreation Ground, Portsmouth | Lost | 37 runs | T S Worthington 121 |
| 12 | 18 Jun 1938 | Gloucestershire; Ind Coope Ground, Burton-on-Trent | Drawn | | Hammond 110 and 123; D Smith 113; W H Copson 5–75; Sinfield 5–113; T. B. Mitchell 6–102 |
| 13 | 25 Jun 1938 | Northamptonshire; County Ground, Derby | Drawn | | T. B. Mitchell 6–15 |
| 14 | 29 Jun 1938 | Australians; Queen's Park, Chesterfield | Lost | Innings and 234 runs | Brown 265; Ward 5–45; Waite 5–40 |
| 15 | 2 Jul 1938 | Kent; Park Road Ground, Buxton | Drawn | | T. B. Mitchell 5–56; Wright 6–32 |
| 16 | 6 Jul 1938 | Essex; Queen's Park, Chesterfield | Drawn | | AEG Rhodes 5–25 |
| 17 | 9 Jul 1938 | Yorkshire; Queen's Park, Chesterfield | Lost | 163 runs | G H Pope 6–37 |
| 18 | 13 Jul 1938 | Worcestershire; Amblecote, Stourbridge | Drawn | | T. B. Mitchell 5–75 |
| 19 | 16 Jul 1938 | Leicestershire; County Ground, Derby | Drawn | | H Smith 5–48 |
| 20 | 23 Jul 1938 | Nottinghamshire; Rutland Recreation Ground, Ilkeston | Won | 9 wickets | Harris 115; Voce 111; T S Worthington 103 and 110; T. B. Mitchell 6–111; W H Copson 7–59 |
| 21 | 30 Jul 1938 | Warwickshire; Edgbaston, Birmingham | Won | Innings and 28 runs | Dollery 113; A V Pope 103; W H Copson 6–36 |
| 22 | 3 Aug 1938 | Somerset; Clarence Park, Weston-super-Mare | Drawn | | Lee 162; T. B. Mitchell 6–137 |
| 23 | 6 Aug 1938 | Yorkshire; Bramall Lane, Sheffield | Lost | 210 runs | Smailes 5–39; T S Worthington 5–44 |
| 24 | 10 Aug 1938 | Worcestershire; County Ground, Derby | Won | | A V Pope 5–47; W H Copson 6–38 |
| 25 | 13 Aug 1938 | Nottinghamshire; Trent Bridge, Nottingham | Won | 102 runs | T S Worthington 108; Hardstaff 134; Voce 5–42; W H Copson 5–65 |
| 26 | 17 Aug 1938 | Hampshire; Queen's Park, Chesterfield | Won | 10 wickets | G H Pope 7–53; T. B. Mitchell 6–96 |
| 27 | 20 Aug 1938 | Sussex; The Saffrons, Eastbourne | Drawn | | Langridge 114; A E Alderman 125; L F Townsend 167; A V Pope 6–48 |
| 28 | 24 Aug 1938 | Essex; Vista Road Recreation Ground, Clacton-on-Sea | Lost | 6 wickets | T. B. Mitchell 7–51; T Smith 5–55 |
| 29 | 27 Aug 1938 | Leicestershire; Bath Grounds, Ashby-de-la-Zouch | Won | Innings and 49 runs | T S Worthington 106; H Smith 5–75; T. B. Mitchell 5–44 and 5–45 |

== Statistics ==
=== County Championship batting averages ===
| Name | Matches | Inns | Runs | High score | Average | 100s |
|---|---|---|---|---|---|---|
| T S Worthington | 24 | 37 | 1454 | 121 | 41.54 | 5 |
| L F Townsend | 27 | 42 | 1453 | 167* | 40.36 | 2 |
| A E Alderman | 27 | 45 | 1251 | 150 | 30.51 | 2 |
| D Smith | 25 | 41 | 1173 | 122 | 29.32 | 3 |
| G H Pope | 26 | 39 | 903 | 85 | 29.12 | 0 |
| AEG Rhodes | 24 | 35 | 898 | 107* | 28.96 | 1 |
| A F Skinner | 4 | 5 | 132 | 65 | 26.40 | 0 |
| A V Pope | 26 | 36 | 688 | 103 | 22.19 | 1 |
| A F Townsend | 10 | 15 | 225 | 68* | 17.30 | 0 |
| H Elliott | 27 | 36 | 437 | 50* | 14.56 | 0 |
| RHR Buckston | 25 | 31 | 268 | 60* | 10.72 | 0 |
| TD Hounsfield | 2 | 3 | 32 | 18 | 10.66 | 0 |
| T. B. Mitchell | 27 | 35 | 243 | 23 | 8.67 | 0 |
| W H Copson | 23 | 27 | 68 | 12 | 3.40 | 0 |

=== County Championship bowling averages ===
| Name | Balls | Runs | Wickets | BB | Average |
|---|---|---|---|---|---|
| T. B. Mitchell | 4230 | 2525 | 130 | 7–45 | 19.42 |
| W H Copson | 4270 | 1880 | 101 | 7–59 | 18.61 |
| G H Pope | 4331 | 2005 | 91 | 7–53 | 22.03 |
| A V Pope | 4604 | 1849 | 78 | 6–48 | 23.70 |
| L F Townsend | 1229 | 522 | 20 | 7–57 | 26.10 |
| AEG Rhodes | 1034 | 540 | 18 | 5–25 | 30.00 |
| T S Worthington | 300 | 146 | 7 | 5–44 | 20.85 |
| D Smith | 52 | 32 | 1 | 1–17 | 32.00 |
| A E Alderman | 6 | 0 | 0 | | |
| RHR Buckston | 6 | 10 | 0 | | |

== Wicket-keeper ==
- H Elliott Catches 52 Stumping 10

== See also ==
- Derbyshire County Cricket Club seasons
- 1938 English cricket season
