= Derbyshire County Cricket Club in 1947 =

1947 season of an English cricket team

Derbyshire County Cricket Club seasons
1947 season
- Captain: Edward Gothard
- County Championship: 5
- Most runs: Charlie Elliott
- Most wickets: Cliff Gladwin
- Most catches: Denis Smith

Derbyshire County Cricket Club in 1947 represents the cricket season when the English club Derbyshire had been playing for seventy-six years. It was their forty-third season in the County Championship and they won twelve matches and lost ten to finish fifth in the County Championship.

== 1947 season ==
Derbyshire played 26 matches in the County Championship and two against touring sides from Ireland and South Africa. They won eleven matches in the Championship and won the game against Ireland.

Edward Gothard was brought into the side as captain in 1947 and the club saw a marked improvement in rating. Charlie Elliott was top scorer and Cliff Gladwin and George Pope equalled on wickets taken in the County Championship at 102, but Gladwin took most overall with 117. Derbyshire struggled with the wicket-keeping. Denis Smith was wicket-keeper for much of the season, but Harry Elliott was brought back for a four match spell before George Dawkes joined for the last few matches of the season. Charlie Elliott and Alderman also took spells behind the stumps.

Apart from Gothard, debuting as captain three important players to join the club were HL Jackson, George Dawkes and David Skinner. Jackson had a long career and was one of the club's leading bowlers. Dawkes came in as wicket-keeper for the last four matches of the season and remained as Derbyshire's wicket-keeper for many seasons. Skinner had a shorter career but was captain after Gothard. DC Brooke-Taylor also joined the side as stand-in captain in his first game and played for three seasons. Richard Watson played just 6 matches for Derbyshire which were all in the 1947 season.

=== Matches ===
List of matches
No.	Date	V	Result	Margin	Notes
1	10 May 1947	Kent; St Lawrence Ground, Canterbury	Lost	100 runs	Ames 104; C Gladwin 5-60; Wright 6-67
2	17 May 1947	Worcestershire; Queen's Park, Chesterfield	Won	2 wickets	C Gladwin 5-82 and 5-33; Perks 5-84, P Jackson 5-72
3	24 May 1947	Warwickshire; Edgbaston, Birmingham	Won	100 runs	W H Copson 5-39; Grove 6-44
4	31 May 1947	Northamptonshire; County Ground, Derby	Won	Innings and 25 runs	T S Worthington 104; Clarke 5-51
5	04 Jun 1947	Glamorgan; St Helen's, Swansea	Drawn		Muncer 5-41
6	07 Jun 1947	Hampshire; United Services Recreation Ground, Portsmouth	Lost	7 wickets	McCorkell 103; Heath 7-49 and 6-103; G H Pope 6-61
7	11 Jun 1947	Somerset; Queen's Park, Chesterfield	Won	Inningsand 125 runs	G H Pope 6-34 and 7-16; Hazell 5-64
8	14 Jun 1947	Sussex; Cricket Field Road Ground, Horsham	Won	99 runs	G H Pope 5-63
9	18 Jun 1947	Leicestershire; Rutland Recreation Ground, Ilkeston	Won	Innings and 105 runs	T S Worthington 130; G H Pope 6-30; W H Copson 5-21
10	21 Jun 1947	Lancashire; Park Road Ground, Buxton	Lost	3 runs	AC Revill 102; C Gladwin 9-119 and 5-40; W H Copson 5-25
11	25 Jun 1947	Ireland; Park Road Ground, Buxton	Won	Innings and 8 runs	AEG Rhodes 5-55
12	28 Jun 1947	Glamorgan; County Ground, Derby	Won	4 wickets	C Gladwin 5-57; Wooller 5-60
13	02 Jul 1947	Gloucestershire; Ashley Down Ground, Bristol	Lost	2 wickets	Cook 5-60
14	05 Jul 1947	Kent; Abbeydale Park, Sheffield	Drawn		AEG Rhodes 5-83
15	09 Jul 1947	Surrey; Queen's Park, Chesterfield	Abandoned		
16	12 Jul 1947	Lancashire; Old Trafford, Manchester	Lost	Innings and 93 runs	Price 6-63; Cranston 5-47
17	16 Jul 1947	South Africa; County Ground, Derby	Lost	3 wickets	Smith 7-65 and 6-1; G H Pope 5-60 and 5-36
18	19 Jul 1947	Nottinghamshire; Rutland Recreation Ground, Ilkeston	Won	15 runs	Butler 6-38 and 5-79; G H Pope 6-20 and 6-81
19	23 Jul 1947	Surrey; Kennington Oval >	Lost	193 runs	Parker 204; A F Townsend 103; Bedser 6-66 and 5-36
20	26 Jul 1947	Northamptonshire; Town Ground, Rushden	Won	7 wickets	FE Marsh 6-37; Broderick 8-16; C Gladwin 8-26
21	30 Jul 1947	Leicestershire; Grace Road, Leicester	Lost	3 wickets	JD Eggar 105; G H Pope 115; V Jackson 120; AEG Rhodes 6-73
22	02 Aug 1947	Warwickshire; County Ground, Derby	Drawn		Ord 111; G H Pope 6-82
23	06 Aug 1947	Essex; Queen's Park, Chesterfield	Lost	5 wickets	Vigar 114; T Smith 163; Bailey 5-83 and 5-92
24	09 Aug 1947	Nottinghamshire; Trent Bridge, Nottingham	Drawn		CS Elliott 215; JD Eggar 173; Winrow 204; Harvey 125
25	13 Aug 1947	Yorkshire; North Marine Road Ground, Scarborough	Drawn		A F Townsend 137; Lester 127; Yardley 177 AEG Rhodes 8-162
26	16 Aug 1947	Hampshire; Queen's Park, Chesterfield	Won	68 runs	Bailey 7-82; Hill 5-62; G H Pope 6-49
27	20 Aug 1947	Middlesex; County Ground, Derby	Lost	212 runs	Brown 150; Compton 107; Young 6-28 Gothard scored hat-trick
28	23 Aug 1947	Worcestershire; County Ground, New Road, Worcester	Won	10 wickets	W H Copson 5-15; Howorth 5-88

== Statistics ==
=== County Championship batting averages ===
Name	Matches	Inns	Runs	High score	Average	100s
JD Eggar	6	9	444	173	49.33	2
D Smith	19	31	952	79	36.61	0
CS Elliott	23	40	1337	215	33.42	1
T S Worthington	15	25	705	130	32.04	2
DC Brooke-Taylor	3	6	155	61*	31.00	0
A F Townsend	24	43	1249	137	30.46	2
G H Pope	19	29	684	115*	24.42	1
P Vaulkhard	6	8	184	84	23.00	0
GO Dawkes	4	6	105	49	21.00	0
A E Alderman	22	38	721	71	20.02	0
FE Marsh	19	32	476	63	19.04	0
AEG Rhodes	25	39	627	61	18.44	0
AC Revill	23	38	655	102	18.19	1
C Gladwin	20	30	433	52	18.04	0
EJ Gothard	20	28	216	40	11.36	0
W H Copson	17	25	191	38*	9.09	0
H Elliott	4	6	32	13	8.00	0
RM Watson	4	8	34	18*	5.66	0
David Skinner	1	1	1	1	1.00	0
HL Jackson	1	2	0	0	0.00	0

=== County Championship bowling averages ===
Name	Balls	Runs	Wickets	BB	Average
G H Pope	4191	1904	102	7-16	18.66
C Gladwin	4293	1807	102	9-119	17.71
W H Copson	3741	1617	81	5-15	19.96
AEG Rhodes	3528	1943	73	8-162	26.61
FE Marsh	1156	536	22	6-37	24.36
T S Worthington	1261	717	14	3-23	51.21
AC Revill	602	374	10	2-9	37.40
EJ Gothard	408	244	6	3-84	40.66
HL Jackson	78	46	1	1-40	46.00
JD Eggar	96	57	0		

== Wicket Keepers ==
- Denis Smith Catches 30, Stumping 0
- CS Elliott Catches 22, Stumping 1
- H Elliott Catches 7, Stumping 1
- GO Dawkes Catches 3, Stumping 0

== See also ==
- Derbyshire County Cricket Club seasons
- 1947 English cricket season
