= Derbyshire County Cricket Club in 1935 =

English cricket team season

Derbyshire County Cricket Club seasons
1935 season
- Captain: A W Richardson
- County Championship: 2
- Most runs: Denis Smith
- Most wickets: Tommy Mitchell
- Most catches: Harry Elliott

Derbyshire County Cricket Club in 1935 was the cricket season when the English club Derbyshire were runners up in the County Championship for the first time, as a prelude to winning the Championship in the 1936 season. They had been playing for sixty four years and it was their thirty-seventh season in the County Championship.

== 1935 season ==
A. W. Richardson became captain in the 1931 season, and building on foundations of his predecessors forged a team that were runners up in 1935 before going on to take the Championship in the 1936 season. Their record was in fact better in 1935 than in their championship year.

Derbyshire played 28 games in the County Championship, and one match against the touring South Africans. Denis Smith was top scorer in the County Championships. Tommy Mitchell took 160 wickets in the championship and a further eight to make him top bowler and set a lasting record of most wickets in a season. Against Leicestershire in 1935 he took all ten for 64 in an innings.

Denis Smith also played for England in two Test matches against the South Africans and was Wisden Cricketer of the Year..

Gilbert Hodgkinson, future captain made his debut in the season.

=== Matches ===
List of matches
No.	Date	V	Result	Margin	Notes
1	11 May 1935	Yorkshire; Queen's Park, Chesterfield	Drawn		D Smith 189; A E Alderman 100; Hedley Verity 5-118 and 5-74
2	15 May 1935	Surrey; Kennington Oval	Won	9 wickets	T. B. Mitchell 8-78
3	18 May 1935	Leicestershire; County Ground, Derby	Won	10 wickets	W H Copson 5-37
4	25 May 1935	Essex; Old County Ground, Brentwood	Won	4 wickets	W H Copson 5-28; T. B. Mitchell 5-56; Eastman 5-36 and 6-60
5	29 May 1935	South Africans; Rutland Recreation Ground, Ilkeston	Lost	209 runs	Viljoen 153; Cameron 132; T. B. Mitchell 5-167
6	01 Jun 1935	Hampshire; Queen's Park, Chesterfield	Won	Innings and 104 runs	D Smith 225
7	05 Jun 1935	Worcestershire; County Ground, New Road, Worcester	Lost	9 wickets	Howorth 6-16
8	08 Jun 1935	Warwickshire; Edgbaston, Birmingham	Lost	6 wickets	Wyatt 5-30
9	15 Jun 1935	Leicestershire; Aylestone Road, Leicester	Drawn		H Smith 5-51; Geary 5-46; T. B. Mitchell 10-64; Marlow 5-69
10	19 Jun 1935	Somerset; County Ground, Derby	Won	114 runs	W H Copson 5-15; Derbyshire played one ball in their second innings before declaring
11	26 Jun 1935	Lancashire; Old Trafford, Manchester	Won	7 runs	Booth 5-54
12	29 Jun 1935	Nottinghamshire; Rutland Recreation Ground, Ilkeston	Won	7 wickets	T S Worthington 126; Voce 5-87
13	03 Jul 1935	Surrey; Queen's Park, Chesterfield	Drawn		Holmes 206; T S Worthington 107; Watts 6-74; A V Pope 5-34
14	06 Jul 1935	Lancashire; Park Road Ground, Buxton	Drawn		T R Armstrong 5-13; L F Townsend 5-35
15	10 Jul 1935	Gloucestershire; Ashley Down Ground, Bristol	Lost	68 runs	T. B. Mitchell 6-126; Goddard 6-62; A V Pope 5-48
16	13 Jul 1935	Nottinghamshire; Trent Bridge, Nottingham	Lost	3 wickets	Gunn 113
17	17 Jul 1935	Kent; Queen's Park, Chesterfield	Won	Innings and 75 runs	A V Pope 5-37; Todd 6-94; T. B. Mitchell 7-66
18	20 Jul 1935	Gloucestershire; The Town Ground, Burton-on-Trent	Won	10 wickets	W H Copson 5-31
19	24 Jul 1935	Sussex; Queen's Park, Chesterfield	Lost	7 wickets	Parks 119
20	27 Jul 1935	Northamptonshire; Queen's Park, Chesterfield	Won	10 wickets	T. B. Mitchell 8-67; L F Townsend 5-21
21	31 Jul 1935	Sussex; County Ground, Hove	Won	5 wickets	Langridge 106; Cornford 7-76; W H Copson 6-42
22	03 Aug 1935	Warwickshire; County Ground, Derby	Won	77 runs	L F Townsend 103; Santall 113; Hollies 6-75; T. B. Mitchell 5-63
23	07 Aug 1935	Northamptonshire; County Ground, Northampton	Won	100 runs	L F Townsend 102; Clark 5-33; T. B. Mitchell 7-73; W H Copson 5-44
24	10 Aug 1935	Essex; Queen's Park, Chesterfield	Won	21 runs	T. B. Mitchell 7-97; Nichols 8-58
25	14 Aug 1935	Yorkshire; North Marine Road Ground, Scarborough	Lost	10 wickets	
26	17 Aug 1935	Worcestershire; County Ground, Derby	Drawn		L F Townsend 180
27	21 Aug 1935	Kent; Crabble Athletic Ground, Dover	Drawn		G H Pope 5-126
28	24 Aug 1935	Hampshire; Dean Park, Bournemouth	Won	80 runs	A V Pope 5-35 and 5-41
29	28 Aug 1935	Somerset; County Ground, Taunton	Won	41 runs	T. B. Mitchell 5-58; White 8-36

== Statistics ==
=== County Championship batting averages ===
Name	Matches	Inns	Runs	High score	Average	100s
D Smith	23	45	1697	225	42.42	2
A F Skinner	10	18	550	81	36.66	0
L F Townsend	27	47	1560	180	35.45	3
T S Worthington	24	40	1276	126	33.57	2
H Storer	13	24	635	79	27.60	0
A E Alderman	28	50	1134	100	24.65	1
E Carrington	23	36	812	74	23.88	0
C S Elliott	2	4	90	52	22.50	0
G H Pope	23	38	685	67	21.40	0
A W Richardson	21	34	549	59	17.70	0
LB Blaxland	3	5	83	28	16.60	0
H Elliott	28	41	432	46	15.42	0
A F Townsend	6	8	108	47	15.42	0
A V Pope	27	42	490	62	13.61	0
W H Copson	18	23	134	22*	9.57	0
GR Jackson	2	3	22	15	7.33	0
T. B. Mitchell	25	37	169	29	6.03	0
WWH Hill-Wood	2	4	10	4	3.33	0
T R Armstrong	1	1	2	2	2.00	0
GF Hodgkinson	2	3	5	5	1.66	0 0 0

In addition Thomas Higson played in the match against the South Africans.

=== County Championship bowling averages ===
Name	Balls	Runs	Wickets	BB	Average
T. B. Mitchell	4883	3059	160	10-64	19.11
A V Pope	4560	1639	85	5-34	19.28
W H Copson	3000	1174	71	6-42	16.53
L F Townsend	3947	1398	62	5-21	22.54
G H Pope	2769	1217	62	5-126	19.62
T S Worthington	1766	871	23	3-19	37.86
T R Armstrong	389	58	6	5-13	9.66
D Smith	132	68	1	1-48	68.00
LB Blaxland	18	1	0		
E Carrington	36	21	0		
H Elliott	3	5	0		
W W H Hill-Wood	72	63	0		
H Storer	24	11	0		
A E Alderman	66	30	0		
A F Townsend	6	7	0		

== Wicket Keeper ==
H Elliott Catches 66 Stumping 22

== See also ==
- Derbyshire County Cricket Club seasons
- 1935 English cricket season
