= Derbyshire County Cricket Club in 1932 =

1932 season of an English cricket team

Derbyshire County Cricket Club seasons
1932 season
- Captain: A W Richardson
- County Championship: 10
- Most runs: Denis Smith
- Most wickets: Tommy Mitchell
- Most catches: Harry Elliott

Derbyshire County Cricket Club in 1932 represents the cricket season when the English club Derbyshire had been playing for sixty one years. It was their thirty-fourth season in the County Championship and they won six matches to finish tenth

== 1932 season ==
Derbyshire played 28 games in the County Championship, and one match against the touring Indians on their first visit to England. Derbyshire won seven matches including the one against the tourists, but the season was marked by a number of draws and two abandoned matches.

A. W. Richardson was in his second season as captain in 1932. Denis Smith was top scorer with three centuries. Tommy Mitchell took most wickets. In the match against Essex at Chesterfield Garnet Lee and Stan Worthington achieved a 6th wicket partnership of 212 which remains a Derbyshire record.

Samuel Cadman's efforts at team-building brought two significant players into the club during the season – Charlie Elliott and Bill Copson. Elliott went on to play for around 20 years and made nearly 12,000 runs for the club. Copson stayed almost as long and took 1000 wickets. He marked his debut in the match against Surrey when he took the wicket of Andrew Sandham on his first ball. Thomas Higson who also joined in the season played three years before moving to Lancashire. William Wright playing two matches, and Stanley Walker playing one match made their only first class career appearances in the season.

=== Matches ===
List of matches
No.	Date	V	Result	Margin	Notes
1	7 May 1932	Lancashire; Old Trafford, Manchester	Lost	72 runs	Hopwood 5–35
2	14 May 1932	Warwickshire; County Ground, Derby	Won	123 runs	T. B. Mitchell 7–48; T R Armstrong 5–27
3	18 May 1932	Northamptonshire; County Ground, Northampton	Won	115 runs	Bakewell 101; T. B. Mitchell 5–36 and 8–62
4	21 May 1932	Yorkshire; Queen's Park, Chesterfield	Abandoned		
5	25 May 1932	Kent; Rutland Recreation Ground, Ilkeston	Drawn		Hardinge 5–19; L F Townsend 6–49
6	28 May 1932	Sussex; Queen's Park, Chesterfield	Abandoned		
7	1 Jun 1932	Nottinghamshire; Trent Bridge, Nottingham	Lost	Innings and 86 runs	Keeton 108; Larwood 5–49
8	4 Jun 1932	Hampshire; Queen's Park, Chesterfield	Lost	2 wickets	Kennedy 5–24; Bailey 5–42
9	8 Jun 1932	Surrey; Kennington Oval	Lost	199 runs	
10	11 Jun 1932	Hampshire; County Ground, Southampton	Lost	6 wickets	D Smith 103; Arnold 100; Mead 104; W H Copson 5–48
11	15 Jun 1932	Kent; Angel Ground, Tonbridge	Lost	23 runs	Freeman 6–128 and 6–85; W H Copson 5–40
12	18 Jun 1932	Leicestershire; Queen's Park, Chesterfield	Drawn		N Armstrong 113; Geary 6–40; T S Worthington 5–43
13	22 Jun 1932	Middlesex; County Ground, Derby	Drawn		Hearne 106; Hendren 119; H Storer 170; D Smith 107
14	25 Jun 1932	Nottinghamshire; Rutland Recreation Ground, Ilkeston	Won	7 wickets	Keeton 118; A V Pope 6–54
15	29 Jun 1932	Surrey; Queen's Park, Chesterfield	Drawn		Fender 5–71; Brown 6–45
16	2 Jul 1932	Essex; County Ground, Leyton	Drawn		D Smith 111; Crawley 138; T Smith 5–128; GM Lee 7–67
17	6 Jul 1932	Lancashire; Park Road Ground, Buxton	Lost	185 runs	Tyldesley 134; L F Townsend 7–80 and 5–68; Iddon 5–54 and 5–31; Sibbles 5–42
18	9 Jul 1932	Essex; Queen's Park, Chesterfield	Won	Innings and 171 runs	GM Lee 130; L F Townsend 5–33 and 6–32
19	16 Jul 1932	Somerset; County Ground, Derby	Drawn		J Lee 5–45
20	27 Jul 1932	Sussex; County Ground, Derby	Drawn		Parks 172
21	30 Jul 1932	Warwickshire; Edgbaston, Birmingham	Drawn		T. B. Mitchell 6–79; Wyatt 5–24; Paine 5–49 and 5–79
22	3 Aug 1932	Worcestershire; County Ground, New Road, Worcester	Drawn		
23	6 Aug 1932	Yorkshire; Headingley, Leeds	Lost	Innings and 89 runs	Sutcliffe 182; Leyland 113; T S Worthington 102; Verity 6–32 and 5–37; A V Pope 6–116
24	10 Aug 1932	Middlesex; Lord's Cricket Ground, St John's Wood	Drawn		Killick 128; L F Townsend 153; T. B. Mitchell 5–162; Peebles 6–104
25	13 Aug 1932	Worcestershire; County Ground, Derby	Drawn		Gibbons 109; T. B. Mitchell 6–94
26	17 Aug 1932	Indian cricket team in England in 1932; Rutland Recreation Ground, Ilkeston	Won	9 runs	Jaoomal 101; T. B. Mitchell 5–77 and 5–71; L F Townsend 5–78
27	20 Aug 1932	Northamptonshire; Queen's Park, Chesterfield	Won	Innings and 123 runs	Cox 7–91; L F Townsend 7–37
28	24 Aug 1932	Somerset; County Ground, Taunton	Drawn		F Lee 145
29	27 Aug 1932	Leicestershire; Bath Grounds, Ashby-de-la-Zouch	Won	36 runs	N Armstrong 117; Marlow 7–90; T. B. Mitchell 6–53 and 6–106

== Statistics ==
=== County Championship batting averages ===
Name	Matches	Inns	Runs	High score	Average	100s
H Storer	7	13	538	170	41.38	1
D Smith	26	46	1451	111	34.54	3
T S Worthington	24	40	1232	102	33.29	1
L F Townsend	26	46	1350	153*	30.68	1
A W Richardson	24	42	1193	90	29.82	0
WJ Wright	1	1	28	28	28.00	0
LB Blaxland	2	3	83	54	27.66	0
GM Lee	25	44	938	130	21.81	1
CC Clarke	5	8	118	31	16.85	0
A V Pope	12	19	267	53	15.70	0
A E Alderman	19	35	513	62	15.54	0
GHC Beet	4	7	92	35*	15.33	0
H Elliott	26	40	440	56*	14.19	0
A F Skinner	6	9	124	34	13.77	0
C S Elliott	19	32	397	39	13.68	0
JDH Gilbert	1	1	13	13	13.00	0
GR Jackson	5	9	113	61	12.55	0
T. B. Mitchell	23	36	256	29*	11.13	0
E Sykes	2	4	40	27	10.00	0
W H Copson	17	20	63	15	5.25	0
T R Armstrong	10	13	34	10	4.85	0
SG Walker	1	2	8	7	4.00	0
TA Higson	1	2	7	7	3.50	0

=== County Championship bowling averages ===
Name	Balls	Runs	Wickets	BB	Average
T. B. Mitchell	6017	2414	111	8–62	21.74
L F Townsend	6155	1938	104	7–37	18.63
T S Worthington	4121	1522	53	5–83	28.71
W H Copson	3329	1231	46	5–40	26.76
A V Pope	1610	610	25	6–54	24.40
GM Lee	1952	879	24	7–67	36.62
T R Armstrong	1201	397	18	5–27	22.05
SG Walker	18	6	1	1–6	6.00
D Smith	54	18	1	1–2	18.00
C S Elliott	132	66	1	1–10	66.00
H Storer	180	80	0		
A F Skinner	24	3	0		
A W Richardson	12	9	0		

== Wicket-keeper ==
H Elliott Catches 59 Stumping 14

== See also ==
- Derbyshire County Cricket Club seasons
- 1932 English cricket season
