= Derbyshire County Cricket Club in 1930 =

1930 season of an English cricket team

Derbyshire County Cricket Club seasons
1930 season
- Captain: Guy Jackson
- County Championship: 9
- Most runs: Harry Storer
- Most wickets: Tommy Mitchell
- Most catches: Harry Elliott

Derbyshire County Cricket Club in 1930 was the cricket season when the English club Derbyshire had been playing for fifty nine years. It was their thirty-second season in the County Championship and they won seven matches to finish ninth in the County Championship..

== 1930 season ==
Derbyshire played 28 games in the County Championship, and one match against the touring Australians. They lost to the Australians and won seven of their County Championship matches to finish ninth.

Guy Jackson was in his seventh season as captain. Alf Pope made his first class debut for Derbyshire in the season and went on the play until 1939, making his main contribution as a bowler. John Gilbert also made his debut and played occasional games for Derbyshire until 1936.

Harry Storer was top scorer and Tommy Mitchell took most wickets.

=== Matches ===
List of matches
No.	Date	V	Result	Margin	Notes
1	10 May 1930	Middlesex; Lord's Cricket Ground, St John's Wood	Drawn		Robins 6-73
2	14 May 1930	Sussex; County Ground, Derby	Won	Innings and 6 runs	AG Slater 5-45; Tate 5-45; T S Worthington 5-35
3	21 May 1930	Australian; Queen's Park, Chesterfield	Lost	10 wickets	Ponsford 131; Hornibrook 6-61 and 6-82
4	24 May 1930	Northamptonshire; County Ground, Derby	Lost	8 runs	Jupp 5–51; T. B. Mitchell 7-25; Thomas 5-46
5	28 May 1930	Kent; Rutland Recreation Ground, Ilkeston	Won	199 runs	GR Jackson 140; L F Townsend 104; Freeman 9-50; T. B. Mitchell 5-50
6	31 May 1930	Middlesex; The Town Ground, Burton-on-Trent	Won	7 wickets	L F Townsend 141
7	04 Jun 1930	Glamorgan; St Helen's, Swansea	Lost	29 runs	DE Davies 5-45; T. B. Mitchell 7-61
8	07 Jun 1930	Warwickshire; County Ground, Derby	Drawn		H Storer 102; L F Townsend 117; Croom 110; Wyatt 145; T S Worthington 5-77
9	11 Jun 1930	Northamptonshire; County Ground, Northampton	Won	71 runs	EW Clark 5-68; T. B. Mitchell 6-28
10	14 Jun 1930	Kent; Angel Ground, Tonbridge	Lost	9 wickets	Freeman 8-70 and 5-40
11	18 Jun 1930	Sussex; Cricket Field Road Ground, Horsham	Lost	Innings and 34 runs	Wensley 120; Bowley 5-63
12	21 Jun 1930	Somerset; Queen's Park, Chesterfield	Won	10 wickets	AG Slater 7-31 and 7-17
13	25 Jun 1930	Leicestershire; Aylestone Road, Leicester	Drawn		Berry 110; T. B. Mitchell 5-119
14	28 Jun 1930	Nottinghamshire; Rutland Recreation Ground, Ilkeston	Drawn		L F Townsend 6-86
15	02 Jul 1930	Surrey; County Ground, Derby	Drawn		
16	05 Jul 1930	Worcestershire; Queen's Park, Chesterfield	Won	Innings and 13 runs	H Storer 132; T. B. Mitchell 5-87; AG Slater 8-46
17	12 Jul 1930	Nottinghamshire; Trent Bridge, Nottingham	Drawn		D Smith 105; A Staples 5-75
18	19 Jul 1930	Yorkshire; Queen's Park, Chesterfield	Abandoned		
19	23 Jul 1930	Surrey; Kennington Oval	Won	199 runs	D Smith 107; L F Townsend 102; Shepherd 5-42; T. B. Mitchell 5-40; AG Slater 5-46
20	26 Jul 1930	Essex; County Ground, Leyton	Drawn		H Storer 123; HTO Smith 6-56
21	30 Jul 1930	Leicestershire; Park Road Ground, Buxton	Drawn		AG Slater 5-36
22	02 Aug 1930	Warwickshire; Edgbaston, Birmingham	Drawn		
23	06 Aug 1930	Worcestershire; Chester Road North Ground, Kidderminster	Lost	Innings and 38 runs	Brook 6-30; T. B. Mitchell 5-74
24	09 Aug 1930	Yorkshire; Headingley, Leeds	Drawn		Leyland 186; T. B. Mitchell 5-92; Verity 5-32
25	16 Aug 1930	Glamorgan; County Ground, Derby	Lost	165 runs	Turnbull 135; Ryan 6-86 and 6-27; T. B. Mitchell 5-64
26	20 Aug 1930	Gloucestershire; Queen's Park, Chesterfield	Drawn		Goddard 5-71;AG Slater 5-84; Parker 6-60
27	23 Aug 1930	Essex; County Ground, Derby	Drawn		Cutmore 122; O'Connor 101; H Storer 100; T. B. Mitchell 7-109
28	27 Aug 1930	Somerset; County Ground, Taunton	Lost	203 runs	Longrigg 108; T. B. Mitchell 6-79; JC White 5-69; Young 8-30
29	30 Aug 1930	Gloucestershire; Fry's Ground, Bristol	Lost	8 wickets	L F Townsend 7-57; Parker 8-62

== Statistics ==
=== County Championship batting averages ===
Name	Matches	Inns	Runs	High score	Average	100s
H Storer	25	44	1398	132	33.28	4
L F Townsend	27	46	1234	141	30.09	4
D Smith	20	35	975	107	29.54	2
GR Jackson	27	45	1165	140	25.88	1
AG Slater	26	40	691	59*	22.29	0
GM Lee	24	40	742	78	21.20	0
JM Hutchinson	20	32	483	58	20.12	0
A E Alderman	16	22	348	52	18.31	0
T S Worthington	26	40	694	83	18.26	0
NM Ford	7	10	155	65	17.22	0
H Elliott	27	36	363	45	12.96	0
CC Clarke	4	6	56	35*	11.20	0
JDH Gilbert	4	6	65	25	10.83	0
J Bowden	7	13	126	28	9.69	0
T. B. Mitchell	26	32	167	25*	7.95	0
CKH Hill-Wood	3	4	30	14	7.50	0
A W Richardson	4	6	26	16	5.20	0
T R Armstrong	2	3	7	5	2.33	0
A V Pope	2	3	3	2*	3.00	0

Leading first-class batsmen for Derbyshire by runs scored
Name	Mat	Inns	Runs	HS	Ave	100
H Storer	26	46	1488	132	32.34	4
L F Townsend	28	48	1273	141	26.52	4
GR Jackson	28	47	1177	140	25.04	1
D Smith	20	35	975	107	29.54	2
GM Lee	25	42	758	78	18.05	0

(a) Figures adjusted for non CC matches

=== County Championship bowling averages ===
Name	Balls	Runs	Wickets	BB	Average
T. B. Mitchell	6369	2445	134	7-25	18.24
AG Slater	4869	1632	81	8-46	20.14
L F Townsend	4493	1438	61	7-57	23.57
T S Worthington	3853	1571	54	5-35	29.09
H Storer	957	417	13	3-28	32.07
A V Pope	342	148	7	3-34	21.14
GM Lee	528	248	5	2-24	49.60
T R Armstrong	258	117	4	3-48	29.25
D Smith	216	105	2	1-21	52.50
CKH Hill-Wood	298	121	1	1-57	121.00
A E Alderman	40	38	1	1-21	38.00
JM Hutchinson	18	3	0		
A W Richardson	10	19	0		
J Bowden	6	5	0		

Leading first class bowlers for Derbyshire by wickets taken
Name	Balls	Runs	Wkts	BBI	Ave
T. B. Mitchell	6619	2536	138	7-25	18.38
AG Slater	4995	1666	81	8-46	20.57
L F Townsend	4751	1517	63	7-57	24.08
T S Worthington	4105	1683	58	5-35	29.02
H Storer	999	441	13	3-28	33.92

=== Wicket keeping ===
- Harry Elliott Catches 37 Stumping 19

== See also ==
- Derbyshire County Cricket Club seasons
- 1930 English cricket season
