= Arthur Walker Richardson =

English cricketer

Arthur Richardson
Personal information
- Full name: Arthur Walker Richardson
- Born: 4 March 1907; Quarndon, Derbyshire, England
- Died: 29 July 1983 (aged 76); Ednaston, England
- Batting: Right-handed
- Relatives: William Richardson (son)

Domestic team information
- Years: Team
- 1928–1936: Derbyshire
- FC debut: 5 May 1928 Derbyshire v West Indians
- Last FC: 26 August 1936 Derbyshire v Leicestershire

Career statistics
Competition	First-class
Matches	159
Runs scored	3982
Batting average	19.05
100s/50s	0/17
Top score	90
Balls bowled	34
Wickets	0
Bowling average	–
5 wickets in innings	–
10 wickets in match	–
Best bowling	–
Catches/stumpings	58/–
- Source: CricketArchive, 13 February 2010

Arthur Walker Richardson (4 March 1907 – 29 July 1983) was an English cricketer who played first-class cricket for Derbyshire between 1928 and 1936. He captained the Derbyshire team between 1931 and 1936, concluding with Derbyshire's first victory in the County Championship.

Richardson was born at Quarndon, Derbyshire. He was educated at Winchester College and in a match against Harrow School scored 117 for the Winchester XI in a partnership of 295. At the start of the 1928 season he made his debut for Derbyshire against the West Indies. In his first three seasons he managed a highest score of 70 and his best seasonal average was 25. He became Derbyshire captain in the 1931 season and led his team to 7th in the points table. In the 1932 season he scored 1,258 runs with an average of 29.95 and made his highest score of 90 against Nottinghamshire, although the team fell back to 10th in the Championship. He led the team progressively up to sixth in the 1933 season, third in the 1934 season, and second in the 1935 season with 16 wins. In the 1936 season the club won the County Championship winning 13 matches. He was supported by batsmen Stan Worthington, Leslie Townsend, Denis Smith and Albert Alderman each of whom scored over a thousand runs and several centuries. Bill Copson, Tommy Mitchell, Alf Pope and Leslie Townsend accounted for most of the wickets taken. Richardson finished his cricket career at the end of the 1936 season. Wisden stated that he achieved much by his own enthusiasm and warm personality.

Richardson was a right-handed middle order batsman and played 239 innings in 159 matches with an average of 19.05 and a top score of 90. As a batsman, he was considered rather ungainly but solid and he scored mainly on the leg. As a fielder he was a good mid-off. He only bowled 34 balls in his first-class career taking no wickets.

Richardson died at Ednaston, Derbyshire at the age of 76. His son William Richardson and grandson Alastair Richardson also played for Derbyshire.

Sporting positions
Preceded by Guy Jackson	Derbyshire cricket captains 1931–1936	Succeeded by Robin Buckston
