= Derbyshire County Cricket Club in 1931 =

1931 season of an English cricket team

Derbyshire County Cricket Club seasons
1931 season
- Captain: A W Richardson
- County Championship: 7
- Most runs: Denis Smith
- Most wickets: Archibald Slater
- Most catches: Harry Elliott

Derbyshire County Cricket Club in 1931 represents the cricket season when the English club Derbyshire had been playing for sixty years. It was their thirty-third season in the County Championship and they won seven matches to finish seventh.

== 1931 season ==
Derbyshire were fortunate in persuading A. W. Richardson to become captain in 1931. Building on the efforts of Guy Jackson and with the help of the coach, Sam Cadman, Richardson set about building the team that became a match-winning combination and took the championship in 1936.

Derbyshire played 28 games in the County Championship, and one match against the touring New Zealanders. Denis Smith was top scorer with two centuries. Veteran Archibald Slater, in his last season, took 106 wickets closely followed by Tommy Mitchell on 105.

The only new arrival in the Derbyshire side in 1931 was Alan Skinner who was to see many years service with the club.

=== Matches ===
List of matches
| No. | Date | V | Result | Margin | Notes |
| 1 | 2 May 1931 | Leicestershire; County Ground, Derby | Drawn | | |
| 2 | 6 May 1931 | Gloucestershire; The Victoria Ground, Cheltenham | Lost | 4 wickets | Parker 6–41 and 8–50 |
| 3 | 9 May 1931 | Surrey; Kennington Oval | Drawn | | A E Alderman 113; Fender 100 |
| 4 | 16 May 1931 | Kent; County Ground, Derby | Lost | 9 wickets | Freeman 5–63; AG Slater 8–63 |
| 5 | 20 May 1931 | Essex; County Ground, Leyton | Drawn | | D Smith 131; GM Lee 147 |
| 6 | 23 May 1931 | Warwickshire; Edgbaston, Birmingham | Drawn | | Croom 103; Paine 6–80 |
| 7 | 27 May 1931 | Worcestershire; County Ground, New Road, Worcester | Drawn | | |
| 8 | 30 May 1931 | Sussex; Queen's Park, Chesterfield | Won | Innings and 188 runs | T. B. Mitchell 6–11 and 6–19 |
| 9 | 6 Jun 1931 | Nottinghamshire; Rutland Recreation Ground, Ilkeston | Drawn | | L F Townsend 6–59 |
| 10 | 13 Jun 1931 | New Zealand County Ground, Derby | Drawn | | Not a County Championship match T. B. Mitchell 5–97 |
| 11 | 17 Jun 1931 | Essex; Rutland Recreation Ground, Ilkeston | Drawn | | AG Slater 8–51 |
| 12 | 20 Jun 1931 | Hampshire; Queen's Park, Chesterfield | Won | 8 wickets | D Smith 108; T. B. Mitchell 5–47 |
| 13 | 24 Jun 1931 | Glamorgan; Cardiff Arms Park | Drawn | | |
| 14 | 27 Jun 1931 | Worcestershire; County Ground, Derby | Won | 7 wickets | Gibbons 109; Root 5–113; H Storer 5–32 |
| 15 | 1 Jul 1931 | Surrey; Queen's Park, Chesterfield | Drawn | | T. B. Mitchell 6–157; Fender 6–102 |
| 16 | 4 Jul 1931 | Leicestershire; Bath Grounds, Ashby-de-la-Zouch | Drawn | | AG Slater 5–28 |
| 17 | 8 Jul 1931 | Sussex; County Ground, Hove | Lost | Innings and 14 runs | Wensley 6–47 and 6–48; T S Worthington 5–80 |
| 18 | 11 Jul 1931 | Hampshire; County Ground, Southampton | Won | 145 runs | Baring 5–85; L F Townsend 6–23; |
| 19 | 18 Jul 1931 | Gloucestershire; Queen's Park, Chesterfield | Lost | 18 runs | T. B. Mitchell 6–79; Goddard 8–79; Parker 6–64 |
| 20 | 22 Jul 1931 | Northamptonshire; County Ground, Derby | Won | 6 wickets | GM Lee 173; Timms 147; T. B. Mitchell 5–39 |
| 21 | 25 Jul 1931 | Middlesex; Rutland Recreation Ground, Ilkeston | Drawn | | Peebles 5–58; AG Slater 5–32 |
| 22 | 29 Jul 1931 | Lancashire; Park Road Ground, Buxton | Drawn | | L F Townsend 6–49; Hopwood 5–52 |
| 23 | 1 Aug 1931 | Warwickshire; County Ground, Derby | Lost | 9 wickets | Partridge 5–47; Paine 5–67 |
| 24 | 5 Aug 1931 | Kent; St Lawrence Ground, Canterbury | Drawn | | L F Townsend 5–78; Freeman 5–77; Marriott 5–42 |
| 25 | 8 Aug 1931 | Nottinghamshire; Trent Bridge, Nottingham | Drawn | | |
| 26 | 15 Aug 1931 | Northamptonshire; County Ground, Northampton | Won | Innings and 71 runs | GM Lee 141; L F Townsend 8–45; |
| 27 | 19 Aug 1931 | Middlesex; Lord's Cricket Ground, St John's Wood | No play | | Match abandoned |
| 28 | 22 Aug 1931 | Glamorgan; Queen's Park, Chesterfield | Won | 184 runs | Ryan 7–105; AG Slater 5–27; Mercer 5–37; |
| 29 | 26 Aug 1931 | Lancashire; Stanley Park, Blackpool | Lost | 3 wickets | AG Slater 5–22; Tyldesley 6–21 |

== Statistics ==
=== County Championship batting averages ===
| Name | Matches | Inns | Runs | High score | Average | 100s |
|---|---|---|---|---|---|---|
| GM Lee | 26 | 39 | 1152 | 173 | 32.91 | 3 |
| H Storer | 22 | 35 | 1028 | 115* | 32.12 | 1 |
| D Smith | 27 | 43 | 1214 | 131 | 31.12 | 2 |
| A E Alderman | 27 | 40 | 895 | 113* | 27.96 | 1 |
| GR Jackson | 7 | 11 | 270 | 81 | 24.54 | 0 |
| L F Townsend | 25 | 33 | 673 | 80* | 21.70 | 0 |
| T S Worthington | 27 | 37 | 589 | 45 | 19.00 | 0 |
| A V Pope | 2 | 3 | 36 | 16 | 18.00 | 0 |
| JM Hutchinson | 9 | 14 | 218 | 71 | 16.76 | 0 |
| AG Slater | 27 | 35 | 483 | 52 | 15.58 | 0 |
| A W Richardson | 26 | 32 | 374 | 49 | 13.35 | 0 |
| T. B. Mitchell | 27 | 28 | 182 | 29 | 10.70 | 0 |
| H Elliott | 27 | 32 | 264 | 37 | 9.77 | 0 |
| NM Ford | 2 | 4 | 26 | 24 | 6.50 | 0 |
| CC Clarke | 4 | 6 | 36 | 21 | 6.00 | 0 |
| JDH Gilbert | 5 | 3 | 12 | 6 | 4.00 | 0 |
| A F Skinner | 1 | 1 | 4 | 4 | 4.00 | 0 |
| T R Armstrong | 6 | 8 | 18 | 15 | 3.00 | 0 |

=== County Championship bowling averages ===
| Name | Balls | Runs | Wickets | BB | Average |
|---|---|---|---|---|---|
| AG Slater | 5526 | 1714 | 106 | 8–51 | 16.16 |
| T. B. Mitchell | 5525 | 2218 | 105 | 6–11 | 21.12 |
| L F Townsend | 3072 | 1098 | 72 | 8–45 | 15.25 |
| T S Worthington | 3882 | 1362 | 57 | 5–80 | 23.89 |
| H Storer | 958 | 408 | 16 | 5–32 | 25.50 |
| GM Lee | 922 | 347 | 14 | 4–34 | 24.78 |
| T R Armstrong | 335 | 85 | 7 | 2–9 | 12.14 |
| A V Pope | 342 | 114 | 6 | 4–54 | 19.00 |
| D Smith | 156 | 42 | 0 | | |
| A E Alderman | 24 | 10 | 0 | | |
| GR Jackson | 17 | 20 | 0 | | |
| A W Richardson | 12 | 6 | 0 | | |

== Wicket-keeper ==
H Elliott Catches 43 Stumping 28

== See also ==
- Derbyshire County Cricket Club seasons
- 1931 English cricket season
