= Alf Pope =

English cricketer (1909–1996)

Personal information
- Full name: Alfred Vardy Pope
- Born: 15 August 1909; Tibshelf, Derbyshire, England
- Died: 11 May 1996 (aged 86); Derby, England
- Height: 1.95 m (6 ft 5 in)
- Batting: Right-handed
- Bowling: Right-arm off-break; Right-arm fast-medium
- Relatives: George Pope (brother); Harold Pope (brother)

Domestic team information
- Years: Team
- 1930–1939: Derbyshire
- FC debut: 31 May 1930 Derbyshire v Middlesex
- Last FC: 30 August 1939 Derbyshire v Leicestershire

Career statistics
Competition	First-class
Matches	214
Runs scored	4,963
Batting average	18.38
100s/50s	1/17
Top score	103
Balls bowled	33,305
Wickets	555
Bowling average	22.54
5 wickets in innings	22
10 wickets in match	3
Best bowling	7/84
Catches/stumpings	99/–
- Source: CricketArchive, 11 August 2010

Alfred Vardy Pope (15 August 1909 – 11 May 1996) was an English cricketer who played first-class cricket for Derbyshire between 1930 and 1939. He was in the club's championship winning team of 1936 and took 555 wickets overall.

Pope was born at Tibshelf, Derbyshire and began work as a coal miner at the age of 14. Between 1923 and 1926, he was playing for the Tibshelf colliery cricket club which played in the Bassetlaw League and the Nottinghamshire and Derbyshire Collieries League. In 1925 at the age of 16, he was one of the scorers in a Derbyshire match at the County Ground. He joined Samuel Cadman's nursery at Derbyshire during the General Strike of 1926.

Pope made his debut for Derbyshire in the 1930 season in May against Middlesex, taking 3 wickets in total and finishing not out in the only innings he played. He played one more match that year, and twice in the 1931 season taking a reasonable wicket toll in all matches. In the 1932 season he started playing the full season and achieved two five wicket innings with 6 for 54 against Nottinghamshire. In the 1933 season he achieved 7 for 84 against Sussex and in the 1934 season he took 6 for 21 against Nottinghamshire. He managed five 5 wicket innings in the 1935 season, two of them in one match against Hampshire giving him a 10 wicket match total. In Derbyshire's Championship winning season of 1936 Pope achieved four 5 five wicket innings with 6 for 129 and 11 wickets in the whole match against Northamptonshire. As his brother George was unavailable to bowl in the season, his captain Arthur Richardson, would warn him he might have to bowl until close of play. Pope would respond cheerfully with "I like bowling, skipper".

With his brother back in the 1937 season he shared the honours again, but achieved 5–85 against Kent. In the 1938 season he had four 5 wicket innings with a best of 6 for 48 against Sussex. He also made his top run score of 103 runs in 1938 against Warwickshire. In the 1939 season his best bowling was 6 for 44 against Surrey. With the outbreak of the Second World War, first-class cricket was suspended and he didn't have the chance to play first-class games again. Pope was a right-hand batsman who played 316 innings in 214 first-class matches for Derbyshire with a top score of 103 and an average of 18.38. He was a right-arm off-break and right-arm fast-medium bowler who took 555 first-class wickets at an average of 22.54 and a best performance of 7 for 84. He took 5 or more wickets in 22 innings, and took 10 wickets in 3 matches.

In 1940 and 1941 Pope appeared in matches for the Bradford League and in 1941 with Bill Copson took Saltaire to the Bradford League title. He and Copson were signed for Windhill Cricket Club for the 1942 season. He played games for the North of England in 1942 and a non-status game for Derbyshire in 1945.

Following the war Pope took a number of coaching ad professional jobs. He was at one time employed as a P. E. Instructor at St Joseph's College, Blackpool where he lived in Cleveleys and cycled to work. Pupils' recollections refer to Alf Pope – a "cricketer" and his punishments with his favourite cricket bat. He then spent twenty years coaching and as groundsman at Berkhamsted School.

Pope umpired one first-class match in 1951. He reappeared at Derbyshire in 1954 playing a couple of games for the club and ground. By 1957 he was coaching at Chesham Cricket Club where he coached Mike Taylor.

Pope died at Derby at the age of 86. His brothers George Pope and Harold Pope followed him into the Derbyshire team. His son Anthony played for Derbyshire 2nd XI and in various non-status matches for the MCC.
