= Niel Walker =

English cricketer

Personal information
- Full name: Niel Alexander McDonald Walker
- Born: 22 August 1895; Poona, British India
- Died: 10 August 1960 (aged 64); Sheffield, England
- Batting: Right-handed
- Bowling: Right-arm medium

Domestic team information
- Years: Team
- 1923/24–1926/27: Europeans
- 1931–1936: Derbyshire
- FC debut: 18 March 1924 Europeans v Hindus
- Last FC: 13 May 1936 Derbyshire v Kent

Career statistics
Competition	First-class
Matches	4
Runs scored	48
Batting average	8.00
100s/50s	0/0
Top score	18
Balls bowled	204
Wickets	2
Bowling average	38.50
5 wickets in innings	0
10 wickets in match	0
Best bowling	1/12
Catches/stumpings	1/–
- Source: CricketArchive, February 2012

Niel Alexander McDonald Walker (22 August 1895 – 10 August 1960) was a British army officer and a cricketer who played in tournaments in India and for Derbyshire.

Walker was born at Poona in the Bombay Presidency in British India. At the start of the First World War he was at the Royal Military College, Sandhurst, and was commissioned as a 2nd Lieutenant into the Sherwood Foresters on 12 May 1915.

After the war Walker saw service in India, where he also took part in cricket tournaments. In 1924 he played for the Europeans in the Lahore Tournament, and in 1926 against a Marylebone Cricket Club (MCC) touring side led by Arthur Gilligan. In 1927 and 1928 he played for the Europeans in the Sind Tournament. He was in England when he played for Derbyshire in 1931 against New Zealand. He played for Derbyshire again in the 1936 in their Championship winning season against Kent.

Walker was a right-hand batsman who played 6 innings in 4 first-class matches. His top score was 18 and his average 8. He was a right-arm medium pace bowler and took 2 wickets at an average of 38.5.

Walker saw service in the Second World War and became a brigadier commanding 113 Infantry Brigade in April to June 1942.

Walker died at Sheffield, Yorkshire at the age of 65.
