= 1936 English cricket season =

1936 was the 43rd season of County Championship cricket in England. Derbyshire won the championship for the first time. India were on tour and England won the Test series 2–0.

== Honours ==
- County Championship – Derbyshire
- Minor Counties Championship – Hertfordshire
- Wisden – Charles Barnett, Bill Copson, Alf Gover, Vijay Merchant, Stan Worthington

== Test series ==
=== India tour ===
England defeated India 2–0 with one match drawn.

== Leading batsmen ==
Wally Hammond topped the averages with 2107 runs @ 56.94

== Leading bowlers ==
Harold Larwood topped the averages with 119 wickets @ 12.97

== Annual reviews ==
- Wisden Cricketers' Almanack 1937
