= William Wright (cricketer, born 1909) =

English cricketer

Personal information
- Full name: William John Wright
- Born: 24 February 1909; Clay Cross, Derbyshire, England
- Died: 12 August 1988 (aged 79); Poole, Dorset, England
- Batting: Right-handed

Domestic team information
- Years: Team
- 1932: Derbyshire
- FC debut: 17 August 1932 Derbyshire v Indians
- Last FC: 20 August 1932 Derbyshire v Northamptonshire

Career statistics
Competition	First-class
Matches	2
Runs scored	58
Batting average	19.33
100s/50s	0/0
Top score	28
Catches/stumpings	0/–
- Source: CricketArchive, January 2012

William John Wright (24 February 1909 – 12 August 1988) was an English cricketer who played for Derbyshire during the 1932 season.

Wright was born in Danesmoor, Clay Cross, Derbyshire. He made his debut for Derbyshire in the 1932 season against touring Indians in August, in which he scored 23 in his first innings. Wright's only other match for Derbyshire was three days later in a County Championship match against Northamptonshire. Wright, opening the batting, made 28, and Derbyshire won by an innings and 123 runs, thanks to eleven match wickets by Test cricketer Leslie Townsend.

Wright was a right-handed batsman and played 3 innings in 2 first-class matches with an average of 19.33 and a top score of 28.

Wright died in Poole, Dorset.
