= Derbyshire County Cricket Club in 1936 =

1936 season of an English cricket team

Derbyshire County Cricket Club seasons
1936 season
- Captain: A W Richardson
- County Championship: 1
- Most runs: Stan Worthington
- Most wickets: Bill Copson
- Most catches: Harry Elliott

Derbyshire County Cricket Club in 1936 was the cricket season when the English club Derbyshire won the County Championship for the first and only time. They had been playing for sixty five years and it was their thirty-eighth season in the County Championship.

== 1936 season ==
Success in the County Championship saw the culmination of five years effort by A. W. Richardson since he became captain in 1931. Derbyshire had actually come second in the championship in 1935 with a better set of results. Middlesex and Yorkshire made strong challenges in the closing weeks of the 1936 season which kept tensions high in the Derbyshire camp. When he heard that the Championship had been settled the Duke of Devonshire, the Derbyshire President, left a shooting party at Bolton Abbey in a hurry to get to Derby and join the public reception given to the players on their return.

Derbyshire played 28 games in the County Championship, and one match against Oxford University and one match against the touring Indians. Stan Worthington and Leslie Townsend tied as top scorers in the County Championships, but Worthington's 174 against Oxford University gave him the edge in first class batting positions. Bill Copson's 140 wickets made him top bowler for the county.

Worthington also played for England in Test matches against the Indians.

George Langdale made his debut for Derbyshire and went on to play one first team game in 1937. Samuel Hunt also made his debut, but only played the 1936 season

=== Matches ===
List of matches
No.	Date	V	Result	Margin	Notes
1	6 May 1936	Hampshire; At County Ground, Southampton	Drawn		R H Moore 100; C G A Paris 101
2	9 May 1936	Oxford University; The University Parks, Oxford	Won	Innings and 130 runs	Not a County Championship match T S Worthington 174; R F H Darwell-Smith 5–134
3	13 May 1936	Kent; Bat and Ball Ground, Gravesend	Lost	10 wickets	A P Freeman 7–29; W H Copson 5–57; D V P Wright 5–31
4	16 May 1936	Surrey; County Ground, Derby	Won	16 runs	A R Gover 5–63; W H Copson 5–33 and 7–19; F R Brown 5–53
5	23 May 1936	Sussex; Queen's Park, Chesterfield	Won	Innings and 25 runs	L F Townend 182;W H Copson 5–42
6	27 May 1936	Gloucestershire; Ashley Down Ground, Bristol	Won	10 Wickets	R A Sinfield 7–54; T. B. Mitchell 5–40
7	30 May 1936	Essex; County Ground, Derby	Drawn		
8	3 Jun 1936	Northamptonshire; County Ground, Northampton	Won	7 Wickets	W H Copson 6–24
9	10 Jun 1936	Gloucestershire; County Ground, Derby	Won	10 Wickets	T. B. Mitchell 7–26
10	13 Jun 1936	Yorkshire; Queen's Park, Chesterfield	Drawn		L F Townsend 101; W E Bowes 5–66; T. B. Mitchell 6–60
11	17 Jun 1936	Somerset; Rutland Recreation Ground, Ilkeston	Lost	10 Wickets	H Hunt 7–49; T. B. Mitchell 5–90
12	20 Jun 1936	Warwickshire; Edgbaston, Birmingham	Won	Innings and 10 runs	L F Townsend 5–44 and 7–46; T. B. Mitchell 5–42
13	24 Jun 1936	Worcestershire Queen's Park, Chesterfield	Won	3 Wickets	H H I H Gibbons 99; W H Copson 5–34; R T D Perks 5–63
14	27 Jun 1936	Lancashire; Park Road Ground, Buxton	Drawn		F S Booth 6–16; A V Pope 5–53
15	1 Jul 1936	Worcestershire; County Ground, New Road, Worcester	Won	Innings and 123 runs	W H Copson 5–38 and 7–16
16	4 Jul 1936	Warwickshire; Queen's Park, Chesterfield	Won	Innings and 159 runs	T S Worthington 163; T. B. Mitchell 5–52
17	8 Jul 1936	Hampshire; Queen's Park, Chesterfield	Drawn		L F Townsend 153
18	11 Jul 1936	Lancashire; Old Trafford, Manchester	Drawn		F M Sibbles 7–36
19	15 Jul 1936	Kent; The Town Ground, Burton-on-Trent	Won	141 Runs	L F Townsend 115; A V Pope 5–48
20	18 Jul 1936	Indians; County Ground, Derby	Drawn		Not a County Championship match W H Copson 5–44
21	22 Jul 1936	Yorkshire; Bramall Lane, Sheffield	Drawn		T S Worthington 135; A Mitchell 103;W H Copson 6–60
22	25 Jul 1936	Nottinghamshire; Rutland Recreation Ground, Ilkeston	Lost	6 Wickets	T. B. Mitchell 6–87; W Voce 6–43
23	1 Aug 1936	Essex; County Ground, Chelmsford	Won	20 runs	K Farnes 5–20; T P B Smith 5–62; T. B. Mitchell 6–25
24	5 Aug 1936	Surrey; Kennington Oval	Drawn		D Smith 106; T. B. Mitchell 5–88
25	8 Aug 1936	Leicestershire; County Ground, Derby	Won	9 Wickets	W H Copson 5–40; T. B. Mitchell 5–57 and 5–42; G Geary 5–39
26	15 Aug 1936	Nottinghamshire; Town Ground, Worksop	Drawn		W W Keaton 100; C B Harris 107
27	19 Aug 1936	Sussex; The Saffrons, Eastbourne	Drawn		J Langridge 126; W H Copson 6–87
28	22 Aug 1936	Northamptonshire; Queen's Park, Chesterfield	Drawn		R J Partridge 5–69; A V Pope 6–129
29	26 Aug 1936	Somerset; Rowden Road, Wells	Lost	1 Wicket	A V Pope 5–35; A W Wellard 5–47; W H Copson 6–81
30	29 Aug 1936	Leicestershire; Oakham School Ground	Won	Innings and 66 runs	D Smith 169; T S Worthington 102

== Statistics ==
=== County Championship batting averages ===
Name	Matches	Inns	Runs	High score	Average	100s
T S Worthington	26	40	1322	163	35.72	3
L F Townsend	28	43	1322	182*	33.89	4
D Smith	28	46	1256	169	30.63	2
A E Alderman	28	46	1074	79	25.57	0
W W H Hill-Wood	1	2	48	38	24.00	0
A F Skinner	12	20	441	62	22.05	0
H Elliott	28	41	639	79*	19.96	0
C S Elliott	18	26	426	97	18.52	0
H Storer	9	13	205	62	15.76	0
E Carrington	7	11	157	72	14.27	0
A V Pope	28	38	441	40	13.78	0
G R Langdale	3	5	064	29	12.80	0
A W Richardson	26	34	378	50	12.60	0
T. B. Mitchell	26	32	267	45	10.68	0
N A M Walker	1	2	20	13	10.00	0
S W Hunt	5	5	48	17	9.60	0
G H Pope	4	6	50	14	8.33	0
T R Armstrong	2	3	16	8*	8.00	0
A F Townsend	2	3	23	21	7.66	0
W H Copson	26	29	89	17	5.56	0

In addition, John Gilbert appeared for Derbyshire against Oxford University.

=== County Championship bowling averages ===
Name	Balls	Runs	Wickets	BB	Average
W H Copson	4731	1792	140	7–16	12.80
T. B. Mitchell	3842	2373	116	7–26	20.45
A V Pope	5071	1666	94	6–129	17.72
L F Townsend	3111	1062	54	7–46	19.66
T S Worthington	1337	584	19	4–31	30.73
G H Pope	337	128	5	2–35	25.60
T R Armstrong	198	95	4	2–2	23.75
D Smith	18	13	1	1–13	13.00
G R Langdale	156	95	0		
A F Townsend	36	23	0		
A F Skinner	18	15	0		
N A M Walker	12	10	0		
C S Elliott	12	9	0		
S W Hunt	6	3	0		

=== Wicket-keeper ===
H Elliott Catches 50 Stumping 12

== See also ==
- Derbyshire County Cricket Club seasons
- 1936 English cricket season
