= Robin Buckston =

English cricketer

Personal information
- Full name: Robin Henry Rowland Buckston
- Born: 10 October 1908; Kensington, England
- Died: 19 May 1967 (aged 58); Burton upon Trent, England
- Batting: Right-handed
- Role: Batsman
- Relatives: George Buckston (father)

Domestic team information
- Years: Team
- 1928–1939: Derbyshire
- FC debut: 1 September 1928 Derbyshire v Lancashire
- Last FC: 30 August 1939 Derbyshire v Leicestershire

Career statistics
| Competition | First-class |
|---|---|
| Matches | 74 |
| Runs scored | 944 |
| Batting average | 11.80 |
| 100s/50s | 0/1 |
| Top score | 60 |
| Balls bowled | 6 |
| Wickets | 0 |
| Bowling average | – |
| 5 wickets in innings | – |
| 10 wickets in match | – |
| Best bowling | – |
| Catches/stumpings | 18/2 |
- Source: CricketArchive, 14 February 2010

Robin Henry Rowland Buckston (10 October 1908 – 16 May 1967) was an English cricketer who played first-class cricket for Derbyshire between 1928 and 1939 and for Marylebone Cricket Club (MCC) in 1929 and 1930. He captained the Derbyshire team between 1937 and 1939.

Buckston was born in Kensington, the son of George Moreton Buckston who had played for and captained Derbyshire before and after World War I. He was educated at Eton and played in the Eton XI as a wicketkeeper. He first played for Derbyshire at the age of 19 in the 1928 season as wicketkeeper in a match against Lancashire, but did not play for them again until 1937. He played two matches for MCC against Wales in 1929 and 1930 and a game for the Free Foresters against the Netherlands in 1931. He became captain of Derbyshire in the 1937 season when after their Championship win in the 1936 season, the club came third in the Championship. In the 1938 season they were fifth and in the 1939 season they were ninth under Buckston. He played 101 innings in 72 matches for Derbyshire with a highest score of 60 and an average of 11.80. He only bowled one over and was an occasional wicketkeeper.

Buckston had been a member of the Eton Officers' Training Corps, and with the outbreak of the Second World War imminent, he was given an emergency commission as second lieutenant in the Royal Artillery on 2 September 1939. He served with the local Territorial Army light anti-aircraft regiment, he relinquished his commission on 23 November 1942, by which time he was a war substantive lieutenant; he was granted the rank of captain. He married Chrystal Tresyllian Williams on 6 January 1940. They had a son on 3 November 1945, at which time they were living at Bucklebury Common, near Reading. After the war he played for Derbyshire's Second XI from 1948 to 1955; captaining them for some of that time. He was chairman of the club from 1960 to 1966.

Buckston lived at Sutton-on-the-Hill and was a Justice of the Peace. He was High Sheriff of Derbyshire in 1960. He collapsed and died at the wheel of his car near Burton upon Trent at the age of 58.

Sporting positions
| Preceded by Arthur Richardson | Derbyshire cricket captains 1937–1939 | Succeeded by Gilbert Hodgkinson |
Honorary titles
| Preceded by | High Sheriff of Derbyshire; 1960–1961 | Succeeded by Charles Harpur Crewe |
