= David Skinner (cricketer) =

English cricketer

Personal information
- Full name: David Anthony Skinner
- Born: 22 March 1920; Duffield, England
- Died: 17 January 1998 (aged 77); Thorpe Bay, Southend-on-Sea, England
- Batting: Right-handed
- Bowling: Right-arm off-break
- Relatives: Alan Skinner (brother)

Domestic team information
- Years: Team
- 1947–1949: Derbyshire
- FC debut: 17 May 1947 Derbyshire v Worcestershire
- Last FC: 10 August 1949 Derbyshire v Northamptonshire

Career statistics
Competition	First-class
Matches	23
Runs scored	475
Batting average	13.57
100s/50s	0/1
Top score	63
Balls bowled	234
Wickets	2
Bowling average	91.00
5 wickets in innings	0
10 wickets in match	0
Best bowling	1/41
Catches/stumpings	11/–
- Source: CricketArchive, 31 January 2010

David Anthony Skinner (22 March 1920 – 17 January 1998) was an English cricketer who played first-class cricket for Derbyshire in 1947 and captained the side in 1949.

Skinner was born in Duffield and educated at The Leys School. From 1938 he played various games for Derbyshire second XI and for the Club and Ground until 1947, apart from in the interruption of the Second World War. Skinner made his first-class debut in one match in 1947, but in 1948 played only for the second XI.

Skinner was appointed as county captain for the 1949 season in accordance with the tradition of amateur captaincy. Skinner himself was a modest performer, though in this he was no different from the other amateurs – Gilbert Hodgkinson and Edward Gothard – who had captained an otherwise entirely professional side since the Second World War. The move was not successful, and Derbyshire, missing the all-round skills of George Pope, fell to 15th place in the County Championship. Towards the end of the season other amateurs appeared after fulfilling their schoolmastering commitments, and Skinner did not play in the last few matches of the season and never played first-class cricket again. Skinner was a right-handed batsman in the lower-middle-order and played 36 innings in 23 first-class matches with an average of 13.57 and a top score of 63. He was a right-arm off-break bowler who bowled occasionally taking 2 first-class wickets at an average of 91.

In 1950, Derbyshire registered the former Cambridge University and Nottinghamshire amateur Guy Willatt to take over as captain, and though the registration was delayed until August and then scuppered by an immediate injury to Willatt, the county preferred to operate under the temporary captaincy of Pat Vaulkhard than to renew Skinner's tenure, Vaulkhard having at least a reputation for successful hard-hitting batsmanship. Willatt finally took over in 1951.

Skinner continued to play in the Second XI Championship from 1951 until 1958.

Skinner died in Thorpe Bay, Southend-on-Sea, at the age of 77. His brother, Alan, also played first-class cricket for Derbyshire, having made his debut sixteen years before David.

Sporting positions
Preceded by Edward Gothard	Derbyshire cricket captains 1949	Succeeded by Pat Vaulkhard
