= George Langdale =

English cricketer, schoolmaster, and writer on mathematics

Personal information
- Full name: George Richmond Langdale
- Born: 11 March 1916; Thornaby-on-Tees, Yorkshire, England
- Died: 24 April 2002 (aged 86); Holbeck, Leeds, England
- Batting: Left-handed
- Bowling: Right-arm off-break

Domestic team information
- Years: Team
- 1936–1937: Derbyshire
- 1946–1949: Somerset
- FC debut: 15 August 1936 Derbyshire v Nottinghamshire
- Last FC: 23 May 1953 Minor Counties v Australians

Career statistics
Competition	First-class
Matches	25
Runs scored	707
Batting average	18.12
100s/50s	1/3
Top score	146
Balls bowled	1,678
Wickets	23
Bowling average	40.82
5 wickets in innings	1
10 wickets in match	0
Best bowling	5.30
Catches/stumpings	7/–
- Source: CricketArchive, January 2012

George Richmond Langdale OBE (11 March 1916 – 24 April 2002) was a schoolmaster, writer on mathematics and an English cricketer who played for Derbyshire from 1936 to 1937 and for Somerset from 1946 to 1949. He also played for the minor counties Norfolk and Berkshire.

Langdale was born in Thornaby-on-Tees in Yorkshire. He first played cricket for Derbyshire in the 1936 season taking part in three games and helping them to capture their first and only County Championship victory. In the 1937 season he played one first team game and then for the Derbyshire second team. On 1 September 1938 Langdale became a teacher at the City of Norwich School and during 1939 he played for minor county Norfolk. During the Second World War he played occasional matches including one for Anti-Aircraft Command against Balloon command, and another for the Army against the Royal Australian Air Force.

In 1946 Langdale left Norwich and began playing for Somerset. In his first match for his new county, he took five Warwickshire wickets in an innings for 30 runs and in his next, two months later, against Yorkshire at Taunton, batting at No 8, he scored 146 to enable Somerset to reach 508, though the match was drawn. He continued in the next three seasons and played for Somerset for the last time in 1949. In 1950 he appeared in a match for Sandhurst Wanderers in the Netherlands. In 1952 Langdale started playing for Berkshire as captain, and his final first-class match was in 1953 for the Minor Counties against Australia. In the same Minor Counties season, playing for Berkshire he took all 10 Dorset wickets in an innings for 25 runs. He captained Berkshire again from 1956 to 1959 and continued playing for the team until 1963. Langdale was a right-arm offbreak bowler and took 23 wickets first-class wickets with an average of 40.82 and a best performance of 5–30. He was a left-handed batsman and remained a lower-middle order batsman throughout his first-class career. He played 42 innings in 25 first-class matches with an average of 18.12 and a top score of 146.

Langdale published a number of papers on mathematical subjects and teaching, often using cricket examples. He was a senior lecturer at Welbeck College, for the Ministry of Defence. In the 1982 New Year Honours he was awarded the OBE.

Langdale died in Holbeck, Leeds in at the age of 86.

== Publications ==
- Wisden's Cricketers' Almanack and the teaching of statistics. The Mathematical Gazette, Vol. 38, No. 324, 118–120. May 1954.
- The Slide Rule The Mathematical Gazette, May 1959 p113
- A Simple Course on Astronautics The Mathematical Gazette, Vol. 47, No. 360 May 1963, pp. 107–113
- Square ball The Mathematical Gazette, October 1974 p216,
