= Howard Sherwin =

English cricketer

Personal information
- Full name: Howard Sherwin
- Born: 22 July 1911; Chesterfield, Derbyshire, England
- Died: 20 May 1997 (aged 85); March, Cambridgeshire, England
- Batting: Left-handed

Domestic team information
- Years: Team
- 1937: Derbyshire
- Only FC: 11 August 1937 Derbyshire v Gloucestershire

Career statistics
Competition	First-class
Matches	1
Runs scored	12
Batting average	–
100s/50s	0/0
Top score	9*
Balls bowled	66
Wickets	0
Bowling average	–
5 wickets in innings	–
10 wickets in match	–
Best bowling	–
Catches/stumpings	0/–
- Source: CricketArchive, February 2012

Howard Sherwin (22 July 1911 – 20 May 1997) was an English cricketer who played first-class cricket for Derbyshire County Cricket Club in 1937.

Sherwin was born in Chesterfield. In the 1937 season he played one match for Derbyshire Second XI and one first-class match against Gloucestershire. He was not out in both innings, and bowled 11 overs without taking a wicket.

Sherwin was a left-handed batsman and played two innings in one first-class match scoring 12 runs in total without losing his wicket. He bowled 11 overs for no wickets at the cost of 32 runs.

Sherwin died at March, Cambridgeshire at the age of 85.
