= Elijah Carrington =

English cricketer

Personal information
- Full name: Elijah Carrington
- Born: 25 March 1914; Blackwell, Derbyshire, England
- Died: 19 November 1998 (aged 84); Hillcote, Derbyshire, England
- Batting: Right-handed

Domestic team information
- Years: Team
- 1934–1937: Derbyshire
- FC debut: 9 June 1934 Derbyshire v Hampshire
- Last FC: 23 June 1937 Derbyshire v Hampshire

Career statistics
Competition	First-class
Matches	50
Runs scored	1,470
Batting average	20.13
100s/50s	0/8
Top score	80
Balls bowled	42
Wickets	0
Bowling average	–
5 wickets in innings	–
10 wickets in match	–
Best bowling	–
Catches/stumpings	18/–
- Source: CricketArchive, February 2012

Elijah Carrington (25 March 1914 – 19 November 1998) was an English cricketer who played for Derbyshire between 1934 and 1937.

Carrington was born in Blackwell, Derbyshire. He was a miner and a member of Blackwell Miners Welfare Cricket Club. On the annual visit of Derbyshire Cricket Club, coach Sam Cadman spotted the potential of Carrington and two other players and Carrington was taken onto the playing staff of the county side. In 1933 he played for the second XI. He made his first-class debut for Derbyshire during the 1934 season, in a match against Hampshire, when he took a catch and scored 13 in the first innings. He averaged over 20 in his first season, hitting two half-centuries and made his top score of 80 against Worcestershire in 105 minutes. In the 1935 season he made his most frequent appearances and made five half-centuries from the middle-order. In the 1936 and 1937 seasons, Carrington only played in the first half of the seasons, ending in the second XI in 1937. During his first-class career at Derbyshire, the club was never below third place in the County Championship and he contributed to the club's victory in 1936. In 1941, he played two friendly matches

Carrington was a right-handed batsman and played 77 innings in 50 first-class matches with an average of 20.30 and a top score of 80. He bowled 7 overs without taking a first-class wicket.

He spent 1938 as professional with Ayr Cricket Club in Scotland.

Carrington died in Hillcote, Derbyshire.
