= John Gilbert (cricketer, born 1910) =

English cricketer

Personal information
- Full name: John Dudley Harwood Gilbert
- Born: 8 October 1910; Chellaston. Derbyshire, England
- Died: 24 June 1992 (aged 81); Wollaton, England
- Batting: Right-handed

Domestic team information
- Years: Team
- 1930–1936: Derbyshire
- FC debut: 21 June 1930 Derbyshire v Somerset
- Last FC: 9 May 1936 Derbyshire v Oxford University

Career statistics
Competition	First-class
Matches	11
Runs scored	106
Batting average	9.63
100s/50s	0/0
Top score	25
Catches/stumpings	2/–
- Source: CricketArchive, February 2011

John Dudley Harwood Gilbert (8 October 1910 – 24 June 1992) was an English first-class cricketer who played for Derbyshire between 1930 and 1936.

Gilbert was born at Chellaston Manor, Derbyshire and was educated at Repton School. He made his debut for Derbyshire in the 1930 season in June against Somerset but made little impression. He played three more games in the 1930 season, and five in the 1931 season. He then played one game in the 1932 season and one in the 1936 season.

Gilbert was a right-hand batsman and played 11 innings in 11 first-class matches with a top score of 25 and an average of 9.63.

Gilbert died at Wollaton, Nottingham at the age of 81.
