= Harold Pope (cricketer) =

English cricketer

Harold Pope (10 May 1919 — 20 June 2000) was an English cricketer. He was a right-handed batsman and a leg-break bowler who played for Derbyshire in 1939 and 1946.

Pope made his first-class debut just before the outbreak of the Second World War against a team of West Indians, though he was not to make his County Championship debut until the first year the competition was staged following the War.

A lower-order batsman, his frequent bowling attack could not stop Derbyshire from finishing in a lowly position in the 1946 County Championship, and he was to finish with an average for the season of only seven.

Pope's brothers were Test cricketer George, who played for Derbyshire for fifteen years, and Alf Pope, who played first-class cricket for nine years.
