= Thomas Armstrong (Derbyshire cricketer) =

English cricketer (1909–2000)

Personal information
- Full name: Thomas Riley Armstrong
- Born: 13 October 1909; Clay Cross, Derbyshire, England
- Died: 6 February 2000 (aged 90); Leicestershire, England
- Batting: Left-handed
- Bowling: Left-arm slow

Domestic team information
- Years: Team
- 1929–1950: Derbyshire
- FC debut: 8 June 1929 Derbyshire v Worcestershire
- Last FC: 24 June 1950 Derbyshire v Lancashire

Career statistics
Competition	First-class
Matches	58
Runs scored	314
Batting average	6.28
100s/50s	0/0
Top score	28*
Balls bowled	8,308
Wickets	133
Bowling average	24.35
5 wickets in innings	7
10 wickets in match	0
Best bowling	7/36
Catches/stumpings	18/–
- Source: CricketArchive, 7 January 2011

Thomas Riley Armstrong (13 October 1909 – 6 February 2000) was an English cricketer who played first-class cricket for Derbyshire from 1929 to 1950

Armstrong was born at Clay Cross, Derbyshire. He made his debut for Derbyshire in the 1929 season against Worcestershire in June when he bowled without taking a wicket and made 1 run in each innings. That was his only game that year and he only played two games in the 1930 season but took 4 wickets in them. In the 1931 season he began to play more regularly and in the 1932 season managed 5 for 27 against Warwickshire. In the 1933 season he reached a peak with 36 wickets and 7 for 57 against Somerset and 7 for 87 against Northamptonshire. He made his top score of 28 not out against Worcestershire in the 1934 season and took 5 for 72 against Nottinghamshire. In the 1935 season he made just one appearance which was against Lancashire when he took 5 for 13. He only turned out twice in the 1936 Championship winning season and in the match against Somerset at Wells he had Arthur Wellard dropped on one run before Wellard went on to strike him for seven sixes, including five from successive balls. In two games in the 1937 season he took 7 for 36 against Gloucestershire. He did not appear in 1938 and in the 1939 season took no wickets in three matches.

Armstrong was an accountant with Jaguar cars in Coventry and during the war he played a number of miscellaneous games for Coventry. He returned to the Derbyshire side in the 1946 season, another good season when he took 5 for 32 against Yorks. He then played one game in each of his final seasons 1949 and 1950, both against Lancashire. Armstrong was a league professional in the north and midlands, but never won a Derbyshire cap. His last game was with Smethwick in the Birmingham League.

Armstrong was a slow left-arm orthodox bowler and took 133 first-class wickets with an average of 24.35 and a best performance of 7 for 36. He was a left-hand batsman and played 83 innings in 58 first-class matches with a top score of 28 not out and an average of 6.28.

Armstrong died at Marfield Court Nursing Home, Leicestershire at the age of 90.
