= Stanley Walker (cricketer) =

English cricketer

Personal information
- Full name: Stanley George Walker
- Born: 18 May 1908; Pinxton, Derbyshire, England
- Died: 26 November 1993 (aged 85); Edinburgh, Scotland
- Batting: Right-handed
- Bowling: Left-arm medium-fast

Domestic team information
- Years: Team
- 1932: Derbyshire
- Only FC: 27 August 1932 Derbyshire v Leicestershire

Career statistics
Competition	First-class
Matches	1
Runs scored	8
Batting average	4.00
100s/50s	0/0
Top score	7
Balls bowled	18
Wickets	1
Bowling average	6.00
5 wickets in innings	0
10 wickets in match	0
Best bowling	1/6
Catches/stumpings	0/–
- Source: CricketArchive, January 2012

Stanley George Walker (18 May 1908 — 26 November 1993) was an English cricketer. who played first-class cricket for Derbyshire in 1932.

Walker was born in Pinxton, Derbyshire, and attended Pinxton School. He played for Derbyshire in the 1932 season in one match against Leicestershire in August which was a victory for Derbyshire. He was out lbw in both innings on 1 and 7, but took a wicket in three overs bowling for 6 runs. He was a right-handed batsman and a left-arm medium-fast bowler. He became a professional in Scotland at Ferguslie. In 1938 he played two games for Scotland against Australians, and in 1945 two games against the Royal Australian Air Force.

Walker later stood in as an umpire. In 1949 and 1950 he was in Lancashire, but by 1953 was back in Scotland. There, his umpiring between 1953 and 1967 included four first-class matches, most notably when Pakistan played Scotland in 1954.

Walker died at the age of 85 in Edinburgh.
