= Arnold Townsend =

English cricketer

Personal information
- Full name: Arnold Frederick Townsend
- Born: 29 March 1912; Long Eaton, Derbyshire, England
- Died: 27 February 1994 (aged 81); Derby, England
- Batting: Right-handed
- Relatives: Leslie Townsend (brother)

Domestic team information
- Years: Team
- 1934–1950: Derbyshire
- FC debut: 29 August 1934 Derbyshire v Leicestershire
- Last FC: 28 June 1950 Derbyshire v Yorkshire

Career statistics
Competition	First-class
Matches	117
Runs scored	4,327
Batting average	23.13
100s/50s	5/19
Top score	142*
Balls bowled	66
Wickets	0
Bowling average	–
5 wickets in innings	–
10 wickets in match	–
Best bowling	–
Catches/stumpings	30/–
- Source: CricketArchive, 29 June 2010

Arnold Frederick Townsend (29 March 1912 – 27 February 1994) was an English cricketer who played for Derbyshire from 1934 to 1950.

== Career ==
Townsend was born in Long Eaton, Derbyshire. He played his debut game for Derbyshire against Leicestershire in August 1934, which was his only game in the 1934 season when he scored 7 and 0. He played six games in the 1935 season without distinction, often being denied the chance to play a second innings and during Derbyshire's Championship-winning 1936 season he played only twice. He appeared in three games in the 1937 season but in the 1938 season came to the fore playing more matches and hitting two half-centuries. In the 1939 season he played a fuller season and made his top score of 142 not out against Somerset.

Townsend went to South Africa during the war and played one first-class match against a team of South Africans, playing for an Air Force XI. He played for a Derbyshire team in 1945 and when the championship restarted in the 1946 season he became a first-choice batsman. Against Warwickshire, he scored 105 against the economical, penetrating bowling of Test player Eric Hollies. During the 1947 season, Townsend scored 137 against Yorkshire and 102 against Surrey and managed eight half-centuries, and was the most successful Derbyshire batsman during the season. In the 1948 season, he scored 102 not out against Lancashire. In the 1949 season he sustained an eye injury when fielding at short leg and this seriously affected his ability to focus. As a result, he played fewer games in 1949 and in 1950 played only twice before ending his first-class career. In his last three years he was also playing for Derbyshire second XI in the minor counties competition.

Townsend was a right-handed batsman and played 200 innings in 117 first-class matches with an average of 23.13 and a top score of 142 not out. He bowled 11 overs without taking a wicket. Wisden described him as "the epitome of [Derbyshire's] patient watchful batting".

Townsend died in Derby at the age of 81. His brother, Leslie Townsend, was a four-time England Test player, and they played in the same Derbyshire team for six seasons prior to the outbreak of the Second World War.
