= Gilbert Hodgkinson =

English cricketer

Personal information
- Full name: Gilbert Frank Hodgkinson
- Born: 19 February 1913; Derby, England
- Died: 7 January 1987 (aged 73); Mickleover, England
- Batting: Right-handed

Domestic team information
- Years: Team
- 1935–1946: Derbyshire
- FC debut: 29 May 1935 Derbyshire v South Africans
- Last FC: 17 August 1946 Derbyshire v Nottinghamshire

Career statistics
Competition	First-class
Matches	19
Runs scored	472
Batting average	14.75
100s/50s	0/0
Top score	44
Catches/stumpings	10/–
- Source: CricketArchive, 15 February 2010

Gilbert Frank Hodgkinson (19 February 1913 — 7 January 1987) was an English cricketer who played for Derbyshire between 1935 and 1946 and captained the team in 1946.

Hodgkinson was born at Derby, the second son in a family of six children, and educated at Derby School. He ran a family grocery business "Austin Hodgkinson", having as a result little time to spare for the sport. He made his debut for Derbyshire in the 1935 season against the touring South Africans in May. In the match, he made 44 runs including nine fours which came mainly from drives and this was the side's top score in the match and his own career best score. He made two more first-team appearances for the Derbyshire team in 1935 and one in the 1937 season. Otherwise, he played mainly in second team games in the pre-war period.

In World War II Hodgkinson was wounded badly in the head and taken prisoner in 1940. After the war he was captain for the 1946 season at a time when Derbyshire had difficulty finding anyone to commit to the task. He played regularly in the season and Derbyshire ended the season fifteenth in the table. Hodgkinson ended his career with Derbyshire in 1946 but played one game for North Wales in 1947.

Hodgkinson was a right-handed batsman and played 32 innings in 19 first-class matches with an average of 14.75 and a top score of 44. He was considered to be "never anything more than a good club cricketer".

Hodgkinson died at The Pastures, Mickleover, Derbyshire, at the age of 73.

Sporting positions
Preceded by Robin Buckston	Derbyshire cricket captains 1946	Succeeded by Edward Gothard
