= Alan Skinner (cricketer) =

English cricketer

Personal information
- Full name: Alan Frank Skinner
- Born: 22 April 1913; Brighton, Sussex, England
- Died: 28 February 1982 (aged 68); Bury St Edmunds, Suffolk, England
- Batting: Right-handed
- Relatives: David Skinner (brother)

Domestic team information
- Years: Team
- 1931]–1938: Derbyshire
- 1934: Cambridge University
- 1949: Northamptonshire
- 1954–1955: Suffolk
- FC debut: 8 August 1931 Derbyshire v Nottinghamshire
- Last FC: 13 July 1949 Northants v New Zealanders

Career statistics
Competition	First-class
Matches	86
Runs scored	3,537
Batting average	26.20
100s/50s	1/26
Top score	102
Balls bowled	353
Wickets	6
Bowling average	41.66
5 wickets in innings	0
10 wickets in match	0
Best bowling	2/12
Catches/stumpings	60/–
- Source: ESPNCricinfo, 9 July 2010

Alan Frank Skinner OBE (22 April 1913 – 28 February 1982) was an English cricketer who played for first-class cricket for Derbyshire, Cambridge University and Northamptonshire between 1931 and 1949.

== Career ==
Skinner was born at Brighton, Sussex, and educated at The Leys School in Cambridge and the University of Cambridge. He was captain of his school XI and played once for Derbyshire in the 1931 season. He scored 4 as an opening batsman in a match that was abandoned after one day. He played regularly for the county from the 1932 season and made a century in the 1934 season in a match against Gloucestershire. In 1934 he also played two matches for Cambridge University. In the 1935 season he achieved an average of 36.66 but was unable to devote himself full-time to the county. He was a member of the championship winning side in the 1936 season and played his last season for the county in 1938.

During the Second World War, Skinner was Deputy Air Raid Precautions Controller in Nottinghamshire and from 1940 to 1945 played several matches for Nottinghamshire while the County Championship was suspended. In 1946 he was awarded the Order of the British Empire (OBE) for his war services. He played a one-off match for Northamptonshire in 1949.

Skinner was a right-hand batsman who played 142 innings in 86 first-class matches with an average of 26.20 and a top score of 102. As a bowler he took 6 first-class wickets with an average of 41.66 and a best performance of 2 for 12. He was also a fine slip fielder, taking 60 catches in his career and acted as captain for Derbyshire in several matches. Wisden wrote "Though he watched the ball carefully, he was a good stroke-player and could be the most attractive bat on the side".

Skinner played some minor counties games for Nottinghamshire second XI in 1950 and 1951 and for Suffolk in 1954. He was Clerk of the West Suffolk County Council for many years. He died at the West Suffolk Hospital at Bury St Edmunds, Suffolk, at the age of 69.

Skinner's brother David also played for Derbyshire and was captain of the side in 1949.
