= Tommy Mitchell =

English cricketer (1902–1996)

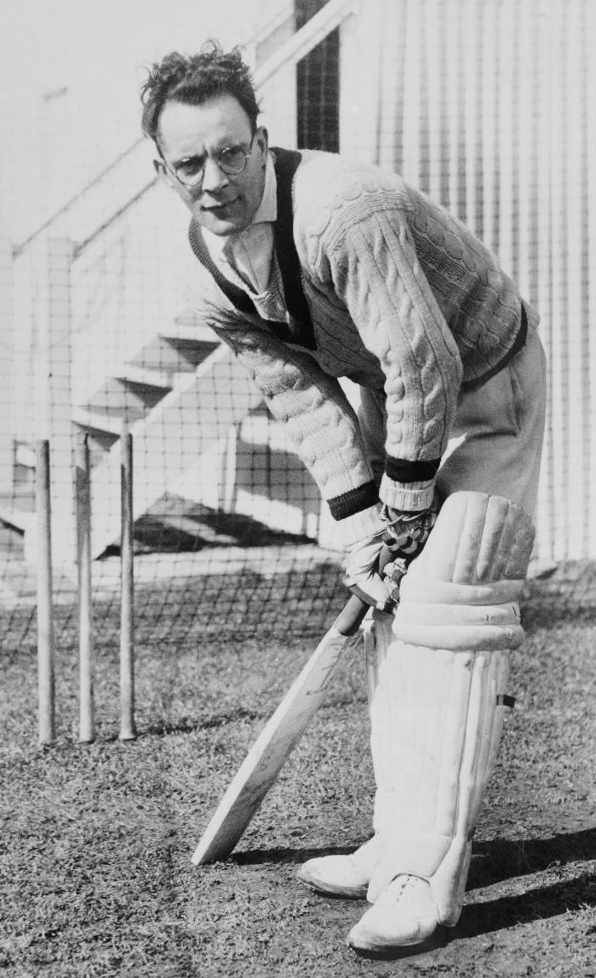
- Mitchell in 1936

Personal information
- Full name: Thomas Bignall Mitchell
- Born: 4 September 1902; Cresswell, Derbyshire, England
- Died: 27 January 1996 (aged 93); Hickleton, Doncaster, England
- Batting: Right-handed
- Bowling: Leg break, googly

International information
- National side: England
- Test debut: 10 February 1933 v Australia
- Last Test: 29 June 1935 v South Africa

Domestic team information
- Years: Team
- 1928–1939: Derbyshire

Career statistics
Competition	Test	First-class
Matches	5	328
Runs scored	20	2,431
Batting average	5.00	7.97
100s/50s	0/0	0/1
Top score	9	57
Balls bowled	894	62,741
Wickets	8	1,483
Bowling average	62.25	20.59
5 wickets in innings	0	118
10 wickets in match	0	30
Best bowling	2/49	10/64
Catches/stumpings	1/–	133/–
- Source: CricketArchive, 19 April 2010

Thomas Bignall Mitchell (4 September 1902 – 27 January 1996) was an English first-class cricketer who played for Derbyshire between 1928 and 1939.

A leg spin bowler, he was the most successful slow bowler in the history of a county better known for its pace bowling strength. His bowling was an important factor in Derbyshire's most successful period in the County Championship during the 1930s. Along with Bill Copson, Leslie Townsend and the brothers Pope, he formed an attack sufficiently strong during the dreadful summer of 1936 to, aided by some quirks in the weather, displace Yorkshire from their perennial position atop the Championship table.

Mitchell was born at Creswell, Bolsover, Derbyshire and was a faceworker in the coal mines. He was first spotted by Derbyshire during the General Strike of 1926 and began playing for Derbyshire in the 1928 season but was disappointing. However, in the 1929 season he took fifty wickets in his first eight matches and was selected for "The Rest" in a Test trial against England, ultimately topping 100 despite a later decline. In the 1930 season, he did even better and was the season's third-highest wicket-taker behind only incomparable county bowlers Tich Freeman and Charlie Parker. In 1931, Mitchell achieved the amazing feat of taking twelve wickets for thirty runs against a strong Sussex eleven – featuring that brilliant player of spin bowling Duleepsinhji at his best – on a pitch too wet to take much spin. Although expensive during the remainder of the 1931 and 1932 seasons, Mitchell's ability to spin the ball on dry pitches more than any other leg-spinner in county cricket saw him taken on the Ashes tour (in preference to the likes of Freeman) when business prevented Walter Robins touring. He played in the Fourth Test as a replacement for Bill Voce who was injured, and despite dismissing Bill Woodfull in both innings he was never able to establish himself for England. Indeed, he was so expensive when called upon in 1934 that he took no wicket and conceded 117 runs, and the following year, when he was very disappointing on a leatherjacket-infested Lord's wicket that should have helped him, he is quoted as having said "You couldn't captain a team of bloody lead soldiers" to his captain Bob Wyatt. Indeed, Mitchell's tactlessness towards administrators made him quite unpopular with them and may have prejudiced his chances of doing well in representative cricket.

However, for Derbyshire Mitchell went from strength to strength in the dry summers of 1933 and 1934, at times bowling with sensational skill, as when he dismissed Worcestershire for 48 on a good pitch in 1934. He was close to the top of the averages in those two seasons, but from the 1935 season appeared to sacrifice length to gain more spin and often suffered heavy punishment. That year, he was offered terms by Lancashire League club Colne, but decided to remain with Derbyshire. Still, he could be deadly on his best days, as when he took all ten wickets in an innings against Leicestershire for 64 runs at Leicester in 1935 or when he took 7 for 26 against Gloucestershire on a blameless pitch at Derby a year later. Mitchell set a record for Derbyshire with 168 wickets in 1935, but in Derbyshire's Championship win in the 1936 season he was considerably less successful and at times very expensive even when conditions favoured bowlers (e.g. against Kent at Burton-on-Trent and Warwickshire at Edgbaston). Still, on Mitchell's good days Derbyshire's bowling that season could compare with almost any county team in history, and the following two seasons still saw him as one of the best spin bowlers in England.

In the 1939 season, however, Mitchell did not do much work because Derbyshire's pace attack was so consistently effective and he failed to take 100 wickets for the first time in eleven seasons. During World War II Mitchell played for Lidget Green in the Bradford League, but when he refused to rejoin Derbyshire due to his engagements in League cricket, the Derbyshire committee declined to give Mitchell the benefit he had been due to receive in 1940. He did, though, continue to baffle batsmen for Hickleton Main well into his fifties.

At his best a master of flight and variety, Mitchell was capable of many more balls than the typical leg-break and googly bowler, perhaps because he learned his art in an unusual way from spinning a billiard ball. Often he would vary his leg-breaks with off-breaks made by turning the wrist in the opposite direction to that of a conventional leg-break or googly, and his top-spinner also brought him many wickets. However, Mitchell, unlike such bowlers as Tich Freeman, was erratic and, especially in his later years, he could have days where he was heaven for batsmen wishing for quick runs. He was never much of a batsman, but was a capable field at cover-point.

When he died at Hickleton, Doncaster, Yorkshire, Mitchell was the oldest surviving English Test cricketer and was surrounded by great-grandchildren, seemingly contented in a way not seen in his days as a player.
