= Charles Clarke (cricketer, born 1910) =

English cricketer

Personal information
- Full name: Charles Cyril Clarke
- Born: 22 December 1910; Burton-on-Trent, Staffordshire, England
- Died: 6 November 1997 (aged 86); Carnforth, England
- Batting: Right-handed

Domestic team information
- Years: Team
- 1929–1933: Derbyshire
- 1947: Sussex
- FC debut: 31 July 1929 Derbyshire v Lancashire
- Last FC: 25 June 1947 Sussex v Oxford University

Career statistics
Competition	First-class
Matches	28
Runs scored	472
Batting average	11.80
100s/50s	0/0
Top score	35*
Catches/stumpings	8/–
- Source: CricketArchive, October 2011

Charles Cyril Clarke (22 December 1910 – 6 November 1997) was an English cricketer who played first-class cricket for Derbyshire from 1929 to 1933 and for Sussex in 1947.

Clarke was born at Burton-on-Trent, Staffordshire. He made his debut for Derbyshire against Lancashire in July 1929, but played little part as the match was abandoned as a draw. He played three more matches that year and for the next four years played about 5 matches in consecutive sets each year, either in May or August. From 1935 until the Second World War, he played minor county cricket for Staffordshire. During the war he played a match for Southern Command against the Royal Army Service Corps. He played in the second XI for Sussex in 1946 and in 1947 played three first-class matches for Sussex in which his batting average was 6.2. Clarke was a right-hand batsman and played 43 innings in 28 first-class matches with an average of 11.80 and a top score of 35 not out.

Clarke moved to Kendal where he played and coached. He earned the nickname "the Conjuror", because he was magic on the field. Later he ran a white-elephant shop.

Clarke died at Carnforth, Lancashire at the age of 86.
