= Leslie Townsend (cricketer) =

English cricketer (1903–1993)

Personal information
- Full name: Leslie Fletcher Townsend
- Born: 8 June 1903; Long Eaton, Derbyshire, England
- Died: 17 February 1993 (aged 89); Nelson, New Zealand
- Batting: Right-handed
- Bowling: Right-arm medium; Right-arm offbreak
- Role: All-rounder
- Relatives: Arnold Townsend (brother)

International information
- National side: England (1930–1934)
- Test debut (cap 254): 21 February 1930 v West Indies
- Last Test: 10 February 1934 v India

Domestic team information
- Years: Team
- 1922–1939: Derbyshire
- 1934/35–1935/36: Auckland
- 1946–1948: Northumberland

Career statistics
Competition	Test	First-class
Matches	4	493
Runs scored	97	19,555
Batting average	16.16	27.50
100s/50s	0/0	22/102
Top score	40	233
Balls bowled	399	65,764
Wickets	6	1,088
Bowling average	34.16	21.12
5 wickets in innings	0	51
10 wickets in match	0	16
Best bowling	2/22	8/26
Catches/stumpings	2/–	241/–
- Source: CricketArchive, 19 April 2010

Leslie Fletcher Townsend (8 June 1903 – 17 February 1993) was an English cricketer who played for England between 1929 and 1934, for Derbyshire between 1922 and 1939, and also for Auckland in 1934–35 and 1935–36.

He was the leading all-rounder for Derbyshire between the wars and at his peak probably the most deadly bowler on a sticky wicket Derbyshire ever produced, owing to his perfect length and ability to turn the ball back from the off. His pace was almost medium and even the most fleet-footed of batsmen could not hit him easily on a bad pitch; however, his lack of flight and variety made him less effective on good pitches. Townsend was also an enterprising middle order batsman, who set a longstanding record for most centuries for Derbyshire in a season in 1933.

== Career for Derbyshire ==
Townsend was born at Long Eaton, Derbyshire. He did not play cricket in his youth and was only attracted to the game by watching Nottinghamshire's star batsman George Gunn. Townsend first played for his native county Derbyshire in the 1922 season and obtained a regular place in the 1924 season.

In the 1925 season Townsend scored over 800 runs at an average of 18. These modest figures, with 59 as his best score, placed Townsend fourth in the county's averages. In the 1926 season after a very slow start Townsend developed as a bowler in August on a number of treacherous pitches. He took 6 for 32 against Nottinghamshire at Ilkeston and 9 for 36 for two innings against Northamptonshire at Chesterfield.

In the 1927 season, with Derbyshire rising to fifth in the Championship, Townsend's medium pace off-break bowling was close to the top of the averages. He took 5 for 29 on a sticky wicket against the formidable Lancashire side and 5 for 42 against Warwickshire. In the 1928 season, his deadliness on sticky wickets was so pronounced he topped the county bowling table with 101 wickets, including 13 against Sussex, and his batting developed so much he edged past 1000 runs with a best score of 98. In the 1929 season, despite only one five-wicket return, he again managed 100 wickets. He was chosen for a second-string tour of the West Indies but did nothing of note.

The 1930s saw Townsend's batting bloom due to improved technique. Having not scored a century before the 1930 season, he hit four alone this year, and after a decline in the 1931 season, did even better as a batsman in the 1932 season. At the same, time, so deadly was his bowling on the many sticky wickets than he was in the top ten of the 1931 national bowling averages and took 117 wickets in 1932. In the 1933 season, Townsend's batting was so successful that he scored over 2,000 runs, including innings of 233 against Leicestershire at Loughborough, 172 not out against Warwickshire at Derby, and 151 against Essex at Leyton. He took 100 wickets for 18.71 each and was second only to Verity in deadliness on the sticky wickets of May and June. His best performances were 9 for 82 against Somerset at Ilkeston, 10 for 54 against Hampshire at Portsmouth and 14 for 90 against Gloucestershire at Chesterfield. However, his limitations on the hard pitches in July and August meant he only reached the rare "double" of 2000 runs and 100 wickets in the last match. Nonetheless, he was named as a Cricketer of the Year by Wisden and toured India, though again meeting with little success. He played in three of the Tests but did not show the skill required.

In the following three years, as Derbyshire attained the greatest heights they ever have in the County Championship. Townsend's bowling declined steadily. By the 1935 season he was rarely given substantial spells of bowling but still could do well on a sticky pitch, as at Edgbaston in the 1936 season when he took twelve Warwickshire wickets. Along with Dennis Smith he was the indispensable backbone of the batting, which was that year still very weak for a champion county. His best score that year was 182 not out against Sussex at Chesterfield. Townsend played a season with Auckland in 1934/1935, and after his batting declined so badly in 1939 that he scored fewer than 700 runs for an average of only 19, Townsend settled in New Zealand permanently.

== Career in New Zealand ==
Townsend went to New Zealand to work as a joiner and cabinet-maker. In 1954 a group of cricket enthusiasts in Nelson asked him to coach there, and he became the driving force behind the development of cricket in the district. Nelson held the Hawke Cup for 28 defences from 1958 to 1965. Most observers during his later years as a coach there saw Townsend as the reason why the city produced an unusual proportion of New Zealand's Test cricketers in the latter part of the twentieth century.

Leslie Townsend died in Nelson in February 1993 at the age of 89.
