= George Pope (cricketer) =

English cricketer

Personal information
- Full name: George Henry Pope
- Born: 27 January 1911; Tibshelf, Derbyshire, England
- Died: 29 October 1993 (aged 82); Chesterfield, Derbyshire, England
- Height: 6 ft 4 in (193 cm)
- Batting: Right-handed
- Bowling: Right-arm fast-medium
- Role: All-rounder
- Relatives: Alf Pope (brother); Harold Pope (brother)

International information
- National side: England
- Only Test: 21 June 1947 v South Africa

Domestic team information
- Years: Team
- 1933–1948: Derbyshire

Career statistics
Competition	Test	First-class
Matches	1	205
Runs scored	8	7,518
Batting average	–	28.05
100s/50s	0/0	8/43
Top score	8*	207*
Balls bowled	218	30,781
Wickets	1	677
Bowling average	85.00	19.92
5 wickets in innings	0	40
10 wickets in match	0	7
Best bowling	1/49	8/38
Catches/stumpings	0/–	157/–
- Source: CricInfo, 19 April 2010

George Henry Pope (27 January 1911 – 29 October 1993) was an English cricketer, who played for Derbyshire from 1933 to 1948, and in one Test for England in 1947.

== Life and career ==
Pope was born at Tibshelf, Derbyshire, and followed his older brother Alf Pope into the Derbyshire side in 1933. He made his debut in an innings victory against Worcestershire and played one more first-class match that season. He became a regular player in 1934 and 1935. In 1936 a cartilage injury early in the season caused him to miss all but a handful of matches in the county's County Championship-winning side. He returned in 1937 and scored more than 1,000 runs with 92 wickets, and toured India with Lord Tennyson's XI in 1937–38.

Pope was Derbyshire's leading all-rounder in both 1938 and 1939, achieving the all-rounder's double of 1,000 runs and 100 wickets in 1938. He played League cricket in 1946, the first season after World War II, but returned to Derbyshire for 1947, when he took 114 wickets. He was back again in 1948, when he completed the second double of his career and made his highest score, an unbeaten 207 against Hampshire at Portsmouth, sharing an unbroken seventh wicket stand of 241 with Dusty Rhodes that remained the county's record until 2000.

Pope's Test career had one false start. In 1938, he was picked in the party for the Trent Bridge match against Australia and then discarded from the final eleven. He did represent England in the Victory series in 1945 taking 5/58 and 3/69 in the second match at Sheffield. Finally, he played in the Lord's Test of 1947 against South Africa, but took only one tail-end wicket and was not selected again.

During the war he worked simultaneously as a travelling dried fruit salesman for the Liverpool-based firm of Leatherbarrow and Company and for the Cuttholme Woodturning Company while continuing to live at Chesterfield, in Shirland Street.

At the end of the 1948 season, Pope announced his immediate retirement to move to the Channel Islands to look after his wife, who was ill. He returned to first-class cricket on the Commonwealth XI tour of India, Pakistan and Ceylon in 1949–50, but at the end of that he retired for good.

Pope was a right hand batsman and played 312 innings in 205 first-class matches, with an average of 28.05. He made eight centuries, with a top score of 207 not out. He was a right-arm fast-medium bowler, and took 677 first-class wickets at average of 19.92, and a best performance of 8 for 38, amongst his forty five wicket hauls.

From 1966 to 1974, Pope stood as a first-class umpire in English county matches, returning for one last match as umpire in 1976.

He died in Chesterfield, Derbyshire, at the age of 82. As well as his elder brother Alf, his younger brother, Harold Pope, also played for Derbyshire.
