= Harry Elliott (English cricketer) =

English cricketer

Personal information
- Full name: Harry Elliott
- Born: 2 November 1891; Scarcliffe, Derbyshire, England
- Died: 2 February 1976 (aged 84); Derby, England
- Batting: Right-handed
- Role: Wicket-keeper
- Relatives: Charlie Elliott (nephew)

International information
- National side: England
- Test debut (cap 234): 4 February 1928 v South Africa
- Last Test: 10 February 1934 v India

Domestic team information
- Years: Team
- 1920–1947: Derbyshire

Career statistics
Competition	Test	First-class
Matches	4	532
Runs scored	61	7580
Batting average	15.25	13.93
100s/50s	0/0	0/11
Top score	37*	94
Catches/stumpings	8/3	903/303
- Source: CricketArchive, 19 April 2010

Harry Elliott (2 November 1891 – 2 February 1976) was an English cricketer who kept wicket for Derbyshire from 1920 to 1947 and for England between 1927 and 1934 and was an international Test umpire.

Elliot was born at Scarcliffe, Derbyshire and became a miner. He played cricket for his local club at Scarcliffe and later at Shirebrook where Derbyshire bowler Billy Bestwick was playing. In 1913 he obtained a job as a groom at Wiseton Hall in North Nottinghamshire, the home of Sir Joseph Laycock, where he looked after the cricket ground and played for Laycock's team. When World War I broke out he joined the artillery battery Laycock commanded, the 1/1st Nottinghamshire Royal Horse Artillery, and was sent to Egypt. After the war Archibald White was playing at Wiseton and was so impressed with Elliott that he sought to recruit him for Yorkshire. However the rule of birthplace prevented this, so he went instead to his native Derbyshire.

Elliott played his first first-class match for Derbyshire against Essex in June 1920. He quickly took over as wicketkeeper from George Beet. He continued playing for Derbyshire every year until 1939, and was a member of the team when the club won the County Championship in 1936. He played in four Tests for England which were against South Africa in 1927/8, against the West Indies in 1928 and twice against India in 1933/4. After the war he played a season for Derbyshire in 1947, sometimes together with his nephew Charlie Elliott. In his 532 first-class games, Elliott claimed 1206 victims - 903 caught, 303 stumped.

Elliott later became an umpire and officiated in seven Tests between 1950 and 1953. His nephew Charlie Elliott was also umpire from 1957 to 1974.

Elliott ran a sports outfitters at Derby where he died at the age of 85.
