= Bill Copson =

English cricketer

Personal information
- Full name: William Henry Copson
- Born: 27 April 1908; Stonebroom, Derbyshire, England
- Died: 14 September 1971 (aged 63); Clay Cross, Derbyshire, England
- Batting: Right-handed
- Bowling: Right-arm fast-medium

International information
- National side: England
- Test debut: 24 June 1939 v West Indies
- Last Test: 16 August 1947 v South Africa

Domestic team information
- Years: Team
- 1932–1950: Derbyshire

Career statistics
Competition	Test	First-class
Matches	3	279
Runs scored	6	1,711
Batting average	6.00	6.81
100s/50s	0/0	0/0
Top score	6	43
Balls bowled	762	50,415
Wickets	15	1094
Bowling average	19.80	18.96
5 wickets in innings	1	66
10 wickets in match	0	6
Best bowling	5/85	8/11
Catches/stumpings	1/–	103/–
- Source: CricketArchive, 19 April 2010

William Henry Copson (27 April 1908 – 14 September 1971) was an English cricketer who played for Derbyshire County Cricket Club between 1932 and 1950, and for England between 1939 and 1947. He took over 1,000 wickets for Derbyshire, and was prominent in their 1936 Championship season. Cricket correspondent, Colin Bateman, noted Copson was, "a flame-haired pace bowler with a temper to match, became a cricketer by accident".

== Life and career ==
Bill Copson was born in Stonebroom, Derbyshire, and became a miner. Like his fellow bowler, Tommy Mitchell, he was a cricketing product of the 1926 General Strike. He took no interest in cricket until the Strike, when some fellow miners persuaded him to join in cricket on the local recreation ground while they were absent from work. His ability as a bowler of considerable pace and exceptional straightness, who made the batsmen play every ball was clearly revealed. In the next season he was given a place in the Morton Colliery team and, from there, he progressed to Clay Cross club in the Derbyshire League, and his success was such that Derbyshire engaged him in 1932.

He made his debut in first-class cricket for Derbyshire against Surrey when he sensationally dismissed Andy Sandham with his first ball. However, his record for the rest of the season was moderate. In 1933, Copson became a regular member of the Derbyshire team, and, if he did not, in spite of his short run-up, possess the build to undertake as much work as fast bowlers were expected to then, he was consistently good in a summer unfavourable to bowlers. In the following two summers, Copson was so plagued by injury that there were serious worries about his long-term health. When he did play he developed so well that he headed Derbyshire's averages in 1935, for a team that recorded more victories than any other Derbyshire team before or since.

Having been sent to Skegness to restore his health, he responded with a marvellous season in 1936. His 12 for 52 against the strong Surrey batting team on an admittedly damaged pitch was his finest feat. In all, he took 140 wickets for less than 13 runs each in the County Championship, and was chosen for the Ashes tour at the end of the season. Though he headed the averages for all matches, Copson's body was not resilient enough for the timeless matches on rock-hard Australian pitches, and he did not play in any of the Tests.

In 1937, Copson suffered more injury problems, but featured one of the most magnificent bowling feats in county cricket history when he took 8 for 11 – including the first performance in first-class cricket of five wickets with six consecutive balls – against Warwickshire on a pitch giving bowlers almost no help. Copson also took 8 for 64 against Sussex on a good pitch, and the following year took 103 wickets, but could not dislodge Farnes and Bowes from the Test team. At last, Copson played his first Test against the West Indies in 1939 at Lord's and did not disappoint, taking nine wickets on a blameless pitch, including five in the first innings. He took 146 wickets that year, but World War II put paid to him being a regular Test bowler. By 1946, he had lost a yard of pace, and, if he could bowl straighter than anyone, he had not the venom of pre-war years. Copson did play one Test in 1947 with almost no success, but retired at the age of 41 in 1949.

Copson was a right-arm fast medium bowler, and took 1,094 first-class wickets at an average of 18.96, with a best performance of 8 for 11. He also took 15 Test wickets. He was a right-hand batsman, and played 359 innings in 279 first-class matches, with an average of 6.81, and a top score of 43.

From 1958 to 1967, Copson was a first-class umpire, but persistent health problems took so much toll, that he died in Clay Cross, Derbyshire, at the age of 63 in 1971.
