= Denis Smith (English cricketer) =

English cricketer

Personal information
- Full name: Denis Smith
- Born: 24 January 1907; Somercotes, Derbyshire, England
- Died: 12 September 1979 (aged 72); Derby, England
- Batting: Left-handed
- Bowling: Right-arm medium
- Role: Batsman

International information
- National side: England
- Test debut: 13 July 1935 v South Africa
- Last Test: 27 July 1935 v South Africa

Domestic team information
- Years: Team
- 1927–1952: Derbyshire

Career statistics
Competition	Test	First-class
Matches	2	443
Runs scored	128	21,843
Batting average	32.00	31.65
100s/50s	0/1	32/116
Top score	57	225
Balls bowled	–	1,516
Wickets	–	20
Bowling average	–	36.70
5 wickets in innings	–	1
10 wickets in match	–	0
Best bowling	–	5/37
Catches/stumpings	1/–	382/5
- Source: CricketArchive, 19 April 2010

Denis Smith (24 January 1907 – 12 September 1979) was an English cricketer who played for Derbyshire between 1927 and 1952 and in two Test matches for England in 1935. He scored more than 21,000 runs in first-class cricket.

Smith was born in Somercotes, Derbyshire on 24 January 1907. He made his debut for Derbyshire in June 1927 against Somerset, when he was out for a duck in the only innings he played and was given a chance to bowl just 10 balls.

A tall left-handed opening batsman who played his strokes, and occasional right-arm medium pace bowler, Smith was the mainstay of Derbyshire's batting line-up during the 1930s, the most successful period in the county's history. Derbyshire came second in the Championship in 1935 and won it in 1936.

Smith played two Test matches against the South Africans in 1935, and took part in the Marylebone Cricket Club cricket team in Australia in 1935–36 (where no tests were played). and did well enough to be considered unlucky not to play more.

Smith played regularly for Derbyshire until 1951, acting as wicket-keeper in 1946 and 1947. In 1952 he became county coach. His career aggregate of runs and his 30 centuries for the county were both Derbyshire records until beaten by Kim Barnett in the 1990s.

Smith was a Wisden Cricketer of the Year in 1936.

Smith died in Derby at the age of 72.
