= Stan Worthington =

English cricketer

Personal information
- Full name: Thomas Stanley Worthington
- Born: 21 August 1905; Bolsover, Derbyshire, England
- Died: 31 August 1973 (aged 68); King's Lynn, Norfolk, England
- Batting: Right-handed
- Bowling: Right-arm fast-medium
- Role: All-rounder

International information
- National side: England
- Test debut: 10 January 1930 v New Zealand
- Last Test: 26 February 1937 v Australia

Domestic team information
- Years: Team
- 1924–1947: Derbyshire
- 1949: Northumberland

Career statistics
Competition	Test	First-class
Matches	9	453
Runs scored	321	19,221
Batting average	29.18	29.07
100s/50s	1/1	31/94
Top score	128	238*
Balls bowled	633	49,020
Wickets	8	682
Bowling average	39.50	29.22
5 wickets in innings	0	16
10 wickets in match	0	2
Best bowling	2/19	8/29
Catches/stumpings	8/–	339/–
- Source: CricketArchive, 19 April 2010

Thomas Stanley Worthington (21 August 1905 – 31 August 1973) was a cricketer who played for Derbyshire between 1923 and 1947 and for England between 1930 and 1937. He was an all-rounder, scoring over 19,000 runs and taking over 600 first-class wickets.

== Career ==
Worthington was born at Bolsover, Derbyshire and went to Netherthorpe Grammar School, Staveley, Derbyshire. He became an electrician with the Bolsover Colliery Company and played for the Colliery Club in the Bassetlaw League. Fred Tate, who was talent-spotting for Derbyshire, saw him and introduced him to the club in 1923.

Worthington played his debut for Derbyshire in August 1924 against Nottinghamshire, his only game that year. He scored a duck in his first innings and 12 in his second, but took four wickets in the match. He played three matches in 1925 and from 1926 played for the full season for the rest of his career.

Worthington was a middle order right-hand batsman and a medium-fast right-arm bowler. In neither role did he often hit the headlines, but his consistency and reliability was big factor in the success that Derbyshire enjoyed through the 1930s. The county, normally one of the weaker English first-class cricket teams, won the County Championship for the only time in its history in 1936, for which each player was awarded with a Gold Watch, engraved with the players name, date and championship title.

Worthington played Test cricket nine times for England, starting with the New Zealand tour in 1929/30. His greatest success was against India in 1936, when he scored 87 at Old Trafford and 128 at The Oval. In the second game, he shared a fourth wicket partnership of 266 with Wally Hammond that remains a record for Tests between England and India. He then toured Australia and New Zealand with Gubby Allen, but an attempt to turn him into an opener was not a success, and he played no more Test cricket.

Worthington with Derbyshire stayed for a couple of seasons after the Second World War and then played Minor counties cricket for Northumberland. He was Lancashire coach in the sixties, nurturing players like Harry Pilling. David Lloyd said he used to coach in a trilby, a cravat and a cigarette holder. Lloyd says “he ruled the place with a rod of iron, he was feared by the players.”

He was a Wisden Cricketer of the Year in 1937.

Worthington died at King's Lynn in 1973.
