= Bowden (surname) =

Surname list

Bowden (pronounced /ˈboʊdən/ or /ˈbaʊdən/) is an English surname of Old English (Anglo-Saxon) origins. In Old English it translates roughly into "dweller by the top of a hill", and is also the name of the towns of Bowden, Ashprington, and Bowden, Yealmpton, in Devon. There is also a village of Great Bowden in rural Leicestershire which was recorded as "Bugedone" in the Domesday Book. Notable people with the surname include:

== A ==
- Adam Bowden (born 1982), British triathlete and runner
- Adrian Bowden (born 1947), Australian rules footballer
- Albert Bowden (1874–1943), Australian cricketer
- Andre Bowden (born 1968), American arena football player
- Andrew Bowden (born 1930), British politician
- Angie Elizabeth Burt Bowden (1860–1952), American writer and clubwoman
- Artemisia Bowden (1879–1969), American school administrator and civil rights activist
- Athel Cornish-Bowden (born 1943), British biochemist
- Athelstan Cornish-Bowden (1871–1942), British land surveyor in South Africa
- Audrey Ellerbee Bowden, American engineer and academic

== B ==
- B. V. Bowden, Baron Bowden (Bertram Vivian Bowden, 1910–1989), English scientist and educationist
- Ben Bowden (born 1994), American baseball player
- Benjamin Bowden (1906–1998), English automobile and bicycle designer
- Billy Bowden (born 1963), New Zealand cricket player and umpire
- Blair Bowden (1916–1981), Australian naval officer
- Bob Bowden (1887–1964), Australian rules footballer
- Bobby Bowden (1929–2021), American college football coach
- Brad Bowden (born 1983), Canadian ice sledge hockey and wheelchair basketball player
- Breck Bowden (born 1951), American environmental scientist
- Brent Bowden (born 1987), American football player

== C ==
- Caspar Bowden (1961–2015), British privacy advocate
- Charles Bowden (1945–2014), American author, journalist and essayist
- Charles Bowden (cricketer) (1860–1909), New Zealand cricketer
- Charles Bowden (criminal) (born 1965), Irish state's witness
- Charles Bowden (politician) (1886–1972), New Zealand politician
- C. E. Bowden (Claude Evelyn Bowden, 1897–1984), British air force officer and aeromodeller
- Craig Bowden (born 1968), American golfer

== D ==
- Daniel Bowden (born 1986), New Zealand rugby union footballer
- David Bowden (1937–2004), Australian Anglican bishop
- Dawn Bowden (born 1960), Welsh trade unionist and politician
- Dewayne Bowden (born 1982), New Zealand cricketer
- Dominic Bowden (born 1977), New Zealand television presenter
- Don Bowden (born 1936), American middle-distance runner
- Doug Bowden (1927–2021), New Zealand cricketer
- Doug Bowden (rowing) (1906–1996), Australian rowing coxswain

== E ==
- Eric Bowden (1871–1931), Australian solicitor and politician
- Ernest Bowden (1892–1972), English cricketer

== F ==
- Francis C. Bowden (1903–1972), American pharmacist and politician from Alaska
- Frank Bowden (footballer) (1904–1934), English footballer
- Frank Bowden (tennis) (1908–1977), American tennis player
- Frank Philip Bowden (1903–1968), Australian physicist
- Frank Prosser Bowden (1860–1934),Australian public servant in Tasmania
- Sir Frank Bowden, 1st Baronet (1848–1921), British businessman, founder of the Raleigh Bicycle Company

== G ==
- George Bowden (Australian politician) (1888–1962), Australian soldier and politician
- George E. Bowden (1852–1908), American politician from Virginia, nephew of Lemuel J. Bowden
- Gerald Bowden (1935–2020), British politician

== H ==
- Harland Bowden (George Robert Harland Bowden, 1873–1927), British politician
- Harold Bowden (1880–1960), British bicycle company executive and baronet, son of Frank
- Harry Bowden (1907–1965), American artist
- Hayley Bowden (born 1984), New Zealand soccer player
- Henrietta Bowden-Jones (born 1964), British psychiatrist and academic
- Herbert Bowden, Baron Aylestone (1905–1994), British politician
- Herbert Bowden (footballer) (1888–1978), Australian rules footballer
- Horace Bowden (1880–1958), Australian politician from South Australia

== J ==
- Jack Bowden (1916–1988), Irish cricketer and field hockey player
- James Bowden (American football) (born 1973), American football player
- James Bowden (footballer) (1880–1951), English footballer
- J. E. T. Bowden (James Edwin Theodore Bowden, 1857–1930), American politician in Florida and Georgia
- Jamie Bowden (diplomat) (born 1960), British diplomat
- Jamie Bowden (footballer) (born 2001), English footballer
- Jeff Bowden (born c. 1961), American college football coach, son of Bobby
- Jim Bowden (baseball) (born 1961), American baseball manager
- Jim Bowden (diver), American technical diver
- Jim Bowden (rugby league) (died c.2003), English rugby league footballer of the 1950s
- Joe Bowden (born 1970), American football player
- Joel Bowden (born 1978), Australian rules footballer and politician
- John Bowden (architect) (died 1822), Irish architect
- John Bowden (banker) (1764–1844), Governor of the Bank of England, 1822–1824
- John Bowden (cricketer) (born 1973), English cricketer
- John Bowden (linguist) (born 1958), Australian linguist
- John Bowden (minister) (died 1750), English Presbyterian minister
- John Bowden (theologian) (1935–2010), English theologian and publisher
- John William Bowden (1798–1844), English functionary and writer on church matters
- Jon Bowden (born 1963), English footballer
- Jonathan Bowden (1962–2012), British political figure
- Jordan Bowden (born 1997), American basketball player
- Joseph Bowden (1884–1958), English cricketer
- Josh Bowden (born 1992), English rugby league footballer

== K ==
- Katrina Bowden (born 1988), American actress
- Ken Bowden (1930–2017), British journalist and golf writer
- Kirsty Bowden (born 1978), British field hockey player

== L ==
- Lemuel J. Bowden (1815–1864), American lawyer and politician from Virginia
- Len Bowden (born 1938), English lawn bowler
- Lilan Bowden (born 1985), American actress and comedian
- Logan Scott-Bowden (1920–2014), British army officer
- Lori Bowden (born 1967), Canadian triathlete
- Lynn Bowden (born 1997), American football player

== M ==
- Maree Bowden (born 1979), New Zealand netball player
- Mark Bowden (born 1951), American writer
- Mark Bowden (composer) (born 1979), British classical composer
- Mark Bowden (English author) (born 1970), body language expert
- Mark Bowden (UN official), British humanitarian and disaster relief worker
- Martin Bowden (1884–1958), American artist
- Mary Scott-Bowden (1893–?), English field hockey and cricket player
- Matt Bowden (born 1971), New Zealand rock musician and activist
- Matthew Bowden (1779–1814), British surgeon
- Max Bowden (born 1994), English actor
- Michael Bowden (baseball) (born 1986), American baseball pitcher
- Michael Bowden (footballer) (1947–2020), Australian rules football player
- Mikhaila Bowden (born 1993), American soccer player
- Mitch Bowden, Canadian indie rock musician
- Monty Bowden (1865–1892), English cricket wicket-keeper
- Murry Bowden (born 1949), American football player
- Mwata Bowden (born 1947), American jazz reeds player

== N ==
- Nathan Bowden (born 1993), Australian rower
- Noel Bowden (1926–2009), New Zealand rugby union footballer
- Norris Bowden (1926–1991), Canadian figure skater

== O ==
- Oswald Bowden (1912–1977), English footballer

== P ==
- Pamela Bowden (1925–2003), English contralto singer
- Patrick Bowden (born 1981), Australian rules footballer
- Peter Bowden (born 2001), American football player
- Phily Bowden (born 1995), British runner

== R ==
- Ray Bowden (1909–1998), English footballer
- Ray Bowden (rugby union) (1903–1969), Australian rugby union footballer
- Reg Bowden (born 1949), English rugby league footballer and coach
- Richard Bowden (born 1945), American country singer, of Pinkard & Bowden
- Ron Bowden (born 1942), Australian politician
- Ruth Bowden (1915–2001), English anatomist

== S ==
- Samuel Bowden (cricketer) (1867–1945), Australian cricketer
- Samuel Bowden (Medal of Honor) (born c.1846), United States Army corporal
- Samuel Bowden (poet) (fl.1733–1761), English physician and poet
- Sandra Bowden (born 1943), American artist
- Scott Bowden (born 1995), Australian mountain biking and road cyclist
- Sean Bowden (born 1970), Australian rules footballer and lawyer
- Steve Bowden (born 1955), Australian rugby league footballer

== T ==
- Terry Bowden (born 1956), American football coach, son of Bobby
- Thomas Adolphus Bowden (1824–1906), New Zealand Anglican cleric
- Thomas Russell Bowden (1841–1893), American Attorney General in Virginia
- Tim Bowden (1937–2024), Australian author, broadcaster and oral historian
- Tim Bowden (baseball) (1891–1949), American baseball player
- Tom Derek Bowden (1921–2019), British Army cavalry officer and parachutist
- Tommy Bowden (born 1954) American college football coach, son of Bobby

== V ==
- Vivian Gordon Bowden (1884–1942), Australian public servant and diplomat
- Vivian Lee Bowden (1943–2017), American science journalist

== W ==
- Walter Bowden (1910–2001), American handball player
- William P. Bowden (born 1932), United States Air Force officer

== Z ==
- Zoë Bowden, British physicist and instrumentation scientist

== See also ==
- Bowden-Smith
- Bowden baronets
- Boden (surname)
