= Samuel Bowden =

Samuel Bowden may refer to:

- Samuel Bowden (poet) (fl.1733–1761), English physician and poet
- Samuel Bowden (cricketer) (1867–1945), Australian cricketer
- Samuel Bowden (Medal of Honor) (born c. 1846), U.S. Army corporal, Medal of Honor recipient
