= James Anderson (Medal of Honor) =

United States Army Medal of Honor recipient

- Born: James Anderson Smythe; May 28, 1849; Canada
- Died: May 31, 1918 (aged 69); St. Louis, Missouri, U.S.
- Burial place: Saints Peter and Paul Catholic Cemetery
- Military career
- Allegiance: United States of America
- Branch: United States Army
- Service years: c. 1870–1880
- Rank: Second Lieutenant
- Unit: 6th U.S. Cavalry
- Conflicts: Indian Wars; Texas–Indian Wars
- Awards: Medal of Honor
- Other work: Stationery engineer

James Anderson (May 28, 1849 – May 31, 1918), born James Anderson Smythe, was a Canadian-born soldier in the U.S. Army who served with the 6th U.S. Cavalry during the Texas–Indian Wars. He was one of six men received the Medal of Honor for gallantry against a hostile band of Plains Indians at the Wichita River in Texas on October 5, 1870.

== Biography ==
James Anderson Smythe was born in Canada on May 28, 1849. He eventually emigrated to the United States and enlisted in the U.S. Army, under the name James Anderson, around 1870. Smythe served with the 6th U.S. Cavalry and assigned frontier duty in Northwestern Texas. On October 5, 1870, he participated in a running battle with hostile Plains Indians at the Wichita River. He and five other men, including Sgt. Michael Welch, Cpl. Samuel Bowden, Cpl. Daniel Keating, Pvt. Benjamin Wilson and Indian guide James B. Doshier, received the Medal of Honor for "gallantry during the pursuit and fight with Indians" a month after what would become known as the "Skirmish at Bluff Creek".

Smythe remained in the army for another ten years, rising to the rank of Second Lieutenant. On November 14, 1880, he married Nellie E. Hanlon and together they moved to St. Louis, Missouri. He worked as stationery engineer for the rest of his life. Smythe's health began to decline in 1917 and he died of pneumonia on May 31, 1918, only three days after his 69th birthday. He was buried at St. Peter and Paul's Cemetery in St. Louis. Smythe was survived by his wife Nellie; the couple had no children.

== Medal of Honor citation ==
Rank and organization: Private, Company M, 6th U.S. Cavalry. Place and date: At Wichita River, Tex., October 5, 1870. Entered service at: ------. Birth: Canada East. Date of issue: November 19, 1870.

Citation:

Gallantry during the pursuit and fight with Indians.

== See also ==
- List of Medal of Honor recipients for the Indian Wars
