= Andrew Pawley =

Australian linguist (1941–2026)

- Born: Andrew Kenneth Pawley; 31 March 1941; Sydney, Australia
- Died: 22 March 2026 (aged 84); Canberra, Australian Capital Territory, Australia
- Occupation: Linguist

Academic work
- Institutions: Australian National University
- Main interests: Papuan languages and Oceanic languages

Andrew Kenneth Pawley FRSNZ, FAHA (31 March 1941 – 22 March 2026) was an Australian–New Zealand linguist and academic who was a professor at the Australian National University.

== Life and career ==
Pawley was born on 31 March 1941 in Sydney, but moved to New Zealand at the age of 12. He was educated at the University of Auckland, gaining a PhD in anthropology in 1966.

His doctoral thesis, The structure of Karam: a grammar of a New Guinea Highlands language, was dedicated to Kalam, a Papuan (Trans–New Guinea) language of Papua New Guinea.

He taught linguistics in the Department of Anthropology, University of Auckland from 1965 to 1989, with periods at the University of Papua New Guinea (1969) and the University of Hawaii (1973 to 1978). He moved to the Australian National University in 1990. He taught at the Linguistic Society of America's Summer Institute in 1977 and 1985. Pawley took sabbaticals at Berkeley (1983), Frankfurt (1994) and Max Planck Institute for Evolutionary Anthropology, Leipzig (2001). After he retired in the early 2010's, he was Professor Emeritus at Australian National University's College of Asia and the Pacific until his death.

Pawley wrote about his own career in an autobiographical text published in 2018.

He died on 22 March 2026, at the age of 84.

== Research ==
Pawley's research interests included Austronesian and Papuan languages and cultures, the prehistory of Pacific Island peoples, folk taxonomies and ethnobiology, lexicography, phraseology, and idiomaticity.

He completed dictionaries of Wayan (an Oceanic language of Western Fiji); and of Kalam (a Papuan language of Papua New Guinea), in collaboration with Ian Saem Majnep.

After the mid-1990s, he collaborated with Malcolm Ross and Meredith Osmond on the Oceanic Lexicon Project, an encyclopedic series using lexical comparisons to reconstruct the culture and environment of Proto-Oceanic speakers. Six volumes were published, in 1998, 2003, 2008, 2011, 2016, and 2023.

== Key publications ==
Between 1960 and 2010, Andrew Pawley published 196 academic publications:

- 21 publications on Polynesian languages and culture history,
- 14 on Fijian and Rotuman languages,
- 53 on Austronesian, especially Oceanic, languages and their culture history,
- 29 on Papuan languages, including 19 on Kalam.
- 44 on varieties of English, discourse and pragmatics,
- 35 on miscellaneous topics.

Among these, some of the most important ones include:

- Pawley, Andrew. 1966. Samoan Phrase Structure: the Morphology-Syntax of a Western Polynesian Language. Bloomington: Indiana University Archives of Languages of the World, 1966.
- Pawley, Andrew (with Malcolm Ross and Meredith Osmond, eds.) The Lexicon of Proto Oceanic: The culture and environment of ancestral Oceanic society (5 volumes). Canberra: Pacific Linguistics.
- Pawley, Andrew (with Ralph Bulmer, with the assistance of John Kias, Simon Peter Gi and Ian Saem Majnep). 2011. A dictionary of Kalam with ethnographic notes. Canberra: Pacific Linguistics.

== Notes and references ==
=== References ===
- Bowden, John; Himmelmann, Nikolaus; Ross, Malcolm D., eds. (2010). A journey through Austronesian and Papuan linguistic and cultural space: Papers in honour of Andrew Pawley. Pacific linguistics. Canberra: Pacific Linguistics. ISBN 978-0-85883-620-4.
- Pawley, Andrew (2018). "Memoirs of an anthropological linguist" (PDF). Te Reo, the Journal of the Linguistic Society of New Zealand. 61 (2): 95–113.

=== External links ===
- "Prof Andrew Pawley's academic profile". Australian National University. 2024. Archived from the original on 6 June 2024.
- Darja Hoenigman (25 April 2026). "Vale, Emeritus Professor Andrew Kenneth Pawley FAHA FRSNZ (1941–2026)". School of Culture, History & Language – Australian National University.
