= Vivian Bowden =

Vivian Bowden may refer to:

- Vivian Gordon Bowden (1884–1942), Australian public servant and diplomat
- Vivian Lee Bowden (1943–2017), American science journalist
- B. V. Bowden, Baron Bowden (1910–1989), known as Vivian, English scientist and educationist
