= Daniel Keating =

Daniel Keating may refer to:

- Dan Keating (1902–2007), Irish republican
- Daniel Keating (Medal of Honor) (1846–1912)
- Daniel Keating, character in NCIS (season 6)

== See also ==
- Daniel Keatings (born 1990), British artistic gymnast
