= Ethnoornithology =

Ethnoornithology (also ethno-ornithology) is the study of the relationship between people and birds (from "ethno-" - relating to people and culture - and "ornithology" - the study of birds). It is a branch of ethnozoology and so of the wider field of ethnobiology. Ethnoornithology is an interdisciplinary subject and combines anthropological, cognitive and linguistic perspectives with natural scientific approaches to the description and interpretation of people's knowledge and use of birds. Like ethnoscience and other cognate terms, "ethnoornithology" is sometimes used narrowly to refer to people's practice rather than the study of that practice. The broader focus is on how birds are perceived, used and managed in human societies, including their use for food, medicine and personal adornment, as well as their use in divination and ritual. Applied ethnoornithological research is also starting to play an increasingly important role in the development of conservation initiatives.

== History ==
The work of Ralph Bulmer in New Guinea culminated in his collaboration with Ian Saem Majnep in writing Birds of My Kalam Country (1977), which has become a classic of modern ethno-ornithology.

== Ethnoornithology and conservation ==
Like other branches of ethnozoology, ethnoornithology has been long undervalued as a resource for conservation, though this is now beginning to change. Mark Bonta's Seven Names for the Bellbird (2003), which highlights the importance of local traditions and practices relating to birds for the future of biodiversity conservation in Honduras, and Ricardo Rozzi's Multi-ethnic Bird Guide of the Subantarctic Forests of South America (2003), which focuses on the integration of traditional ornithological knowledge and environmental ethics in southern Chile, provide good examples of this trend. Soma (2015) pointed out that ethnoornithological knowledge of falconers contributes to conservation for local avifauna (especially focusing on Kazakh eagle masters). This realisation is the basis for founding the Ethno-ornithology World Archive (EWA), a collaborative project between Oxford University (linking the Department of Zoology and School of Anthropology and Museum Ethnography) and BirdLife International.

== Professional associations ==
The Society of Ethnobiology, which publishes the Journal of Ethnobiology, provides a general forum for ethnobiological - including ethnoornithological - research. In January 2006, the Ethnoornithology Research & Study Group (ERSG) was established "to provide a clearinghouse, information source and discussion point for people interested in the study of, research about and application of indigenous bird knowledge".
