= John Bowden =

John Bowden may refer to:

- John Bowden (minister) (died 1750), English Presbyterian minister
- John Bowden (banker) (1764–1844), Governor of the Bank of England, 1822–1824
- John Bowden (architect) (died 1822), Irish architect
- John William Bowden (1798–1844), English functionary and writer on church matters
- Jack Bowden (1916-1988), Irish cricketer and field hockey player
- Jack Bowden (footballer) (1921-1981), English footballer, see List of Oldham Athletic A.F.C. players (25–99 appearances)
- John Bowden (theologian) (1935–2010), English theologian and publisher
- John Bowden (linguist) (born 1958), Australian linguist
- John Bowden (cricketer) (born 1973), English cricketer

== See also ==
- Jon Bowden
- Jonathan Bowden
