= Bowder =

Bowder is a surname. Notable people with the surname include:

- Bill Bowder, Irish Anglican priest and journalist
- Irene Bowder Peacock (née Bowder; 1892–1978), South African tennis player
- James Bowder, British Army officer

== See also ==
- Bowder Stone
- Bowden (surname)
