= Fullwood =

Fullwood is a surname. Notable people with the surname include:

== People ==
- Albert Henry Fullwood (1863–1930), Australian official war artist in the First World War
- Bill Fullwood (1910–2005), Australian artist
- Brent Fullwood (b. 1963), American football player
- Bryce Fullwood (b. 1998), Australian racing driver
- Francis Fullwood (died 1693), Archdeacon of Totnes
- Harold Fullwood (1920–1993), city judge, St. Louis, Missouri
- James Fullwood (1911–1981), English footballer
- Reggie Fullwood (1975), Democratic member of the Florida House of Representatives
- Walter Fullwood (1907–1988), English cricketer

== Fictional characters ==
- Lyn Fullwood, a character in the British soap opera Coronation Street

== See also ==
- Fulwood (disambiguation)
