= Jonathan Bowden (disambiguation) =

Jonathan Bowden may refer to:

- Jonathan Bowden (born 1962), English political activist
- Jon Bowden (born 1963), English footballer

== See also ==
- John Bowden (disambiguation)
