= James Dozier =

James Dozier may refer to:

- James B. Dozier (1820–1901), scout during the Indian Wars and civilian Medal of Honor recipient
- James C. Dozier (1885–1974), United States Army general and Medal of Honor recipient
- James L. Dozier (born 1931), United States Army general
