= Daniel Keating (Medal of Honor) =

- Born: 1846; County Cork, Ireland
- Died: June 20, 1912 (aged 65–66)
- Burial place: Malden, Massachusetts
- Military career
- Allegiance: United States
- Branch: United States Army
- Rank: Corporal
- Unit: 6th Cavalry Regiment
- Conflicts: American Indian Wars
- Awards: Medal of Honor

Daniel Keating (1846 – June 20, 1912) was a United States Army soldier who received the U.S. military's highest decoration, the Medal of Honor, for his actions in the Indian Wars of the western United States.

== Biography ==
Keating was born in 1846 in County Cork, Ireland. He served during the Indian Wars as a corporal in Company M of the 6th Cavalry Regiment. During a pursuit of Native Americans at the Wichita River in Texas on October 5, 1870, Keating showed "[g]allantry in action." He was awarded the Medal of Honor a month later, on November 19, 1870. Five other men also received the medal for this action: Sergeant Michael Welch, Corporal Samuel Bowden, Private James Anderson, Private Benjamin Wilson, and civilian guide James B. Doshier.

Keating's official Medal of Honor citation reads:

Gallantry in action and in pursuit of Indians.

Keating died on June 20, 1912, at age 65 or 66 and was buried in Malden, Massachusetts.
