= IGSP =

IGSP may refer to:

- Influenza Genome Sequencing Project, a project seeking investigate influenza evolution
- Duke University Institute for Genome Sciences and Policy, an institution at Duke University
