= Thomas Amory (tutor) =

British dissenting cleric (1701–1774)

Thomas Amory D.D. (28 January 1701 – 24 June 1774) was a British dissenting tutor and minister and poet from Taunton.

== Biography ==
His father was a grocer and his mother a sister of Henry Grove. He was at school under Chadwick, a local dissenting minister, and learned French at Exeter under André de Majendie, a refugee minister. On 25 March 1717 he entered, as a divinity student, the Taunton Academy, then the chief seat of culture for the dissenters of the west, under Stephen James of Fullwood, who taught theology, and Henry Grove, who taught philosophy. He received his testimonials for the ministry in 1722, and then went to London to study experimental physics in the academy of John Eames in Moorfields. In 1725, on Stephen James's death and before his own ordination, he acted as assistant in the ministry to Robert Darch, at Hull Bishops, and in the Taunton Academy to Grove. He was ordained 3 October 1730 as colleague to Edmund Batson at Paul's Meeting, Taunton. Batson was more conservative in theology than Amory, and was unwilling to divide the stipend; hence, in 1732, Amory's friends seceded and built him a new meeting-house in Tancred Street. On Grove's death in 1738 Amory was placed at the head of the academy.

A list of his students is given in the Monthly Repository, 1818; there were more men of mark under Grove; Amory's best pupils were Thomas and John Wright of Bristol. In 1741 he married Mary, daughter of the Rev. S. Baker of Southwark. By her he had five children, four of whom survived him. He moved to London in October 1759 to become afternoon preacher at the Old Jewry meeting-house, and in 1766 succeeded Samuel Chandler as co-pastor of the congregation with Nathaniel White. He was elected one of Daniel Williams's trustees in 1767 (his portrait is in Dr. Williams's Library). He received the degree of D.D. Edin. in 1768, and was Tuesday lecturer at Salters' Hall from 1768, and morning preacher at Newington Green, as colleague with Dr. Richard Price, from 1770, in addition to his other duties. Though thus full of preaching engagements, he was not so popular in London as he had been in Taunton. His theology, of the Clarkean type, was not conservative enough for the bulk of the London presbyterians of that day. His style was dry and disquisitional; his manner wanting in animation. But he was a leader of the dissenting liberals, and in 1772 a strenuous supporter of the agitation for a removal of the subscription to the doctrinal articles of the established church, till 1779 demanded of all dissenting ministers by the Toleration Act. Amory, like many others, had in point of fact never subscribed, and he had to combat the opposition of his friends, who thought, with Joseph Priestley, that a subscription not rigidly enforced was better than a new declaration (that they received the Scriptures as containing a divine revelation), which might be pressed in the interests of intolerance. Amory did not live to see the bill for this new declaration pass, after being twice rejected by the Lords.

He died on 24 June 1774, and was buried in the hallowed ground of dissent at Bunhill Fields. The inscription on his tomb speaks of him as 'having been employed for more than fifty years in humbly endeavouring to discover the religion of Jesus Christ in its origin and purity.'

== Bibliography ==
- 1710 - Thomas Amory, Esq; administrator to Katherine Amory, ... appellant. Henry Luttrell, ... respondent. Et e contra. The appellants case
- 1735 - Christ the light of the world; or, the principal improvements made in religion by Christianity. Represented in a sermon preached at the young men's lecture at Exon, Thursday, September 11, 1735
- 1738 - The character and blessedness of those to whom to live is Christ, and to die gain: represented in a sermon preach'd at Ilmister, Somerset, May 25, 1738. on occasion of the much- lamented death of the late Rev. Mr. James Strong, who died May 21. ...
- 1741 - The nature of sound doctrine, and the encouragements to preach it; represented in a charge delivered at the ordination of the Rev. Mr. William Harris, ...
- 1743 - Self-dedication to God explained and recommended, with a particular view to the new-year; and a prefatory address to youth
- 1746 - A dialogue on devotion, after the manner of Xenophon; in which the reasonableness, pleasure and advantages of it are considered. To which is prefixed, a conversation of Socrates on the being and providence of God. Translated from the Greek
- 1748 - Eight sermons on a future general judgment
- 1749 - The character and blessedness of those who die in the Lord; represented in a sermon preached at Bridgewater, January 6th. 1748; on occasion of the death of the Reverend Mr. John Moore, M.A. who departed this life December 31. ...
- 1751 - Ministers not lords over the faith of Christians, but helpers of their joy. A sermon preached at Lewin's-Mead, Bristol, at the ordination of the Reverend Mr. William Richards, May the 22d. 1751
- 1752 - Our times in the hand of God. A sermon preached at Culliton, March 8th. 1752. on occasion of the death of Mrs. Mary Slater, ... who died March 2d in the 30th year of her age
- 1754 - The shortness and frailty of human life. Represented and accounted for, in a sermon preached on occasion of the death of John Halliday, Esq; who died June 9, 1754, ...
- 1758 - Sermons on the following subjects, viz. On the reasonableness of religion. ... On the character and blessedness of those who die in the Lord
- 1759 - Habitual religion explained and recommended, in three sermons, preached at Taunton, September 1759
- 1766 - Dying in faith explained, and the happiness attending it, represented in a sermon on Heb. xi. 13. preached at the Old Jewry, May 18, 1766; on occasion of the death of the Rev. Sam. Chandler, ...
- 1775 - Sermons on the following subjects; viz. The divine omnipresence. ... God's crowning the year with his goodness
- 1770 - Daily devotion assisted and recommended, in four sermons; representing the principal instances of the providence and goodness of God, ...
- 1772 -Daily devotion assisted and recommended, in four sermons; representing the principal instances of the providence and goodness of God, which every morning and every evening offer to our thoughts; and the use we should make of them

== Other Works ==
Andrew Kippis gives a list of his twenty-seven publications, including prefaces and single sermons. His maiden effort was a 'Poem on Taunton,' 1724. He wrote the life and edited the works of Grove, 1745; prefixed a memoir of the author to Dr. George Benson's 'Life of Jesus Christ,' 1764; and edited Chandler's posthumous sermons, with memoir, 1768.
