= Ralph Bulmer =

English ethnobiologist (1928-1988)

- Born: Ralph Neville Hermon Bulmer; April 3, 1928; Hereford, United Kingdom
- Died: July 18, 1988 (aged 60)
- Spouse(s): Ellaine Bruce; Susan Bulmer; Lena Lane

Academic background
- Education: University of Cambridge
- Alma mater: Australian National University

Academic work
- Discipline: Anthropology; Linguistics; Ethnobiology
- Sub-discipline: Papuan linguistics

Ralph Neville Hermon Bulmer (3 April 1928 – 18 July 1988) was a twentieth-century ethnobiologist who worked in Papua New Guinea, particularly with the Kalam people. From 1974 he made a radical shift by changing the role of his Kalam informants and collaborators, allowing them to shape the purpose of ethnography and to make them authors rather than consultants. Bulmer's tree frog (Ranoidea bulmeri) is named after him.

== Early life ==
Ralph (pronounced "Rafe") Bulmer was born in Hereford, the eldest of three children of Kenneth, who worked at the National Westminster Bank, and his wife Dorothy. Dorothy's father was an archaeologist and Kenneth was interested in nature.

== Education ==
Bulmer was educated at Christ's Hospital, Sussex and served in the army from 1947 to 1949. Bulmer received a scholarship to study at Clare College, University of Cambridge and initially intended to study zoology but shifted to study anthropology, receiving a BA in 1953. His teachers included Desmond Clark. Along with a few other fellow students, he studied Sami herders in Sweden and Norway under Ethel-John Lindgren who was married to Mikel Utsi, a Sami. His report was submitted to the University of Tromsø.

He received a doctoral scholarship and pursued his Ph.D. at Australian National University (1962). His doctorate was based on field-work in the Western Highlands of Papua New Guinea, where he documented the social and political life of the Kyaka-Enga people in the Baiyer Valley.

== Career ==
Bulmer was the Senior Lecturer of Social Anthropology at the University of Auckland from 1958 until 1967, after which he was the Professor of Social Anthropology at the University of Papua New Guinea from 1968 until 1973. He returned to the University of Auckland in the early 1970s.

In 1964, Bulmer began to study the Kalam people along with Bruce Biggs, and in 1968 he moved to Port Moresby, working as a professor of anthropology at the University of Papua New Guinea. Along with a Kalam hunter and naturalist, Ian Saem Majnep (whom he made the primary author in publications), he wrote several books starting with Birds of My Kalam Country (1977). His later work, as lecturer in Social Anthropology at the University of Auckland, was pioneering in the field of Ethnobiology, particularly documenting the Kalam people. Among his well-known works was on ethnozoological classification and a particularly well known paper was titled "Why is the Cassowary Not a Bird? A Problem of Zoological Taxonomy Among the Karam of the New Guinea Highlands".

== Personal life ==
Bulmer's first marriage was to a fellow student at Cambridge, Ellaine Bruce. After a divorce he married archaeologist Susan Hirsh (Sue Bulmer) in 1959. After another divorce in 1980, he married Lena Lane in 1983.

He was diagnosed with cancer in 1988 and died the same year. He was buried at Manukau Harbour, New Zealand. A memorial volume was published, Man and a Half: Essays in Pacific Anthropology and Ethnobiology in Honour of Ralph Bulmer, edited by Andrew Pawley (University of Hawaii Press, 1993).

== Writings ==
Bulmer is best known for his collaborations with Ian Saem Majnep:

- Birds of My Kalam Country (1977).
- Kalam Hunting Traditions in 6 parts (1990).
- Animals the Ancestors Hunted, edited by Robin Hide and Andrew Pawley (2007).

Towards the end of his life, Bulmer also considered biblical ethnoornithology, leading to the publication of The Unsolved Problems of the Birds of Leviticus (1986).
