= Bulmer's tree frog =

Conservation status
- Least Concern (IUCN 3.1)

Scientific classification
- Kingdom: Animalia
- Phylum: Chordata
- Class: Amphibia
- Order: Anura
- Family: Pelodryadidae
- Genus: Amnihyla
- Species: A. bulmeri

Binomial name
- Amnihyla bulmeri (Tyler, 1968)

Synonyms
- Litoria bulmeri (Tyler, 1968); Ranoidea bulmeri (Tyler, 1968)

Species of amphibian

Bulmer's tree frog (Amnihyla bulmeri) is a species of frog in the subfamily Pelodryadinae. It is found in Papua New Guinea and possibly West Papua in Indonesia. Its natural habitats are subtropical or tropical moist montane forests and rivers. The frog is named after Ralph Bulmer, an anthropologist who studied the Kalam language, people, and culture of Papua New Guinea.
