= John Ashwood =

John Ashwood (1657–1706) was an English Nonconformist minister and author in the 16th-17th century.

== Life ==
Ashwood was born in Axminster in 1657. In his youth he was extremely delicate. He was educated by his father, Bartholomew Ashwood, and admitted "as a member of his father's church." Soon after he was sent to London, where he was received into the family of the learned Theophilus Gale, who acted as his instructor. Before he began to preach he taught a school at Axminster, and afterwards at Chard, Somerset. Driven from Chard as a conscience-ruled Nonconformist by high-church intolerance, he decided with some friends to emigrate to Carolina in January 1683; but was prevented by a sudden attack of smallpox.

He then appears to have resided successively at Ilminster, Haveland, and Buckland, until he received a call to Exeter, where he was a minister for about ten years. He subsequently returned to London. For about two years he was evening lecturer at Spitalfields, and morning preacher at Hoxton, when he received a call from a congregation at Peckham, Surrey. He died there on 22 September 1706.

== Works ==
His Life was for long a favourite fireside companion among devout Nonconformists, circulating as a chap-book, Some Account of the Life, Character, and Death of the Rev. Mr. John Ashwood, by Thomas Reynolds (1707). Added to the Account are two sermons preached shortly before he died.
