= John Rowe (minister) =

English clergyman

John Rowe (1626–1677) was an English clergyman, minister to an important Congregationalist church in London.

== Biography ==
He was born in Crediton, Devon. He was educated at Emmanuel College, Cambridge and Oxford, where he attended New Inn Hall.

His 1653 book Tragi-comoedia took an incident in his parish of Witney as a judgement on those attending dramatic productions. The floor of an upper room of The White Hart Inn collapsed during a performance by travelling players of Mucedorus.

In 1654 he was appointed lecturer to Westminster Abbey. In October 1656 he preached to Parliament, then giving thanks for a naval victory in the Caribbean. In 1659 at the State Funeral of John Bradshaw, the President of the Court that had condemned Charles I, he gave the eulogy. However, he was displaced from his position by the Restoration of 1660, and in 1662 refused to conform, losing his status and being ejected as Anglican minister.

After some moves, he established a church in Holborn, London, where he was assisted by Theophilus Gale.

Thomas Rowe (1657–1705) was his son. He took over the church after Gale’s death, and moved it to Girdlers’ Hall, which opened in 1681 in Basinghall Street. It had Isaac Watts in its congregation. Henry Grove, friend of Watts, was Rowe’s nephew.

== Further information ==
- Gordon, Alexander (1897). "Rowe, John (1626-1677)" . In Lee, Sidney (ed.). Dictionary of National Biography. Vol. 49. London: Smith, Elder & Co. pp. 340–341.
