= John Ball (minister) =

English presbyterian minister

John Ball (1665?–1745), was an English presbyterian minister.

== Life ==
Ball was one of ten sons of Nathanael Ball, M.A. ejected from Barley, Hertfordshire. He was educated for the ministry under the Rev. John Short at Lyme Regis, Dorset, and finished his studies at Utrecht, partly under Henry Hickman, ejected fellow of Magdalen College, Oxford, who died minister of the English church at Utrecht in 1692. He was ordained 23 January 1695, and became minister in 1705 of the presbyterian congregation at Honiton (extinct 1788), where he united two opposing sections, and ministered for forty years, being succeeded by John Rutter (d. 1769).

He was a serious scholar, and ‘carried the Hebrew psalter into the pulpit to expound from it.’ His learning and high character meant that a nonconformist seminary, which he opened before the Toleration Act, was connived at, and attended by the sons of neighbouring Anglican gentry. Ball is notable for retaining the puritan style of divinity unimpaired to a late period. He had no sympathy with any of the innovations in Calvinism.

He died 6 May 1745, in his ninety-first year.

== Works ==
He published:

- ‘The Importance of Right Apprehensions of God with respect to Religion and Virtue,’ Lond. 1736.
- ‘Some Remarks on a New Way of Preaching,’ 1737; this was answered by Henry Grove, the leader of a more moderate school of presbyterian liberalism.
