= Derbyshire County Cricket Club in 1946 =

1946 season of an English cricket team

Derbyshire County Cricket Club seasons
1946 season
- Captain: Gilbert Hodgkinson
- County Championship: 15
- Most runs: Denis Smith
- Most wickets: Cliff Gladwin

Derbyshire County Cricket Club in 1946 represents the first cricket season after a six-year break from first class cricket during World War II. The English club Derbyshire had been playing for seventy five years. It was their forty-second season in the County Championship and they won five matches and lost thirteen to finish fifteenth (two from bottom) in the County Championship.

== 1946 season ==
On the resumption of county cricket after the Second World War in 1946 the main problem affecting Derbyshire was that of finding a regular captain. The convention was that the captain be an amateur and usually no one was available for more than one year. Gilbert Hodgkinson filled the role in 1946 and they made a poor re-entry to the County Championship .

Wisden Cricketers' Almanack (1947 edition), in its review of the 1946 season, remarked that "the weather in 1946 might have been dreadful, but it didn't stop the crowds flocking to games".

Derbyshire began their season with a tour of Ireland. They played 26 games in the County Championship, and one match against the touring Indians. They won five matches altogether, and these wins came in a bright patch in the middle of the season. Denis Smith was top scorer and Cliff Gladwin took most wickets with 102. Pat Vaulkhard and Denis Smith's 4th wicket partnership of 328 against Nottinghamshire remains a record for the county.

The club retained a nucleus of pre-war players, and Pat Vaulkhard, a future captain, had previously played for Nottinghamshire. Alan Revill, Eric Marsh, John Eggar and Roy Genders all began their first-class career during the season, although some had already played for the club in miscellaneous matches during the war. England footballer Raich Carter turned out for Derbyshire at cricket. However newcomers Walter Fullwood and Jack Pearson did not play beyond the end of the season, and John Tomlinson only played one match for the club in 1946.

=== Matches ===
List of matches
No.	Date	V	Result	Margin	Notes
1	15 May 1946	Leicestershire; County Ground, Derby	Lost	7 wickets	T S Worthington 147; Berry 121; Watson 108; Walsh 5-45
2	18 May 1946	Essex; Valentine's Park, Ilford	Lost	8 wickets	Pearce 124; CS Elliott 120; T Smith 5-34
3	25 May 1946	Kent; Queen's Park, Chesterfield	Drawn		W H Copson 5-26
4	29 May 1946	Hampshire; Queen's Park, Chesterfield	Lost	7 wickets	Dean 7-51
5	01 Jun 1946	Middlesex; Lord's Cricket Ground, St John's Wood	Drawn		
6	08 Jun 1946	Warwickshire; County Ground, Derby	Drawn		C Gladwin 7-41
7	12 Jun 1946	Worcestershire; Amblecote, Stourbridge	Lost	Innings and 2 runs	P Jackson 5-29 and 5-57
8	15 Jun 1946	Northamptonshire; County Ground, Northampton	Drawn		C Gladwin 5-45
9	19 Jun 1946	Surrey; Kennington Oval	Drawn		Watts 6-31
10	22 Jun 1946	Lancashire; Park Road Ground, Buxton	Lost	Innings and 110 runs	C Gladwin 6-62; Garlick 6-27
11	29 Jun 1946	Yorkshire; Queen's Park, Chesterfield	Lost	4 wickets	W Bowes 5-56; T R Armstrong 5-32
12	03 Jul 1946	Surrey; County Ground, Derby	Won	2 wickets	D Smith 140; L Fishlock 151; Bedser 5-65
13	06 Jul 1946	Leicestershire; Bath Grounds, Ashby-de-la-Zouch	Lost	162 runs	V Jackson 5-43
14	10 Jul 1946	Indian cricket team in England in 1946; Queen's Park, Chesterfield	Lost	118 runs	Nawab of Pataudi 113; AEG Rhodes 5-135
15	13 Jul 1946	Lancashire; Old Trafford, Manchester	Lost	9 wickets	Pollard 5-78; C Gladwin 7-108
16	20 Jul 1946	Sussex; Abbeydale Park, Sheffield	Won	2 wickets	C Gladwin 5-50; W H Copson 6-49
17	24 Jul 1946	Hampshire; At County Ground, Southampton	Won	6 wickets	Hill 100; A E Alderman 101; C Gladwin 6-39
18	27 Jul 1946	Nottinghamshire; Rutland Recreation Ground, Ilkeston	Drawn		Harris 122; Voce 114 and 5-92;
19	31 Jul 1946	Glamorgan; Queen's Park, Chesterfield	Won	Innings and 21 runs	W H Copson 5-29; AEG Rhodes 5-35
20	03 Aug 1946	Warwickshire; Edgbaston, Birmingham	Won	5 wickets	Dollery 113; A F Townsend 105; Hollies 6-94; AEG Rhodes 5-86
21	07 Aug 1946	Glamorgan; Cardiff Arms Park	Lost	Innings and 115 runs	Robinson 117; AEG Rhodes 7-109; Judge 7-23
22	10 Aug 1946	Worcestershire; Queen's Park, Chesterfield	Abandoned		
23	14 Aug 1946	Northamptonshire; County Ground, Derby	Lost	7 wickets	W H Copson 5-68
24	17 Aug 1946	Nottinghamshire; Trent Bridge, Nottingham	Drawn		P Vaulkhard 264; D Smith 146; C Gladwin 5-58
25	21 Aug 1946	Kent; Crabble Athletic Ground, Dover	Lost	8 wickets	Wright 6-39
26	24 Aug 1946	Gloucestershire; County Ground, Derby	Lost	81 runs	S Cook 6-54
27	28 Aug 1946	Somerset; Agricultural Showgrounds, Frome	Drawn		Hazell 6-51; W H Copson 5-37

== Statistics ==
=== County Championship batting averages ===
Name	Matches	Inns	Runs	High score	Average	100s
D Smith	24	42	1391	146	35.66	2
A F Townsend	24	42	1137	105	27.73	1
CS Elliott	24	44	846	120	20.63	1
P Vaulkhard	13	20	634	264	31.70	1
T S Worthington	16	27	539	147*	20.73	1
AC Revill	22	38	534	61	16.18	0
AEG Rhodes	25	39	508	63	13.72	0
A E Alderman	14	24	503	101	22.86	1
C Gladwin	25	42	488	61*	15.25	0
GF Hodgkinson	14	23	351	41	15.26	0
FE Marsh	15	25	229	24	13.47	0
W H Copson	24	33	98	18*	4.26	0
JD Eggar	3	5	171	86	34.20	0
H Pope	8	12	67	24*	6.70	0
WR Genders	3	6	62	24	12.40	0
W Fullwood	6	10	41	13	4.55	0
T R Armstrong	5	9	37	10*	9.25	0
LI Pearson	2	4	24	18	6.00	0
HS Carter	3	4	8	7	2.00	0
DB Carr	4	5	6	5	1.20	0
JDW Tomlinson	1	1	2	2	2.00	0

=== County Championship bowling averages ===
Name	Balls	Runs	Wickets	BB	Average
C Gladwin	4695	1812	102	7-41	17.76
W H Copson	4614	1836	91	6-49	20.17
AEG Rhodes	4068	2010	69	7-109	29.13
T R Armstrong	1122	493	28	5-32	17.60
FE Marsh	1085	591	16	3-31	36.93
DB Carr	424	181	9	3-43	20.11
H Pope	837	420	9	2-86	46.66
CS Elliott	492	278	6	2-25	46.33
AC Revill	321	131	3	3-13	43.66
T S Worthington	660	279	3	2-24	93.00
HS Carter	90	46	2	2-39	23.00
JD Eggar	186	86	0		
WR Genders	18	22	0		

== Wicket Keepers ==
- D Smith Catches 32, Stumping 4
- W Fullwood Catches 5, Stumping 1
- P Vaulkhard Catches 15, Stumping 1

== See also ==
- Derbyshire County Cricket Club seasons
- 1946 English cricket season
