= Fulwood =

Fulwood may refer to:

== People ==
- Fulwood (surname)

== Places ==
- Fulwood, Lancashire, England
  - Fulwood Urban District, a former local government district
  - Fulwood railway station in Lancashire, later renamed Ribbleton railway station
- Fulwood, Nottinghamshire, a former civil parish in Skegby Rural District, England
- Fulwood, Sheffield, a suburb of Sheffield, England
  - Fulwood (ward), South Yorkshire, an electoral ward of Sheffield, England
- Fulwood, Somerset, a location
