= Roy Genders =

English cricketer (1913–1985)

Personal information
- Full name: William Roy Genders
- Born: 21 January 1913; Dore, Derbyshire, England
- Died: 28 September 1985 (aged 72); Worthing, Sussex, England
- Batting: Right-handed

Domestic team information
- Years: Team
- 1946: Derbyshire
- 1947–1948: Worcestershire
- 1949: Somerset
- FC debut: 13 July 1946 Derbyshire v Lancashire
- Last FC: 20 July 1949 Somerset v Derbyshire

Career statistics
Competition	First-class
Matches	10
Runs scored	245
Batting average	16.33
100s/50s	0/1
Top score	55*
Balls bowled	132
Wickets	3
Bowling average	32.66
5 wickets in innings	0
10 wickets in match	0
Best bowling	2/43
Catches/stumpings	6/0
- Source: CricketArchive, January 2012

William Roy Genders (21 January 1913 – 28 September 1985) was an English first-class cricketer who played for Derbyshire in 1946, for Worcestershire from 1947 to 1948 and for Somerset in 1949.

Genders was born in Dore, then in Derbyshire. He played several games for Derbyshire in 1945 before first-class cricket was resumed after the war. He remained with Derbyshire in the 1946 season, appearing thrice with little success. During the next 1947 and 1948 seasons he played five times for Worcestershire, and it was here that he recorded his best performances. He made 55 not out against his old club Derbyshire, and took all his three wickets for the county in a single match against Gloucestershire; the most notable of his victims was probably "one-Test wonder" George Emmett.

Genders' last two matches in first-class cricket came for Somerset in the 1949 seasons, but his scores of 3, 22, 0 and 4 were unimpressive and he never played county cricket again. His 22 came in Somerset's second innings against Cambridge University in June 1949. In this match, all eleven Somerset players (and Extras) reached double figures, but none went on to score a half-century.

Genders was a right-handed batsman and played 19 innings in ten first-class matches with an average of 16.33 and a top score of 55 not out. He took three first-class wickets with an average of 32.66 and a best performance of 2 for 43.

Genders wrote two books about cricket, one a history of Worcestershire County Cricket Club and the other concerning English league cricket. He also wrote a great many books on the subject of gardening.

Genders died at the age of 72 in Worthing, Sussex.
