= Bowden-Smith =

Bowden-Smith is a surname, and may refer to:

- Frederick Bowden-Smith (1841–1919), English clergyman and cricketer
- Nathaniel Bowden-Smith (1838–1921), British Royal Navy officer
- Philip Bowden-Smith (1891–1964), British Army officer
