= Eric Marsh (cricketer, born 1920) =

English cricketer

Personal information
- Full name: Frederick Eric Marsh
- Born: 17 July 1920; Bolsover, England
- Died: 25 February 2003 (aged 82); Derby, England
- Batting: Left-handed
- Bowling: Left-arm slow
- Relatives: Stan Worthington (uncle)

Domestic team information
- Years: Team
- 1946–1949: Derbyshire
- FC debut: 18 May 1946 Derbyshire v Essex
- Last FC: 9 July 1949 Derbyshire v New Zealanders

Career statistics
Competition	First-class
Matches	66
Runs scored	1,627
Batting average	18.28
100s/50s	0/7
Top score	86
Balls bowled	3,423
Wickets	44
Bowling average	38.59
5 wickets in innings	1
10 wickets in match	0
Best bowling	6/37
Catches/stumpings	32/–
- Source: CricketArchive, January 2012

Frederick Eric Marsh (17 July 1920 – 25 February 2003) was an English cricketer who played first-class cricket for Derbyshire County Cricket Club between 1946 and 1949.

Marsh was born in Bolsover and played several miscellaneous matches for Derbyshire and local sides during the Second World War. He was one of several players to be given the chance to represent Derbyshire on the restart of the County Championship. He made a fair impact during his debut season of 1946, making one half-century. In the three seasons following his debut, he hit two half-centuries per season and bowled 6 for 37 against Northamptonshire in 1947.

Marsh was a left-handed batsman and played 109 innings in 66 first-class matches with an average of 18.28 and a top score of 86. He was a slow left-arm bowler and took 44 first-class wickets at an average of 38.59 and with a best performance of 6 for 37.

Marsh died at Derby at the age of 82 on 25 February 2003. His uncle was Stan Worthington, nine-time Test cricketer and Wisden Cricketer of the Year for 1937.
