= Bartholomew Ashwood =

English puritan divine

Bartholomew Ashwood (1622–1680) was an English puritan divine.

== Life ==
Ashwood was 'a Warwickshire man,' son of a clergyman of the same name (who matriculated at Magdalen College, Oxford, in 1591, also as a Warwickshire man, aged 13, and proceeded M.A. in 1601). He became a batter or commoner of St. Alban's Hall in the latter end of 1638, aged 16 years, and so was born 1621–2. But Anthony à Wood informs us: 'Having been puritanically educated, he was translated, after some continuance in the said hall, to Exeter College, and there put under a tutor puritanically then esteem'd, and took one degree in arts as a member of that college, and was soon beneficed and became a man of the times.'

His 'benefice' was Bickleigh, Devonshire, and he is enrolled by Walker as one of the 'loyalist sufferers' (p. 182) of that parish. Walker assumes that he 'died under the usurpation,' i.e. the Commonwealth. But he lived to form one of the 'two thousand' by being 'ejected' in 1662 from Axminster in Devon. He continued to preach for many years, in spite of the severe restrictions imposed on nonconformists. In his old age he seems to have been left in sore straits, and died 'about 1680.' In his probate inventory, Ashwood's personal library was valued at £20. He was the father of John Ashwood.

== Works ==
His three books are:

- 'The Heavenly Trade, or the Best Merchandizing, the only way to live well in impoverishing Times, a Discourse occasion'd from the Decay of earthly Trades and visible Wasts of practical Piety in the Days we live in, offering Arguments and Counsells; to all, towards a speedy Revival of dying Godliness,' &c. (1679)
- 'The Best Treasure, or the Way to be truly Rich, being a Discourse on Ephesians iii. 8, wherein is opened and commended to Saints and Sinners the personal and purchased Riches of Christ as the best Treasure to be possessed' (1681). John Owen wrote a preface to the 'Best Treasure.'
- 'Groans for Sin' (1681).
