= Henry Grove =

English nonconformist minister and theologian

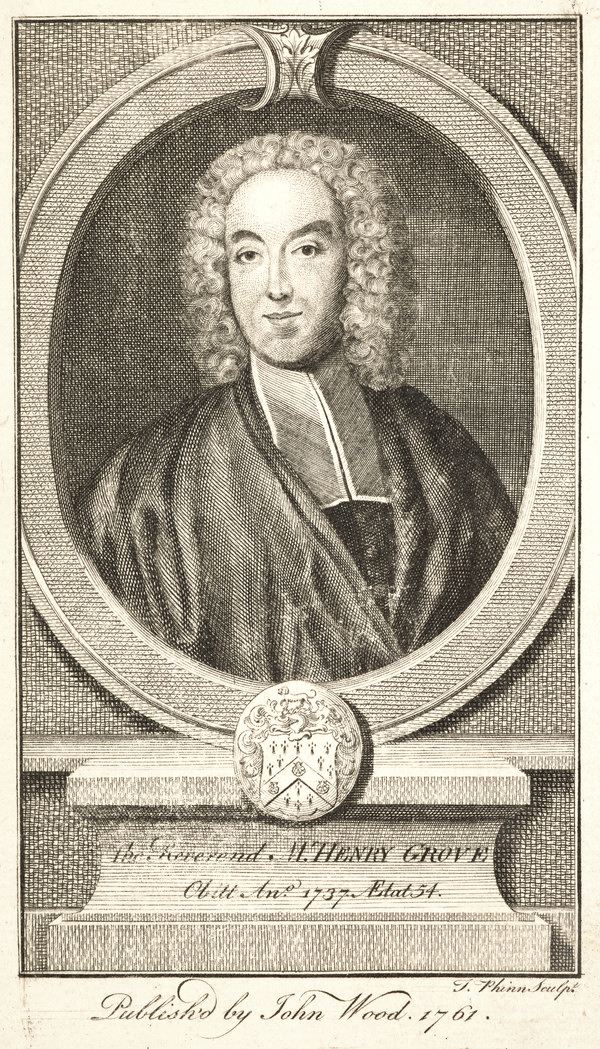
Henry Grove

Henry Grove (4 January 1684 – 27 February 1738) was an English nonconformist minister, theologian, and dissenting tutor.

== Life ==
He was born at Taunton, Somerset, on 4 January 1684. His grandfather was the ejected vicar of Pinhoe, Devon, whose son, a Taunton upholsterer, married a sister of John Rowe, ejected from a lectureship at Westminster Abbey; Henry was the youngest of fourteen children, most of whom died young. Grounded in classics at the Taunton grammar school, he proceeded at the age of fourteen (1698) to the Taunton dissenting academy. Here he went through a course of philosophy and divinity under Matthew Warren. The text-books were David Derodon, Franco Burgersdyck, and Eustachius de Saint-Paul; Grove devoted himself to Jean Leclerc, Richard Cumberland, and John Locke. In 1703, he moved to London to study under his cousin Thomas Rowe, in whose academy he remained two years. Rowe was a Cartesian; Grove became a disciple of Isaac Newton. He studied Hebrew, and formed his style of preaching on Richard Lucas and John Howe. With Isaac Watts he began a close friendship, which survived many differences of opinion.

In 1705 Grove returned to Somerset, where his preaching attracted attention. He married, and probably settled for a short time at Ilchester. Warren died on 14 June 1706. The Somerset presbyterians met to arrange for carrying on the Taunton Academy, and appointed Grove, in his twenty-third year, tutor in ethics and pneumatology. He lived at Taunton, and took charge of the neighbouring congregations of Hull Bishop's and West Hatch, with James Strong.

The resignation of Darch, his colleague at the academy, threw on him the conduct of the departments of mathematics and physics. Early in 1725 Stephen James, the divinity tutor, died, and Grove, without relinquishing his other work, took his place, with the assistance of his nephew, Thomas Amory. He resigned his congregations to succeed James as minister at Fullwood (or Pitminster), near Taunton. He declined invitations to Exeter and London. He refused to take any share in the doctrinal disputes which spread from Exeter to London in 1719, and produced the rupture at Salters' Hall. His orthodoxy was called in question by John Ball, especially because of his discourse on saving faith (1736); but though he laid great stress on the reasonableness of Christianity, and on the moral argument for a future state, he avoided speculations on the doctrine of the Trinity.

The Taunton Academy sustained its reputation during his tutorship. A list of ninety-three of his students is given by James Manning; twenty-two extra names are given in Joshua Toulmin's manuscript list.

Grove preached on 19 February 1738, and was seized the same night with a violent fever, of which he died on 27 February. He was buried at Taunton, where there is a tablet to his memory in Paul's Meeting, bearing a Latin inscription from the pen of John Ward of Gresham College. James Strong of Ilminster and William May of London preached funeral sermons. His wife died insane in 1736; he had thirteen children, of whom five survived him.

== Works ==
He took care over his sermons, and systematised his lectures on metaphysics and ethics; his ethical system (published posthumously and in an unfinished state) was his favourite work. His first publication, on the "regulation of diversions" (1708), was designed to produce in his pupils the love of a high morale. He wrote hymns; his poetical flights were stimulated by the friendship of Elizabeth Singer.

In 1708 he corresponded with Samuel Clarke on the defects of his argument for the existence of God. For Clarke, as a Newtonian, he had respect, but thought him inferior as a metaphysician to Andrew Baxter (metaphysician). In 1714 he contributed four papers to the revived issue (eighth volume) of The Spectator. Grove published (1718) an essay on the immateriality of the soul.

Grove's publications included:

- An Essay towards a Demonstration of the Soul's Immateriality, &c., 1718; has apreface on the reality of an external world against Arthur Collier.
- The Evidence for our Saviour's Resurrection, 1730, commended by Lardner.
- Some Thoughts concerning the Proofs of a Future State from Reason, 1730, against Joseph Hallet III.
- Queries proposed to … all such as think it an injury to Religion to show the Reasonableness of it, 1732, (anon.)

Posthumous were:

- Miscellanies in Prose and Verse, most of them formerly published, 1739.
- Sermons and Tracts, &c., 1740, 4 vols.; second series, 1741–2, 6 vols.; the two series reissued as Posthumous Works, 1745, 10 vols.
- A System of Moral Philosophy, 1749, 2 vols., edited, and the last eight chapters written, by Amory, who edited the other posthumous works.

Some of his verses were included in the continuation of John Dryden's Miscellany Poems, 1706, vol. vi., and in similar collections. His letters on free will and immortality and in defence of the Presbyterians (against John Trenchard) appeared in the 'St. James's Journal,' 1722. His last Spectator was included by Bishop Edmund Gibson in his edition (1731) of Joseph Addison's Evidences of the Christian Religion.

At the time of his death Grove was writing the life of Elizabeth Rowe. The lists of subscribers to his posthumous works include the names of Archbishop Thomas Herring, with Hoadly, Secker, and Hutton among the bishops.
