= John Tomlinson (cricketer) =

English cricketer

Personal information
- Full name: John Derek Williams Tomlinson
- Born: 26 March 1926; South Normanton, England
- Died: 1 April 2010 (aged 84); St. John's, Newfoundland and Labrador, Canada
- Batting: Right-handed

Domestic team information
- Years: Team
- 1946: Derbyshire
- Only FC: 28 August 1946 Derbyshire v Somerset

Career statistics
Competition	First-class
Matches	1
Runs scored	2
Batting average	2.00
100s/50s	0/0
Top score	2
Catches/stumpings	1/–
- Source: CricketArchive, January 2012

John Derek Williams Tomlinson (26 March 1926 – 1 April 2010) was an English cricketer who played first-class cricket for Derbyshire County Cricket Club in 1946.

Tomlinson was born in South Normanton. He played several games for Derbyshire Club and Ground and the Derbyshire second XI before his first-class debut for Derbyshire in the 1946 season. His only first-class match was against Somerset in August 1946. He continued playing occasionally for the Club and Ground and Second XI in 1947 and 1948.

Tomlinson was a right-handed batsman, and made two runs in his single first-class innings.

Tomlinson died aged 84 at St. John's, Newfoundland and Labrador
