= Theophilus Gale =

English educationalist, nonconformist and theologian

Theophilus Gale (1628–1678) was an English educationalist, nonconformist and theologian of dissent.

== Early life ==
Gale was born at Kingsteignton, Devon, the son of Bridget Gale (née Walrond) and Theophilus Gale D. D. (died 1639), vicar of Kingsteignton and prebendary of Exeter Cathedral. Gale was educated by a private tutor, before attending grammar school, and being admitted to the University of Oxford, entered Magdalen Hall in 1647 as a commoner. Magdalen Hall was shortly to be the home of nonconforming students: William Conway, John Cudmore, Joseph Maisters and, according to Edmund Calamy, a 'Mr. Sprint'. In August 1648 Henry Wilkinson was appointed as Principal; he was a major figure in Civil War and Protectorate Oxford, lecturing at Carfax Church between 10 October 1642 and 16 June 1662.

Gale became a demy (funded scholar) of Magdalen College following the Parliamentary Visitation of 1648. Here he took his B. A. in 1649, becoming a Fellow and Tutor of Magdalen the following year and being awarded M. A. in 1652. He was then appointed lecturer in Logic (1652) and was later to become a Junior Dean of Arts (1657) and a Senior Dean of Arts (1658). One of his tutorial pupils was Ezekiel Hopkins. In 1657 he had also been appointed a preacher at Winchester Cathedral, alongside Humphrey Ellis, perhaps Faithful Teate (although this is difficult to substantiate) and George Lawrence (Chaplain of the Hospital of St Cross). Magdalen itself was home to some of the most influential radical theologians of the day, including Thomas Goodwin (President), Henry Hickman (Fellow), Zachary Mayne (Fellow) and John Gipps (Chaplain). Gale's Congregationalism made him a natural ally of Goodwin, and may also have led to an association with John Owen, Vice-Chancellor of Oxford and President of Christ Church for much of this period.

== Ejected minister ==
Under the Act for Restoration of Ministers (1660) many Puritans and other radicals lost their posts. Gale lost his place at Winchester Cathedral, and also was forced to resign his Fellowship at Magdalen. The Act of Uniformity (1662) required subscription on oath to the articles of the newly restored Church of England and a faithful following of the newly revised Book of Common Prayer (1662) in services for all clergy and teachers. These stipulations permanently barred Gale from University teaching, government employment and the Church of England ministry.

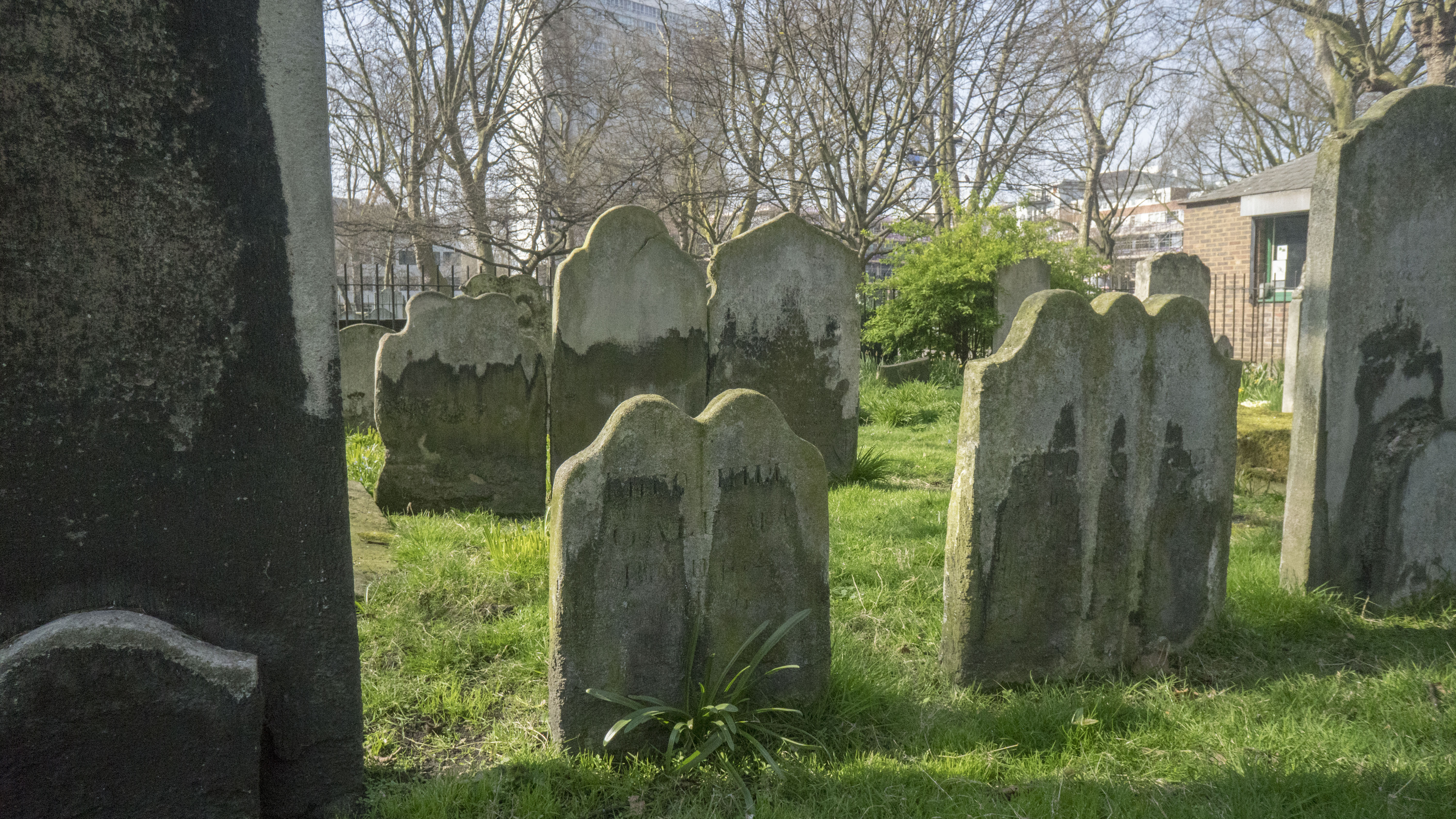
Gale's headstone, Bunhill Fields

Gale was fortunate in his contacts. Philip Wharton had been a supporter of Parliament in the Civil War and had built up a network of ministerial friends, including John Owen, Thomas Manton, William Bates and John Howe. Wharton, a lay member of the Westminster Assembly in the 1650s, continued an influential dissenting Member of Parliament for Buckinghamshire through the Restoration period. He had connections in the United Provinces and France. In 1662 he offered Gale £40 a year as tutor to his sons, a position which enabled Gale to travel to the French Huguenot College at Caen and meet other scholars including Samuel Bochart. Gale's strictness as a teacher offended his patron and he was dismissed in July 1664. After taking the opportunity to travel for a few months, he returned to England in early 1665 and was back at Wharton's Quainton estate before the end of the year.

The latter portion of his life Gale passed in London as assistant to John Rowe, an Independent minister who had charge of a church in Holborn, active in the lull of efforts against conventicles after the Great Fire. Gale settled at Newington Green and took pupils: John Ashwood of Peckham, and the two sons of John Rowe, Thomas (who succeeded Gale as minister) and Benoni. Gale succeeded Rowe in 1677, and died in the following year. He is buried in Bunhill Fields burial ground, where his headstone is believed to be the earliest surviving monument.

== The Court of the Gentiles ==
Gale worked in the 1660s on manuscripts for a large-scale and erudite theoretical work of intellectual history; a hint in Grotius's De Veritate (i. 16) gave him the idea of the derivation of all ancient learning and philosophy from the Hebrew scriptures. He therefore traced European languages to the Hebrew language, and all the theologies, sciences, politics, and literature of pagan antiquity to a Hebrew tradition. In a similar way he dealt with the origin of all philosophies. He also accounted for the errors of pagan philosophy and Catholic divinity by the theory of corruption by successive apostasies from a divine original. Constructively he proposed a reformed Platonism, and tried to rescue the Calvinistic doctrine of predetermination from difficulties. Work left in store escaped the Great Fire of London in 1666.

Gale's major work, The Court of the Gentiles, taking its name from the Court of the Gentiles in the Second Temple, appeared in parts in 1669, 1671 and 1676. It takes the form of a storehouse of miscellaneous philosophical learning. It resembles the Intellectual System of Ralph Cudworth, though many regarded it as inferior. Gale's endeavour (based on a hint of Grotius) was to provide evidence that the foundation of European Christian philosophy is a distorted reproduction of Biblical truths. Just as Cudworth referred the Democritean doctrine of atoms to Moses as the original author, so Gale tries to show that the various systems of Greek thought may be traced back to Middle Eastern and South Asian sources.

The Court of the Gentiles was attacked by the church and referred to as being chaotic and unsystematic. Biblical scholars claimed it lacked discrimination. Each of the four books is broken into multiple sections and the information organised into dozens of chapters. Most pages have dozens of references to previous authors, a flow of references woven into the text rather than being presented in footnotes.

== Works ==
- 1669: The True Idea of Jansenisme, London
- 1669: The Court of the Gentiles, Oxford, 1669, 1670, 1671, 1672. A copy on google books
- 1671: The Life and Death of Thomas Tregosse Late Minister of the Gospel, at Milar and Mabe in Cornwal [sic], London
- 1671 Theophilie: or A Discourse of the Saints Amitie with God in Christ, London
- 1672: The Anatomie of Infidelitie, London
- 1673: The Life and Death of Mr. John Rowe of Crediton in Devon, London
- 1673: Idea Theologiae, London
- 1673: A Discourse of Christ's Coming, London
- 1676: Philosophia Generalis, London
- 1676: The Court of the Gentiles. Part II., London. A copy on EEBO
- 1677: The Court of the Gentiles. Part III., London
- 1677: The Court of the Gentiles. Part IV., London, 1677, 1678, 1682
- 1678: Dedication to William Strong's A Discourse of the Two Covenants, London
- 1679: Christ's Tears for Jerusalems Unbelief and Ruine, London

Ars Sciendi (1681) by T. G. is now attributed to Thomas Gowan.

== Sources ==
- Malusa, Luciano. "Theophilus Gale (1628–1678): The Court of the Gentiles and Philosophia Generalis," in Models of the History of Philosophy: From Its Origins in the Renaissance to the 'Historia Philosophica,' eds. C. W. T. Blackwell and Philip Weller (Boston: Kluwer Academic Publishers, 1993).
- Park, Jae-Eun. "Theophilus Gale's Reformed Platonism: Focusing on His Discourse of "Creation" and "Providence" in The Court of the Gentiles," Mid-America Journal of Theology 24 (2013): 121–142.
- Pigney, Stephen J. "Theophilus Gale and Historiography of Philosophy," in Insiders and Outsiders in Seventeenth-Century Philosophy, ed. Rogers Graham (New York: Routledge, 2010).
- Tigerstedt, E. N. "Gale," in The Decline and Fall of the Neoplatonic Interpretation of Plato: An Outline and Some Observations (Helsinki: Societas Scientariarum Fennica, 1974).
- Wallace, Dewey D. "Theophilus Gale: Calvinism and the Ancient Theology," in Shapers of English Calvinism, 1660–1714: Variety, Persistence, and Transformation (New York: Oxford University Press, 2011).
- This article incorporates text from a publication now in the public domain: Gordon, Alexander (1889). "Gale, Theophilus". In Stephen, Leslie (ed.). Dictionary of National Biography. Vol. 20. London: Smith, Elder & Co. pp. 377–378.
