= Thomas Rowe (tutor) =

English nonconformist minister

Thomas Rowe (1657–1705) was an English nonconformist minister, significant as the teacher of the next generation of Dissenters, particularly in philosophy, in one of the first of the dissenting academies.

== Life ==
The elder son of John Rowe, he was born in London in 1657. He was probably educated by Theophilus Gale. In 1678 he succeeded Gale, both as pastor of the independent church in Holborn and as tutor in the academy at Newington Green. He moved his congregation to a meeting-house at Girdlers' Hall, Basinghall Street, and took his academy successively to Clapham and, about 1687, to Little Britain.

His ministry was successful; but it was as a tutor, especially in philosophy, that he made his mark as an early adopter of new ideas. He was the first to desert the traditional textbooks, introducing his pupils, about 1680, to what was known as ‘free philosophy.’ Rowe was a Cartesian at a time when the Aristotelian philosophy was still dominant in the older schools of learning; but while in physics he adhered to Descartes against the rising influence of Isaac Newton, he also became one of the earliest exponents of John Locke. His students included John Evans, D.D., Henry Grove, Josiah Hort, John Hughes the poet, Jeremiah Hunt, D.D., Daniel Neal, and Isaac Watts.

Rowe was a Calvinist in theology, but few of his pupils adhered to the same system without some modification. In 1699 he became one of the Tuesday lecturers at Pinners' Hall. He died suddenly on 18 August 1705, and was buried with his father in Bunhill Fields.

== Family ==
Benoni Rowe (1658–1706) was his brother-in-law, husband to his sister Sarah. He was born in London, and educated for the ministry. His first known settlement was at Epsom, Surrey, about 1689. He succeeded Stephen Lobb in 1699 as pastor of the independent church in Fetter Lane. He died on 30 March 1706, and was buried in Bunhill Fields. He left two sons: Thomas (1687–1715), husband of Elizabeth Rowe; and Theophilus.
