= John Quick (divine) =

John Quick (1636 – 29 April 1706) was an English nonconformist divine.

== Early life ==
Quick was born in Plymouth. After graduating at Oxford in 1657 he was ordained at Ermington in Devon in 1659. A more famous contemporary John Flavel (1628–91) ministered at nearby Dartmouth. He served at Kingsbridge and then at Brixton near Plymouth.

== Imprisonment ==
Undeterred by the Act of Uniformity 1662, he continued to preach. He was arrested during a service on 13 December 1663 and imprisoned at Exeter. At his trial, he was nearly acquitted on a technicality, but since he refused to give up preaching, he was sent to prison. After eight weeks, he was liberated by Sir Matthew Hale. The Bishop of Exeter, Seth Ward, then prosecuted Quick for preaching to the prisoners but he was acquitted.

Charles II's Royal Declaration of Indulgence of 1672 brought a brief respite for the persecuted Puritan brotherhood. Quick was licensed to preach at Plymouth. When restrictions were imposed again the following year, he was imprisoned for three months with other nonconformists at the Marshalsea prison in Plymouth.

On his release, Quick left the west of England for London. He then traveled to the Dutch Republic where he became a minister to the English church at Middelburg in 1679. Returning to London two years later, Quick gathered a Presbyterian congregation in a small meeting house in Middlesex Court, Bartholomew Close and Smithfield.

On the eve of easier times, his London ministry “successful to the conversion of many,” says Edmund Calamy was relatively undisturbed; the Glorious Revolution and the Toleration Act 1688 eventually brought persecution to an end. Known as “a serious, good preacher” with a “great facility and freedom in prayer,” John Quick continued to serve his people faithfully until his death on 29 April 1706. His wife Elizabeth died in 1708. Their only daughter became the wife of Dr. John Evans (c. 1680–1730) who completed the Matthew Henry's commentary on the Epistle to the Romans.

== Publications ==
Quick was author of the Synodicon in Gallia Reformata - a collection of liturgical texts used by the Huguenots in late 17th-century England. During his early ministry, he became acquainted with the Huguenot refugees, some of whom landed at Plymouth from La Rochelle in 1681—the year the dragonnades began.

Quick's interest in the Huguenots did not end with the Synodicon. Besides published sermons of his own, he also prepared for publication a selection of fifty brief biographies of eminent pastors, theologians, and martyrs of the French Reformed Church, the Icones Sacrae Gallicanae.

He also produced a similar selection of twenty Puritans, the Icones Sacrae Anglicanae. These ambitious ventures failed with the death in 1700 of William Russell, 1st Duke of Bedford (the dedicatee of the Synodicon) who had offered to assist with the cost. Advancing illness also prevented Quick from collecting subscriptions for the work. Following the Quick's death, the manuscript volumes were eventually deposited at Dr. Williams's Library in London.
