= Jack Pearson =

English cricketer

Personal information
- Full name: Lawrence Ivor Jackson
- Born: 25 January 1922; Darnall, Sheffield, England
- Died: 1 October 2007 (aged 85); Sutton-in-Ashfield, Nottinghamshire, England
- Batting: Left-handed

Domestic team information
- Years: Team
- 1946: Derbyshire
- FC debut: 7 August 1946 Derbyshire v Glamorgan
- Last FC: 14 August 1946 Derbyshire v Northamptonshire

Career statistics
Competition	First-class
Matches	2
Runs scored	24
Batting average	6.00
100s/50s	0/0
Top score	18
Catches/stumpings	0/–
- Source: CricketArchive, January 2012

Lawrence Ivor "Jack" Pearson (25 January 1922 – 1 October 2007) was an English cricketer who played first-class cricket for Derbyshire County Cricket Club in 1946.

Pearson was born at Darnall, Sheffield. He began playing for Derbyshire in July 1945 before the County Championship came back after the Second World War. He made his debut for Derbyshire in the 1946 season in a match against Glamorgan in August. He played one more first-class match in the same month which was his last for Derbyshire.

Pearson was a left-handed batsman who played four innings in two first-class matches with an average of 6.00 and a top score of 18.

Pearson died at the age of 85 at Sutton-in-Ashfield, Nottinghamshire.
