= Audrey Ellerbee Bowden =

Biomedical engineer

Audrey K. Ellerbee Bowden
- Born: Audrey K. Ellerbee
- Education: Princeton University, Duke University
- Awards: Air Force Young Investigator Award, NSF Career Award, Hellman Faculty Scholars Award
- Scientific career
- Fields: Biomedical engineering, biomedical optics, microfluidics, optical tomography, biophotonics
- Workplaces: Vanderbilt University, Stanford University, Harvard University
- Thesis: Spectral Domain Phase Microscopy: A novel investigative tool for cellular dynamics (2007)
- Doctoral advisor: Joseph Izatt
- Website: https://lab.vanderbilt.edu/bowdenlab/

Audrey K. Ellerbee Bowden is an American engineer and Dorothy J. Wingfield Phillips Chancellor's Faculty Fellow at Vanderbilt University, as well as a professor of biomedical engineering and electrical engineering. She is a Fellow of Optica, the American Institute for Medical and Biological Engineering and the International Society for Optics and Photonics (SPIE).

Her research in biomedical optics focuses on developing new imaging techniques and devices for optical coherence tomography and for applications in medical diagnostics, cancer therapy, and low-cost point-of-care technologies.

== Education ==
Bowden obtained her BSE degree in electrical engineering from Princeton University in 2001, and was a visiting lecturer in the Department of Infocommunications Technology at Ngee Ann Polytechnic from 2001 to 2002 through the Princeton in Asia program.

She completed her Ph.D. in biomedical engineering at Duke University in 2007, specialising in optical coherence tomography. Her research focused on developing and using a technique called spectral domain phase microscopy, a new method for studying cellular dynamics.

Her doctoral studies were funded by an National Science Foundation Graduate Research Fellowship, the James B. Duke fellowship, the Duke Endowment, and the University Scholars Program. She was also named a John T. Chambers Fellow at the Fitzpatrick Center for Photonics and Communication Systems, and was a recipient of the Graduate Student of the Year Award from the National Society of Black Engineers in 2007.

== Research and career ==
Bowden was named an Arthur H. Guenther Congressional Fellow in 2008 by SPIE and Optica, spending a year working for Senator Carl Levin of Michigan.

She then became postdoctoral fellow in chemistry and chemical biology at Harvard University, later joining Stanford University as an assistant professor in 2010. There, she was the director of the biomedical optics research group, focusing on developing new optical imaging techniques. Bowden received the Young Investigator Award from the Air Force Office of Scientific Research in 2012 for her research on self-powered optical spectroscopy, and a National Science Foundation CAREER Award in 2014 to investigate how biomechanical and morphological characteristics could be used to predict the viability of early-stage embryos.

In 2018, she joined Vanderbilt University as an associate professor of biomedical engineering, and was named the 2018 Dorothy J. Wingfield Phillips Chancellor's Faculty Fellow. Her research group develops new imaging devices and techniques based on optical coherence tomography, and developing point-of-care diagnostics for resource-constrained settings for applications in global health. The group works with clinicians to apply their diagnostics technology in areas such as early cancer detection.

She was elected as a Fellow of the International Society for Optics and Photonics (SPIE) “for achievements in optical coherence tomography” in 2019, to the American Institute for Medical and Biological Engineering “for developing optical devices and systems for biomedicine” in 2020, and to Optica “for outstanding achievements in the development of optical devices, image processing algorithms and systems for biomedicine” in 2021. She will also serve on the Board of Directors of SPIE for 2022-2024.

She is a former associate editor of the IEEE Photonics Journal.

== Awards and honours ==
- 2021 Fellow of Optica for "outstanding achievements in the development of optical devices, image processing algorithms and systems for biomedicine."
- 2020 Fellow of the American Institute for Medical and Biological Engineering
- 2019 Fellow of the International Society for Optics and Photonics (SPIE)
- 2016 Stanford Phi Beta Kappa Teaching Award
- 2014 National Science Foundation CAREER Award
- 2012 Air Force Young Investigator Award
- 2012 Hellman Fellows Award
