= Ian Saem Majnep =

- Born: c. 1948; Madang Province, Papua New Guinea
- Died: September 2007
- Citizenship: Papua New Guinea

Academic work
- Discipline: Ethnobiology; Anthropology; Linguistics
- Sub-discipline: Kalam ethnobiology and linguistics

Ian Saem Majnep (c. 1948 – September 2007) was a naturalist from the Kalam people of Papua New Guinea who wrote about the plants, animals and the belief systems of the Kalam people while collaborating with the British anthropologist and ethnobiologist Ralph Bulmer. He worked as a field assistant for Bulmer at the University of Papua New Guinea in Port Moresby and co-authored several books with Bulmer. He was also a main contributor to a dictionary of the Kalam language, which was published posthumously.

== Biography ==
Majnep was born around 1948. He belonged to the Kalam people of Madang Province, Papua New Guinea. The name Majnep means "Just sweet potatoes", derived from the situation faced by his family at the time of his birth, of having nothing to eat but sweet potatoes. When he was just four, his father died after a fall from a tree and his mother, Kalam, took care of him. They lived in the mountain forest above Gobnem (pronounced Gombnem) and in the Gulkm Valley. His mother was described by him as an expert hunter of animals and knowledgeable on the plants. He learned to recognize and survive on plants and animals around him from a very young age.

When he was 11, the Kalam people came in contact with the outside world, and Europeans came to the region to study them. They included Ralph Bulmer and Bruce Biggs. As a child, he visited their camps, and when he was 15, he began to assist Bulmer, who continued to make visits. He became a field assistant for Bulmer, who translated his notes and made him the first author of the books they wrote together in later years.

From 1968, Majnep was employed by the University of Papua New Guinea as a research assistant. This work took Majnep on field trips to various parts of PNG, to do archaeological work in Chimbu and the Eastern Highlands Provinces and in the Kaironk Valley, as well as in Central Province. He worked with various UPNG staff including Ralph Bulmer, the archaeologist Susan Bulmer and zoologist James Menzies. Initially, Bulmer made use of Majnep as an informant, but in 1974, Bulmer decided to let Majnep be the main author and ethnographer.

Bulmer and Majnep published several works, starting with Birds of My Kalam Country (1977) with Majnep as the main author. Majnep was able to decide the shape and purpose of the anthropological work as ethnographer, rather than as consultant.

In 1974, Majnep was baptised and received the Christian name Ian. In 1977, Majnep got married and returned to live in the Kaironk Valley and raise his family.

Majnep received an honorary doctorate from the University of Papua New Guinea for his contributions to indigenous science in 1989.

Majnep died suddenly in 2007, and Kalam Plant Lore, which he was working on, remains unpublished. A dictionary project that he worked on was published in 2011.

A conference on traditional environmental knowledge was held in his honour in October–November 2012.

In 2017, a gallery in the Papua New Guinea National Museum was named in Majnep's honour.

== Works ==
The writings of Majnep include:

- Majnep, Ian Saem, 1982. On the importance of conserving traditional knowledge of wildlife and hunting and plants. In Louise Morauta, J. Pernatta and W. Heaney, eds, Traditional conservation in Papua New Guinea: implications for today, 79–82. Monograph 16. Port Moresby, Institute of Applied Social and Economic Research.
- Majnep, Ian Saem, 1991. What is this man up to? A Kalam view of Ralph Bulmer. In Pawley ed. 1991, 29–36.
- Majnep, Ian Saem and Ralph Bulmer, 1977. Birds of my Kalam country. Auckland: Auckland and Oxford University Presses.
- Majnep, Ian Saem and Ralph Bulmer, 1983. Some food plants of our Kalam forests. Working Papers in Anthropology, Archaeology, Linguistics, Maori Studies no. 63. Department of Anthropology, University of Auckland.
- Majnep, Ian Saem and Ralph Bulmer 1991. Kalam hunting traditions. (Edited by Andrew Pawley.) Working Papers in Anthropology, Archaeology, Linguistics Maori Studies nos 85–90. Department of Anthropology, University of Auckland. pp. 405.
- Majnep, Ian Saem and Ralph Bulmer 2007. Animals the ancestors hunted: an account of the wild mammals of the Kalam area, Papua New Guinea. (Edited by Robin Hide and Andrew Pawley.) Adelaide: Crawford House Australia.
- Majnep, Ian Saem with Andrew Pawley, 2001. On the value of ecological knowledge to the Kalam of Papua New Guinea: an insider‟s view. In Luisa Maffi ed., Biological diversity: linking language, knowledge and the environment, 343–357. Washington and London: Smithsonian Institution Press.
- Majnep, Ian Saem, Andrew Pawley, Rhys Gardner and Robin Hide (?). Kalam plant lore: an account of the trees and other plants of the Upper Kaironk Valley, Papua New Guinea.
- Pawley, Andrew and Ralph Bulmer, with the assistance of John Kias, Simon Peter Gi and Ian Saem Majnep, 2011. A dictionary of Kalam with ethnographic notes. Canberra: Pacific Linguistics.
