= Fitzpatrick Center =

Research center at Duke University

- (also known as FCIEMAS)
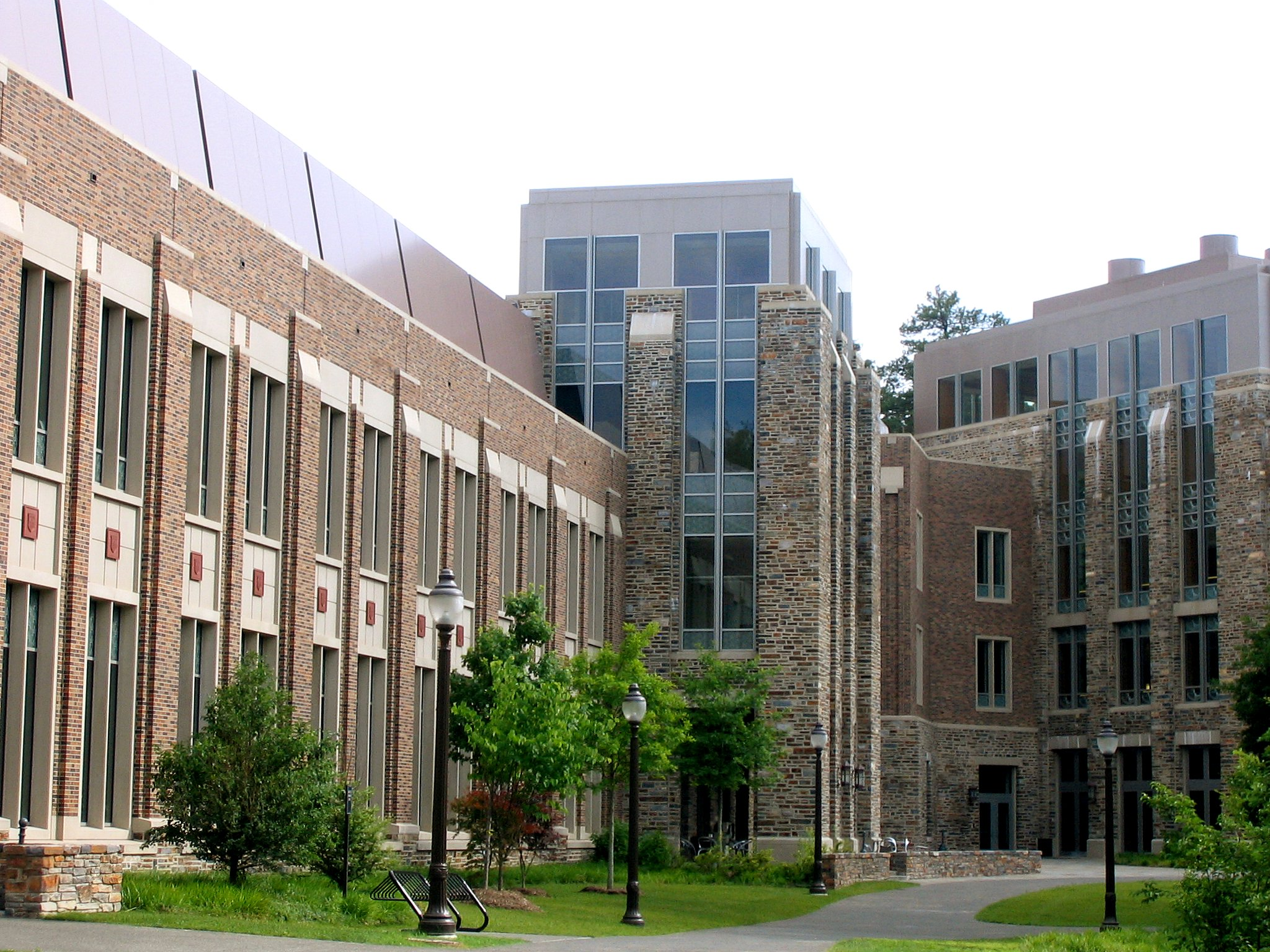
- Interactive map of the Fitzpatrick Center area

General information
- Type: Research center focusing on biology, photonics, materials and integrated sensors
- Location: West Campus, Duke University
- Coordinates: 36.003520°N 78.939599°W
- Named for: Michael and Patty Fitzpatrick
- Completed: 2004

Design and construction
- Architect: Zimmer Gunsul Frasca Partnership

Website
- Duke Engineering

The Fitzpatrick Center for Interdisciplinary Engineering, Medicine and Applied Sciences—colloquially referred to as FCIEMAS (pronounced "eff-see-mas") —opened in August 2004 on the West campus of Duke University. Research facilities focus on the fields of photonics, bioengineering, communications, and materials science and materials engineering. The aim of the building was to emphasize interdisciplinary activities and encourage cross-departmental interactions. The building houses numerous wet bench laboratories (highlighted by a nanotechnology research wing), offices, teaching spaces, and an Irish themed café Twinnie's. FCIEMAS contains: a three-story, 10,000-square-foot (1,000 m^{2}) atrium; 206-seat auditorium; 104,000 square feet (9,700 m^{2}) of laboratory space; 10,000 square feet (1,000 m^{2}) of conference space; and the Duke Immersive Virtual Environment (one of seven in the world). The construction of FCIEMAS took more than three years and cost more than $97 million.

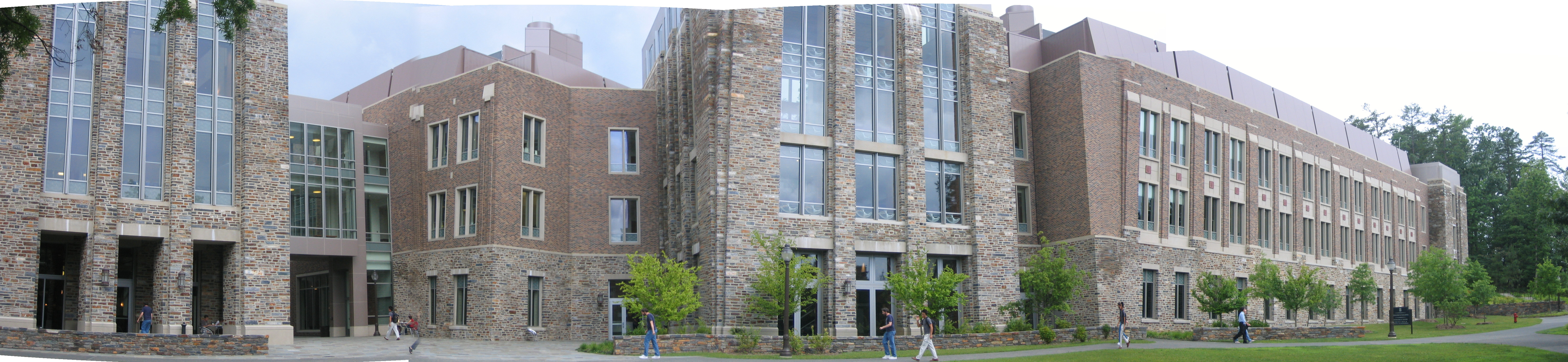
Panorama of the $97 million FCIEMAS

== See also ==
- Duke University Institute for Genome Sciences and Policy
