= Fulwood (surname) =

Fulwood is a surname. Notable people with the surname include:

- Anne Fulwood (born 1959), Australian newsreader
- Charles Fulwood (born 1950), media strategist
- Isaac Fulwood (1940–2017), American police officer
- Tiki Fulwood (1944–1979), American musician
- Wayne Fulwood, drummer
