= Adrian Bowden =

Australian rules footballer

Personal information
- Full name: Adrian Bowden
- Born: 12 October 1947 (age 79)
- Original team: Hobart High School Old Boys
- Height: 183 cm (6 ft 0 in)
- Weight: 82 kg (181 lb)

Playing career^{1}
Years	Club	Games (Goals)
1966–1967	Melbourne	24 (0)
- ^{1} Playing statistics correct to the end of 1967.

Adrian Bowden (born 12 October 1947) is a former Australian rules footballer who played for the Melbourne Football Club in the Victorian Football League (VFL).
