= Herbert Bowden (footballer) =

Australian rules footballer, born 1888

Personal information
- Full name: Henry Herbert Bowden
- Born: 31 March 1888; Collingwood, Victoria
- Died: 3 June 1978 (aged 90); Heidelberg, Victoria
- Original team: Scotch College

Playing career^{1}
Years	Club	Games (Goals)
1908	University	8 (5)
- ^{1} Playing statistics correct to the end of 1908.

Henry Herbert Bowden (31 March 1888 – 3 June 1978) was an Australian rules footballer who played for University in the Victorian Football League (VFL).
