= Ray Bowden (rugby union) =

Australian rugby union player

- Born: Raymond Bowden; 1 September 1903 Walcha, New South Wales
- Died: 7 January 1969 (aged 65)

Rugby union career
- Position: lock
International career
| Years | Team | Apps | (Points) |
| 1926 | Wallabies | 1 | (0) |

Raymond Bowden (1 September 1903 – 7 January 1969) was a rugby union player who represented Australia. He played in the lock position.

Bowden was born in Walcha, New South Wales and claimed 1 international rugby cap for Australia.
