= John Evans (divine) =

Welsh divine (c.1680–1730)

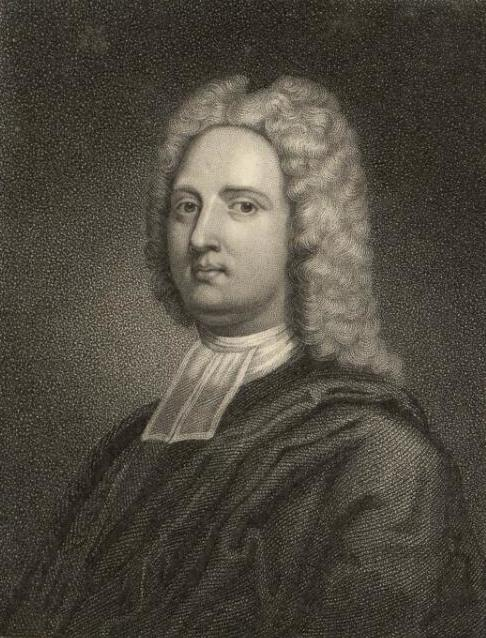
Portrait of John Evans, 1821

John Evans D.D. (c.1680 – 16 May 1730) was a Welsh divine.

== Family background ==
Evans was the son of John Evans, by a daughter of Gilbert Gerard, governor of Chester Castle. He was born at Wrexham, Denbighshire, in 1680 or 1679. His great-grandfather and grandfather were successively rectors of Penegoes, Montgomeryshire, and his father, who was educated at Balliol College, Oxford, was minister at Oswestry, Shropshire, from 1648 to 1662, when, refusing to subscribe to the Act of Uniformity, he was ejected, and went to reside at Wrexham. There he was chosen pastor of the congregational church in 1668, and continued his ministry till his death in 1700.

== Life ==
John Evans the younger was educated first at London under Thomas Rowe, and afterwards under Richard Frankland at Rathmell, Yorkshire. On the death of his father he was taken into the household of a Mrs. Hunt of Boreatton, Baschurch, Shropshire. While living there he is said to have read the whole of the five folio volumes of Matthew Poole's Synopsis Criticorum in Latin, and the works of all the Christian writers of the first three centuries after Christ, under the tuition of James Owen.

In 1702 he was ordained minister at Wrexham, and took charge of a new congregational church there till 1704, when he received an invitation to join the ministry in Dublin. He was dissuaded from accepting it by Dr Daniel Williams, who, while advising him to stay at Wrexham, offered, rather than let him leave the country, to take him as his assistant in London. Evans became Williams's assistant at the meeting-house in Hand Alley, Westminster, till the death of Williams in 1716, when he was chosen his successor. He had come up to London inclined to join the independents, but under Williams's influence finally threw in his lot with the presbyterians.

He was an eloquent and popular preacher, and held in high esteem by his congregation, who in 1729 built for him a new chapel in New Broad Street, Petty France, Westminster. For several years he was Lord's day evening lecturer at Salters' Hall, and in 1723 he was elected preacher of the Merchants' Lecture at the same place. About the same time the honorary degree of D.D. was conferred on him by the universities of Edinburgh and Aberdeen. He frequently presided over public ordinations, and was respected by his own sect and others who admired his tolerant views. He took a leading part in the Arian controversy, siding with those who refused to sign the articles.

Evans was described as being of "uncommonly tall stature, yet not a lusty man".

== Publications ==
Evans published several sermons delivered by him on various occasions. Some twenty of these were issued separately, but he is best known by a series entitled Practical Discourses concerning the Christian Temper; being 38 sermons upon the principal heads of Practical Religion (4th ed. 1737). This work, a sixth edition of which was published as late as 1812, was declared by Isaac Watts (preface to sermons) to be "the most complete summary of those duties which make up Christian life published during our age". Philip Doddridge, who abridged it in his Rise and Progress, describes it as among the best practical treatises in our language. His Sermons on various Subjects addressed to Young People was also reissued in 1802, with a memoir of the author by Dr John Erskine.

In addition to his sermons he published his side of a correspondence with Dr John Cumming, "concerning the regard which ought to be had to Scripture consequences" (1719 and 1722); and illustrated with notes the Epistle to the Romans for the New Testament Commentary left unfinished by Henry. He also wrote a number of introductions for works by his fellow-ministers, and edited Some Account of the Life and Writings of James Owen (1709).

He had formed the plan of writing a comprehensive history of nonconformity from the Reformation to the civil war, and collected the necessary materials at great expense. He read, as he believed, almost every book in any way bearing on the subject, and commenced to write out his work, but he had not finished quite a sixth part of the three folio volumes which it was to occupy, when he was seized with his last illness, and the fragment was never published.

Evans possessed a very fine library, amounting to ten thousand volumes, which was sold by auction on his death to make a provision for his penniless widow and daughter. The catalogue is preserved in Dr Williams's Library, London; where there is also a portrait of him.

== Dr Evans's List of Dissenting Congregations and Ministers, 1715–1729 ==
Evans was the chief compiler of a county by county survey of Baptist, Independent (i.e. Congregational) and Presbyterian congregations and ministers in England and Wales. The survey was the initiative of the committee of the "General Body of Protestant Dissenting Ministers of the Three Denominations in and about the Cities of London and Westminster". Information was gathered by seventeen correspondents, and the final list is in Evans's handwriting. It was compiled in 1715–1718 with additions being made down to 1729. The list is now in the custody of Dr Williams's Library, London.

== Personal life ==
Evans married a lady of considerable wealth, a daughter of John Quick, an ejected minister. With her fortune and his own savings he was induced to speculate in the South Sea Company. The whole was lost, and his later years were troubled by financial difficulties, which hastened his end. It was generally believed that his daughter was an heiress, so well did he keep up appearances, and though certain members of his congregation helped him with money, the cause of his poverty remained secret till after his death.

== Death ==
Evans died on 16 May 1730 from dropsy and a complication of other disorders. He was buried in Dr Williams's vault in Bunhill Fields burial ground.
