= Mark Bowden (English author) =

English body language expert (born 1970)

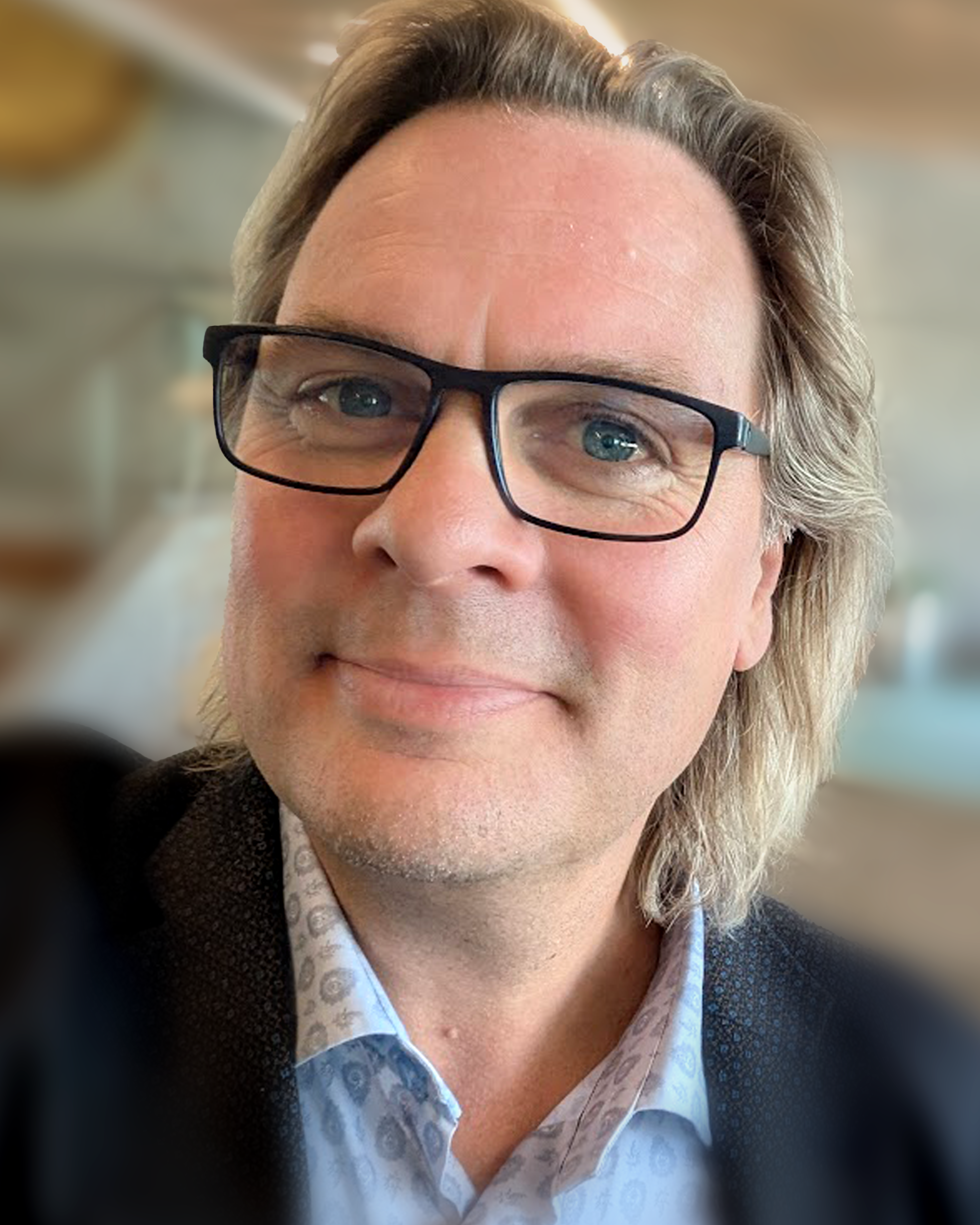
- Bowden in 2026
- Born: 1970 (age 55–56); Northampton, England
- Citizenship: Canada
- Education: Weston Favell Academy
- Occupations: Author, public speaker
- Website: truthplane.com

Mark Bowden (born 1970) is an English-Canadian author and public speaker specializing in communication, body language, and human behavior. He co-authored the 2018 book Truth and Lies: What People Are Really Thinking, which was listed as a bestseller in Canada. His techniques have been outlined in media outlets such as The Toronto Star.

== Career ==
Bowden is on the faculty of the Schulich ExecEd program at York University and the president of the National Communication Coaching Association of Canada.

Bowden is a body language analyst who provides commentary for news networks, and acts as a communication consultant for Fortune 500 executives and G8 political leaders. During US Presidential and Canadian Federal elections, he has analyzed the body language of political figures for outlets including BBC Three, CTV News, and the National Post. He has also contributed to GQ magazine on modern male culture and behavior, and has been interviewed by CNN regarding the use of body language in the workplace. Bowden's behavioral analysis has also been applied to professional sports; he was featured by The Athletic section of the New York Times to analyze the body language and non-verbal psychological tactics of elite football managers and players.

Bowden's body language methodology uses concepts from evolutionary psychology and embodied cognition. He created the "GesturePlane System," which categorizes hand gestures based on where they are held in relation to the body. Open-palm gestures made at navel height are deemed to be in the "TruthPlane," which help build trust. Conversely, gestures made below the waistline are described as being in the "Grotesque Plane," which convey negative signals.

In 2016, researchers at the Moscow State Linguistic University used Bowden's framework to study gesture levels and phonostylistics in political speeches. Journalists have also used his terminology to analyze politicians; during the 2011 Canadian federal election, The Toronto Star reported that Prime Minister Stephen Harper used TruthPlane gestures to convey trustworthiness to voters. Bowden has been interviewed as an industry consultant by publications including Popular Science.

=== The Behavior Panel ===
Bowden participates in The Behavior Panel, a collaborative YouTube channel and group of body language and human behavior experts who analyze non-verbal communication in high-profile news and true crime cases. The panel reviews video footage of public interviews and interrogations to decode behavioral cues, and their analyses have been used by local and national media outlets covering criminal investigations.

In 2024, the panel won a federal defamation lawsuit filed by Caleb Lawrence McGillivary (known as the Hatchet-Wielding Hitchhiker). McGillivary sued the group after they published a video analyzing his body language and concluding he exhibited deceptive behaviors. A federal judge dismissed the lawsuit, ruling that the panel's output was protected opinion, rather than defamation.

== Performance career ==
Bowden's stage credits include the 1992 West End premiere of Six Degrees of Separation at the Royal Court Theatre and the Comedy Theatre.

In 2003, he appeared in the Nike advertisement "Streak," directed by Frank Budgen. The commercial aired during the Super Bowl and was later ranked by Adweek as one of the top ten soccer commercials of all time.

== Bibliography ==
=== Books ===
- Mark Bowden and Tracey Thomson, Truth and Lies: What People Are Really Thinking (HarperCollins, 2018). ISBN 978-1443452090
- Mark Bowden, Tame the Primitive Brain: 28 Ways in 28 Days to Manage the Most Impulsive Behaviors at Work (Wiley, 2013). ISBN 978-1118615690
- Mark Bowden with Andrew Ford, Winning Body Language for Sales Professionals (McGraw-Hill, 2013). ISBN 978-0071793087
- Mark Bowden, Winning Body Language (McGraw-Hill, 2010). ISBN 978-0071701648

=== Selected articles ===
- Bowden, Mark; Halling, Krista B. (2026). "The Hominin-Canine Axis: A Biosemiotic Model of Co-Regulation in the Human-Dog Dyad". Biosemiotics. Springer. doi:10.1007/s12304-026-09639-z.
- Halling, Krista B.; Bowden, Mark; Pretty, Jules; Ogeer, Jennifer (2026). "Bonded Green Exercise: A One Health Framework for Shared Nature-Based Physical Activity in the Human–Dog Dyad". Animals. 16 (2): 291. doi:10.3390/ani16020291. hdl:2429/93556. PMC 12837820. PMID 41594479.
- McCaffree, Kevin; Bowden, Mark (2025). "Charisma as Directed Attentional Allocation: A Consilient Theory". SocArXiv (Preprint). doi:10.31235/osf.io/n5b9t_v1.
