= Ernest Bowden =

English cricketer

Ernest Bowden (19 June 1892 – 14 October 1972) was an English cricketer active in 1914 who played for Lancashire. He was born in Rochdale and died in Slyne with Hest. He appeared in four first-class matches as a righthanded batsman who bowled right arm fast medium pace. He scored 27 runs with a highest score of 10 and held five catches. He took 12 wickets with a best analysis of six for 78.
