= John Bowden (minister) =

English Presbyterian minister

John Bowden (died 8 January 1750) was an English Presbyterian minister.

== Life ==
While Bowden was identified, in Walter Wilson's manuscript list of dissenting academies, with the Bowden who studied under Henry Grove at Taunton, this was later taken to be an error.

Bowden was settled at Frome, Somerset, before 1700, as assistant to Humphrey Phillips, M.A. (silenced at Sherborne, Dorset, 1662, died 27 March 1707). He became sole minister on Phillips's death, and the meeting-house in Rook Lane was built for him in 1707. According to Dr. Evans's list he had a thousand hearers in 1717. Among them was Elizabeth Singer Rowe, whose funeral sermon Bowden preached in 1737. During the last nine years of his ministry Bowden was assisted successively by Alexander Houston (1741), Samuel Blyth (1742, moved to Birmingham 1746; see Bourn, Samuel, 1689-1754), Samuel Perrott, and Josiah Corrie (1750), who became his successor. There was a tablet to Bowden's memory outside the front of his meeting-house, which says that he died in 1750, and that he was "a learned man, an eloquent preacher, and a considerable poet."

Thomas Smith James referred to a trinitarian secession from his ministry. A writer in Notes and Queries' (3rd ser. iv. 431) speaks of having in his possession a letter from Anne Yerbury, of Bradford, to Bowden's widow, dated January 1749, and forwarding An Essay towards ye character of my greatly esteemed Friend, the Rev. Mr. Bowden, which contains fulsome verses in reference to his poetical powers. Samuel Bowden, M.D., known as "the poet of Frome", was probably his brother. John Bowden does not seem to have published any separate volume of poetry. He is the author of a "Hymn to the Redeemer of the World" (34 stanzas), and a "Dialogue between a Good Spirit and the Angels" (11 pages), contained in Divine Hymns and Poems on several Occasions, &c., by Philomela and several other ingenious persons, 1704. The volume is dedicated to Sir Richard Blackmore, and the preface, which is unsigned, is probably by Bowden. "Philomela" is Elizabeth Singer Rowe; she had already published under this pseudonym in 1696.

Bowden died 8 January 1750 in Frome.

== Works ==
Bowden is the author also of a few sermons:

- Sermon (1 Tim. iv. 16) at Taunton before an Assembly of Ministers, 1714.
- Sermon (Eccl. x. 16, 17) at Frome, on 20 Jan. 1714-5, 1715 (thanksgiving sermon for accession of George I).
- Exhortation, 1717, 3rd ed. 1719, charge at the ordination of Thomas Morgan at Frome, 6 September 1716, published with the ordination sermon, The Conduct of Ministers by Nicholas Billingsley, minister at Ashwick from 1710 to 1740. Morgan, who was independent minister at Bruton, Somersets, and afterwards at Marlborough (1715–26), became M.D., and was the author of The Moral Philosopher, 1738. The fact that Morgan, an independent at Marlborough, went to Frome for presbyterian ordination, is curious, and has been treated as an early indication of the theological divergences of the two bodies, but Morgan's Confession of Faith on the occasion is strongly trinitarian and Calvinistic.
- The Vanity of all Human Dependence, sermon (Ps. cxlvi. 3, 4) at Frome, 18 June, on the death of George I, 1727, dedicated to Benjamin Avery, LL.D., to whom Bowden was under "particular obligations".

Bowden was perhaps the grandfather of Joseph Bowden, "born at or near Bristol", who entered Daventry Academy under Ashworth in 1769. He was minister at Call Lane, Leeds, for over forty years, from about 1778, and author of (1) Sermons delivered to the Protestant Dissenters at Leeds, 1804; (2) Prayers and Discourses for the use of Families, in two parts, 1816.
