= Frederick Bowden-Smith =

English cricketer and clergyman

Personal information
- Full name: Frederick Hermann Bowden-Smith
- Born: 21 April 1841; Brockenhurst, Hampshire, England
- Died: 7 February 1919 (aged 77); Bournemouth, Hampshire, England
- Batting: Unknown
- Bowling: Unknown

Domestic team information
- Years: Team
- 1861: Oxford University

Career statistics
Competition	First-class
Matches	2
Runs scored	13
Batting average	13.00
100s/50s	–/–
Top score	11*
Balls bowled	103
Wickets	7
Bowling average	30.50
5 wickets in innings	–
10 wickets in match	–
Best bowling	3/?
Catches/stumpings	–/–
- Source: Cricinfo, 2 January 2020

Frederick Hermann Bowden-Smith (21 April 1841 – 7 February 1919) was an English first-class cricketer and clergyman.

The son of The Reverend Philip Bowden-Smith and Emily Robertson, he was born in April 1841 at Brockenhurst, Hampshire. He was educated at Rugby School, before going up to Trinity College, Oxford. While studying at Oxford, Bowden-Smith made two appearances in first-class cricket for Oxford University in 1861, playing against the Marylebone Cricket Club and Cambridge University. After graduating from Oxford, he became a Church of England clergyman. He held various curacies between 1864–75, before becoming the vicar of St Luke's, Southampton in 1875 and the rector of St Lawrence's Church, Weston Patrick in 1881. He died at Bournemouth in February 1919.
