= Zoë Bowden =

British physicist and instrumentation scientist

Zoë Althea Bowden MBE is a British physicist and instrumentation scientist who was involved in the construction of the ISIS Neutron and Muon Source. She was awarded an Order of the British Empire in the 2023 New Year Honours in recognition of her services to science.

== Early life and education ==
Bowden joined the Rutherford Appleton Laboratory after leaving high school. She has said that she just wanted to work in a technical role, so applied to be an Assistant Scientific Officer, a precursor to a modern apprenticeship. She was chosen to work on the Neutron Beams Unit. Here she developed the instrumentation for the Harwell linear accelerator, which was the United Kingdom's first accelerator-driven neutron source. She earned a bachelor's degree in applied physics at the London South Bank University.

== Research and career ==
From 1979 onward, Bowden was part of the construction team of the ISIS Neutron and Muon Source. She commissioned the IRIS spectrometer, a time-of-flight inverted-geometry crystal analyser spectrometer, and the Liquids and Amorphous Diffractometer. As there were so few people at ISIS at the time, she also worked on the construction of the High Energy Transfer instrument. She was the first instrument scientist.

She held various positions across ISIS, including overseeing User Support and being involved with the Mentorship programme. In 2014 she was made Head of Operations and Deputy Director. Beyond ISIS, Bowden was involved in discussions around neutron scattering on a global stage. In 2022 Bowden retired from ISIS, and joined UK Research and Innovation as a consultant on operations and safety.

In 2023, Bowden was appointed a Member of the Order of the British Empire for services to science.

== Select publications ==
- Evans, Beth; Down, Richard; Keeping, Jeff; Kirichek, Oleg; Bowden, Zoe (30 January 2008). "Cryogen-free low temperature sample environment for neutron scattering based on pulse tube refrigeration". Measurement Science and Technology. 19 (3) 034018. Bibcode:2008MeScT..19c4018E. doi:10.1088/0957-0233/19/3/034018. ISSN 0957-0233. S2CID 123585761.
- Oliver, Edward; Evans, Beth; Chowdhury, Mohammad; Major, Robert; Kirichek, Oleg; Bowden, Zoe (30 January 2008). "Novel testing chamber for neutron scattering measurements of internal stresses in engineering materials at cryogenic temperatures". Measurement Science and Technology. 19 (3) 034019. Bibcode:2008MeScT..19c4019O. doi:10.1088/0957-0233/19/3/034019. ISSN 0957-0233. S2CID 122275240.
- Ma, Yanling; Zhang, Shu Yan; Goodway, Chris; Done, Robert; Evans, Beth; Kirichek, Oleg; Bowden, Zoë (September 2012). "A non-destructive experimental investigation of elastic plastic interfaces of autofrettaged thick-walled cylindrical aluminium high pressure vessels". High Pressure Research. 32 (3): 364–375. Bibcode:2012HPR....32..364M. doi:10.1080/08957959.2012.702766. ISSN 0895-7959. S2CID 96735002.

== Personal life ==
Bowden is a bell-ringer at St Mary the Virgin, Wantage.
