= Samuel Bowden (poet) =

British writer

Samuel Bowden (fl. 1733–1761) was an English physician and poet.

Bowden, from Frome, Somerset, was the author of two volumes of poems published from 1733 to 1735. From the Gentleman's Magazine, to which he was an occasional contributor, it is deduced that he was living in 1761, while a passing mention of him in 1778 is in the past tense. The writer adds that he was a friend of Elizabeth Singer Rowe, poet, and belonged to the same communion. Bowden was therefore a nonconformist, and may be a relative of the Rev. John Bowden who preached Mrs. Rowe's funeral sermon.
