= Walter Fullwood =

English cricketer (1907–1988)

Personal information
- Full name: Walter Fullwood
- Born: 8 February 1907; Holmewood, England
- Died: 4 January 1988 (aged 80); Etchinghill, Kent, England
- Batting: Right-handed
- Role: Wicket-keeper

Domestic team information
- Years: Team
- 1946: Derbyshire
- FC debut: 15 May 1946 Derbyshire v Leicestershire
- Last FC: 22 June 1946 Derbyshire v Lancashire

Career statistics
Competition	First-class
Matches	6
Runs scored	41
Batting average	4,55
100s/50s	0/0
Top score	13
Catches/stumpings	5/1
- Source: CricketArchive, January 2012

Walter Fullwood (8 February 1907 — 4 January 1988) was an English cricketer. who played for Derbyshire in 1946.

Fullwood was born in Holmewood and during World War II played cricket frequently for the Metropolitan Police and Civil Defence Services. He joined Derbyshire at the end of the war and made his first-class debut in the 1946 season in May as wicket keeper against Leicestershire. He kept wicket in five more matches during the season but made low scores batting at the tail end. With Denis Smith and Pat Vaulkhard proving heavy hitters as well as reliable wicket-keepers, there was no place for Fullwood in the team.

Fullwood played ten innings in six first-class matches with an average of 4.55 and a top score of 13. As wicket keeper he took five catches and one wicket by stumping.

Fullwood died at Etchinghill, Kent at the age of 80.
