= Duke University Institute for Genome Sciences and Policy =

Institution at Duke University, United States

Duke Institute for Genome Sciences and Policy (IGSP) is an institution established at Duke University to address the many issues in science and policy that the Genome Revolution and recent advances in Genome Science are expected to create. It is located in the CIEMAS building at Duke University and houses some well known researchers in the genomics field including Huntington F. Willard, who is the director of the IGSP. In June 2014, IGSP was closed and transitioned to a new model of interrelated units.
