= Ken Bowden =

British-American golf writer (1930–2017)

Kenneth Harold Bowden
- Born: July 11, 1930; Brooklyn, New York, U.S.
- Died: March 5, 2017 (aged 86); Westport, Connecticut, U.S.
- Occupations: Journalist, writer
- Spouse: Jean Bowden
- Writing career
- Language: English
- Genre: Non-fiction
- Subject: Golf

Kenneth Harold Bowden (July 11, 1930 – March 5, 2017) was an American-born British journalist and golf writer. He is most known as a longtime collaborator to Jack Nicklaus on twelve of his books, including Golf My Way.
