= Susan Bulmer =

American archaeologist (1933–2016)

Sue Bulmer
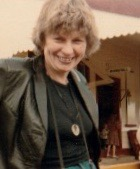
- Born: Susan Evelyn Hirsh; February 17, 1933; Ithaca, New York, US
- Died: October 6, 2016 (aged 83)
- Education: Cornell University (BA); University of Hawaii (MA); University of Auckland (MA); University of Papua New Guinea (PhD)
- Known for: First archaeologist to carry out excavations in the New Guinea Highlands
- Awards: Fulbright Scholar
- Scientific career
- Fields: Archaeology

Susan Evelyn Bulmer (née Hirsh; 17 February 1933 – 6 October 2016), known as Sue Bulmer, was a pioneering American archaeologist who worked in Papua New Guinea and New Zealand. She was the first archaeologist to carry out excavations in the New Guinea Highlands in 1959–1960 and 1967–1973.

== Early life ==
Bulmer was born in Ithaca, New York in 1933. Her parents, Freddie and Adeline Hirsch, met when they were both students at Cornell University. In 1937 the family moved to Pasadena, California, where her father was a researcher at Caltech.

== Education ==
Bulmer graduated from Cornell University with a BA majoring in anthropology in 1954. She graduated with a Master’s degree in sociology at the University of Hawaii in 1956; her thesis researched the American Samoan diaspora.

In 1956, she was awarded a Fulbright scholarship to continue her research in New Zealand. A four month long yacht trip from Hawaii through French Polynesia introduced her to the field of archaeology.

Bulmer arrived in Auckland in January 1957. Later that year, she went on a field trip to Samoa. Two archaeologists from the University of Auckland, Jack Golson and Wal Ambrose, were running an excavation in Samoa and Bulmer joined in the dig. This experience kindled her lifelong passion for archaeology.

When she returned to New Zealand, Bulmer joined excavations in the Coromandel and Canterbury. She enrolled to do a second Master’s degree in archaeology at the University of Auckland, starting in 1958. Fieldwork conducted in Papua New Guinea provided the basis of her thesis and she graduated with an MA (Archaeology) in 1966.

In 1978 Bulmer graduated with a PhD from the University of Papua New Guinea. Her thesis topic was prehistoric culture change in the Port Moresby area.

== Career ==
In 1959–1960 and 1967–1973 Bulmer carried out field research in Papua New Guinea, including excavations in the Port Moresby area and in the New Guinea Highlands, including Wanlek, Yuku and Kiowa. Bulmer’s Fruit Bat, a New Guinea megabat, discovered from fossils excavated by Bulmer, is named after her.

From 1970–72 she was on the board of the Papua New Guinea National Museum, along with fellow board member Michael Somare, later Prime Minister of Papua New Guinea.

Bulmer returned to New Zealand in 1973. While she was completing her PhD thesis she began doing site recording using students from the university, an initiative stimulated by the implementation of the Historic Places Amendment Act (1975). From the late 1970s she worked for the New Zealand Historic Places Trust (known as Heritage NZ since 2019) as Northern Regional Archaeologist. She established an archaeology unit employing more than 20 archaeologists and contract staff, providing employment and training for many students.

When the Historic Places Trust was incorporated into the newly formed Department of Conservation (DOC) in 1990, she became a DOC scientist, continuing the work begun for the Historic Places Trust.

After her retirement from DOC in 1994 she returned to her New Guinea research projects.

== Research ==
In 1964 Bulmer co-authored, with her husband Ralph Bulmer, the first paper on the prehistory of the New Guinea Highlands based on evidence from several disciplines. Bulmer’s contribution to New Guinea archaeology was commemorated in a special volume of Archaeology in Oceania in 2016. This volume includes a bibliography of Bulmer's publications spanning both her New Guinea and New Zealand work.

Her work in Papua New Guinea is recognised in three areas: as a pioneer of archaeology in the Highlands; for her classification of a coastal pottery sequence and its cultural associations and trade networks; for her investigations of early agricultural practices.

Bulmer’s wide-ranging research interests included indigenous agriculture in New Zealand and domestic animals such as the New Guinea Singing Dog.

Bulmer was active in the World Archaeology Congress, serving as Treasurer in 1990.

== Community activism ==
In the mid-1980s Bulmer co-founded the Friends of Maungawhau, a community organisation advocating for the care and management of Maungawhau, an extinct volcanic cone and historic pa site in the Auckland inner city suburb of Mt Eden. The 2014 book Maungawhau: A Short History of Volunteer Action is dedicated to Bulmer.

In 2005 she received a Living Legend award from Auckland Mayor Dick Hubbard in recognition of her community service.

== Personal life ==
Bulmer married the social anthropologist and ethnobiologist Ralph Bulmer in 1959. They had three children and divorced in 1979. In 1985 she married psychiatrist Terence (Terry) O’Meara, who was a friend from her high school days in Pasadena. The marriage lasted until his death in 2010.

== Sweat in the Sun, Mate ==
As a young woman, Bulmer was a keen folksinger, having learned to play guitar while she was a student at the University of Hawaii. She contributed her musical skills to campfire music on summer digs run by the Auckland University Archaeological Society in 1957–60.

In 1967 an LP recording, Sweat in the Sun Mate, was produced to commemorate the music sessions. Bulmer sang on several tracks, including her original composition, "Hi Jolly", a humorous ballad about a notorious fossicker who was always one step ahead of the archaeologists.
