= Breck Bowden =

American environmental scientist

- Born: William Breckenridge Bowden; 1951 (age 74–75)
- Scientific career
- Fields: Environmental science

William Breckenridge "Breck" Bowden (/ˈboʊdən/; born 1951) is an American environmental scientist, currently the Robert and Genevieve Patrick Professor of Watershed Science & Planning and Director of the Vermont Water Resources and Lake Science Center, Rubenstein School of Environment and Natural Resources, University of Vermont, and also a published author. He received his bachelor's degree in chemistry and zoology from the University of Georgia and his master's and PhD from North Carolina State University.

Bowden retired on August 31, 2022.
