= Samuel Bowden (cricketer) =

Australian cricketer

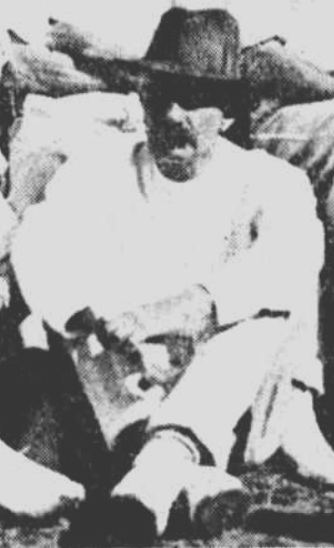

Personal information
- Born: 29 September 1867; Sydney, Australia
- Died: 25 August 1945 (aged 77); Sydney, Australia
- Source: Cricinfo, 1 October 2020

Samuel Bowden (29 September 1867 – 25 August 1945) was an Australian cricketer. He played in one first-class match for Queensland in 1893/94.

Bowden began his cricket career in New South Wales playing for Ivanhoe and he went on to play for Balmain District for many years. In junior cricket he was called a "lady bowler" by teammates as he bowled "gentle slows" and he was also described as getting remarkable spin from leg and having a strong defence as a batsman. He moved to Queensland at some point where he played for the Graziers Club in Brisbane cricket and he represented the State in First-class cricket against New South Wales in 1894. In 1895 he visited Sydney and it was noted he had shaved his beard with a local paper speculating it was due to the hot weather in Brisbane. By 1899 Bowden had returned to Sydney where he was playing for South Sydney.

In 1917, Bowden became honorary publicity organizer for the war chest fund, and he was still serving in the role as of 1919. After his cricket career Bowden travelled across southern Europe where he visited many churches, particularly in Italy, and studied the arts. In 1929 he became President of the Sydney-based Shakespeare Society.

== See also ==
- List of Queensland first-class cricketers
