= Vivian Lee Bowden =

Author and researcher

D. Vivian Lee Bowden
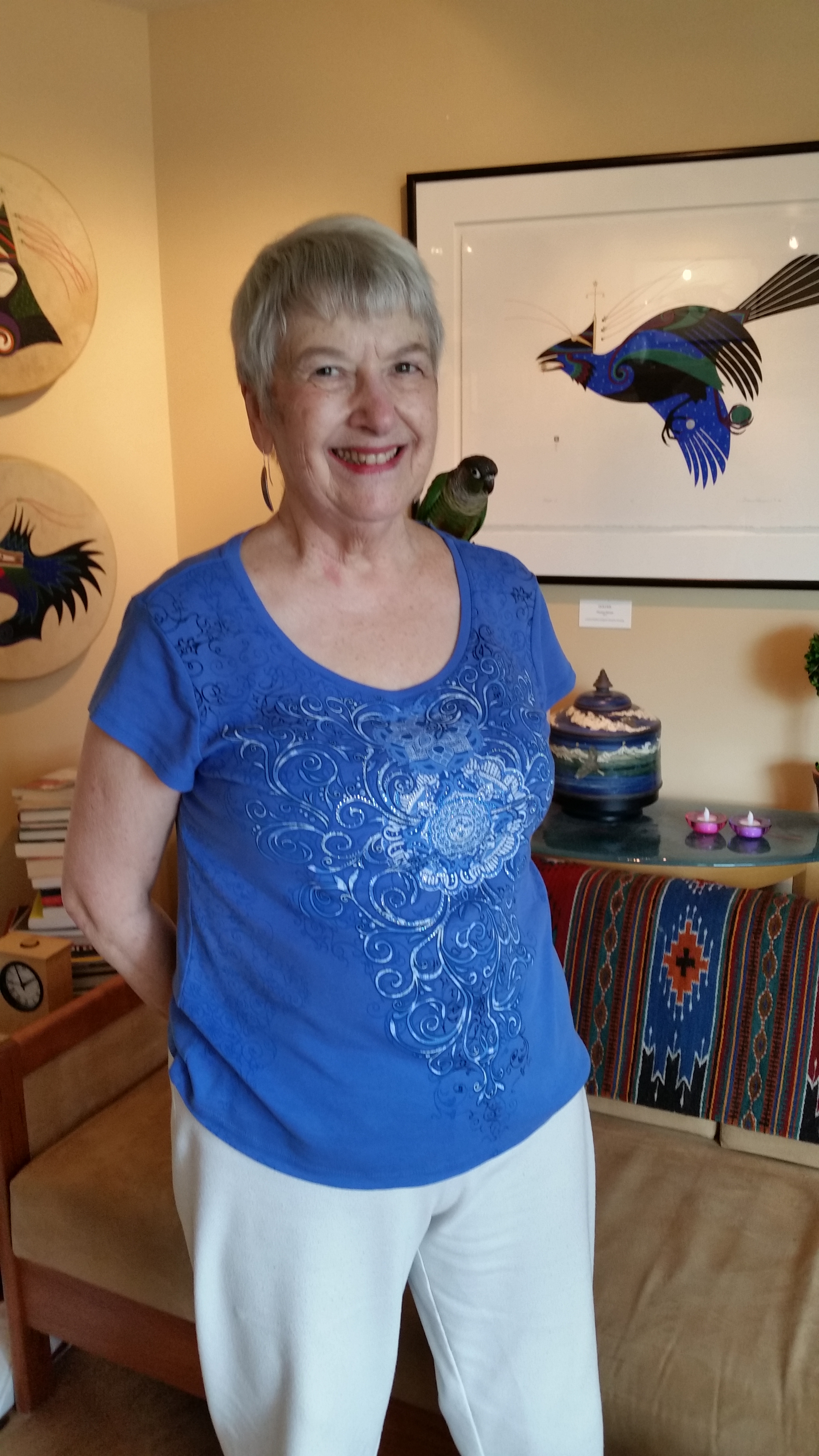
- Vivian Lee Bowden in her Seattle home, 2014
- Born: February 23, 1943; Washington, D.C., U.S.
- Died: January 9, 2017 (aged 73); Seattle, Washington U.S.
- Known for: research and writing on the garden strawberry
- Spouse: Douglas M. Bowden

D. Vivian Lee Bowden (February 23, 1943 – January 9, 2017) was an American science journalist. She discovered the unpublished drawings of early French botanist Antoine Nicolas Duchesne and authored an influential history of the garden strawberry. Her extensive research conducted in both Europe and America has been widely cited.

== Life and education ==
D. Vivian Lee was born in Washington DC, on February 23, 1943. She received her BS from Stanford University and her MS from Columbia School of Journalism. Before marriage, she worked as a science journalist for Life magazine. She married Douglas M. Bowden in New York, NY in 1966. Lee Bowden resumed her education after raising a family, and earned a Master of Divinity from the Pacific School of Religion in Berkeley, California.

== Research ==
Lee conducted extensive research in her work on the historical background of the strawberry. At the behest of Henry A. Wallace, Lee visited France, Germany and the Netherlands in summer 1962 to research the history of the garden strawberry. On July 10, 1962, she discovered in the Paris Jardin des Plantes a collection of 73 original drawings of Fragaria by Antoine Nicolas Duchesne. Duchesne prepared these for use in his monumental book describing strawberry history, taxonomy, and cultivation. Due to budgetary constraints, the drawings were not published, and were overlooked for almost 200 years. The drawings provide significant historical context for the pioneering work of Duchesne. Lee made her discovery at age 19, the same age that Duchesne published his book.

Lee presented her findings in an invited talk at a national meeting, and wrote four chapters on the history of strawberry for the positively reviewed and widely cited book The Strawberry: History, Breeding and Physiology. Her contribution is clearly acknowledged in the preface, but not on the title page, and most subsequent authors have misattributed the chapters to George M. Darrow, a USDA strawberry geneticist. In his discussion of the nomenclature of the garden strawberry, taxonomist M. Guédès alludes to the thoroughness of her scholarship, and properly cites her contribution.
