= James B. Dozier =

American civilian scout

- Born: May 2, 1820; Warren County, Tennessee
- Died: 1901 (aged 80–81)
- Burial place: Jack County, Texas
- Military career
- Allegiance: United States
- Branch: United States Army (civilian scout)
- Rank: Scout
- Conflicts: Indian Wars
- Awards: Medal of Honor

James Bell Dozier, also known as James Doshier, was born in Warren County, Tennessee on May 2, 1820, and died in 1901.

He is one of only eight civilian recipients of the Medal of Honor. As a civilian scout during the Indian Wars, he received the award "for gallantry in action and on the march." This occurred in 1870 at the Little Wichita River in Texas during a battle with the Keechi.

== Revocation and reinstatement of the Medal of Honor ==
In 1917, the U.S. Army—after Congress revised the standards for the award—removed from the rolls 911 medals previously awarded to civilians or for actions that would not warrant a Medal of Honor under the new higher standards. Dozier's medal was among those revoked. In 1977, Congress began reviewing numerous cases; it reinstated the medals for Dozier and four other civilian scouts on June 12, 1989.

== See also ==
- List of Medal of Honor recipients for the Indian Wars
