= John Bowden (linguist) =

Australian linguist

- Born: John Frederick Bowden; 1958 (age 67–68); Australia
- Occupation: Linguist

Academic work
- Main interests: Austronesian and Papuan linguistics

John Frederick Bowden (born 1958 in Australia) is a linguist who specializes in Austronesian and Papuan linguistics. His main research interests are the languages of eastern Indonesia and Timor-Leste.

== Education ==
Bowden obtained his bachelor's and master's degrees in linguistics at the University of Auckland. He did his doctoral studies at the University of Melbourne, where he wrote a grammatical description of the Taba language for his dissertation (Taba [Makian Dalam]: Description of an Austronesian language from Eastern Indonesia, 1997).

== Career ==
Together with researchers from the Indonesian Institute of Sciences (Lembaga Ilmu Pengetahuan Indonesia), he documented the Gamkonora language, a Papuan language of Halmahera. He has done research on non-standard Malay lingua francas such as North Moluccan Malay and the dialect of Jakarta. Also, Bowden has extensively studied South Halmahera languages, especially on linguistic typology, language contact, and grammar.

He was a postdoctoral researcher at the Max Planck Institute for Psycholinguistics. For about 10 years, he was a researcher at the Australian National University. He was also employed as a local director of the Jakarta Field Station of the Linguistics Department of the Max Planck Institute of Evolutionary Anthropology.

== Selected works ==
Selected works by John Bowden:

- Behind the Preposition: The Grammaticalization of Locatives in Oceanic Languages (1992)
- Taba: Description of a South Halmahera Language (2001)
- A Journey through Austronesian and Papuan Cultural and Linguistic Space (2010)
