= Samuel Bowden (Medal of Honor) =

United States Army Medal of Honor Recipient

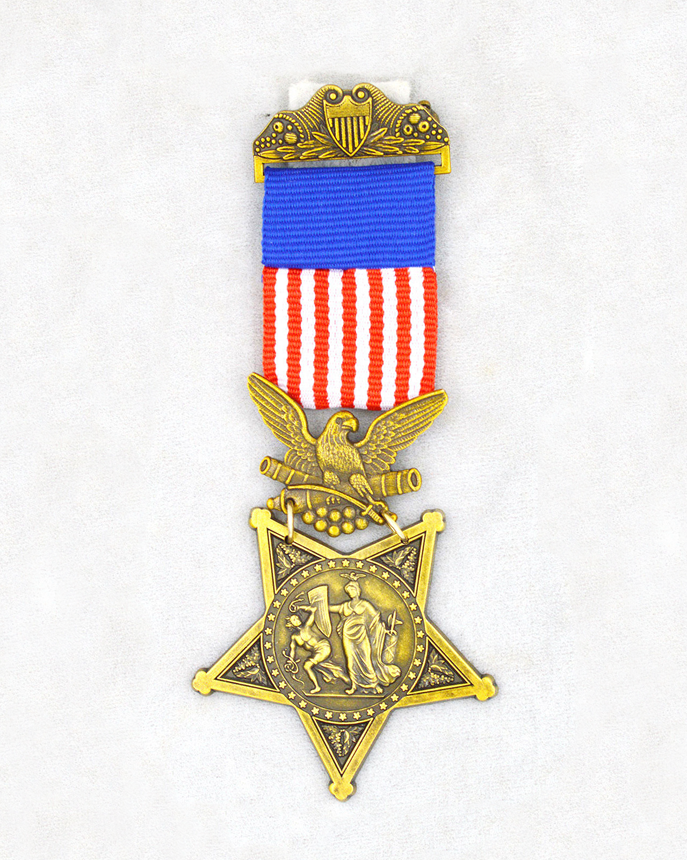
- Army Medal of Honor, 1862–1895
- Born: c. 1846; Salem, Massachusetts, US
- Died: unknown
- Burial place: unknown
- Military career
- Branch: United States Army
- Rank: Corporal
- Unit: 6th Cavalry Regiment
- Conflicts: Indian Wars
- Awards: Medal of Honor

Samuel Bowden (born c. 1846) was a corporal in the United States Army who received the Medal of Honor for his actions during the Indian Wars.

Samuel was born in Salem, Massachusetts, in 1846. He was a corporal in Company M, 6th US Cavalry when he displayed actions near the Wichita River, Texas, that would earn him the Medal of Honor. The citation reads:

Citation:

Gallantry in pursuit of and fight with Indians.

Samuel received the Medal of Honor on November 19, 1870, and the date of his death is unknown, as well as his final resting place.

== See also ==
- List of Medal of Honor recipients
- List of Medal of Honor recipients for the Indian Wars
