= Bulmer (surname) =

Bulmer is a surname. Notable people with the surname include:

- Bulmer (family), English family
- Agnes Bulmer (1775–1836), English poet
- Alex Bulmer, Canadian theatre artist
- Andrew Bulmer, Australian rugby league footballer
- April Bulmer (born 1963), Canadian poet
- Bevis Bulmer (1536–1615), mining engineer and speculator
- Billy Bulmer (1881–1936), English public servant and rugby league footballer
- Brett Bulmer (born 1992), Canadian ice hockey player
- Ernest Bulmer (1900–1967), British Army officer and physician
- Eryn Bulmer (born 1976), Canadian diver
- Esmond Bulmer (born 1935), former British Conservative MP
- George William Bulmer (1898–1987), American-born Canadian World War I flying ace
- Joan Bulmer (1519–1590), English gentlewoman and courtier
- John Bulmer of Wilton (1481–1537), rebel in the Pilgrimage of Grace
- John Bulmer (Independent minister) (1784–1857), English minister
- John Bulmer (cricketer) (1867–1917), English cricketer
- John Bulmer (born 1938), English photographer and filmmaker
- Josephine Bulmer (born 1996), Australian canoeist
- Kenneth Bulmer (1912–2005), prolific British author
- Kevin Bulmer (1962–2011), English artist, game designer, and graphic designer
- Margaret Cheyne Bulmer (died 1537), rebel in the Pilgrimage of Grace
- Martin Bulmer (born 1943), British sociologist
- Michael Bulmer (born 1931), British biostatistician
- Peter Bulmer (born 1965), English footballer
- Ralph Bulmer (soldier), (died 1558), English soldier
- Ralph Bulmer (1928–1988), New Zealand anthropologist
- Roscoe Carlyle Bulmer (1874–1919), American naval officer
- Roz Bulmer (born 1979), English darts player
- Susan Bulmer (1933–2016), American archaeologist
- T. F. Bulmer, Victorian compiler of directories
- Tahita Bulmer (born 1981), English singer-songwriter
- Ted Bulmer (1889– 1953), Australian rules footballer
- William Bulmer (disambiguation)
