= Bulmer =

Bulmer may refer to:

== People ==
- Bulmer (surname)
- Bulmer (family), an English family
- Bulmer (directories), a Victorian era historian, surveyor and compiler of directories

== Places ==
- Bulmer, Essex, England
- Bulmer, North Yorkshire, England

== Other uses ==
- Bulmer (typeface), an English transitional classification serif typeface
- H. P. Bulmer, English cider manufacturer
- Bulmer (1809 ship) - a British merchant ship damaged in a hurricane and condemned at Sadras in 1821
- USS Bulmer, a United States Navy Clemson-class destroyer (named after Captain Roscoe Carlyle Bulmer USN) that was launched in 1920 and saw service during WW2.

== See also ==
- Bulmers (Republic of Ireland), Irish cider manufacturer
