= Broad front versus narrow front controversy in World War II =

Wartime debate among Allies

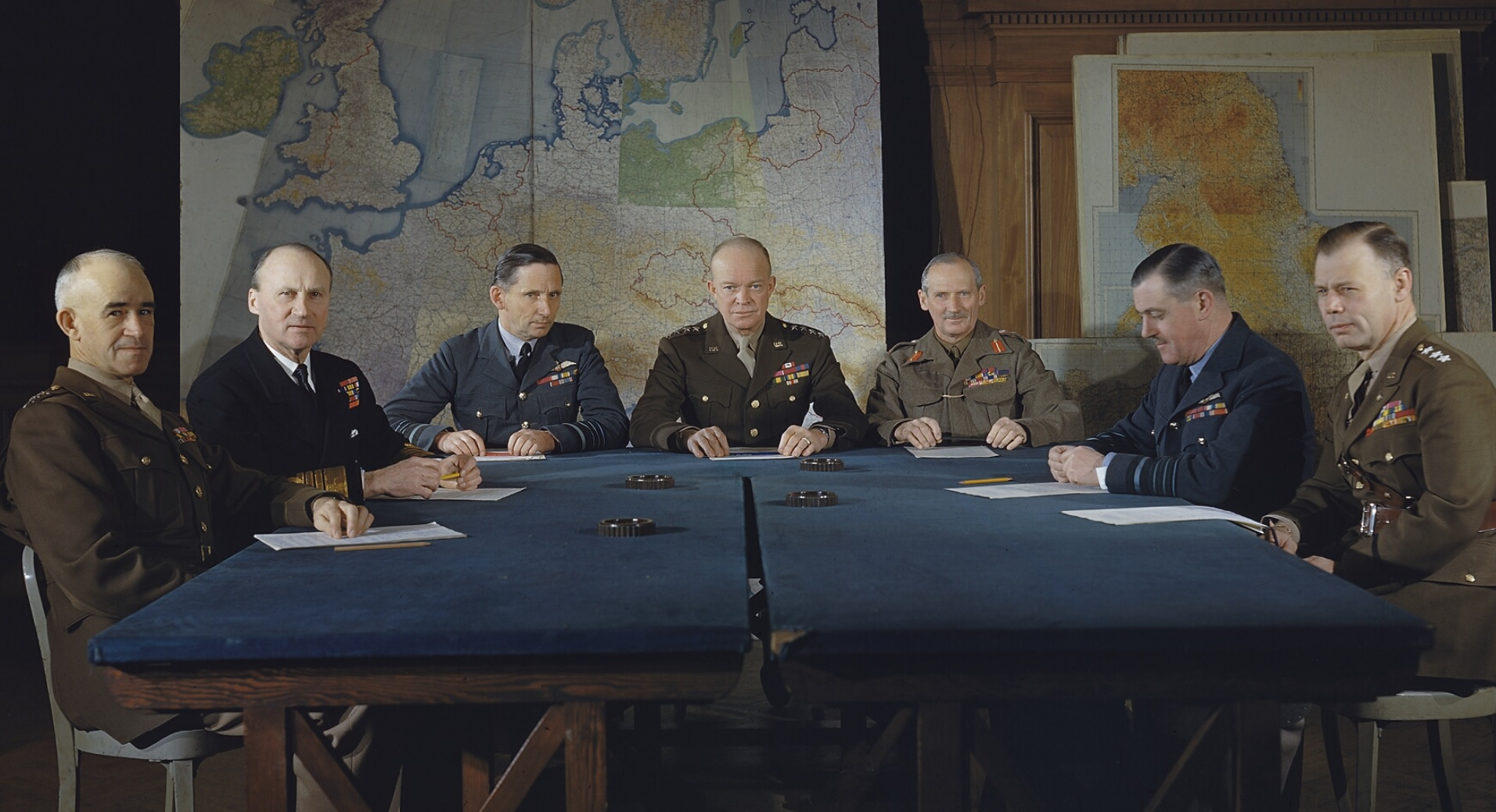
Senior Allied commanders in February 1944. Left to right: Lieutenant General Omar Bradley; Admiral Sir Bertram Ramsay; Air Chief Marshal Sir Arthur Tedder; General Dwight D. Eisenhower; General Sir Bernard Montgomery, Commander in Chief 21st Army Group; Air Chief Marshal Sir Trafford Leigh-Mallory; and Lieutenant General Walter Bedell Smith

The broad front versus narrow front controversy in World War II arose after General Dwight D. Eisenhower, the Supreme Allied Commander, decided to advance into Germany on a broad front in 1944, against the suggestions of his principal subordinates, Lieutenant Generals Omar Bradley and George S. Patton and Field Marshal Sir Bernard Montgomery, who argued instead to stage competing advances on narrow fronts. The decision was controversial initially because the British government wanted to raise the profile of the minority British contingent in what was by then an overwhelmingly American army, and they perceived that a British-led thrust to Berlin would achieve this aim. Montgomery's strident advocacy raised political and nationalistic complications that strained the wartime alliance. During the subsequent Cold War, suggestions were made that the Soviet presence in Eastern Europe might have been reduced had Eisenhower sent a narrow-front thrust to race the USSR to Berlin in 1945.

Eisenhower's decision was based on both political and military factors. There were serious reservations in the autumn of 1944 about whether the Allied logistical system could support the narrow-front strategy, because at that time there were insufficient working ports to support large formations far from the coast, the road and rail transport network was already under severe strain, and there were concerns about being able to protect the narrow supply lines deep into enemy territory, through terrain that included crossing many rivers, in weather which hampered air support. In addition the Allied occupation zones in Germany had been agreed upon in February 1944, and a faster Allied advance in the autumn of 1944 would not have altered this. The Soviet Union would have also benefited from a rapid German collapse, and its participation in the war against Japan was greatly desired. The staff at Eisenhower's Supreme Headquarters Allied Expeditionary Force (SHAEF) considered Montgomery's proposed advance on the Ruhr and Berlin and Bradley's proposed advance on Metz and the Saar, and assessed both to be feasible, but only on the assumptions that the port of Antwerp was brought rapidly into service, that considerable additional air, rail and road transportation became available, and that the other Allied armies were already poised on the German border. These assumptions were not met until very late in the year, by which time circumstances had changed. If the narrow front advance had failed, the consequences would have been severe.

The British historian A. J. P. Taylor credited Chester Wilmot's The Struggle For Europe (1952) as the work that "launched the myths that Eisenhower prevented Montgomery from winning the war in 1944". Few historians on either side of the Atlantic accept ending the war in 1944 was possible. "Wilmot's book", American historian Maurice Matloff wrote, "must be taken for what it represents—a suggestive, provocative work on the war written from a British point of view in a period of disenchantment." Montgomery's Chief of Staff, Major-General Freddie de Guingand, stated in his post-war account that he had opposed Montgomery's narrow front strategy on political and administrative grounds, but Montgomery's wartime Chief Administrative Officer, Major-General Miles Graham defended his contention that the narrow front advance was logistically feasible.

== Background ==
On D-Day, 6 June 1944, the western Allies of World War II launched Operation Overlord, the invasion of Normandy. They achieved tactical and operational surprise, and established a lodgement. In the weeks that followed, the Germans made skillful use of the difficult and defensible terrain of the bocage country, and the initial Allied advance was slower and more costly than anticipated.

A storm on 19 to 21 June wrecked one of the two quickly-built Mulberry Harbours, the one at Omaha Beach. In addition, this gave a foretaste of the devastation which the autumn gales could bring. There was a genuine prospect of a World War I-style stalemate developing if the German defenders could hold out until then. However the German decision to hold on in Normandy also allowed the Allies to employ their superiority in firepower, subjecting the Germans to casualties and destruction of equipment on a scale that they could not replace, thereby making their ultimate defeat in Normandy inevitable.

On 25 July, the Allies launched Operation Cobra, and broke out from the lodgement in Normandy. By mid-August 1944 the Germans were in full retreat, and were also retreating on other fronts; including in Southern France, where the Allies had landed on the French Riviera; in Italy, where the Germans were falling back from Rome to the Gothic Line; and in Belarus, where German Army Group Centre had been destroyed by Soviet offensive Operation Bagration.

The US First Army completed the Liberation of Paris on 25 August 1944, assisted by the French Resistance and French General Philippe Leclerc's 2nd French Armored Division. Montgomery's offensive jumped off on 29 August. While the First Canadian Army under Lieutenant-General Harry Crerar invested the French Channel ports of Dieppe and Le Havre, Brussels was liberated on 4 September 1944 by the British 21st Army Group. Dempsey's British Second Army advanced 400 kilometres (250 mi) across France and Belgium to capture the port of Antwerp largely intact on 4 September, but the Germans still controlled the approaches to the port, so its opening was dependent on clearing the Scheldt estuary, and it was not expected to be operational before 1 November. In September 1944 the Western Allies had reached Germany's western border, which was protected by the extensive Siegfried Line.

The Operation Overlord plan had been formulated in April 1944 by SHAEF planning staff, which consisted of three British officers: Captain P. N. Walker from the Royal Navy, Brigadier Kenneth McLean from the British Army, and Group Captain Harold Broad from the Royal Air Force. When addressing the eventual invasion of Germany itself, they considered but initially rejected the concept of an advance north of the Ardennes, as the rivers would restrict the advance to a narrow front as it approached the Rhine, and the many rivers would restrict the use of armour. On the other hand, an advance on Metz would be over country suitable for armour, but thereafter would encounter increasingly rugged terrain, and would not threaten the Ruhr industrial area. In their 3 May report to Eisenhower's Chief of Staff, Lieutenant General Walter Bedell Smith, they recommended a main advance on the Ruhr to the north of the Ardennes, coupled with a subsidiary advance to the south towards Metz.

The plan was based on the assumption that the Germans would successively defend each of the major rivers across France and Belgium. Furthermore, the original plans had assumed a steady rate of advance against resistance, rather than the rapid pursuit of a disorganized enemy, and this assumption formed the basis of logistic preparations. In addition, it was originally planned to pause for about a month at the River Seine, in order to develop an administrative base to support further offensives. In reality the advance was much slower than anticipated for the first seven weeks, as the Allied forces struggled to break out of the Normandy beachhead, and to gain the use of the port of Cherbourg. Thereafter the spectacular drive of early August greatly accelerated the advance to the enemy's border, but the lines of communications could not be developed fast enough to keep up. Railways and pipelines could not be extended quickly enough, and the motor transport facilities struggled to supply even the minimum needs of the advancing armies.

Eisenhower assumed personal command of all land forces on 1 September. Under his direct command fell the US 12th Army Group, which became active on 1 August. The 12th Army Group was commanded by Lieutenant General Omar Bradley, and it controlled the US First Army, under the command of Lieutenant General Courtney Hodges, and the US Third Army, under the command of Lieutenant General George S. Patton Jr. Also under Eisenhower's direct command fell the British 21st Army Group, commanded by General Sir Bernard Montgomery. The 21st Army Group controlled the British Second Army, under the command of Lieutenant-General Miles Dempsey, and the First Canadian Army under the command of Canadian Lieutenant General Harry Crerar.

At SHAEF optimism gave way to euphoria, and there was a conviction that the Siegfried Line (Westwall) would soon be overrun. In October and November 1918, Germany had sued for peace after it had suffered a series of battlefield defeats and its allies had defected. The situation in September 1944 looked very similar. On 5 September Eisenhower wrote in a memo that: "The defeat of the German armies is complete, and the only thing now needed to realize the whole conception is speed. Our rapidity of movement will depend on maintenance, in which we are now stretched to the limit."

On 4 September Eisenhower told Bradley to ensure that the main effort was made north of Ardennes, but it was not Eisenhower's habit to issue explicit directives to his army group commanders; he preferred to issue statements of his intent and allow the army commanders to implement them according to the situation on the ground. Eisenhower relented on 5 September, and agreed that Patton's advance could continue. Bradley continued to support Patton's advance to the extent of starving First Army units of fuel, and allocating Third Army two divisions released from the front in Brittany. This resulted in Eisenhower issuing a more explicit statement of his intent on 13 September. Patton crossed the Meuse on 14 September, but by the end of the month both First Army and Third Army had been halted short of their objectives.

Like his American counterparts, Montgomery's primary mission was to defeat Germany as quickly as possible, but as the senior British commander in north west Europe, he also operated under political pressure to achieve two other objectives. The first was that, given Britain's precarious economy and manpower situation, a victory in 1944 was preferable to one in 1945. He was therefore inclined to grasp at the most tenuous prospect of this, whereas Eisenhower was more ready to accept that it was unachievable. At a press conference on 15 August 1944, Eisenhower told reporters that anybody who thought the war would be over soon was "crazy". Eisenhower stated that Hitler knew he would be executed when the war ended, so he thus expected Hitler would fight to the bitter end, and that most of his troops would fight on with him.

In addition, there was a grand strategy imperative that Britain be seen to be playing a vital part in the campaign if it was to have any say in the reconstruction of the post-war world. Montgomery's stature was an integral part of that. Britain may have entered the war as a great power, but by 1944 its status was greatly diminished. Suffering heavy losses in Normandy would diminish British leadership and prestige globally, and in post-war Europe in particular. The fewer the number of combat-experienced divisions the British Army had left at the end of the war, the smaller Britain's influence in the reconstruction of Europe was likely to be, compared to the emerging superpowers of the US and the USSR. Montgomery was thus caught in a dilemma—the British Army needed to be seen to be pulling at least half the weight in the liberation of Western Europe, but without incurring the heavy casualties that such a role would inevitably produce. The 21st Army Group scarcely possessed sufficient forces to achieve such a military prominence, and the remaining divisions had to be expended sparingly.

Montgomery's solution to the dilemma was to lobby to be reappointed as commander of Allied land forces until the end of the war, so that any victory attained on the Western front—although achieved primarily by American formations—would accrue in part to him and thus to Britain. He would also be able to ensure that British units were spared some of the high-attrition actions, but would be most prominent when the final blows were struck. When that strategy failed, he lobbied Eisenhower to put some American formations under the control of the 21st Army Group, so as to bolster his resources while still maintaining the outward appearance of successful British effort.

== Logistical considerations ==
Ruppenthal wrote that the adherents to single-thrust theories underestimate the factor of logistics, which strongly influenced the initial strategic planning as well as the conduct of the battle. General Eisenhower's decision in mid-September 1944 to pursue a "broad-front strategy" was based largely on considerations of logistics. Initially it was logical to pursue the opportunities offered by the disintegration of enemy resistance, but the available transport was unable to deliver even daily needs, far less to stock advance supply depots. By 12 September (D-Day plus 98) the Allied armies had advanced to a point which they had not expected to reach until D-Day plus 350. Between 25 August and 12 September they had made 260 days of planned-progress in 19 days. Much larger forces were thus being maintained at much greater distances than was initially contemplated at that point of the war. In addition the city of Paris had been liberated 55 days ahead of schedule, and the needs to those civilians were added to the demand on supplies.

On 3 August Montgomery sent the US VIII Corps to take Brittany, saying "I feel that will be enough." The US 6th Armored Division reached Brest by 7 August. Brest was heavily armed and fortified, and was defended by approximately 30,000 German troops, including the elite 2nd Paratroop Division. Brest was finally captured on 20 September, at a cost of about 10,000 American casualties. The city of Brest was totally destroyed, and the Germans had thoroughly demolished the port. The river channel was blocked, the wharves and cranes and breakwaters had been ruined, and ships had been scuttled in the harbour. The smaller Breton port of St. Malo had been captured by 2 September 1944, but the Germans had also destroyed the port beyond hope of immediate repair.

Eisenhower decided on 7 September to cancel Operation Chastity, the development of an artificial port in Brittany, and on 9 September determined that none of the Brittany ports were needed. This left the Americans wholly dependent upon the increasingly distant port of Cherbourg and the Normandy beaches. With the rehabilitation of the railways and construction of pipelines unable to keep up with the pace of the advance, American logistics in the Northern France campaign depended on motor transport. Yet even before Operation Cobra began, there was a shortage of trucks, especially of the large semi-trailers that were especially suitable for long-distance haulage. Expedients like the Red Ball Express came at a high price. Tires and other parts wore out, and vehicles were run without proper maintenance. Dry batteries, lack of oil, and loose nuts and bolts caused breakdowns. Driver fatigue was another important factor; round trips sometimes went for 48 to 65 hours. By the end of September, 5,750 vehicles required major repairs.

By the middle of August it was no longer possible to maintain in combat all the available divisions, and by early September three divisions had been immobilized so that their transport could be reallocated to form provisional truck companies. It was estimated that no more than twenty divisions could be maintained in combat as far forward as the Rhine by 1 October. Bad weather would soon reduce the capacity of the beach landing zones even further. It was thus accepted that the Saar and Ruhr areas were at the absolute maximum distance at which Allied forces could be supported for the time being, and that "a power thrust deep into Germany" could not be attempted without additional logistic capacity.

By mid-September the US First Army was fighting at Aachen inside the German border, more than 200 miles beyond Paris. The original planning had not anticipated reaching that area until May 1945, so it had become necessary to support a huge force at this substantial distance approximately 230 days earlier than originally planned.

The decision to continue the pursuit beyond the Seine stretched the American logistical system to breaking point, and had long-term and far-reaching effects in the form of the attrition of equipment, failure to establish a proper supply depot system, neglect of the development of ports, and inadequate stockpiles in forward areas. That the American advance came to a halt in early September was not due to a shortage of fuel; the problem was one of delivering it to where it was needed. By September, with the weather starting to deteriorate, the Communications Zone was warning that it could not provide enough resources to maintain more than one army, and then only at the expense of deferring the construction of advance airfields, the winterisation of clothing and equipment, and the replacement of damaged and worn-out materiel. Since the Ruhr was the most important objective, this entailed halting Patton's Third Army.

Eisenhower had initially been willing to defer the capture of the Brittany ports in favor of advancing rapidly to encircle and destroy the German Seventh Army, which would otherwise have subsequently been able to delay the Allied advance, and again when he decided to cross the Seine immediately and continue to drive the disintegrating German formations eastward to the German border. However such deferments were no longer permissible, in view of the impending bad weather with its anticipated impact on the landing of supplies over the beaches, as well as the hardening of German resistance in prepared defensive positions.

By 9 September the Brittany ports were 400 to 500 miles behind the front lines, and Eisenhower had decided that the Brittany ports (apart from Brest) were no longer essential to support the US armies. Logistics planners had suggested in early September that US port development resources should rather be used in developing the ports north of the Seine.

At the end of September the Communications Zone clearly confirmed the impossibility of supporting large-scale operations east of the Rhine. The Communications Zone did not expect its port and transportation situation to improve sufficiently until mid-November, and that large-scale operations would not be possible until the port of Antwerp and adequate railway infrastructure became available.

== Montgomery's proposal ==
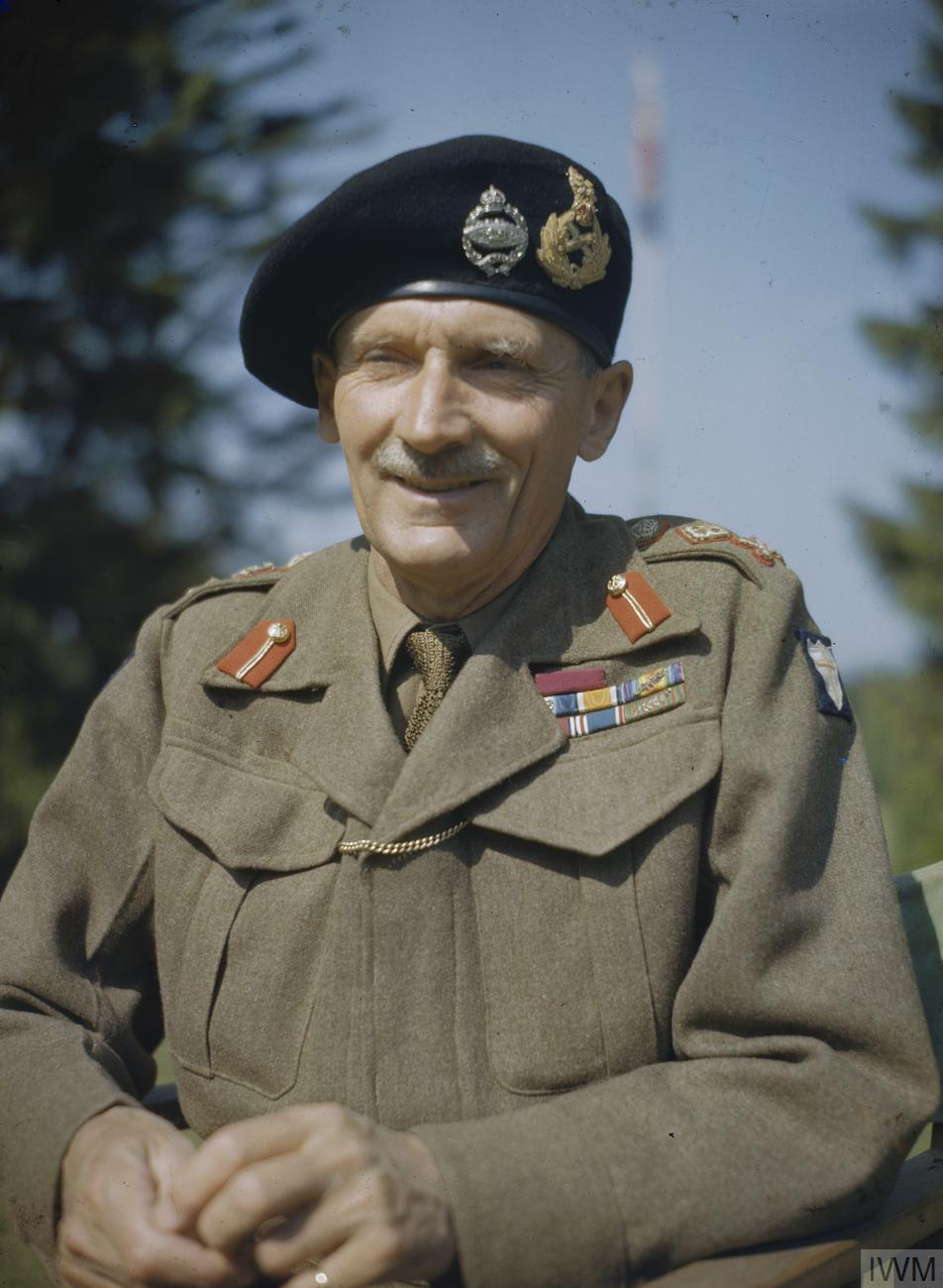
General Sir Bernard Montgomery

On 17 August Montgomery flew from his headquarters at Le Bény-Bocage to see Bradley at 12th Army Group headquarters at Fougères. Montgomery outlined a concept to Bradley whereby the Overlord plan would be set aside, and the 12th and 21st Army Groups kept together to advance north of the Ardennes. Montgomery later described this as the Schlieffen Plan in reverse. At the time Montgomery thought that Bradley agreed with his proposal. The following day Montgomery cabled the Chief of the Imperial General Staff, Field Marshal Sir Alan Brooke:

Have been thinking about future plans but have not (repeat not) discussed the subject with Ike [Eisenhower]. My views are as follows. After crossing the Seine 12 and 21 Army groups should keep together as a solid mass of some 40 divisions which would be so strong that it need fear nothing. This force should move northwards, 21 Army Group should be on the western flank, and should clear the Channel coast and the Pas de Calais and Western Flanders and secure Antwerp. The American armies should move on Ardennes, directed on Brussels, Aachen and Cologne. The movement of the American armies would cut the communications of enemy forces on the Channel coast and thus facilitate the task of British Army Group. The initial objects of the movement would be to destroy German forces on the coast and to establish a powerful air force in Belgium. A further object would be to get enemy out of V-1 or V-2 range of England. Bradley agrees with above conception. Would be glad to know if you agree generally. When I have your reply will discuss matter with Ike.

Eisenhower agreed to meet with Montgomery for lunch on 23 August at the latter's headquarters, which was now at Condé-sur-Noireau. Montgomery pitched his proposal to Eisenhower, warning that—in his opinion—failure to take advantage of the favourable operational situation would result in the war in Europe continuing well into 1945. Montgomery contended that the 21st Army Group needed the assistance of at least twelve American divisions, and to provide the logistical support for them, he recommended that Patton's Third Army be halted. In August and September 1944, the US First Army consisted of nine divisions, so giving up twelve would have meant handing over the entire army to Montgomery.

== Bradley's proposal ==
When Montgomery saw Bradley again on 19 August, Bradley informed him that he was considering a concept of Patton's, whereby the main effort of the 12th Army Group would be south of the Ardennes, towards Metz and the Saar. While Bradley acknowledged the value of the Ruhr, he contended that instead of First Army encircling it from the south with a crossing of the Rhine near Cologne like Montgomery recommended, it would be preferable to undertake a wider envelopment of the Ruhr with Third Army crossing in the vicinity of Frankfurt. Even more so than Eisenhower, Bradley was a proponent of the broad front doctrine taught at Fort Leavenworth. Since he considered that the German Army in the West had been completely defeated, he saw no reason to halt Patton's drive on the Saar, which he saw as providing a tactical windfall.

== Eisenhower's response ==
In the first days of September, both US Third Army and 21st Army Group were convinced that the war could be shortened if they were given priority in supply.

In late August SHAEF investigated the possibility of the Third Army making a quick drive across the Rhine, and perhaps inducing an immediate surrender. This was considered to be feasible, but only by giving Third Army priority on all available supplies, including extensive use of air transport, and immobilising all other forces. Even then the force could only be supported for a short distance beyond the Rhine, and it would be a relatively small force compared with the defending German Army. Such an advance would have created exposed flanks and lines of communication of approximately 300 miles through enemy territory, air cover would have been difficult to maintain, and support from other Allied divisions would not have been available due to their own logistical shortages. The area to be occupied included neither the political nor economic heart of Germany. The required concentration of resources would have required the postponement of any attempt to capture the port of Antwerp, without which further operations could not be supported. Finally, if the Germans did not immediately surrender, the operation would result in disaster. The chance of success was small, and the consequences of failure would have very serious implications for future operations. Eisenhower decided against authorising a narrow thrust by the US Third Army.

At the same time SHAEF investigated the possibility of an attack along the northern route, which would lead most directly to the industrial Ruhr, and then on to Berlin. The terrain in the north was better suited to the use of tanks, it was closer to the Channel ports and it was better supported by functioning road and rail networks. However, the logistics were still insufficient. Success on the northern route was predicated on both Allied army groups reaching the Rhine by 15 September, on the Allies having the port of Antwerp in operation, and on considerable air, rail and road transportation being available. Since these assumptions could not be achieved, the northern narrow thrust clearly was also logistically unfeasible. In addition it was felt that only three divisions could actually be supported as far forward as Berlin, and even then only on reduced maintenance.

On 23 August Montgomery pitched his narrow-front proposal to Eisenhower, contending that the 21st Army Group needed the assistance of at least twelve American divisions, and recommending that Patton's Third Army be halted. Eisenhower listened, but decided to persist with the broad front strategy. The 12th Army Group would assist Montgomery's drive north of the Ardennes, but its main effort would be towards Metz and the Saar.

A two-part message from Eisenhower to Montgomery on 5 September arrived at Montgomery's headquarters in reverse order on 7 and 9 September. It read in part:

1. While agreeing with your conception of a powerful and full-blooded thrust towards Berlin, I do not agree that it should be initiated at this moment to the exclusion of all other maneuvers...
2. We must immediately exploit our success by promptly breaching the Siegfried Line, crossing the Rhine on a wide front, and seizing the Saar and the Ruhr...
3. While we are advancing, we will be opening the ports of Havre and Antwerp, which are essential to sustain a powerful thrust into Germany. No reallocation of our present resources would be adequate to sustain a thrust to Berlin.
4. Accordingly, my intention is to occupy the Saar and the Ruhr, and by the time we have done this, Havre and Antwerp should be available to maintain one or both of the thrusts you mention...

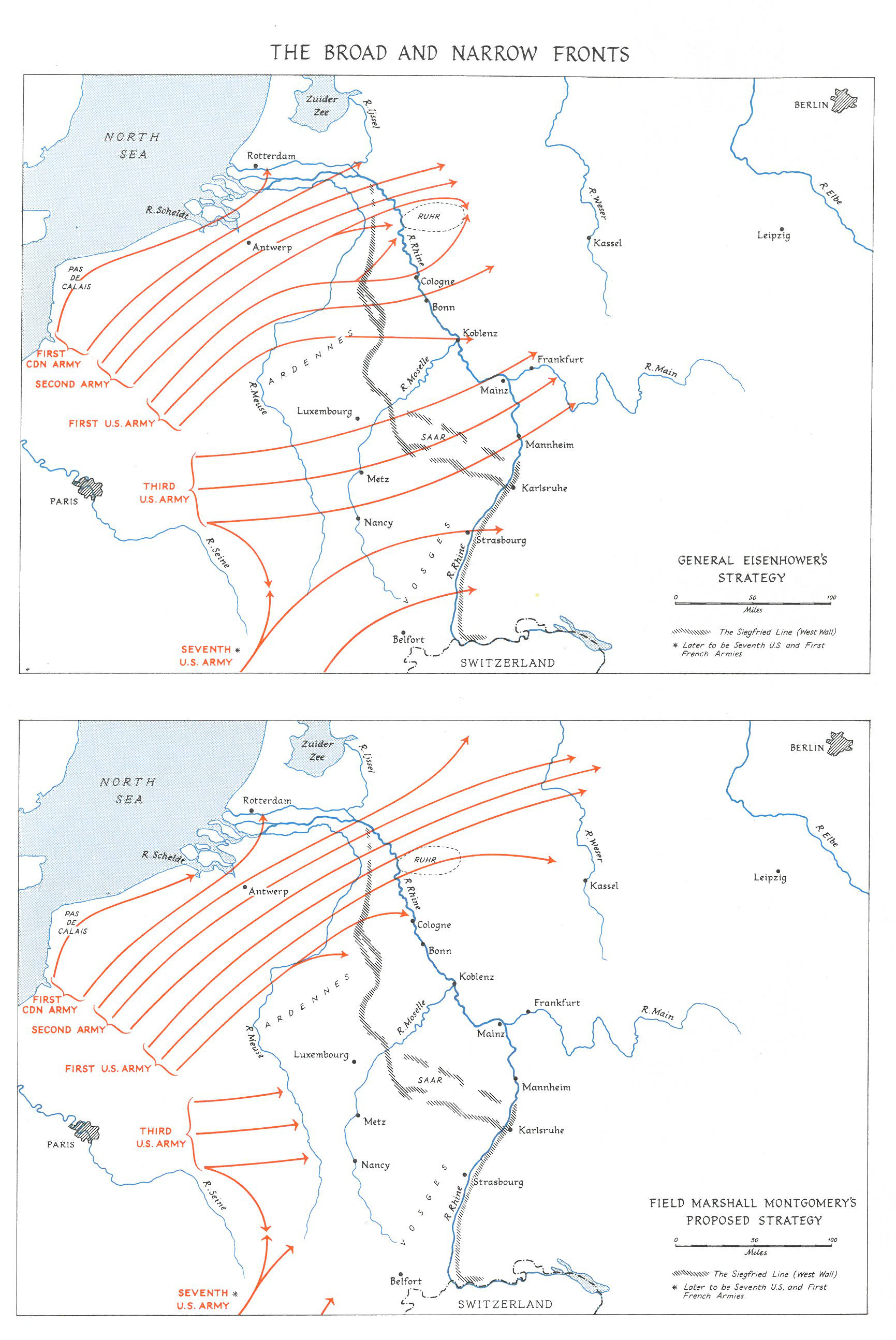
Broad and narrow fronts

Montgomery's next meeting with Eisenhower was in the latter's North American B-25 Mitchell at an airfield outside Brussels on 10 September. Montgomery described Eisenhower's telegrams as "nothing but balls, sheer balls, rubbish." Eisenhower put his hand on Montgomery's knee and replied: "Steady, Monty, you can't speak to me like that, I'm your boss." This elicited a rare apology from Montgomery.

Also present at the meeting were the Deputy Supreme Commander, Air Chief Marshal Sir Arthur Tedder; the Chief Administrative Officer at SHAEF, Lieutenant-General Sir Humfrey Gale; and Montgomery's Chief Administrative Officer, Major-General Miles Graham. Graham was confident that he could support the 21st Army Group through the French Channel Ports, and did not require Antwerp to be opened, but this was a statement of the British logistical situation. Compared with the Americans, the British forces were smaller, their line of communications was shorter, the road networks in Belgium were better than those in Lorraine, and the rail network in the British sector was comparatively intact. Perhaps most important of all, Montgomery's advance up to then had taken him closer to the Channel ports and shortened his supply lines, while Bradley's advance had moved away from the coast and had lengthened his supply lines.

Eisenhower stated his belief that advance on a broad front would soon provoke German forces to collapse. He told Montgomery why a "single thrust" toward Berlin was not going to be accepted.

What you're proposing is this—if I give you all the supplies you want, you could go straight to Berlin—right straight (500 miles) to Berlin? Monty, you're nuts. You can't do it. What the hell[?] ... If you try a long column like that in a single thrust you'd have to throw off division after division to protect your flanks from attack.

Eisenhower rejected what he considered a "pencil-like" thrust into Germany. American official historian Forrest Pogue considered Montgomery's description of the proposed advance as "full-blooded" to be a more apt description given that it involved two armies; Pogue felt that the description of "pencil-like" was more applicable to Patton's proposal, which called for just two corps, and which Eisenhower likewise rejected in favour of a broad front advance. Carlo D'Este noted that this was "a powerful example of the fundamental disparity between British and American military doctrine."

In mid-September Eisenhower had two possible courses of action: concentrating all available resources on a narrow front directed toward the centre of Germany, or an advance along a broad front to capture suitable positions on the German frontier where the Allied forces could regroup ahead of a future broad drive into Germany. The Allied leaders were aware that the logistic resources were inadequate for either option, but Eisenhower decided on the second plan. On 10 September Eisenhower authorised two US Armies to advance to both the Ruhr and the Saar, in the belief that the gamble was worth taking in order to fully exploit the disorganised state of the German forces. The objective was to advance to the Rhine, secure bridge-heads over the Rhine, seize the Ruhr industrial heartland, and then build up force in preparation for a final drive across Germany. The dual offensive was supportable only if it could achieve quick success. The limited logistic capabilities required a succession of attacks by the various armies, with supply priorities shifting to each in turn.

Eisenhower's directives in mid-September were based on a determination to maintain offensive pressure, but this would have to be done within severely restricted logistic capabilities. The idea of aiming a powerful thrust deep into Germany was definitely abandoned, because any sustained drives would first require a major re-orientation toward shorter lines of communication based on the northern ports.

The obvious solution lay in the development of the Seine ports and Antwerp. Eisenhower specified that additional ports must be secured simultaneously with the attacks eastward. The British 21st Army Group was tasked to secure the approaches to Antwerp or Rotterdam, and capture additional Channel ports. The US 12th Army Group was tasked to complete the capture of Brest as quickly as possible, and to link up with the Allied forces which had captured the French Mediterranean ports in Operation Dragoon.

In a message to Montgomery on 15 September, Eisenhower stated that once the Ruhr and the Saar had been secured, his intention was then to advance on Berlin.

== Trigg's claims about German commanders' views ==
Jonathan Trigg has stated that several German commanders including Gerd von Rundstedt, believed a narrow front thrust by Montgomery would have led to a late 1944 end to the war. Trigg has stated that Kurt Meyer said in September 1944: "The Ruhr lay undefended in front of the Allied spearheads and nothing could prevent Montgomery from occupying Germany's weapons forge. One powerful drive by ten to fifteen Allied divisions into the northwest would break the backbone of German resistance and end the war in weeks." According to Trigg, Günther Blumentritt stated that "had Montgomery's Anglo-Canadian 21st Army Group been unleashed earlier for a concentrated armoured assault (as Montgomery had wished) rather than fighting on a broad front, "Such a breakthrough ... would have torn the weak German front to pieces and ended the war in the winter of 1944." Rundstedt also stated in agreement "the best course of the Allies would have been to concentrate a really strong striking force with which to break through past Aachen to the Ruhr area. Strategically and politically, Berlin was the target. Germany's strength is in the north. He who holds northern Germany holds Germany. Such a break-through, coupled with air domination, would have torn in pieces the weak German front and ended the war."

Trigg stated that Johannes Blaskowitz said: "A direct attack on Metz was unnecessary. .... In contrast a swerve northward in the direction of Luxembourg and Bitburg would have met with greater success and caused our 1.Armee's right flank to collapse followed by the breakdown of our 7.Armee." Trigg stated that Heinrich Eberbach agreed, saying: "the whole point of their main effort is wrong. The traditional gateway is through the Saar".

== Outcome ==
On 17 September, Eisenhower emphasized that an additional major deep-water port on the north flank was an indispensable prerequisite for the final drive into Germany, and that a large-scale drive into the "enemy's heart" was unthinkable without the opening of Antwerp. He resolved to thereafter advance on a broad front once adequate logistic support was available.

Eisenhower gave Montgomery permission to proceed with Operation Market Garden, in which airborne troops would seize a series of bridges up to the Rhine at Arnhem, which Eisenhower saw as having the limited objective of securing a bridgehead over the Rhine. Operation Market Garden was fought from 17 to 25 September 1944, and ended with a British defeat at the Battle of Arnhem when the ground forces were held up by German defenders on the narrow road, and could not reach the airborne troops in time.

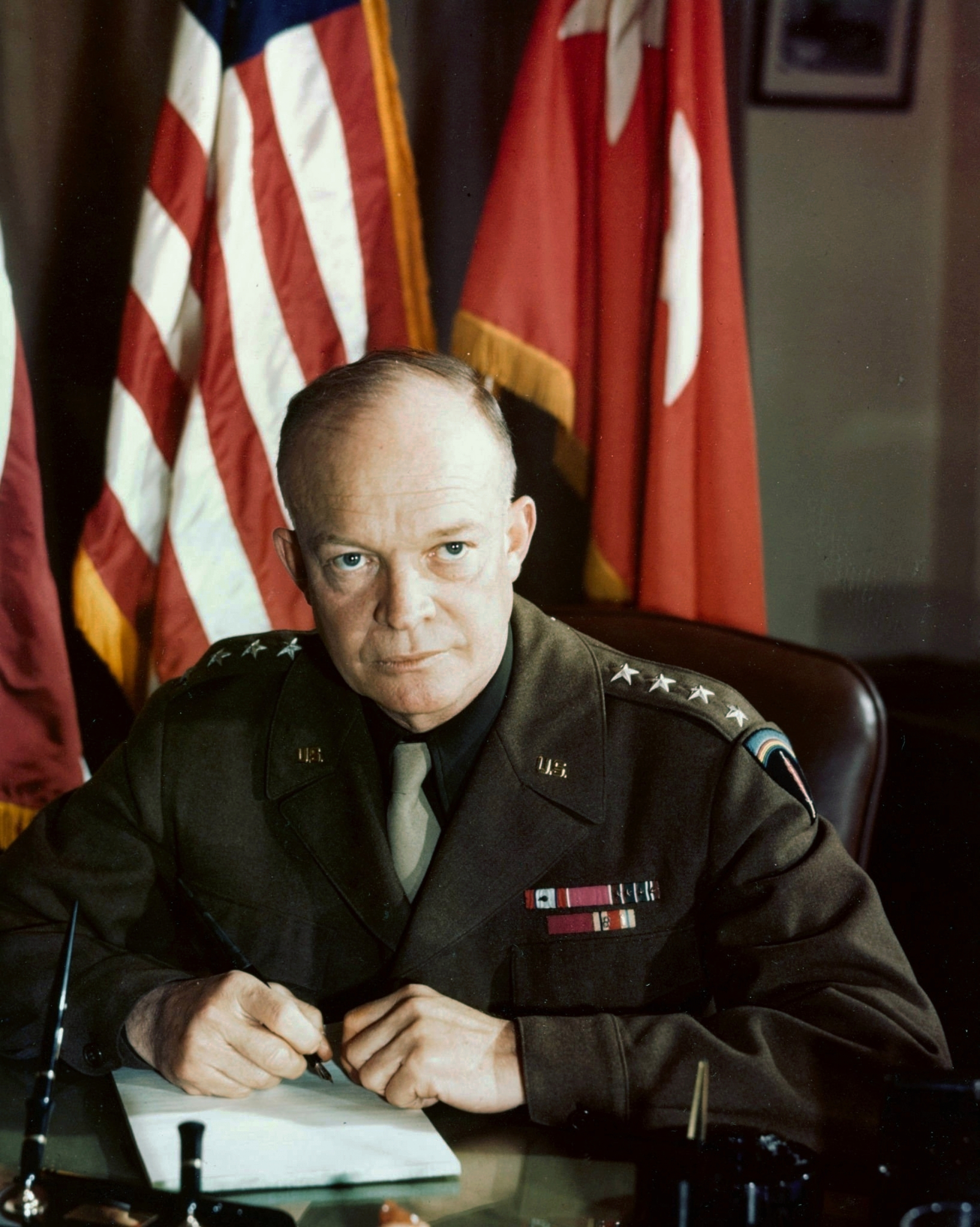
General Dwight D. Eisenhower

On 18 and 21 September, with the Battle of Arnhem was still raging, Montgomery tried one last time to get his narrow front strategy adopted in cables to Smith. Once again, Eisenhower rejected the narrow front concept. "So far as the debate between proponents of the single thrust to the north or south of the Ardennes was concerned," Pogue wrote, "the result at Arnhem settled nothing." For his part, Bradley still insisted on advances in both the north and the south, but by 21 September he had accepted that opening the port of Antwerp was necessary to support future operations. As the planners had feared, the available resources were insufficient to support the broad front strategy.

Eisenhower held a conference at Versailles the following day that was attended by 23 generals and admirals, including most of his senior commanders. The only notable absence was Montgomery, who sent his chief of staff, Major-General Francis de Guingand in his stead owing to the critical situation at Arnhem. Eisenhower attempted to make his intentions clear. He declared that operations in the immediate future would be limited to breaching the Siegfried Line and advancing on the Ruhr. He ordered Bradley to convey the decisions reached at the conference to Montgomery in person.

The subsequent defeat at Arnhem made it clear that the war would not end soon, and that much hard fighting lay ahead. Bradley was drawn into costly battles at Aachen, the Hürtgen Forest and Metz. In making his decision in favour of a broad front advance, Eisenhower took both political and strategic factors into account, as well as tactical and logistical factors. He considered the political consequence in an American election year, and damage that might be done to inter-Allied cooperation if one nation was seen as being favoured over the other. He was aware of the glittering prospect of an early victory that Montgomery offered, but rightly judged it beyond reach.

Operations to clear the Scheldt were initiated by the First Canadian Army in October, but it became apparent that it did not have sufficient resources to complete the operations alone. On 15 October, Eisenhower sent Montgomery a direct order to focus all his resources on the opening of Antwerp, which Eisenhower frankly explained was absolutely necessary for the support of the American forces. The following day Montgomery issued a new directive to the 21st Army Group prioritising the opening of Antwerp over the advance to the Rhine, and committing the British Second Army as well as the Canadian First Army to the battle. The battle ended on 8 November, and minesweeping operations concluded on 26 November. Two days later, the first Liberty ship entered the port.

== Post-war controversy ==
"Of all decisions made at the level of the Supreme Allied Commander in western Europe during World War II," American official historian Roland Ruppenthal wrote, "perhaps none has excited more polemics than that which raised the 'one-thrust-broad front' controversy." In sorting out who said what and when, historians were handicapped by SHAEF's failure to keep stenographic records of what was said in conferences. This forced them to rely on diaries, memoirs and oral recollections, but many of these were incomplete because the Ultra secret – whereby German encrypted messages were being read by the Allies – was not divulged until 1974. Eisenhower met frequently with Bradley, and often stayed overnight at 12th Army Group headquarters where he had many conversations that went unrecorded. He saw Montgomery much less frequently, but when they did so it was also often in private, with no staff officers present.

In his English History 1914–1945 (1965), the British historian A. J. P. Taylor credited Chester Wilmot's The Struggle For Europe (1952) as the work that "launched the myths that Eisenhower prevented Montgomery from winning the war in 1944". Fellow British historian John Keegan noted that Taylor was unusual among British historians in dismissing the argument out of hand. Wilmot was not the first to advance this argument in print; Ralph Ingersoll had argued it in his Top Secret (1946). In response, Smith wrote a series of articles in The Saturday Evening Post in June and July that later formed the basis of his Eisenhower's Six Great Decisions (1956).

Keegan credited Wilmot with having "invented the contemporary writing of military history by mixing social, economic and political factors with both strategy and tactics." Wilmot was able to interview Montgomery three times. This was unusual; Montgomery had declined to be interviewed by Pogue, Correlli Barnett or Sir Arthur Bryant's researcher, M. C. "Buster" Long. Montgomery also gave Wilmot access to his letters and correspondence with Eisenhower in September and October 1944. Writing in 1950, Wilmot reflected the frustration of the early Cold War with the outcome of the Second World War that saw the Soviet Union's dominance of eastern Europe and the Balkans, which Wilmot argued could have been avoided. It seemed that instead of making the world safe for democracy, the war had made it safe for communism.

Wilmot's case was bolstered by German general Guenther Blumentritt, the wartime chief of staff of Field Marshal Gerd von Rundstedt, Eisenhower's German opponent, in his biography of Rundstedt, Von Rundstedt: The Soldier and the Man (1952). Blumentritt wrote that Rundstedt had considered the northern thrust to be the obvious move. This was seen as an endorsement of Montgomery's strategy, and prompted headlines like "Did Ike Blunder and Prolong the War?"

American official historian Maurice Matloff described this as a post-war myth, something that had never been seriously considered during the war. The Allied occupation zones in Germany had been agreed upon in February 1944, and a faster Allied advance in the autumn of 1944 would not have altered this. The Soviet Union would have also benefited from a rapid German collapse, and its participation in the war against Japan was greatly desired. The consequences if the narrow front advance had failed, should also be considered. In such a scenario, the Soviet Union could have dominated even more of Europe.

The continuation of the war beyond September 1944 had little to do with the war aims of the Soviet Union and much to do with the determination of Adolf Hitler and his supporters to fight on to the bitter end. While surrender would have been a sensible option in 1944, it was not one that they entertained. Matloff noted that Wilmot's portrait of the British as having a coherent political and military strategy honed over the centuries was not supported by evidence. "Wilmot's book", he wrote, "must be taken for what it represents—a suggestive, provocative work on the war written from a British point of view in a period of disenchantment."

While wartime arguments were often as much about personalities and politics, post-war debates were about strategy and logistics, which gave them a more elevated tone. In his memoir, Operation Victory, which was published in January 1947 and serialised in The Times, de Guingand provided an account of the wartime debate, in which he stated that he had opposed Montgomery's narrow front strategy on political and administrative grounds. Montgomery could not recall de Guingand ever dissenting with him about his strategy, and Graham wrote a letter to The Times, which was published on 24 February, defending his wartime contention that the narrow front advance was logistically feasible. In 1977, historian Martin van Creveld calculated that an advance as far as Dortmund was practical, although he had reservations about whether the Allied logistical system possessed the required flexibility to provide a truly viable alternative to Eisenhower's broad front strategy.

British military historian C. J. Dick wrote in 2016 that:

All things being equal, Montgomery's operational idea was the best. But all things were not equal. Another, more important limiting factor was politics. Eisenhower was acutely aware that, especially in a presidential election year, the prejudices, preconceptions and attitudes of the American public and political class, not to mention the Army itself, were critical to his continuing command. British views and desires were not without significance, but their confluence was waning as American preponderance and self-confidence grew.

Former British Army officer Jonathan Trigg stated that the Broad Front strategy ignored the Clausewitzian maxim on concentration of force as "he who attacks everything attacks nothing".

Criticism of Eisenhower's broad front strategy was not confined to British historians. American historians noted that tactical and operational opportunities were passed up in the American sectors around Wallendorf, the Schnee Eifel and in Alsace. The vision of a rapid advance by Patton had the appeal of simplifying and personalising a complex military situation, but the reality of terrain and logistics argued strongly against it, and the capture of the Saar would not have prompted a German collapse. Carlo D'Este noted that "it is hard to ignore the suggestion that Eisenhower's broad front strategy had as much to do with politics as it did with logistical considerations and military philosophy." American official historian Martin Blumenson remarked that Eisenhower "could not let either a British or American general win the war single-handedly; they had to do it together."

In 1970, American historian Stephen Ambrose concluded that:

No matter how brilliant or logical Montgomery's plan for an advance to the Ruhr was (and a good case can be made that it was both), and no matter what Montgomery's personality was, under no circumstances would Eisenhower agree to give all the glory to the British, any more than he would agree to give it to American forces. But as things stood Eisenhower could not make his decisions solely on military grounds. He could not halt Patton in his tracks, relegate Bradley to a minor administrative role, and in effect tell Marshall that the great army he had raised in the United States was not needed in Europe.
