= Betty Askwith =

- Born: Betty Ellen Askwith; 26 June 1909; Chelsea, London, England
- Died: 10 April 1995 (aged 85)
- Occupations: Writer and biographer
- Parents: George Askwith, 1st Baron Askwith (father); Ellen Peel (mother)

Betty Ellen Askwith (26 June 1909 – 10 April 1995) was an English writer and biographer.

== Personal life ==
Betty Ellen Askwith was born on 26 June 1909 in Chelsea, London, the only daughter of the first Lord Askwith and Ellen Graham (née Peel). George Askwith had been Chief Industrial Commissioner before the First World War, and her mother was a descendant of Sir Robert Peel. Both Askwith's parents were published writers, and she showed a passion for writing from a young age. Her first book of poems was published in 1928, when Askwith was 19, and a second followed in 1931. Although Askwith attended the Lycée Francais, she never went to university.

Askwith married Keith Miller Jones, a solicitor, in 1950, and the couple lived in Egerton Terrace, London. Jones died in 1978.

== Career ==
During a career spanning fifty years, Askwith published poems, novels, and biographies. In the 1930s, with her friend Theodora Benson, Askwith wrote three humorous books: Foreigners, or the World in a Nutshell; Muddling Through, or Britain in a Nutshell; and How to Succeed, or The Great in Nutshells. Ruari McLean described the first of these as being "two of the funniest books published in England before the Second World War". Theodora Benson dedicated her first novel, Salad Days, to Askwith.

During the Second World War, Askwith worked at the Ministry of Information.

Askwith's most lauded work was A Tangled Web (1960). Her last novel, A Step out of Time, was published in 1966. In 1969, she published a biography of Lady Dilke. Two Victorian Families (1971) explored the lives of the Benson and Strachey families. Gillian Wagner described her treatment of them as "admirable":

One can respect Edward White Benson, Headmaster of Wellington, Bishop of Truro, Archbishop of Canterbury, but one cannot like him. His treatment of his wife and family was dreadful - his three sons, A.C., R.H. and E.F., grew up emotionally crippled. Yet Askwith did him absolute justice.

Two further biographical works followed: The Lytteltons: a family chronicle of the 19th century (1975), and Piety and Wit: the biography of Harriet, Countess Granville 1785-1862 (1982).

== Death and legacy ==
Betty Askwith died on 10 April 1995. Her obituary in The Times stated that "Although she never attained real literary celebrity, her life was full of interest, warm friendship and solid achievement.
