= George Askwith, 1st Baron Askwith =

English lawyer and civil servant

The Right Honourable The Lord Askwith KBE, KC
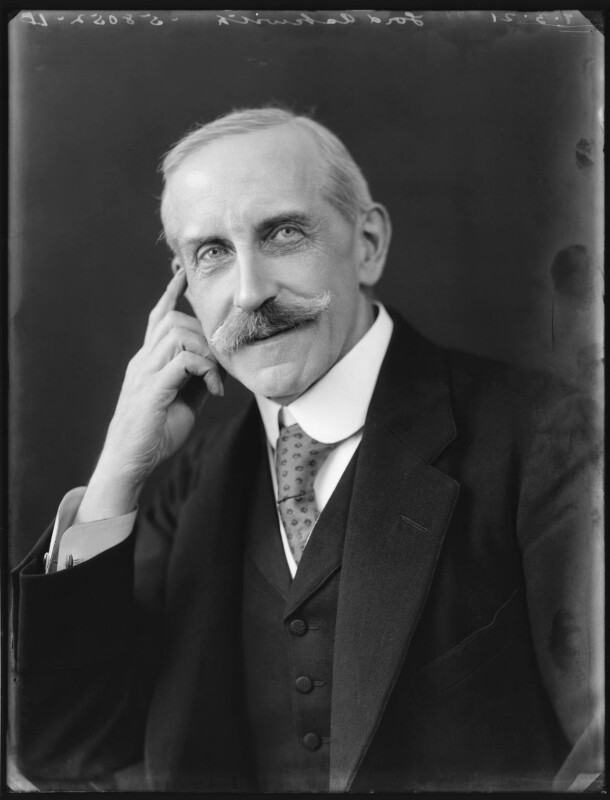
- Askwith in 1921

Personal details
- Born: 17 February 1861 Waltham Abbey, Essex, England
- Died: 2 June 1942 (aged 81) Chelsea, London
- Spouse: Ellen Peel (d. 1962)
- Children: Betty Askwith
- Education: Brasenose College, Oxford

George Ranken Askwith, 1st Baron Askwith, KCB, KC (17 February 1861 – 2 June 1942), known as Sir George Askwith between 1911 and 1919, was an English lawyer, civil servant, and industrial arbitrator.

== Early life ==
Askwith was from an old Yorkshire family, the great-grandson of William Askwith, Mayor of Ripon. He was the son of Gen. William Harrison Askwith and his wife, Elizabeth Ranken, daughter of London merchant George Ranken. He was educated at Marlborough College and matriculated at Brasenose College, Oxford in 1880, graduating B.A. in 1884 and M.A. in 1887. He was called to the Bar, Middle Temple, in 1886.

At the start of his legal career, Askwith was in the legal chambers of Sir Henry James. He was appointed a King's Counsel in 1908.

== Public life ==
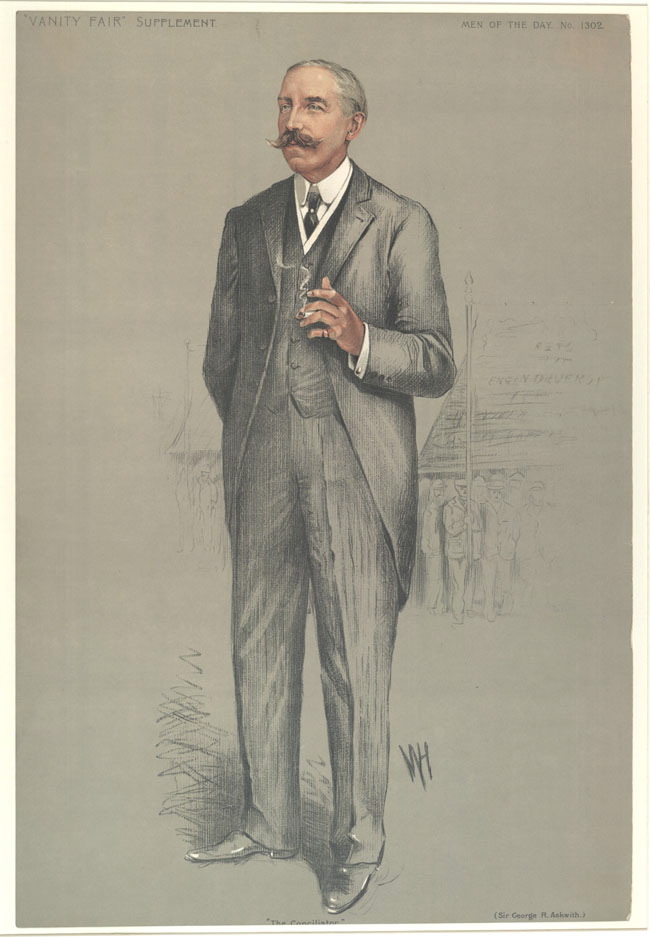
Caricature entitled "The Conciliator" by Wallace Hester from Vanity Fair, 25 October 1911

In 1899 Askwith was one of the counsel in the Venezuelan arbitration case. In 1907 he entered the railways section of the Board of Trade as assistant secretary, and in 1909 was appointed comptroller-general of the Commercial, Labour and Statistical Departments of the Board of Trade. He acted as arbitrator in many industrial disputes, and in 1911 was made a Knight Commander of the Order of the Bath (KCB) in recognition of his valuable work in that capacity, having already been made a CB in 1909.

Askwith in 1911 became chairman of the recently constituted Industrial Council. It brought together industrialists and trade union representatives, in an unsuccessful attempt to create a central hub for conciliation and arbitration of disputes. In 1912 he made a special report for the Government on the Canadian labour laws, and in 1913 arbitrated in the major Black Country trades strike which lasted for two months and involved in the region of 40,000 workers. In 1915 he was appointed chairman of the Government Arbitration Committee under the Munitions of War Act, holding this post until 1917. On the Committee of Production he did important work for the Government. In 1919 he retired from his position as chief industrial commissioner, and was raised to the peerage as Baron Askwith, of St Ives in the County of Huntingdon.

Lord Askwith was later Chairman of the Council of the Royal Society of Arts between 1922 and 1924, Treasurer of the Royal Society of Arts between 1925 and 1927 and its Vice-President between 1927 and 1938. He was also President of the Institute of Patentees and Inventors between 1925 and 1942. He published Industrial Problems and Disputes (1920), British Taverns, their History and Laws (1928) and Lord James of Hereford (1930).

In 1931-32, he chaired a Royal Commission investigating the political situation in Malta.

== Personal life ==
In 1908, Lord Askwith married Ellen Peel, daughter of Archibald Peel, nephew of the statesman Sir Robert Peel. She was the widow of Major Henry Graham (d. 1907) and mother of Miles Graham. They had one daughter, Betty Ellen Peel FRSL. During the First World War, Lady Askwith was a member of the Central Committee on Women's Employment, and was created a Commander of the Order of the British Empire (CBE) in 1918.

Lord Askwith died June 1942, aged 81, when the barony became extinct. Lady Askwith died in January 1962.

== Arms ==
Coat of arms of George Askwith, 1st Baron Askwith

Crest
A Cross Crosslet fitchée between two Wings erect Sable each charged with a Rose as in the Arms
Escutcheon
Sable a Fess between in chief two Cross Crosslets and in base a Rose argent
Supporters
On either side a Dove holding in the beak an Olive Branch all proper
Motto
Honesta quam splendida ("Honour things inasmuch as they are brilliant")

Peerage of the United Kingdom
New creation	Baron Askwith; 1919–1942	Extinct
