= Theodora Benson =

English writer

The Hon Theodora Benson
- Benson in 1931
- Born: Eleanor Theodora Roby Benson; 21 August 1906; Lichfield, England
- Died: 25 December 1968 (aged 62)
- Education: SOAS University of London
- Father: Godfrey Benson

Eleanor Theodora Roby Benson (21 August 1906 – 25 December 1968) was an English writer.

== Early life ==
Benson was born in Lichfield, Staffordshire, the daughter of Godfrey Benson, 1st Baron Charnwood. She went to school at Queen's College and Cheltenham Ladies' College. She studied Malay at the School of Oriental Studies in Bloomsbury, London.

== Career ==
Benson published her first novel, Salad Days, in 1928. She dedicated it to Betty Askwith, her friend and future collaborator. Country Life wrote that it "marked her out as a writer whose humour and freshness were as delightful as her outlook was sane and modern".

Benson's early novels in particular were highly praised. She also wrote short fiction (including thrillers and tales of the macabre), travel books, and an edited collection. She also contributed to publications such as "Woman to Woman", Country Life, and Lilliput. Benson admired Evelyn Waugh, who contributed to Benson's The First Time I… among the likes of Rose Macauley, Louis Golding, and Antonia White.

With Betty Askwith, Benson wrote three humorous books: Foreigners, or the World in a Nutshell; Muddling Through, or Britain in a Nutshell; and How to Succeed, or The Great in Nutshells. While the pair were in their twenties, they also collaborated on the novels Lobster Quadrille and Seven Basketfuls.

During World War II, Benson worked as a ghost speechwriter in the Ministry of Information.

The collection Best Stories of Theodora Benson was published in 1940. The Spectator wrote:

Miss Theodora Benson presents us with her best short stories, wherein she skips amusingly enough over the face of the globe east and west, and at her ease everywhere. The tales are slick with slickly, amusing dialogue and heroines of magazine-cover looks. But gentleness can be glimpsed sometimes under the Vogue allure.

After the war, Benson grew more serious. One friend explained that her "compassions and insight, in her later years, seemed to intensify to a burning point and caused her to be endlessly occupied and concerned with other people". She would go on to author two more novels, The Undertaker's Wife and Rehearsal for Death, as well as a second short story collection The Man from the Tunnel, and Other Stories.

== Death and legacy ==
Benson never married. Towards the end of her life, she began writing about the 18th-century crime of Catherine Nairn but never finished. She died of pneumonia at age 62 while staying with her sister Antonia, Lady Radcliffe in the countryside. The Times published an obituary for Benson, which was followed by additional contributions from Elizabeth Jenkins and Betty Askwith. Askwith wrote in praise of Benson's writing:

Theodora pursued her serious work, and not only wrote perceptive and readable novels but also experimented with new techniques.

In 1971, in the preface to The Case of Kitty Ogilvie, Jean Stubbs acknowledged Benson as having conducted "the meticulous researches" on which the novel was based.

Successful at time of publication, Benson's works remained out of print for decades. In 2018, a Tumblr and Weebly-based blog began collecting information on Benson. Her fourth novel Which Way? was republished in 2022 as part of a British Library series on "lost" 20th-century novels by women writers.

== Bibliography ==
=== Novels ===
- Salad Days (1928)
- Glass Houses (1929)
- Shallow Water (1931)
- Which Way? (1931 or 2)
- Façade (1933)
- Concert Pitch (1934)
- The Undertaker's Wife (1947 or 8)
- Rehearsal for Death (1954)

=== Non-fiction ===
- Chip, Chip, My Little Horse (1934)
- The Unambitious Journey (1935)
- In the East my Pleasure Lies (1938)
- Sweethearts and Wives, Their Part in War (1943)
- London Immortals (1951)

=== Short story collections ===
- Best Stories of Theodora Benson (1940)
- The Man from the Tunnel, and Other Stories (1950)

=== Edited volumes ===
- The First Time I... (1935)

=== Collaborations with Betty Askwith ===
- Lobster Quadrille (1930)
- Seven Basketfuls (1932)
- Muddling Through; or, Britain in a Nutshell (1934)
- Foreigners; or, The World in a Nutshell (1935)
- How to be Famous; or, the Great in a Nutshell (1936)
