= Freddie de Guingand =

British Army general (1900–1979)

Major-General Sir Francis de Guingand KBE CB DSO
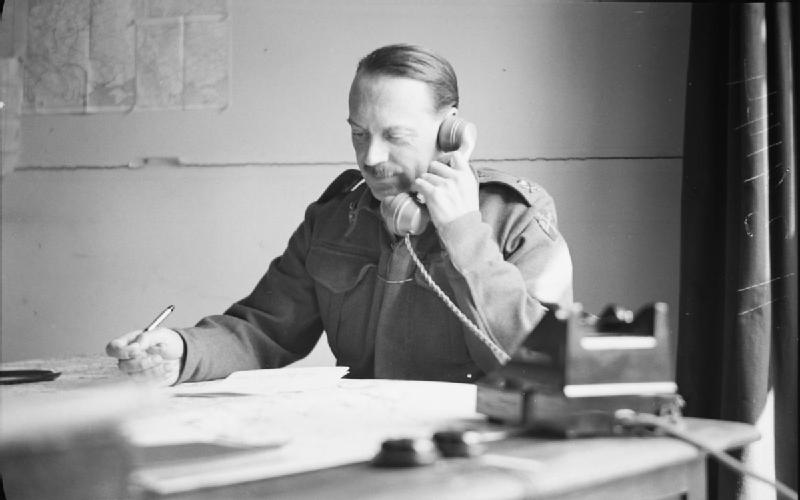
- Born: 28 February 1900; Acton, London, England
- Died: 29 June 1979 (aged 79); Cannes, France
- Military career
- Allegiance: United Kingdom
- Branch: British Army
- Service years: 1919–1946
- Rank: Major-General
- Nickname: Freddie
- Service number: 20274
- Unit: West Yorkshire Regiment
- Conflicts: Second World War; Battle of Greece; Western Desert campaign; Tunisian campaign; Sicilian campaign; Italian campaign; Normandy campaign; Western Allied invasion of Germany
- Awards: Knight Commander of the Order of the British Empire; Companion of the Order of the Bath; Distinguished Service Order; Mention in Despatches (3); Legion of Merit (US); Knight Grand Officer of the Order of Orange Nassau with Swords (Netherlands); Distinguished Service Medal (US)

Major-General Sir Francis Wilfred "Freddie" de Guingand, KBE, CB, DSO (28 February 1900 – 29 June 1979) was a British Army officer who served as Field Marshal Sir Bernard Montgomery's chief of staff from the Second Battle of El Alamein until the end of the Second World War. He played an important diplomatic role in sustaining relations between the notoriously difficult Montgomery and his peers and superiors.

A graduate of the Royal Military College, Sandhurst, de Guingand joined the West Yorkshire Regiment (Prince of Wales's Own) in December 1919. He served in India and Ireland, and was seconded to the King's African Rifles in Nyasaland from 1926 to 1931. Through the intervention of Montgomery, with whom he had formed a friendship during their service together the 1920s and 1930s, he secured a nomination to 1935–36 course at the Staff College, Camberley. He served as Military Assistant to the Secretary of State for War, Leslie Hore-Belisha, from 1939 to 1940, in which role he had exposure to the most senior officers in the army and developed skills in diplomacy.

After Hore-Belisha resigned, de Guingand was posted to the new staff college at Haifa in Mandatory Palestine as an instructor. In December 1940, on the recommendation of the Staff College's Commandant Eric Dorman-Smith, he was posted to the Joint Planning Staff of Middle East Command in Cairo where he also took on the role of secretary to the Commanders-in-Chief Committee. In February 1942 Dorman-Smith, now Deputy Chief of the General Staff at Middle East Command, recommended him for the position of Director of Military Intelligence, Middle East. In this role he was successful, and after the First Battle of El Alamein he was appointed the Eighth Army's Brigadier General Staff. When Montgomery assumed command of Eighth Army in August 1942 he became Montgomery's chief of staff. His diplomatic skills proved advantageous when serving with Montgomery. He proved indispensable not only in battle, but also in relations with the Americans – he was "liked and trusted by all". He formed a close relationship with Walter Bedell Smith, the chief of staff to Supreme Allied Commander, General of the Army Dwight Eisenhower, and was able to smooth over many difficulties arising from Montgomery's personality and his problematic relationships with many of his peers and superiors.

De Guingand was on sick leave on several occasions, and only Montgomery's intervention kept the doctors from relieving him. After the end of hostilities in Europe he spent time recuperating but was still not recovered when he was appointed as Director of Military Intelligence (DMI) in September 1945. Montgomery had become aware that he was to succeed Alan Brooke as Chief of the Imperial General Staff in June 1946 and told de Guingand he wanted him as his Vice Chief of the Imperial General Staff. However, de Guingand failed to impress Brooke as DMI and as a result the job went to Frank Simpson. De Guingand retired from the army In February 1947 and emigrated to Southern Rhodesia to pursue a career in business, achieving considerable success. He wrote four books about his experiences: Operation Victory (1947), African Assignment (1953), Generals at War (1954), and From Brass Hat to Bowler Hat (1979).

== Early life ==
Francis Wilfred de Guingand was born in Acton, London, on 28 February 1900, the second of the four children of Francis Julius de Guingand, a briar-wood tobacco pipe manufacturer, and his wife Mary Monica née Priestman. He had an older sister, Marine Pauline, and two younger brothers. The family lived comfortably near Gunnersbury Park in London. He was educated at St Benedict's School, Ealing, starting in 1909, and then from 1915 at Ampleforth College. Encouraged by his father, who was elected Vice-Commodore of the Royal Corinthian Yacht Club in 1921, he acquired a passion for sailing. The family owned a yacht that was normally kept at Burnham-on-Crouch, and sailed it to France and Spain on summer vacations. De Guingand intended to join the Royal Navy, but was rejected for being colour blind, and joined the British Army instead.

De Guingand entered the Royal Military College, Sandhurst on 10 September 1918, ranked fifteenth in his class on entry. While there he acquired the nickname "Freddie", after Freddie the Frog, a popular cartoon character, an allusion to his French surname. On graduation he chose to join the West Yorkshire Regiment (Prince of Wales's Own), which had sponsored the Officers' Training Corps unit at Ampleforth. He was commissioned as a second lieutenant in the regiment on 17 December 1919. He was immediately sent to join its 2nd Battalion in British India, where he was promoted to lieutenant on 17 December 1921.

== Between the wars ==
A serious case of gallstones led to de Guingand being invalided back to the UK in 1922, but he recovered, and rejoined his regiment at Cork in Ireland. Later that year he became the officer in charge of the regimental training cadre at Fulford Barracks in Fulford, North Yorkshire, where he became friends with Bernard Montgomery, who was a staff officer with the 49th (West Riding) Infantry Division at the time. The two played golf and contract bridge together. Montgomery encouraged de Guingand to apply for staff college, but he was still too young to sit the entrance examination.

In 1926 de Guingand volunteered for service on secondment with the King's African Rifles. Overseas postings to colonial units were a popular option for young subalterns at the time, as they offered higher pay, greater responsibility, and occasional excitement. He served in Nyasaland as adjutant of the 1st Battalion, Kings African Rifles, and then on the staff of the Officer Commanding Troops, Nyasaland. During this time he was promoted to the temporary rank of captain on 10 June 1929, and to the permanent rank on 8 March 1930.

De Guingand returned to his regiment in the UK in October 1931. He was appointed regimental adjutant with the 1st Battalion in Egypt in July 1932. He renewed his friendship with Montgomery, who commanded the 1st Battalion, Royal Warwickshire Regiment, another battalion in the Canal Brigade. In 1934, the battalion moved on to Quetta in the Baluchistan Province of British India near the border with Afghanistan, where Montgomery was teaching as an instructor at the staff college there. De Guingand passed the entrance exams to attend the Staff College, Camberley but required a nomination from a senior officer. Entry was highly competitive; about 600 officers sat the examination each year for around 60 places. Those who scored highest were guaranteed places, but the remaining positions were filled from others who had passed the exam and were then given a place based on their service record. Montgomery arranged for a nomination from the Chief of the General Staff (India). He also wrote to several of the instructors at Camberley recommending him.

After passing the staff college course in 1936, De Guingand returned to the 2nd Battalion of his regiment as a company commander but a staff assignment normally followed completion of the course. His next assignment was brigade major of the Small Arms School at Netheravon in 1937. This gave him a chance to visit the corresponding schools of the French and German armies. He was not impressed by the dilapidated French one at Camp de Châlons, but at the Döberitz Infantry School he found a lavishly equipped facility, with weapons and training methods he considered superior to those of the British Army. He was promoted major on 1 August 1938.

== Second World War ==
On 15 July 1939, De Guingand became the military assistant to the Secretary of State for War, Leslie Hore-Belisha, with the grade of GSO2. Hore-Belisha had civil service aides to assist him in his duties, but required an Army officer to advise him on military matters, to provide an Army point of view, and to assist in writing his speeches. As such, de Guingand accompanied Hore-Belisha on visits to military bases and establishments. Hore-Belisha was popular with the press and the people, but not so much with his Cabinet colleagues. Wide-ranging reforms that included the dismissal of many senior Army officers soon made him unpopular in the Army.

De Guingand gradually warmed to Hore-Belisha and assumed the role of a confidant. In this role he had exposure to the most senior officers in the Army and developed his skills in diplomacy. Hore-Belisha clashed repeatedly with the Chief of the Imperial General Staff (CIGS), General Lord Gort, whom he had promoted to the position over the heads of sixty more senior officers and after the outbreak of war in September 1939. Hore-Belisha removed Gort by recommending him to command the British Expeditionary Force in France, but the difficulties between the two continued, with arguments over the state of fortifications in France. The friction with Gort led to Hore-Belisha being forced to resign in January 1940.

=== Middle East ===
De Guingand requested to be returned to his regiment, and on 21 January he reported to the West Yorkshire Regiment depot, but was immediately placed on leave. On 25 February he was posted to the new staff college at Haifa in Palestine as an instructor. The war had created an urgent requirement for more trained staff officers, and the new staff college had been created to fill this role. When he arrived the commandant was Lieutenant-Colonel Alexander Galloway but in August Galloway was replaced by Lieutenant-Colonel Eric Dorman-Smith who had been an instructor at Camberley when de Guingand was there as a student. De Guingand soon became chief instructor.

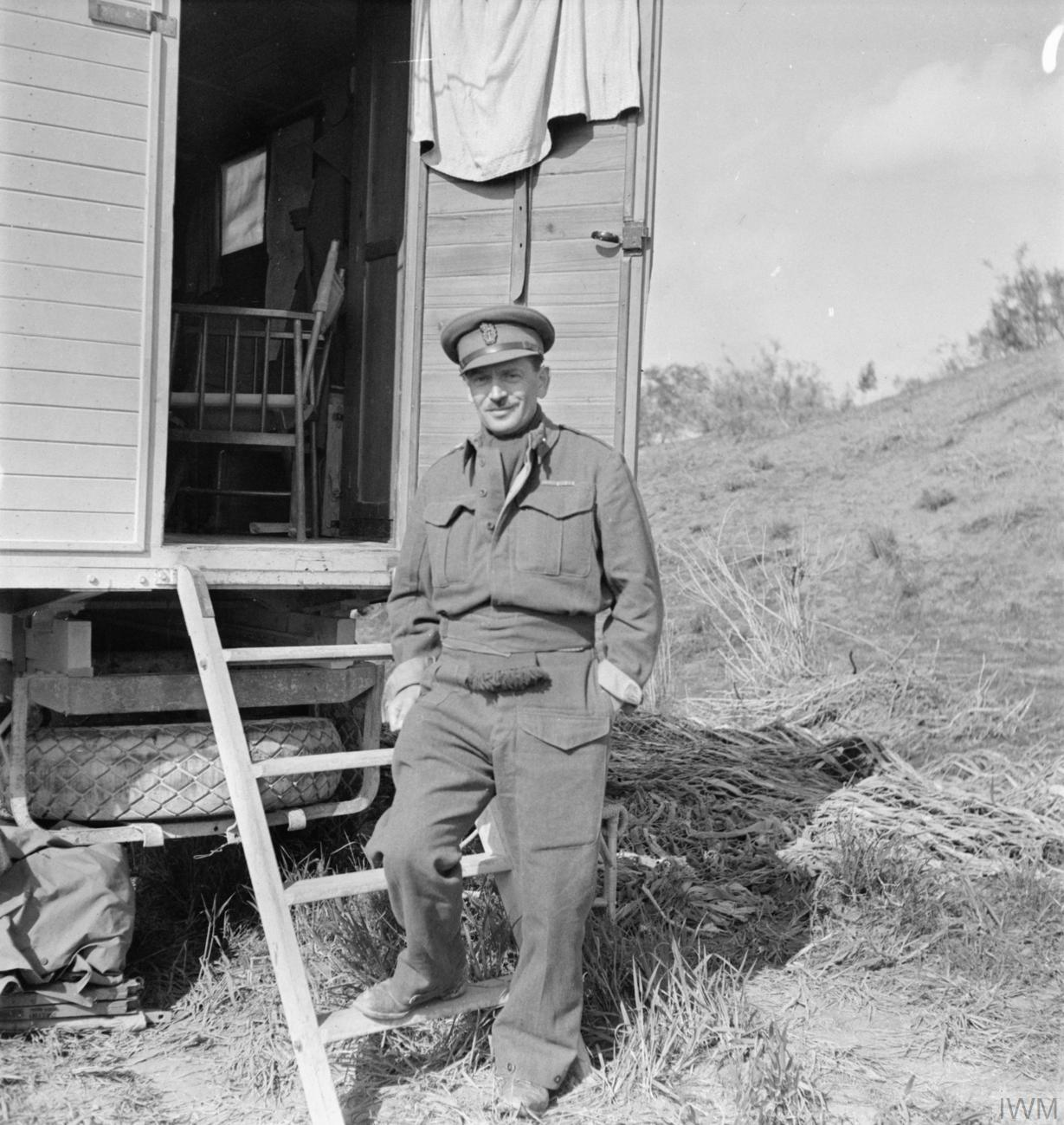
De Guingand outside Montgomery's caravan in Tripoli

After a short period as Commandant of the newly formed School of Combined Operations with the rank of lieutenant-colonel, he was posted in December 1940 to the Joint Planning Staff of General Headquarters (GHQ) Middle East Command in Cairo where he also took on the role of secretary to the Commanders-in-Chief Committee. De Guingand was involved in the planning of Operation Lustre, the despatch of a British and Allied expeditionary force to Greece in March 1941 in response to the failed Italian invasion of Greece and the looming threat of German intervention. He flew over the Aliakmon position where the British forces planned to make a stand, but this did nothing to dispel his doubts about whether the position could be held. He noted the extent of the front that would have to be held, and the ease with which a German turning movement could be executed.

On his own initiative de Guingand commenced joint planning with the Royal Navy and Royal Air Force (RAF) for the evacuation of the expeditionary force from Greece at an early date. The Commander-in-Chief Middle East, General Sir Archibald Wavell, and his chief of the general staff, Major-General Arthur Smith, were initially unaware of this activity. When Smith found out about it, he reported it to Wavell, who ordered de Guingand to cease forthwith, as he feared that it would affect the morale of the expeditionary force in Greece and become self-fulfilling. With the support of the naval and air Commanders-in-Chief de Guingand was allowed to continue with his planning, but Wavell directed that Army component was not to be informed. When the full weight of the German invasion of Greece fell on the Allied positions, it soon became evident that the Aliakmon Line could not be held for long. The plan eventually had to be put into action, and the force was evacuated from Greece. De Guingand was appointed an Officer of the Order of the British Empire in the 1942 New Year Honours.

==== Military intelligence ====
In February 1942, Dorman-Smith, by this time Deputy Chief of the General Staff (DCGS) at GHQ, recommended de Guingand for the vacant post of Director of Military Intelligence, Middle East, with the rank of brigadier. The appointment of de Guingand, an officer with no experience in intelligence, said much about the state of intelligence in the British Army at the time, where it was assumed that staff college training and a good brain were all that was required. Nonetheless, de Guingand ultimately proved to be very successful in this role. He selected two promising young officers at GHQ, Captain Bill Williams and Major James Ewart, to serve on his staff. Ewart could speak German fluently and Williams, as a trained historian, was accustomed to drawing information from disparate sources together to produce a larger picture. According to de Guingand, "Ewart and Williams were an ideal combination. They understood each other perfectly. Both had first-class brains, both were university dons and hated soldiering as a profession!"

De Guingand had access to accurate intelligence through Ultra codebreaking, but its interpretation always required skill and care. De Guingand made use of the Long Range Desert Group to confirm reports from other sources. Indications that the Germans and Italians were about to initiate what became the Battle of Gazala piled up in May 1942, allowing de Guingand to provide advance warning. In June 1942, he correctly predicted the Axis capture of Tobruk.

In July 1942, after the First Battle of El Alamein, de Guingand was appointed the Eighth Army's Brigadier General Staff (Operations) vice Brigadier Jock Whiteley. The staff arrangements at the Eighth Army headquarters were confused; General Sir Claude Auchinleck was both Commander-in-Chief Middle East and commander of the Eighth Army. Dorman-Smith, his DCGS in the former role, was present at Eighth Army headquarters, and as a major-general he outranked Whiteley. This created two lines of authority at the headquarters. De Guingand persuaded Auchinleck that Dorman-Smith would be more useful back in Cairo. De Guingand's General Staff branch had four GSO1s, Lieutenant-Colonel Hugh Mainwaring (operations), Lieutenant-Colonel L. M. (Spud) Murphy (intelligence), Lieutenant-Colonel Charles Richardson (plans) and Lieutenant-Colonel David Belchem (staff duties). To assist Murphy, de Guingand brought Williams from GHQ as the GSO2 (Intelligence).

==== Chief of staff to Montgomery ====
When Montgomery was appointed to command the Eighth Army in August 1942 he summoned de Guingand to meet him. He later wrote

The magnitude of the task in front of me was beginning to be apparent. I must have someone to help me, a man with a quick and clear brain, who would accept responsibility, and who would work out the details and leave me free to concentrate on the major issues–in fact, a Chief of Staff who could handle all the details and intricate staff side of the business and leave me free to command... Before we arrived at Eighth Army HQ I had decided that de Guingand was the man; I would make him chief of staff with full powers and together we would do the job... I never regretted the decision.

Montgomery had sent a request to the new Commander-in-Chief Middle East, General Sir Harold Alexander, that several officers be sent out from the UK, including Brigadier Frank Simpson, who had served as his chief of staff in the 3rd Division during the Battle of France in 1940 and at V Corps and XII Corps in the UK. Montgomery warned de Guingand that he might be replaced, but that if this occurred, he would attempt to secure him a good position in the UK. He recommended that de Guingand take over as Director of Military Intelligence (DMI) at the War Office. In the event, owing to the death of another officer, the War Office decided that Simpson could not be spared from his duties as deputy director of Military Operations, and de Guingand served as Montgomery's chief of staff for the rest of the war. Although common in other armies, the concept of a chief of staff was foreign to the British Army, where a staff was divided into separate general and administrative staff branches; at the Eighth Army headquarters the Chief Administrative Officer (CAO) was Brigadier Sir Brian Robertson, with Lieutenant-Colonel Miles Graham as his deputy. Under the chief of staff system, one officer was responsible for both operations and administration. This was a system that Montgomery strongly favoured; he had served as chief of staff of the 47th (1/2nd London) Division during the Great War.

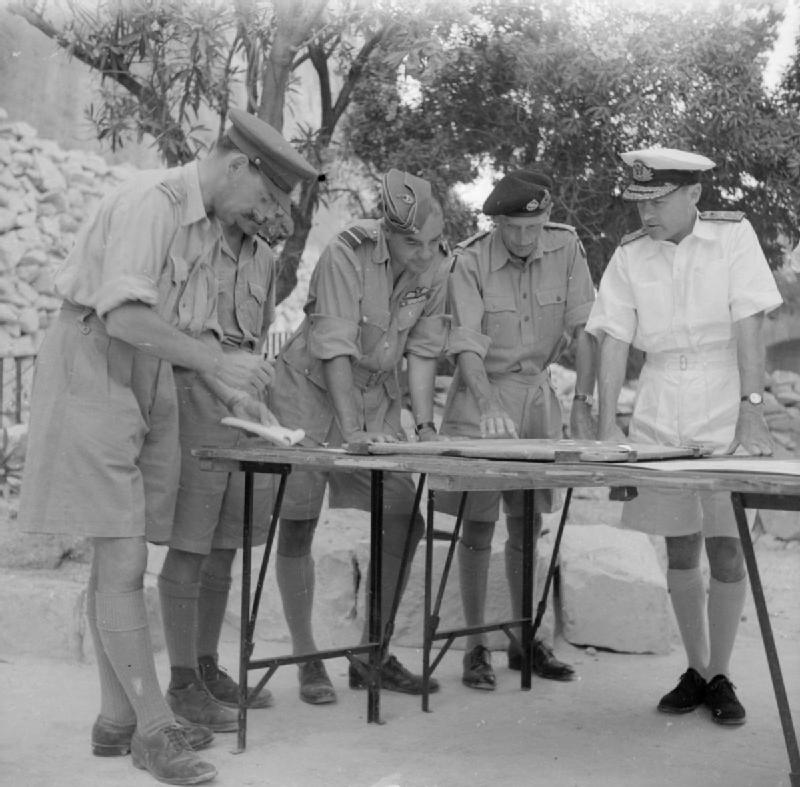
The British commanders of Operation Husky planning their operations in Malta, left to right: de Guingand; Air Commodore Claude Pelly; Air Vice Marshal Harry Broadhurst; General Sir Bernard Montgomery; and Admiral Sir Bertram Ramsay.

Montgomery moved the Eighth Army headquarters from Ruweisat Ridge back to Borg El Arab on the Mediterranean coast, about 20 miles (32 km) south west of Alexandria, where it was collocated with that of the Desert Air Force. De Guingand held a daily staff meeting at 07:00. He maintained personal contact with Robertson at Rear Army Headquarters and briefed Montgomery every night at 21:00 in the latter's map lorry. Ultra intelligence decrypted an appreciation by the German commander, Generalfeldmarschall Erwin Rommel, that indicated that he intended to attack in late August. The full moon needed for a major night movement was on 26 August, and a prohibition on reconnaissance near the Qattara Depression indicated that a flanking attack near there was likely.

Montgomery fortified Alam el Halfa ridge and brought in the 44th (Home Counties) Division to defend it. De Guingand and Williams concocted a ruse whereby they prepared a fake "going" map indicating that an area of soft sand near the ridge was suitable for vehicles but it is uncertain as to whether the Germans were fooled. In any event, the German attack, delayed for several days by fuel shortages, was repulsed in the Battle of Alam el Halfa. De Guingand urged that the Eighth Army carry out an immediate counter-attack but Montgomery did not consider that it was ready for this and passed up the opportunity in favour of a set piece battle.

Over the following weeks, de Guingand oversaw the preparations for the attack. When the preparations were complete, Montgomery decided that de Guingand looked tired and sent him back to Alexandria for a rest. De Guingand returned on 22 October. Contrary to his usual practice of locating himself at Main Headquarters (HQ) and paying daily visits to Montgomery at the forward Tactical Headquarters (Tac HQ), de Guingand established a small command post on the coast road near Tac HQ and those of X Corps and XXX Corps, which would be carrying out the operation. He took Richardson with him, leaving Mainwaring in charge back at Main HQ.

The Second Battle of El Alamein commenced at 02:00 on 24 October. Progress was initially good but by 02:00 the following night de Guingand was sufficiently disturbed by reports indicating the attack on the southern corridor had faltered to call an 03:30 conference at Tac HQ with the corps commanders, Lieutenant-Generals Oliver Leese (XXX Corps) and Herbert Lumsden (X Corps). De Guingand had to wake Montgomery, something that he later recalled he only had to do a few more times in the entire war. Montgomery agreed with de Guingand's evaluation of the situation. Operations on the southern corridor were suspended, and the forces there pulled back.

By 29 October, the Prime Minister, Winston Churchill had become concerned at the lack of progress and sent Alexander and the Minister-Resident for the Middle East, Richard Casey to investigate. Montgomery convinced Alexander that matters were well in hand but de Guingand had to call on his diplomatic skills to dissuade Casey from sending a cable to London indicating that the outcome of the battle was still in doubt. It was won on 2 November and two days later de Guingand dined with Montgomery and General der Panzertruppe Wilhelm Ritter von Thoma, the commander of the Afrika Korps, who was now a prisoner of war. Churchill ordered that church bells be rung throughout the kingdom to celebrate the victory. For his part in the battle, De Guingand received an immediate award of the Distinguished Service Order on 5 November 1942.

==== Health issues and personal life ====
Recurrent problems with gallstones struck de Guingand several times, often at crucial junctures and had the doctors had their way his tenure as the Eighth Army chief of staff would have been a short one. "The reaction of the bon viveur to his illnesses was unusual", Richardson later wrote, "he could not be called a hypochondriac, as there were very real, but he seemed to take an obsessive interest in their manifestations, and had an irrational faith in his many pills, and developed close friendships with his assorted medical advisors, so much so he was often in doubt whose advice to accept". During a visit to XXX Corps HQ near Benghazi on 21 November, he was struck down with excruciating pain and evacuated to a hospital in Cairo. The medical authorities recommended three months' sick leave in South Africa. De Guingand anticipated spending the rest of the war as a "base wallah" but Montgomery flew to Cairo to see him on 8 December and asked de Guingand when he felt he would be fit to join him again. De Guingand said he thought he would be fine in two to three weeks, so Montgomery went and spoke to the doctors and the medical board's verdict was changed from three months to three weeks.

While on leave in Cairo, De Guingand married Arlie Roebuck Stewart, the Australian daughter of Brisbane businessman Charles Woodhead, on 17 December 1942. She was the widow of a fellow officer in the West Yorkshire Regiment, Major Hugh Dalzell Stewart, who had been killed in the Battle of Keren in 1941 and had been working in Cairo for an intelligence organisation. They had one child, a daughter called Marylou who was born in 1944, but the marriage ended in divorce in 1957.

De Guingand returned to duty as chief of staff of the Eighth Army on 15 January 1943. He was advanced to Commander of the Order of the British Empire on 26 February "in recognition of outstanding services during the operations resulting in the capture of Tripoli" at the conclusion of the Western Desert campaign. When the first attack of the Battle of Mareth failed on 20 March, the Eighth Army was confronted by its first setback since Auchinleck had been replaced. Montgomery told his staff "Send for Freddie". De Guingand and Montgomery discussed what could be done to retrieve the situation and resolved to strengthen the left hook manoeuvre being carried out by the 2nd New Zealand Division (Lieutenant-General Bernard Freyberg). Air Vice Marshal Harry Broadhurst then came up with an innovative proposal to clear the way using fighters and forty light bombers. The attack was successful; the Mareth Line was breached and Gabès was captured on 29 March. For his part in the campaign, de Guingand was mentioned in despatches on 24 June 1943.

=== Italy ===
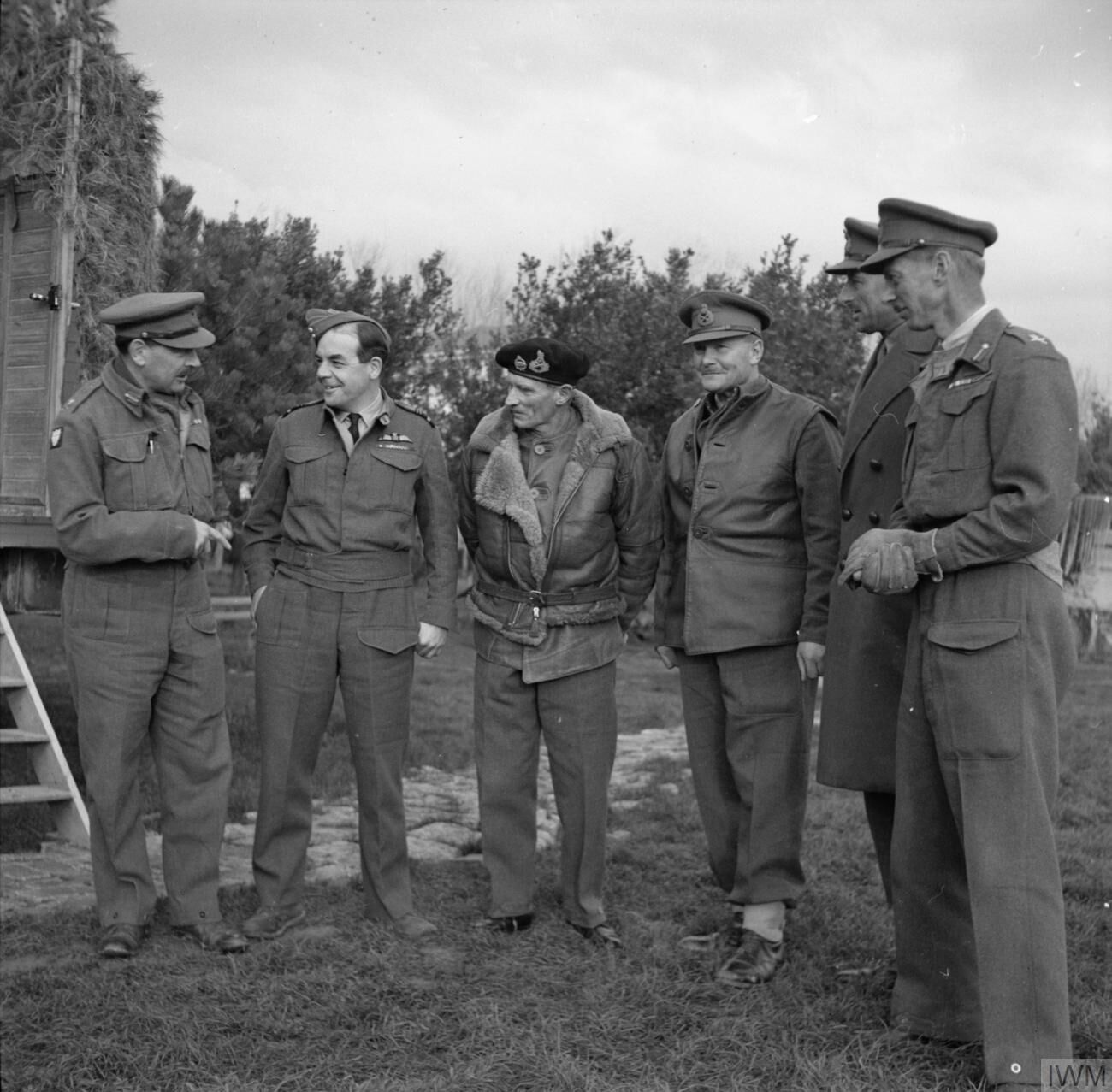
General Sir Bernard Montgomery with his senior officers at Eighth Army Headquarters at Vasto, shortly before handing over command of the Eighth Army to prepare for the Normandy invasion in England. Left to right: de Guingand, Air Vice Marshal Harry Broadhurst, Montgomery, Lieutenant-Generals Bernard Freyberg, Charles Walter Allfrey and Miles Dempsey

While the Eighth Army was still engaged in the Tunisian campaign, planning was in train in Algiers and Cairo for Operation Husky, the Allied invasion of Sicily. Unable to devote much time to it but concerned at how it was progressing, Montgomery decided that de Guingand would go to Cairo as his deputy, in charge of the planning group known as Force 545. In view of his new status and increased responsibility, de Guingand was granted the local rank of major-general. He arrived in Cairo on 15 April. On taking over the planning for Operation Husky, he became concerned that it called for a series of dispersed landings based on the assumption that the German and Italian forces would not mount a fierce resistance. This ran contrary to the Eighth Army's experience with them in the North African campaign. Montgomery listened to de Guingand's appreciation on 23 April and then sent a message to the Supreme Allied Commander, General Dwight D. Eisenhower in Algiers, urging that the invasion plan be changed to concentrate the landings.

Montgomery flew back to Tunisia on 26 April. His message had not been not received warmly in Algiers and Alexander had called a conference to discuss it. Montgomery fell ill, so he asked de Guingand to attend in his place. De Guingand's plane landed at El Adem to refuel. On attempting to take off, it crashed. The aircraft was a write-off but none of those on board were killed. De Guingand suffered a series of fractures and a concussion. He was unconscious for several hours and was flown back to Cairo in an ambulance plane. Staff officers retrieved his briefcase containing the invasion plans for Operation Husky from his wife's flat in Cairo. After consulting some X-ray images, the doctors gave him two weeks' sick leave.

Eventually Montgomery managed to convince Major-General Walter Bedell Smith, Eisenhower's chief of staff, of the merit of his plan and Smith was able to convince Eisenhower on 3 May. With the notable exception of Operation Ladbroke the airborne landing, which failed, the Eighth Army's assault on 10 July was successful. Montgomery went ashore the following day, only to find that his headquarters vehicles were missing. A sharp signal was sent to de Guingand, who managed to sort the problem out. For his services in Sicily, de Guingand was appointed Companion of the Order of the Bath on 12 October.

Even before the conclusion of the campaign in Sicily, preparations had commenced for the Allied invasion of Italy. Once again a series of dispersed landings was contemplated, based on the expectation that Italy would soon surrender and the Germans would withdraw from Italy. The Eighth Army had a supporting role, conducting Operation Baytown, a landing on the southern tip of Italy, while the US Fifth Army made the main assault, Operation Avalanche, at Salerno. Neither Montgomery nor de Guingand was in favour of the plan, with de Guingand arguing that Baytown should be cancelled. As they feared, the Germans did resist and as the weather deteriorated in October, the Eighth Army's advance ultimately came to a halt on the Winter Line.

=== North West Europe ===
==== Operation Overlord ====
When Montgomery departed from the Eighth Army on 3 December 1943 to assume command of the 21st Army Group in Operation Overlord, the Allied invasion of Normandy, he took several officers with him. These included de Guingand, Graham, Williams and Brigadier George Richards. It was not the normal practice in the British Army for generals to take staff with them from one assignment to the next but Montgomery judged correctly that his fame as the victor of the Battle of El Alamein would overcome any objections. De Guingand and Graham were granted the acting rank of major-general on 15 January 1944, with de Guingand's promotion backdated to 1 December 1943. At 21st Army Group, de Guingand replaced Major-General William Morgan, who went to Italy as Alexander's chief of staff. There were comments in London clubs to the effect that "the Gentlemen are out and the Players are just going in to bat."

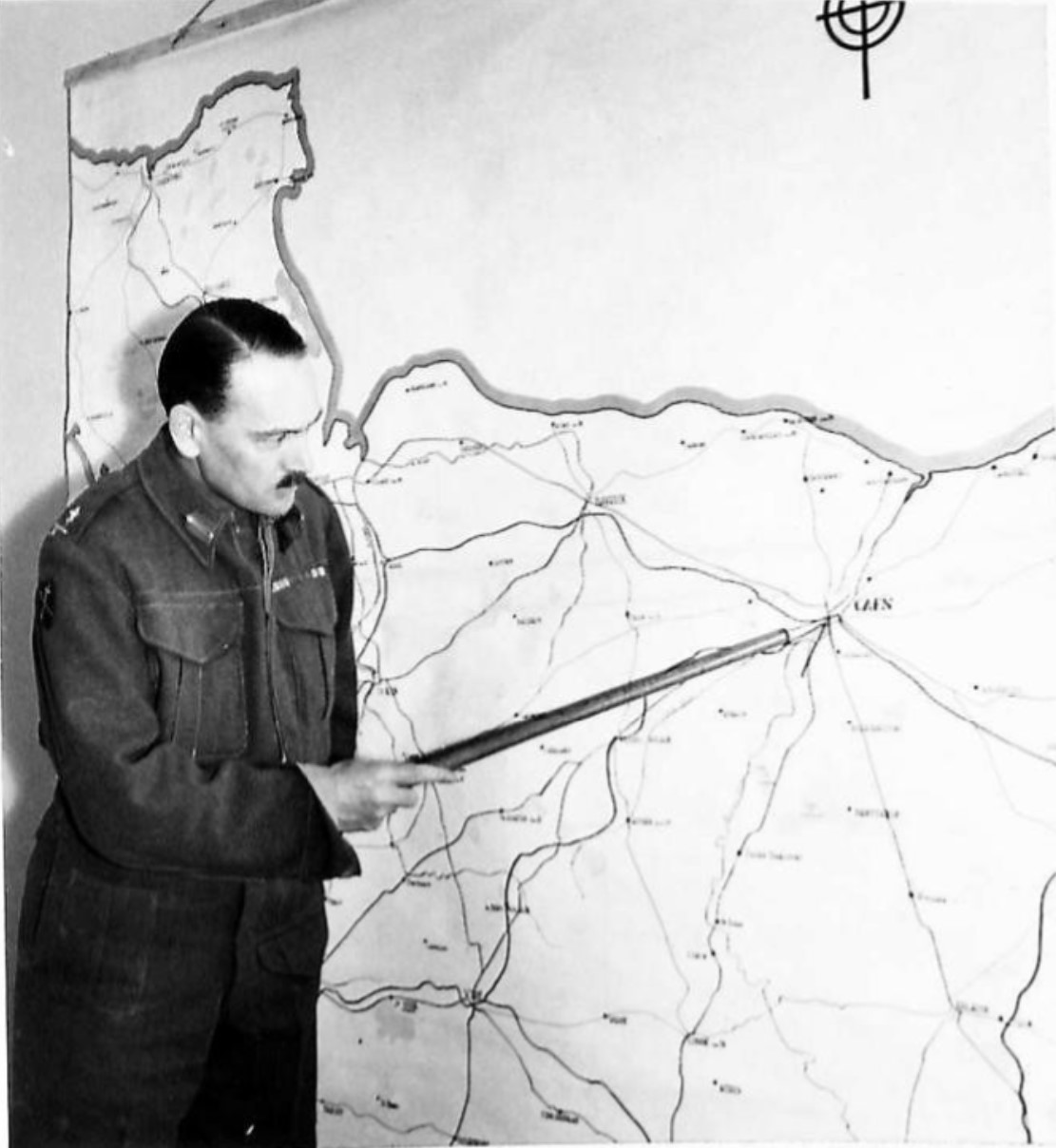
Briefing war correspondents on 28 July 1944

De Guingand arrived in the UK on 1 January and went over the Overlord plan with Smith the following day. The two were impressed by the amount of work that had been done by the staff of the Chief of Staff to the Supreme Allied Commander designate (COSSAC), Lieutenant-General Frederick Morgan, but they had concerns regarding the size of the assault, its narrow frontage and the speed of the build up. Taken together, these factors made it unlikely that the port of Cherbourg would be captured in less than two weeks but changing the plan to address these factors would require more aircraft, ships and landing craft; securing them would impose a delay. De Guingand and Smith arranged for a presentation to be given to Montgomery when he arrived and for a three-day conference at Montgomery's headquarters at St Paul's School, London where the plan and alternatives were discussed with the COSSAC, air and naval staffs. Eisenhower arrived in the UK on 15 January and another conference was held at his headquarters at Norfolk House on 21 January, where Montgomery's plan was tentatively accepted. Montgomery's rejection of the Overlord plan did not sit well with the COSSAC staff, who now formed part of Eisenhower's Supreme Headquarters Allied Expeditionary Force (SHAEF).

Montgomery once wrote to the CIGS, General Sir Alan Brooke about de Guingand, "I do not know what I should do without him as he is quite 1st class". De Guingand was indispensable to Montgomery, not only in battle but also in relations with the Americans. Montgomery was unpopular with them. In part this was due to American nationalism, but this was only a contributing factor. Montgomery's abrasive personality, his arrogance, condescension and frequent tactlessness, often worked against him and the British cause. Recognising his own limitations and de Guingand's diplomatic skill, Montgomery would often send de Guingand to meetings in his place, but this practice could also cause resentment.

In de Guingand Montgomery had a diplomatic but forceful advocate on controversial issues. De Guingand formed a close relationship with Bedell Smith, now Eisenhower's chief of staff at SHAEF and was able to smooth over many difficulties arising from Montgomery's poor relationships with many of his peers and superiors. De Guingand was highly respected by the Americans, General of the Army Omar Bradley, who served under Montgomery's command as the commander of the First United States Army and US 12th Army Group, described de Guingand as

Like Bedell Smith, a brilliant staff officer dedicated to anonymity and his job, de Guingand went one step further by complementing the personality of his chief. In Freddy, as de Guingand was affectionately known to the American command, we found a ready intermediary and peacemaker. For whenever the distant attitude of Montgomery ruffled a US staff, it was good old cheerful Freddy who came down to smooth things over. An able and professional soldier, de Guingand had served Montgomery since El Alamein. He was an able and sympathetic administrator, wise to and unpanicked by the crises and problems of war. Although Freddy's popularity with the American command stemmed partly from the adeptness with which he bridged our good relations, he was uncompromisingly devoted and loyal to his chief. De Guingand earned our affection not because he toadied to us but because he helped to compose our differences with justice and discretion.

==== Headquarters organisation ====
In the lead up to Operation Overlord, Montgomery left dealing with the details up to de Guingand and the staff, while he spent most of his time touring the country and talking to the troops. In his absence, de Guingand was in charge at St Paul's. He chaired the daily staff conferences and attended inter-staff meetings with his opposite numbers from the Royal Navy and RAF, Rear Admiral George Creasy and Air Vice Marshal Philip Wigglesworth. Montgomery noticed that de Guingand was showing signs of stress and fatigue and instructed Lieutenant-Colonel Harry Llewellyn to report to him if de Guingand was unable to carry out his duties. For the first time Montgomery's command included large numbers of American soldiers, so he asked Eisenhower to provide him with an American aide-de-camp. Eisenhower sent him two to choose from: Captains J. R. (Ray) BonDurant and Edwin (Bill) Carver. Montgomery chose BonDurant and with Eisenhower's permission also kept Carver, who became an aide to de Guingand. The American aides accompanied them on visits to American units.

A Tac HQ was organised under Major Paul Odgers, who was brought from the Eighth Army Tac HQ for the purpose. De Guingand was disturbed at this; while a Tac HQ was appropriate for a field army commander, he was not so sure that it was the best option for the commander-in-chief of an army group, who should have been able to function from main headquarters. De Guingand failed to convince Montgomery of this. One problem that de Guingand saw was that the most senior officers at Tac HQ were three lieutenant-colonels; the rest were all majors or below. He felt that a more senior officer was required, one that could act in his stead. De Guingand chose Colonel Leo Russell. Although Odgers liked him, Russell had an abrasive personality and no battlefield experience, which made it hard for him to earn the respect of the more operationally experienced officers at Tac HQ. He later came into conflict with Montgomery over the theft of a pig and Montgomery had him removed from Tac HQ.

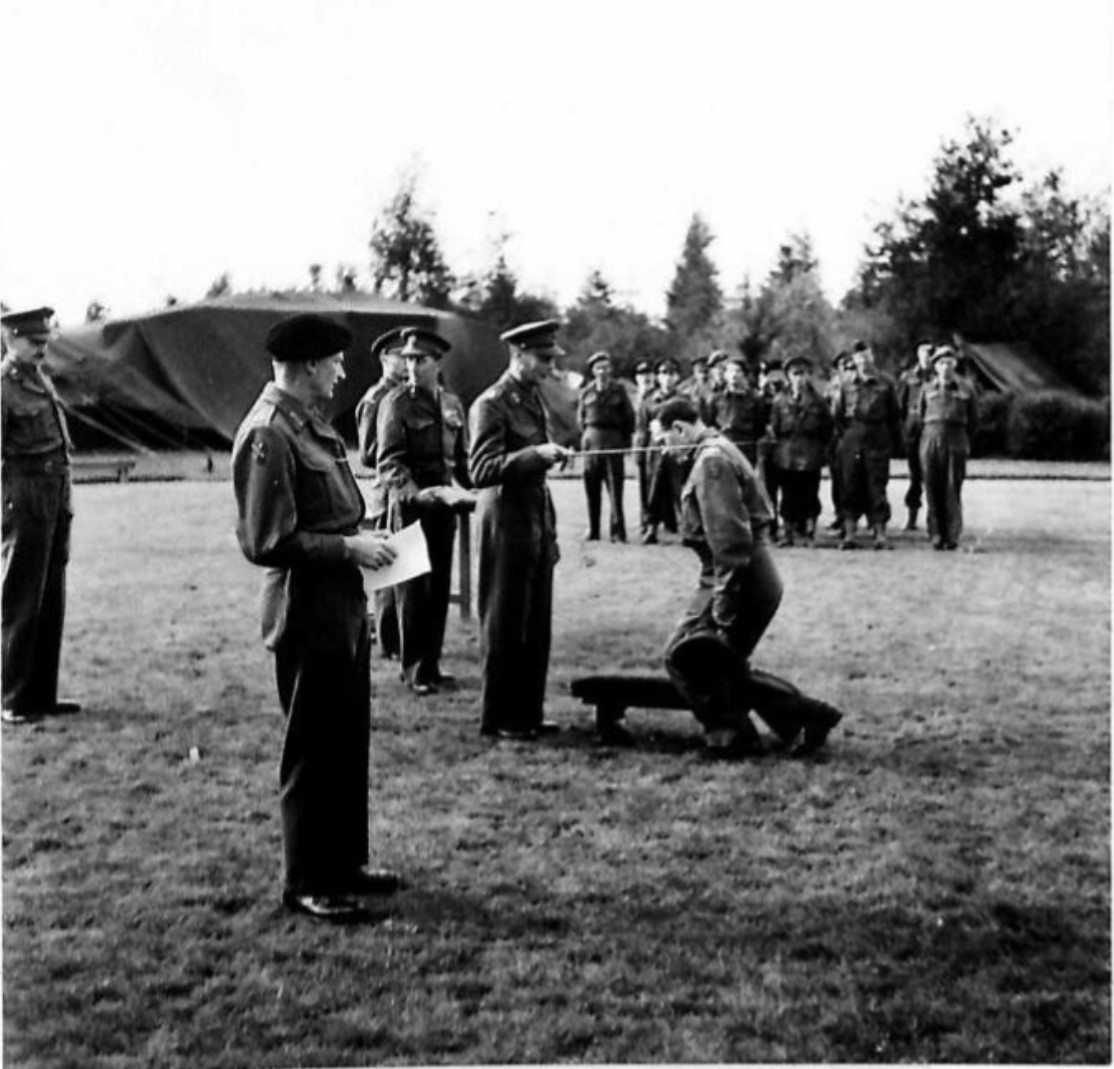
De Guingand is invested with his knighthood in the field by King George VI at Eindhoven on 15 October 1944.

On D-Day, Allied forces secured a lodgement in Normandy, but it was not as deep as planned, and the city of Caen was not captured. The arrangements for British logistics in the Normandy campaign worked well. De Guingand was frustrated by the separation of Main HQ and Tac HQ by the English Channel, which meant that he was no longer in daily face-to-face contact with Montgomery, although the two spoke on a scrambler phone. Main HQ finally moved to Bayeux in the second half of July.

For his role in Operation Overlord, de Guingand was further promoted in the Order of the British Empire when he was created a Knight Commander of the Order of the British Empire on 29 June 1944. This was an unusual (although not unprecedented) honour for a temporary major-general, particularly one who still held the substantive rank of major. He was invested with his knighthood in the field by King George VI at Eindhoven on 15 October, along with Lieutenant-Generals Miles Dempsey and John Crocker. De Guingand's substantive rank was advanced to colonel on 1 December.

==== Final campaigns ====
When American and British relations were strained in January 1945 after the Battle of the Bulge by Montgomery's continued advocacy of the appointment of an Allied land forces commander, Eisenhower threatened to send a signal to the Combined Chiefs of Staff indicating that there was an unbridgeable gap between him and Montgomery. De Guingand feared that Montgomery was about to be sacked. He was able to persuade Eisenhower not to send the message and was then able to persuade Montgomery to send a heartfelt and apologetic one to Eisenhower. He then arranged to meet with the war correspondents committee, which was chaired by Alan Moorehead and expressed his reservations about the news coverage of the battle and its effect on inter-Allied relations.

In March 1945, Montgomery summoned de Guingand to his caravan, where Brigadier Ernest Bulmer, the consulting physician to the 21st Army Group, was sitting beside him. Montgomery informed de Guingand that Bulmer had rendered a professional opinion that de Guingand was exhausted and needed a rest. When de Guingand protested, Bulmer listed the reasons behind his diagnosis. Montgomery and de Guingand then rounded on Bulmer, who offered to treat de Guingand with sedatives to help him sleep, on the proviso that de Guingand check in to a hospital in Brussels for 24 hours every two or three weeks. This deal was made subject to the war ending within three months. If it did not, then de Guingand would be relieved. That night, Montgomery brought de Guingand a cup of hot Ovaltine to help him sleep. Neither it nor the drugs had the desired effect.

For his part in the campaign in Borth West Europe, de Guingand was mentioned in despatches twice more, on 9 August and 8 November 1945. His services were recognised by the Americans with the award of the Legion of Merit in the degree of commander in April 1945 and the US Army Distinguished Service Medal in January 1948, and by the Netherlands with the Knight Grand Officer of the Order of Orange Nassau with Swords on 17 October 1946.

== Post war ==
=== Military career ===
After the end of hostilities in Europe in May 1945, Churchill proposed that de Guingand be appointed Montgomery's deputy military governor of the British Zone in Allied-occupied Germany, but the War Office rejected the proposal, and de Guingand was sent on six months' sick leave instead. He spent time recuperating but was still not recovered in July when Montgomery informed de Guingand that he had become aware that he was to succeed Brooke as Chief of the Imperial General Staff, and that he wanted de Guingand as his Vice Chief of the Imperial General Staff (VCIGS), provided that he was fit enough. De Guingand replied that he should be fine in three months' time, but Montgomery replied that it could not wait that long; Lord Alanbrooke wanted de Guingand to first gain some experience working at the War Office, which had changed greatly since de Guingand had last worked there in 1940. He wanted him to take over as DMI at the War Office, a post Montgomery had first recommended him for in 1942. Montgomery said he would talk to the doctors.

In a ceremony at the airport in Frankfurt, Germany, US President Harry S. Truman (third from left) presents the US Distinguished Service Medal to (left to right) General H. D. G. Crerar, Air Marshal Sir Arthur Coningham, Air Marshal Sir James Robb, and de Guingand (right).

De Guingand took up the appointment on 19 September 1945, but he was still suffering from insomnia and depression. He also had some personal problems: his wife Arlie was unimpressed with austere post-war Britain, and decided to pay a visit to her family in Australia. Although he had served as Director of Military Intelligence at Middle East Command, the job was quite different, as was the strategic environment. There was a considerable difference between dealing with threats that required immediate action, and the long-term issues and parsimonious government policies of the post-war world. His War Office colleagues were wary of him, fearing that he was the advance guard of another Montgomery "new broom" like the one that had swept through the Eighth Army in 1942, and the 21st Army Group in 1944.

The position of VCIGS came up sooner than expected. In January 1946, the VCIGS, Lieutenant-General Sir Archibald Nye, was appointed Governor of Madras. Montgomery and Alanbrooke met to discuss Nye's successor. Montgomery wanted de Guingand, but de Guingand had failed to impress Alanbrooke as DMI, and Alanbrooke said he wanted to appoint Lieutenant-General Sir Richard McCreery instead. Montgomery baulked at this. Alanbrooke felt that the war had not been won by the Eighth Army and 21st Army Group alone, and that there were many fine officers who had served elsewhere who should be reassured that they still had a place in the British Army. Montgomery and Alanbrooke then compromised in Simpson.

On 26 February 1946, Alanbrooke told de Guingand that his health was no longer good enough to perform effectively as DMI, and he was being placed on sick leave. He departed for Cannes in the south of France with his wife, child and daughter's nanny the following day. En route, he broke his nose in a fall at the Gare du Nord. It was later repaired by plastic surgeon Archibald McIndoe. In Cannes the family lived in a villa that Aly Khan lent them. Food was scarce in southern France, but the War Office supplied him with British Army rations for five people. While there he worked on his memoirs.

On 27 June 1946, de Guingand relinquished his temporary rank of major-general and reverted to his substantive rank of colonel. After representations from Eisenhower, he was promoted to the substantive rank of major-general on 10 September 1946, with seniority backdated to 22 March 1945. In February 1947 de Guingand retired from the army. He hoped to secure the post of Governor of Southern Rhodesia, but despite Montgomery's endorsement, he was passed over in favour of Major-General Sir John Kennedy.

=== Business career ===
De Guingand moved to Southern Rhodesia, where he was involved in an unsuccessful business venture with David Stirling, the wartime commander of the Special Air Service, as chairman of Gemsbok, a construction company founded by Stirling and his brother Bill. He moved to Johannesburg in South Africa in October 1947, and pursued a career in business as deputy chairman of Tube Investments Ltd. In 1960, he joined the tobacco firm Rothmans as chairman of their Britain subsidiary. He was the head of the South Africa Foundation, an organisation founded in 1959 by Harry Oppenheimer, whose chief goal was to block economic sanctions against South Africa due to its apartheid policies. On the occasion of his retirement on 9 December 1971, de Guingand strongly criticised apartheid and the government of South Africa, saying that it had become a pariah state with a network of despicable laws. This reflected an evolution of his own thinking.

De Guingand wrote books about his experiences. His wartime memoir, Operation Victory, was published in January 1947. The title was suggested by Moorehead. The book became a best-seller; it was serialised in The Times and ran through seven editions and two paperback impressions, but de Guingand unwisely directed his literary agent to negotiate a lump sum from the publisher, Hodder & Stoughton, instead of the royalties provided by the default contract. The book contained some controversial passages, most notably an account of the broad front versus narrow front controversy of late 1944, which would sour the post-war relationship between Eisenhower and Montgomery. Montgomery wrote a letter to de Guingand in longhand in which he praised the book, but noted that he could not recall de Guingand ever dissenting with him about his strategy. Graham went further and wrote a letter to The Times that was published on 24 February defending his wartime contention that the narrow front advance was logistically feasible. De Guingand later published three more books, African Assignment (1953) about his pre-war experiences in Nyasaland, Generals at War (1964) about the Second World War and From Brass Hat to Bowler Hat (1979) about his post-war experiences but they did not have the same impact as his first book. In 1973 he was interviewed on the British TV documentary series The World at War.

== Death ==
The long-standing relationship between de Guingand and Montgomery ended with the latter's death. On 1 April 1976, at the request of David Montgomery, 2nd Viscount Montgomery of Alamein, de Guingand, although only a major general, served as one of the eight pallbearers at Montgomery's funeral at St George's Chapel, Windsor Castle, along with Field Marshals Michael Carver, Lord Harding, Sir Gerald Templer, Sir Richard Hull and Sir Geoffrey Baker, Marshal of the Royal Air Force Sir William Dickson and Admiral of the Fleet Sir Peter Hill-Norton. De Guingand died on 29 June 1979 at the age of 79 at his home in Cannes, where he had lived since 1972. He donated two boxes of his papers to King's College London in 1972, which also holds his correspondence with Sir Basil Liddell Hart. His correspondences with Montgomery and others are held by the Imperial War Museum.

== Reputation ==
De Guingand is considered to have played a crucial role in the campaign in North West Europe. Richard Mead considered his partnership with Montgomery as "one of the great military partnerships, to be ranked alomgside Napoleon and Berthier." In his memoirs, Montgomery wrote of de Guingand:

His fertile brain was full of ideas and he was never defeated by the difficulties of any problem. He could take from me an outline conception of a plan, work out the staff details, and let me know quickly if it was possible from a staff point of view: and if not, what changes in substance were desirable. He accepted responsibility readily. I gave him full powers. If he couldn't get hold of me he would give a major decision himself and I never once questioned any such decision. I trusted him completely; he seemed to know instinctively what I would do in any given situation, and he was always right.

== Bibliography ==
- De Guingand, Francis (1947). Operation Victory. New York: Charles Scribner's Sons. OCLC 503437701.
- De Guingand, Francis (1953). African assignment. London: Hodder and Stoughton. OCLC 1677925.
- De Guingand, Francis (1964). Generals at War. London: Hodder and Stoughton. OCLC 878525462.
- De Guingand, Francis (1979). Brass Hat to Bowler Hat. London: Hamish Hamilton. ISBN 978-0-241-10165-0. OCLC 924954938.

== Notes ==
Military offices
Preceded by Sir John Sinclair	Director of Military Intelligence; 1945–1946	Succeeded by Sir Gerald Templer
