= William Bulmer =

William Bulmer may refer to:

- Sir William Bulmer (businessman) (1920–2012), English businessman
- Sir William Bulmer (politician) (by 1465–1531), English knight and MP
- William Bulmer (printer) (1757–1830), English printer

== See also ==
- Billy Bulmer (Sir James William Bulmer, 1881–1936), English public servant and rugby league player
