= Ernest Bulmer =

English physician and British Army officer

- Born: 27 July 1900; Newcastle-upon-Tyne
- Died: 2 June 1967 (aged 66); Birmingham
- Military career
- Allegiance: United Kingdom
- Branch: British Army
- Service years: 1939–1947
- Rank: Brigadier
- Service number: 88685
- Unit: Royal Army Medical Corps
- Conflicts: Second World War; Battle of France; Western Desert campaign; Operation Overlord; Allied advance from Paris to the Rhine; Western Allied invasion of Germany
- Awards: CBE; Officer of the Legion of Merit (US)

Brigadier Ernest Bulmer, CBE TD FRCP FRCPE (27 July 1900 – 2 June 1967), was an English physician and British Army officer who served in World War II. As a consulting physician with the 21st Army Group he saw duty in the Battle of France, the Western Desert campaign and the campaigns in north-west Europe.

== Early life ==
Ernest Bulmer was born in Newcastle-upon-Tyne on 27 July 1900, the son of Lilian (née Glover), a niece of Terrot R. Glover and Septimus Bulmer, a manufacturer of rope machines. He was educated at Dr Ehrlich's School, and then entered the University of Edinburgh, from which he earned the degree of MBBS with second class honours in 1922. While there he served with the University's contingent of the Officers' Training Corps.

Bulmer continued his medical studies with a year at a hospital in Paris, then undertook his residency at Birmingham General Hospital, where he became an assistant physician in 1925. He became a member of the Royal College of Physicians of Edinburgh in 1924 and a Doctor of Medicine the following year. In 1926 he became a member of the Royal College of Physicians, and was elected a Fellow in 1936. In 1927 Bulmer married Dr Eileen Wake, a fellow resident at the Birmingham General Hospital. They had one child, a son called Michael who became a biometrician.

== Second World War ==
On 8 May 1939, Bulmer joined the 14th Birmingham Territorial Hospital as a medical specialist, with the rank of major. He served with the British Expeditionary Force (BEF) in the Battle of France, and was in charge of the Medical Division of the No. 2 General Hospital in the Western Desert campaign from October 1940 to February 1943, with the temporary rank of lieutenant colonel, for which he was made an Officer of the Order of the British Empire.

After further service in the UK, Bulmer became a consulting physician to the 21st Army Group, with the rank of brigadier, in 1944. In March 1945, he rendered a professional opinion that Field Marshal Sir Bernard Montgomery's chief of staff, Major-General Sir Francis de Guingand, was exhausted and needed to be placed on sick leave. After Montgomery and de Guingand protested, he agreed to treat de Guingand with sedatives. This deal was made subject to the war in Europe ending within three months, which it did. For his services with the 21st Army Group, Bulmer was mentioned in despatches, raised to a Commander of the Order of the British Empire, and decorated with the American Legion of Merit in the degree of commander in person by General of the Army Dwight D. Eisenhower.

== Post-war ==
Bulmer left the Army in 1947 to become a physician on the staff of the United Birmingham Hospitals as a physician, and he remained as a senior consultant at Queen Elizabeth Hospital Birmingham until he retired in 1965. He remained a reservist, earning the Territorial Decoration in 1950. He retired from military service on 9 October 1954, retaining the honorary rank of colonel. In 1958, Bulmer was elected a fellow of the Royal College of Physicians of Edinburgh. He published papers on many subjects, particularly on gastrointestinal diseases, and the treatment of dyspepsia. During the war he investigated treatment for dysentery and tropical diseases, and military ailments like combat fatigue.

Bulmer served on the board of governors of the United Birmingham Hospitals, and as chairman of its medical advisory committee. He was president of the Midland Medical Society from 1959 to 1960, and chairman of the Birmingham Division of the British Medical Association from 1958 to 1960, and a member of it council from 1960 to 1962. He was on the Board of Clinical Studies at the University of Birmingham, and was its chairman for many years. He was president and a founding member in 1961 of the Society of British Gastroenterologists, and of the Association of Physicians of Great Britain in 1962. As a member of the Civil defence Committee of the Birmingham Regional Hospital Board, he helped prepare the medical arrangements for a major disaster. His last official appointment was as a deputy lieutenant for Warwickshire on 13 May 1967.

In later life Bulmer suffered from asthma. He died in Queen Elizabeth Hospital Birmingham on 2 June 1967.
