= John Bulmer (Independent minister) =

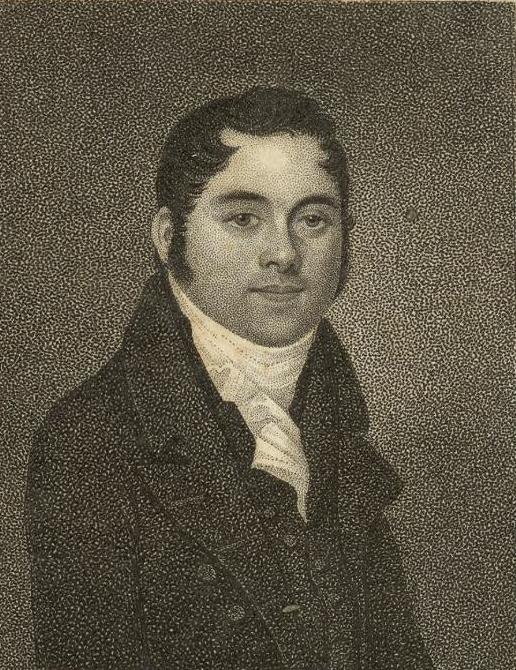
Portrait of Revd. John Bulmer, Haverfordwest

John Bulmer (1784 - 1857) was an Independent minister. He was born and grew up in Yorkshire, England, and was educated for the Congregational Ministry at Rotherham (Masborough) Independent College. He moved to Wales as pastor of Albany Meeting House, Haverfordwest in 1813. Whilst there he worked on and published a number of volumes of verse, sermons, and other religious material.

In 1840 he left Haverfordwest for a position in Rugeley. He held further ministerial positions in Bristol, Newbury, and (after an interval) at Langmore and Ruxton near Ross.

He died in 1857.
