= Miles Graham =

British army general (1895–1976)

Major-General Sir Miles Graham KBE CB MC DL
- As a lieutenant in the Life Guards in June 1918
- Born: 14 August 1895; Colchester, Essex, England
- Died: 8 February 1976 (aged 80); Rushcliffe, Nottinghamshire, England
- Education: Trinity College, Cambridge
- Spouse: Evelyn Catherine King (m. 1918; div. 1930)
- Military career
- Allegiance: United Kingdom
- Branch: British Army
- Service years: 1914–1919; 1939–1946
- Rank: Major-General
- Service number: 42505
- Units: Scottish Horse; Life Guards
- Conflicts: First World War; Western Front; Second World War; North African campaign; Operation Crusader; Battle of Gazala; Italian Campaign; Allied invasion of Sicily; North-West Europe campaign of 1944–45
- Awards: Knight Commander of the Order of the British Empire; Companion of the Order of the Bath; Commander of the Order of the British Empire; Officer of the Order of the British Empire; Military Cross; Mentioned in Despatches (5); Legion of Merit (US); Knight Grand Officer of the Order of Orange Nassau (Netherlands)

Major-General Sir Miles William Arthur Peel Graham, KBE, CB, MC, DL (14 August 1895 – 8 February 1976) was a general officer in the British Army. During the Second World War he was the chief administrative officer of the Eighth Army in the North African Campaign and the Italian Campaign, and of the 21st Army Group in the North-West Europe Campaign of 1944–45.

== Early life ==
Miles William Arthur Peel Graham was born in Colchester, Essex, on 14 August 1895, the son of Major Henry Graham and his wife Ellen Peel, the great-niece of Sir Robert Peel. His mother later became Baroness Askwith through her second marriage to George Askwith, 1st Baron Askwith. He had a younger brother, Henry Archibald Roger Graham. He was educated at Eton and the University of Cambridge.

== First World War ==
Graham was commissioned as a second lieutenant in the Scottish Horse, a yeomanry regiment of the Territorial Force, on 1 June 1914. On the outbreak of the First World War just a few weeks later, he was commissioned as a second lieutenant in the 2nd Regiment of Life Guards on 25 August 1914. He served on the Western Front, where he was twice wounded. He was promoted to temporary lieutenant on 9 November 1914, the substantive rank of lieutenant on 12 January 1915, and acting captain on 10 May 1918. He was discharged as a captain on 5 March 1919, but was placed on the Regular Army Reserve of Officers (RARO). For his services, he was mentioned in despatches, and was awarded the Military Cross.

On 17 June 1918, Graham married Lady Evelyn Catherine King, the daughter of Lady Edith Anson, the daughter of Thomas Anson, 2nd Earl of Lichfield, and Major Lionel Fortescue King, 3rd Earl of Lovelace. They divorced in 1930. They had two children; a daughter, Sheila Valerie Graham, and a son, Clyde Euan Miles Graham, who was killed in action in the Second World War on 23 September 1944. Between the wars, Graham was a successful businessman.

== Second World War ==
When the Second World War broke out in September 1939, Graham returned to his old regiment, which was now the Life Guards, with his old rank of captain. A wartime merger saw the Life Guards form part of the 1st Household Cavalry Regiment, one of the regiments of the 1st Cavalry Division, with Graham as its adjutant. Still a mounted formation, the 1st Cavalry Division moved to Palestine in 1940, and Graham became a staff officer at division headquarters. He then joined the headquarters of the newly formed Eighth Army, where he served in the Q (Quartermaster) Branch under the Deputy Adjutant and Quartermaster General (DA&QMG), Brigadier Sir Brian Robertson. For his services during Operation Crusader, Graham, now a major and acting lieutenant colonel, was mentioned in despatches on 16 April 1942, and he was made an Officer of the Order of the British Empire on 9 September 1942.

Robertson and Graham survived the purge of the Eighth Army staff that followed the arrival of Lieutenant General Bernard Montgomery as army commander in August 1942. Graham succeeded Robertson as DA&QMG when the latter became the Eighth Army's chief administrative officer. Robertson and Graham developed the concept of the Field Maintenance Centre (FMC) for the support of fast-moving mobile operations. An FMC was like a military shopping centre, supplying all the needs of a corps. It dramatically reduced the response time to administrative needs of front line units and reduced the amount of paperwork that they needed to do to get their needs fulfilled. The FMC would later become a feature of British logistics in the Normandy Campaign. Graham succeeded Robertson as chief administrative officer of the Eighth Army, with the rank of brigadier in March 1943, and was mentioned in despatches on 24 June 1943. On 28 June 1943, he married Irene Lavender Francklin, the widow of an Army officer, Lieutenant Colonel William Seely, Commanding Officer of the South Nottinghamshire Hussars, who had been killed on 6 June 1942 in the Battle of Gazala.

Graham was made a Commander of the Order of the British Empire on 14 October 1943 for his role in the Allied invasion of Sicily. When Montgomery was appointed the commander of the 21st Army Group in December 1943, he took only seven officers from the Eighth Army with him, the most senior being his chief of staff, Major General Freddie de Guingand; Graham, his chief administrative officer; and Brigadier George Warren Richards, his Armour officer. Montgomery also requested, and eventually secured, the service of Brigadier R. W. Lymer. Graham was promoted to major general on 15 January 1944, and became the Major General Administration (MGA) at 21st Army Group, with Brigadiers Randle (Gerry) Feilden, L. L. H. McKillop and Cyril Lloyd as his deputies.

Graham was made a Companion of the Order of the Bath on 29 June 1944, and a Knight Commander of the Order of the British Empire on 5 July 1945. He was mentioned in despatches on 9 August 1945, and 4 April 1946. He also received some foreign awards, being made a commander of the United States Legion of Merit on 15 March 1945, and a Knight Grand Officer of the Netherlands Order of Orange Nassau with Swords on 20 January 1947. He relinquished his commission on 28 March 1946, and was granted the honorary rank of major general. He retired on 6 February 1947.

== Later life ==
After leaving the Army, Graham joined the board of Times Publishing, and held several directorships. He served on the Nottinghamshire County Council, and was a Deputy Lieutenant for the county. He was the Chairman of the UK's leading greyhound company, the Greyhound Racing Association. Under his tenure they bought Catford Stadium in 1964. He lived at Wiverton Hall in Nottinghamshire, and died at Rushcliffe, Nottinghamshire, on 8 February 1976.

== Bibliography ==
- Mead, Richard (2015). The Men Behind Monty. Barnsley, Yorkshire: Pen and Sword. ISBN 978-1-47382-716-5. OCLC 922926980.
- Smart, Nick (2005). Biographical Dictionary of British Generals of the Second World War. Barnsley, Yorkshire: Pen and Sword. ISBN 978-1-84415-049-6. OCLC 58555546.
