= Bulmer (1809 ship) =

History

United Kingdom
- Name: Bulmer
- Owner: 1809:R. Bulmer; 1817:Somes & Co.
- Builder: Smith, Newcastle-upon-Tyne
- Launched: 20 June 1809
- Fate: Condemned and sold for breaking up in 1821

General characteristics
- Tons burthen: 45486/94, or 458 (bm)
- Notes: Flush-decked

Bulmer was launched in 1809 at Newcastle. She traded generally and served as a transport carrying troops. Then from 1815 on she traded with India. Damage in a storm as she was homeward bound from Bengal resulted in her being condemned in 1821 and sold for breaking up.

== Career ==
Although she does not appear in the registers for some years, ship arrival and departure information from Lloyd's List reveals a little. On 5 March 1810 she sailed from Portsmouth, bound for Lisbon. On 6 August 1813 she was one of several transports that sailed from Cork for St. Andero, presumably in support of the Peninsular War. In January 1814 she sailed for Palermo. In early March 1815 she was one of a large number of transports carrying troops and stores to Bermuda.

In 1814 the British East India Company (EIC) lost its monopoly on the trade between Britain and India. Thereafter, several owners started sailing in that trade under a license from the EIC.

On 6 November 1815, Bulmer, Hudson, master, sailed from Portsmouth, bound for India. She sailed via the Cape of Good Hope, bound for Bengal. She returned from Bengal via Saint Helena, and arrived at Deal on 11 December 1816.

Bulmer was offered for sale on 18 January 1817 "By Order of the Executors". The advertisement stated that she was of 458 registered tons, and had recently carried about 700 tons from Calcutta.

In 1817 Somes & Co. purchased Bulmer. Lloyd's Register for 1818 shows Bulmer with Wilson, master, changing to Hudson, Somes & Co. as owner, and trade London–Bombay. She had undergone repairs for damages and a good repair in 1817.

A list of licensed ships and their destinations shows W.W. West sailing Bulmer from England on 5 November 1818, and a second list shows Captain J. Barclay sailing her on 2 December 1819 for Fort William (Calcutta).

== Fate ==
On 28 December 1820 Bulmer, Barclay, master, sailed from Madras for London. A few days later, while still in the Bay of Bengal, she encountered a hurricane that so damaged her that on 6 January 1821 she had to put into Sadras Roads. There her cargo of sugar and saltpeter was pumped out, and it was expected that the rest of her cargo would be landed. She was surveyed on 2 February 1821 and the survey found her unseaworthy. On 12 February she was to be sold for breaking up.
