= Ted Bulmer =

Australian rules footballer

Personal information
- Full name: Edward Clarence Bulmer
- Born: 2 September 1889; Brighton, Victoria
- Died: 2 May 1953 (aged 63); Brighton, Victoria
- Original team: Brighton Beach

Playing career^{1}
Years	Club	Games (Goals)
1920	St Kilda	2 (0)
- ^{1} Playing statistics correct to the end of 1920.

Edward Clarence Bulmer (2 September 1889 – 2 May 1953) was an Australian rules footballer who played with St Kilda in the Victorian Football League (VFL).
