= Bulmer (directories) =

Series of Victorian era British informational guides

Bulmer was a Victorian historian, surveyor, cartographer and compiler of directories. His directories provided a history and geography of a particular area. The directories listed and described all parishes; listed trades and professions and provided a helpful street index with the names of residents, together with other local information. Data CDs of Bulmer Directories are available from publishers in the UK.

== List of directories ==
- Bulmer's History, Topography and Directory of East Cumberland, 1884
- Bulmer's History, Topography and Directory of West Cumberland, 1884.
- Bulmer's History, Directory and Topography of Westmorland, 1885
- Bulmer's History, Topography and Directory of Northumberland (Hexham Division), 1886
- Bulmer's History, Topography and Directory of Northumberland (Tyneside, Wansbeck and Berwick Divisions), 1887
- Bulmer's History, and Directory of Newcastle upon Tyne, 1887
- Bulmer's History, and Directory of North Yorkshire, 1890 (two Volumes)
- Bulmer's History, Topography and Directory of East Yorkshire and Hull, 1892
- Bulmer's Directory of Cumberland, 1901
- T. Bulmer: History, Topography and Directory of Westmorland, 1906
- T Bulmer: History, Topography and Directory of Furness and Cartmel, 1911
- Bulmer's History, Topography and Directory of Furness, Cartmel and Egremont division of Cumbria, 1911
- T Bulmer: History, Topography and Directory of Lancaster and district, 1912
- J Bulmer: History, Topography and Directory of Lancaster and district, 1913
