= Derbyshire County Cricket Club in 1921 =

1921 season of an English cricket team

Derbyshire County Cricket Club seasons
1921 season
- Captain: George Buckston
- County Championship: 12
- Most runs: Samuel Cadman
- Most wickets: Billy Bestwick
- Most catches: Harry Elliott

Derbyshire County Cricket Club in 1921 represents the cricket season when the English club Derbyshire had been playing for fifty years. It was their twenty-third season in the County Championship and they won five matches to finish twelfth.

== 1921 season ==
After the appalling results of 1920, George Buckston returned as captain at the age of 40 with the firm purpose of reviving a dispirited eleven. Buckston had not played county cricket since 1907, but his appointment was followed by a revival in Derbyshire fortunes. Derbyshire CCC played twenty games in the County Championship in 1921 and won five, to finish twelfth in the table. They also played a match against Dublin University on 16 July 1921, which was a win for Derbyshire by an innings and 133 runs and an additional match against Leicestershire. W T Taylor wrote of Buckston that "Only those who played under him knew how much the team owed to the skipper for his example, cheerfulness and leadership". Having achieved his aim, Buckston could not be persuaded to carry on. Instead, he was elected chairman of the committee.

Billy Bestwick was fourth in the national first-class bowling averages with 147 wickets for less than 17 runs each. He took 10 for 40 in an innings against Glamorgan at Cardiff and took five or more wickets in an innings in all but two matches. Samuel Cadman was top scorer.

With a considerable amount of new blood in 1920, there were no lasting additions to the Derbyshire side in 1921. John Fisher only played in two seasons and George Goodwin in just one season. George Buckley and Herbert Turland made one appearance each for the side, although Turland later played in a match for Nottinghamshire.

Additional players who appeared for the club in the Dublin University match were Geoffrey Bell and players called Dilnot and Freeman.

=== Matches ===
List of matches
No.	Date	V	Result	Margin	Notes
1	14 May 1921	Warwickshire; Edgbaston, Birmingham	Lost	8 Wickets	W Bestwick 9-65; Howell 8-69
2	18 May 1921	Worcestershire; County Ground, New Road, Worcester	Won	8 Wickets	A Morton 5–108, W Bestwick 7-67
3	21 May 1921	Nottinghamshire; Queen's Park, Chesterfield	Won	23 Runs	Barratt 5-68 and 5-39; Richmond 5-58; W Bestwick 5-82; A Morton 5-49 and 8-69
4	25 May 1921	Essex; County Ground, Leyton	Lost	Innings and 74 runs	JWHT Douglas 210 and 9-47; W Bestwick 6-132
5	01 Jun 1921	Yorkshire; The Circle, Hull	Lost	Innings and 112 runs	Derbyshire all out for 23 in second innings; E Robinson 100; Macaulay 6–3; W Bestwick 7-84
6	11 Jun 1921	Somerset; Recreation Ground, Bath	Lost	65 runs	W Bestwick 8-84 and 5-66; Robson 5-58; White 6-57
7	15 Jun 1921	Gloucestershire; Fry's Ground, Bristol	Lost	117 runs	Barnett 100; Dipper 104; J Bowden 108;Mills 5-51; Parker 5-121
8	18 Jun 1921	Glamorgan; Cardiff Arms Park	Won	2 Wickets	W Bestwick 10-40
9	22 Jun 1921	Somerset; County Ground, Derby	Lost	6 Wickets	White 5-56 and 8-120
10	25 Jun 1921	Worcestershire; Queen's Park, Chesterfield	Lost	6 Wickets	Pearson 106; W Bestwick 7–120; Gilbert 5-49
11	06 Jul 1921	Gloucestershire; County Ground, Derby	Lost	97 runs	W Bestwick 5-68; Samuel Cadman 5-20; Dennett 8-61; Parker 6-50
12	09 Jul 1921	Northamptonshire; County Ground, Derby	Lost	194 runs	W Bestwick 5-99 and 6-94; Murdin 6-87; Wells 5-30
13	13 Jul 1921	Yorkshire; Queen's Park, Chesterfield	Lost	Innings and 233 runs	Derbyshire out for 37 in first innings; Holmes 150; Robinson 5–16; Samuel Cadman 5-74; Macaulay 6-32
14	20 Jul 1921	Nottinghamshire; Town Ground, Worksop	Lost	48 runs	Richmond 5-89
15	30 Jul 1921	Warwickshire; County Ground, Derby	Drawn		L Oliver151; H Storer 126; W Bestwick 5-68
16	03 Aug 1921	Northamptonshire; County Ground, Northampton	Drawn		Murdin 5-89; W Bestwick 8-82; Thomas 5-59
17	06 Aug 1921	Leicestershire; Queen's Park, Chesterfield	Won	172 runs	Astill 6-64; W Bestwick 7-39
18	10 Aug 1921	Essex; County Ground, Derby	Drawn		A Morton 5-46
19	13 Aug 1921	Leicestershire; Aylestone Road, Leicester	Lost	Innings and 24 runs	Astill 108; W Bestwick 6-73; Banskin 7-48
20	20 Aug 1921	Glamorgan; Queen's Park, Chesterfield	Won	3 Wickets	Nash 5-58; W Bestwick 5-79; Clay 5-37

== Statistics ==
=== County Championship batting averages ===
Name	Matches	Inns	Runs	High score	Average	100s
A Morton	12	21	469	75*	29.31	0
SWA Cadman	20	38	945	92*	25.54	0
L Oliver	14	27	641	151	23.74	1
H Storer	19	36	758	126	22.96	1
G Curgenven	20	37	765	98	20.67	0
WJV Tomlinson	6	11	205	43	20.50	0
J Bowden	18	36	682	108	20.05	1
WWH Hill-Wood	1	2	37	24	18.50	0
J Fisher	2	4	45	39*	15.00	0
GW Goodwin	8	16	224	53	14.93	0
BSH Hill-Wood	2	3	29	21*	14.50	0
JM Hutchinson	20	39	527	67	14.24	0
GR Jackson	5	10	142	35	14.20	0
GM Buckston	15	30	299	71	10.67	0
CJ Corbett	5	9	103	44	12.87	0
H Elliott	20	38	307	37	10.96	0
W Carter	5	10	96	50*	10.66	0
W Reader-Blackton	5	10	72	27	7.20	0
W Bestwick	19	34	124	13*	6.20	0
GA Buckley	1	2	10	8	5.00	0
G Grainger	2	4	16	7	4.00	0
H Turland	1	2	1	1	0.50	0

=== County Championship bowling averages ===
Name	Balls	Runs	Wickets	BB	Average
W Bestwick	5613	2468	147	10-40	16.78
A Morton	2522	963	48	8-69	20.06
SWA Cadman	3085	1173	48	5-20	24.43
H Storer	1069	669	15	4-8	44.60
WJV Tomlinson	692	395	13	4-48	30.38
GW Goodwin	273	205	7	4-23	29.28
G Grainger	528	248	6	4-91	41.33
W Reader-Blackton	228	74	4	3-40	18.50
W Carter	144	158	4	2-42	39.50
J Bowden	42	18	1	1-0	18.00
BSH Hill-Wood	84	54	1	1-16	54.00
WWH Hill-Wood	72	90	1	1-90	90.00
JM Hutchinson	156	91	1	1-54	91.00
CJ Corbett	6	13	0		
L Oliver	12	30	0		
GA Buckley	60	48	0		

=== Wicket Keeper ===
- H Elliott - Catches 30, Stumping 7

== See also ==
- Derbyshire County Cricket Club seasons
- 1921 English cricket season
