= George Goodwin =

George Goodwin may refer to:

- George Goodwin (cricketer) (1898–?), English cricketer
- George Goodwin (journalist) (1917–2015), American journalist
- George Goodwin (publisher) (1757–1844), American publisher, father of George Goodwin Jr.
- George Goodwin Jr. (1786–1878), American publisher, businessman, and politician
- George Wayne Goodwin (born 1967), North Carolina politician
- George B. Goodwin (1834–1886), member of the Wisconsin State Assembly
- George Goodwin (actor) in The Pauper Millionaire
- George Goodwin (cyclist), in Herald Sun Tour

== See also ==
- George Godwin (disambiguation)
