= Wood baronets =

Set index for Wood baronets

There have been seven baronetcies created for persons with the surname Wood, one in the Baronetage of England, one in the Baronetage of Nova Scotia, one in the Baronetage of Great Britain and four in the Baronetage of the United Kingdom.

- Wood baronets (c. 1657): see Sir Henry Wood, 1st Baronet (1597–1671)
- Wood baronets of Bonnytown (1666)
- Wood baronets of Barnsley (1784): see Earl of Halifax
- Wood baronets of Gatton (1808)
- Wood, later Page Wood baronets, of Hatherley House (1837): see Page Wood baronets
- Wood baronets of The Hermitage (1897)
- Wood baronetcy of Hengrave (1918)

== See also ==
- Hill-Wood baronets
