= Derbyshire County Cricket Club in 1924 =

1924 season of an English cricket team

Derbyshire County Cricket Club seasons
1924 season
- Captain: Guy Jackson
- County Championship: 17
- Most runs: Guy Jackson
- Most wickets: Billy Bestwick
- Most catches: Harry Elliott

Derbyshire County Cricket Club in 1924 represents the cricket season when the English club Derbyshire had been playing for fifty three years. It was their twenty sixth season in the County Championship and they failed to win a match, finishing seventeenth in the County Championship.

== 1924 season ==
Guy Jackson was in his third season as captain. After a steady rise since in the championship table since the low point of 1920, the team slumped to the bottom again in 1924 without winning a match. Jackson himself was top scorer, and Billy Bestwick took most wickets with 65.

Players making their debut were Fred Heath brother of John, and Archibald Ackroyd both of whom played in a later season, but in few matches overall. Edward Bedford and Alfred Rose played their only appearances for Derbyshire in the season with one match each.

=== Matches ===
List of matches
No.	Date	V	Result	Margin	Notes
1	3 May 1924	Lancashire; Old Trafford, Manchester	Drawn		SWA Cadman 5–36; Parkin 8–20
2	7 May 1924	South Africans; County Ground, Derby	Drawn		
3	10 May 1924	Leicestershire; Aylestone Road, Leicester	Drawn		Geary 7–45; W Bestwick 8–36
4	17 May 1924	Glamorgan; Cardiff Arms Park	Lost	7 wickets	Spencer 5–32; Ryan 5–19
5	21 May 1924	Surrey; County Ground, Derby	Lost	6 wickets	Jennings 6–51; W Bestwick 5–64
6	24 May 1924	Lancashire; Queen's Park, Chesterfield	Lost	Innings and 1 run	Parkin 7–57 and 5–6; H Storer 5–27; R Tyldesley 5–30
7	31 May 1924	Worcestershire; County Ground, Derby	Drawn		
8	7 Jun 1924	Warwickshire; County Ground, Derby	Drawn		
9	14 Jun 1924	Yorkshire; Queen's Park, Chesterfield	Lost	137 runs	J Horsley 6–42
10	18 Jun 1924	Surrey; Kennington Oval	Lost	Innings and 34 runs	Jack Hobbs 118; Sadler 5–32
11	21 Jun 1924	Somerset; The Town Ground, Burton-on-Trent	Lost	Innings and 55 runs	MacBryan 132; Lyon 219; Bridges 7–56
12	25 Jun 1924	Northamptonshire; County Ground, Northampton	Lost	213 runs	Woolley 124; SWA Cadman 125; Wells 5–13
13	28 Jun 1924	Leicestershire; Queen's Park, Chesterfield	Lost	7 wickets	JM Hutchinson 143; Skelding 6–107 and 5–40; Geary 5–19
14	5 Jul 1924	Gloucestershire; Wagon Works Ground, Gloucester	Drawn		Salter 135; A Morton 5–92; Parker 6–124
15	9 Jul 1924	Somerset; Recreation Ground, Bath	Lost	192 runs	White 5–25
16	12 Jul 1924	Glamorgan; St Helen's, Swansea	Lost	Innings and 107 runs	Riches 170; Arnott 102; Davies 5–39; Ryan 5–71
17	19 Jul 1924	Northamptonshire; Queen's Park, Chesterfield	Drawn		
18	23 Jul 1924	Gloucestershire; County Ground, Derby	Lost	9 runs	Parker 8–35; A Morton 6–58
19	30 Jul 1924	Yorkshire; Fartown, Huddersfield	Drawn		Holmes 107; Rhodes 6–25
20	2 Aug 1924	Warwickshire; Edgbaston, Birmingham	Drawn		Hewetson 5–31
21	6 Aug 1924	Worcestershire; County Ground, New Road, Worcester	Lost	223 runs	Root 7–37 and 5–67
22	9 Aug 1924	Nottinghamshire; Trent Bridge, Nottingham	Lost	7 wickets	Richmond 6–76; Flint 6–53
23	13 Aug 1924	Essex; County Ground, Leyton	Drawn		A Morton 120
24	16 Aug 1924	Nottinghamshire; County Ground, Derby	Drawn		GR Jackson 103; Carr 101; JS Heath 5–54
25	20 Aug 1924	Essex; Queen's Park, Chesterfield	Drawn		

== Statistics ==
=== County Championship batting averages ===
Name	Matches	Inns	Runs	High score	Average	100s
JL Crommelin-Brown	3	6	202	74	33.66	0
WWH Hill-Wood	2	3	83	50	27.66	0
GR Jackson	23	38	855	103	24.42	1
SWA Cadman	22	38	799	125*	22.82	1
CJ Corbett	3	4	71	31	17.75	0
J Horsley	23	35	494	66	17.64	0
L Oliver	3	5	68	36	17.00	0
A Morton	21	30	442	120*	16.37	1
L F Townsend	24	37	556	79	15.88	0
JM Hutchinson	23	38	583	143	15.75	1
J Bowden	16	27	367	39	15.29	0
ST McMillan	2	3	30	24	15.00	0
FR Heath	3	4	59	17	14.75	0
JS Heath	4	5	59	28	14.75	0
AHM Jackson	6	8	103	56	12.87	0
FG Peach	2	4	58	32	14.50	0
W Carter	14	25	289	57	12.04	0
H Elliott	24	37	283	32*	11.79	0
R Pratt	3	6	51	17*	10.20	0
H Storer	14	26	178	18	6.84	0
A Ackroyd	4	6	38	15	6.33	0
T S Worthington	1	2	12	12	6.00	0
W Bestwick	19	29	80	18	3.63	0
WJV Tomlinson	1	2	4	4	2.00	0
EHR Bedford	1	2	3	3	1.50	0
JA Cresswell	2	3	2	2*	1.00	0
A Rose	1	1	0	0	0.00	0

=== County Championship bowling averages ===
Name	Balls	Runs	Wickets	BB	Average
W Bestwick	3544	1396	65	8–36	21.47
A Morton	4165	1458	62	6–58	23.51
J Horsley	3039	1166	55	6–42	21.20
L F Townsend	1886	723	26	3–20	27.80
SWA Cadman	2134	640	25	5–36	25.60
H Storer	738	309	15	5–27	20.60
A Ackroyd	633	256	8	3–50	32.00
JS Heath	258	183	6	5–54	30.50
AHM Jackson	61	17	3	1–0	5.66
FR Heath	71	47	3	2–4	15.66
T S Worthington	168	98	3	3–66	32.66
JA Cresswell	222	108	3	3–29	36.00
W Carter	312	222	3	1–21	74.00
JM Hutchinson	114	87	2	1–1	43.50
WJV Tomlinson	72	59	1	1–59	59.00
WWH Hill-Wood	156	104	0		
JL Crommelin-Brown	78	41	0		
GR Jackson	60	35	0		
CJ Corbett	18	14	0		
FG Peach	18	21	0		
J Bowden	6	1	0		

== Wicket-keeper ==
Harry Elliott Catches 29, Stumping 8

== See also ==
- Derbyshire County Cricket Club seasons
- 1924 English cricket season
