= George Buck (disambiguation) =

George Buck (c. 1560–1622) was an antiquarian.

George Buck may also refer to:

- George H. Buck Jr. (1928–2013), jazz record producer and curator
- George L. Buck (1866–1939), American teacher, businessman, and politician
- George M. Buck, Clerk to the U.S. Senate Committee on Privileges and Elections (ca. 1903)
- George S. Buck (1875–1931), mayor of Buffalo, New York
- George W. Buck (1789–1854), British civil engineer

== See also ==
- George Buck Flower (1937–2004), American actor, writer and director
- George Buckley (disambiguation)
