= John Crommelin =

John Crommelin may refer to:

- John G. Crommelin (1902–1996), American admiral and political candidate
- John Crommelin-Brown (1888–1953), British cricketer
