= Turland =

Turland is a surname. Notable people with the surname include:

- Heather Turland (born 1960), Australian former long-distance runner
- Herbert Turland (1894–1973), English cricketer
