= George Buckley =

George Buckley may refer to:

== Cricketers ==
- George Buckley (cricketer, born 1875) (1875–1955), Olympic Games cricketer of 1900
- George Buckley (cricketer, born 1889) (1889–1935), Derbyshire cricketer

== Politicians ==
- George Buckley (New Zealand politician) (1830–1895), 19th century member of the New Zealand Legislative Council
- George Buckley (Australian politician) (1881–1958), member of the New South Wales Legislative Council
- George Buckley (British politician) (1935–1991), British Labour Party Member of Parliament

== Others ==
- George Buckley (economist), British economist
- George Buckley (explorer) (1866–1937), Antarctic explorer
- George W. Buckley (born 1947), president, chairman, and CEO of 3M
- G. B. Buckley (George Bent Buckley, 1885–1962), English surgeon and cricket historian
