= Wood baronetcy of Hengrave (1918) =

Escutcheon of the Wood baronets of Hengrave

The Wood baronetcy, of Hengrave in the County of Suffolk, was created in the Baronetage of the United Kingdom on 14 February 1918 for John Wood, Conservative Member of Parliament for Stalybridge and Stalybridge and Hyde. The title became extinct on the death of the 2nd Baronet in 1974.

== Wood baronets, of Hengrave (1918) ==
- Sir John Wood, 1st Baronet (1857–1951)
- Sir John Arthur Haigh Wood, 2nd Baronet (1888–1974)

== Extended family ==
Sir Samuel Hill-Wood, 1st Baronet, of Morfield, was the first cousin of the 1st Baronet (see Hill-Wood baronets). Their respective fathers Samuel Wood and John Hill Wood were brothers, who had married the sisters Anne Kershaw and Emma Sidebottom.
