= Frederick Heath =

Frederick Heath may refer to:

- Johnny Kidd (singer) (Frederick Heath, 1935–1966), English singer and songwriter
- Frederick Heath (architect) (1861–1953), American architect
- Frederick Heath (cricketer) (1894–1967), English cricketer
- Frederick Heath (footballer) (1865–?), English professional footballer

== See also ==
- Frederic Heath (1864–1954), American socialist politician and journalist
