= Wilfred Hill-Wood =

English cricketer and financier

Sir Wilfred Hill-Wood KCVO CBE
Personal information
- Full name: Wilfred William Hill Hill-Wood
- Born: 8 September 1901; Chelsea, London, England
- Died: 10 October 1980 (aged 79); Kensington, London, England
- Batting: Right-handed
- Bowling: Leg-break
- Relatives: Samuel Hill-Wood (father); Basil Hill-Wood (brother); Denis Hill-Wood (brother); Charles Hill-Wood (brother)

Domestic team information
- Years: Team
- 1919–1936: Derbyshire
- 1921–1922: Cambridge University
- 1938–1939: MCC
- FC debut: 8 August 1919 Derbyshire v Northamptonshire
- Last FC: 28 June 1939 MCC v Oxford Univ.

Career statistics
Competition	First-class
Matches	63
Runs scored	2,848
Batting average	27.65
100s/50s	3/15
Top score	122*
Balls bowled	3,679
Wickets	65
Bowling average	34.41
5 wickets in innings	1
10 wickets in match	0
Best bowling	5/62
Catches/stumpings	35/–
- Source: CricketArchive, 14 July 2010

Sir Wilfred William Hill Hill-Wood KCVO CBE (8 September 1901 – 10 October 1980) was an English financier and cricketer who played first-class cricket for Derbyshire between 1919 and 1936, as well as for Cambridge University and Marylebone Cricket Club (MCC).

== Early life ==
Hill-Wood was the second son of Sir Samuel Hill-Wood, 1st Baronet, and his wife Hon. Rachel Bateman-Hanbury. His father was a Member of Parliament and had also played cricket for Derbyshire. He was educated at Ludgrove and Eton, where he played for the first XI, appearing in the Eton-Harrow match in 1918, 1919 and 1920. He then went to Trinity College, Cambridge.

== Cricketing career ==
Hill-Wood made his debut for Derbyshire in the 1919 season when he took 2 wickets and scored a total of 49 in two innings against Northamptonshire. He played two more games in 1919 and next played one game for Derbyshire in the 1921 season. In 1921 and 1922 he was playing for Cambridge University. He took part in a Marylebone Cricket Club (MCC) tour of New Zealand in 1922/23 and was a regular in the Derbyshire side in the 1923 season

Towards the end of the season, he was the subject of an article by Neville Cardus in the Guardian:

“The contrast between Hill-Wood’s strokes as they flashed from his bat and the ugliness of his stance as the bowler ran to the crease was intriguing. Surely so much of radiance, never before went hand-in-hand, with sheer distortion on the cricket field, as when Hill-Wood plays a long innings. As he awaits the ball, he is in an attitude, both angular and flat; he is “cut in two”, so to say, by a bend in the body that gives us a lively suggestion of a right-angle come to life. Even as the ball passes through the air towards him, Hill-Wood's body remains cramped and unlovely, his bat making a spasmodic up-and-down movement. Then if at the last second, the ball turns out right for hitting, Hill-Wood suffers a sudden transformation-quick as thought his body throws off its cramping angles, and becomes erect while the bat accomplishes the stroke. It all happens as though, suddenly, Hill-Wood had broken free from chains; the transformation, indeed, might well suggest a livelier metaphor-that the batsmen emerges at the critical moment in his own useful and confident image after casting away a magic cap or Tarnhelm that has been disguising his true shape in the shape of crabbed age.”

He played two matches for Derbyshire in the 1924 season and five for them in the 1925 season in which years he also played for the Eton Ramblers. In 1932/33 he played during a tour of India, and performed again for Derbyshire in the 1935 and 1936 seasons. His last matches were in 1938 and 1939 for the MCC against the universities. Hill-Wood was a right hand batsman and played 60 innings for Derbyshire in 35 matches. His top score was 107 and his average 25.74. He played 21 innings in 14 matches for Cambridge University with a top score of 81. He was a leg-break bowler and took 49 wickets at an average 31.08 for Derbyshire. He took 14 wickets at an average of 28.85 for Cambridge University. His best overall match count was 5 for 62.

== Financial career ==
Hill-Wood was managing director of Morgan, Grenfell & Co. 1939–67, and during the Second World War was with the British Purchasing Commission. He was Chairman of Eversholt Estate Development and vice-president of St Pancras Housing Association.

He was appointed a Commander of the Order of the British Empire (CBE) in the 1946 New Year Honours for his work as Director, Western Area, Postal and Telegraph Censorship Department. He was a personal friend of King George VI and advised the royal family on financial affairs. He was knighted in the 1976 Birthday Honours as a Knight Commander of the Royal Victorian Order (KCVO), an order in the personal gift of The Queen.

== Family ==
As well as his father, Hill-Wood's brothers Basil, Denis and Charles played cricket for Derbyshire.
