= Denis Hill-Wood =

English football chairman and cricketer

Denis Hill-Wood MC
Personal information
- Full name: Denis John Charles Hill Hill-Wood
- Born: 25 June 1906; Hoxne, Suffolk, England
- Died: 5 May 1982 (aged 75); Hartley Wintney, Hampshire, England
- Batting: Right-handed
- Relatives: Samuel Hill-Wood (father); Basil Hill-Wood (brother); Wilfred Hill-Wood (brother); Charles Hill-Wood (brother)

Domestic team information
- Years: Team
- 1928–1929: Derbyshire
- FC debut: 23 May 1928 Oxford University v Derbyshire
- Last FC: 22 June 1929 Derbyshire v Kent

Career statistics
Competition	First-class
Matches	12
Runs scored	453
Batting average	22.65
100s/50s	0/2
Top score	85
Balls bowled	222
Wickets	3
Bowling average	41.00
5 wickets in innings	0
10 wickets in match	0
Best bowling	1/4
Catches/stumpings	6/–
- Source: ESPNCricinfo, February 2012

Denis John Charles Hill Hill-Wood MC (25 June 1906 – 5 May 1982) was the chairman of Arsenal Football Club from 1962 until 1982. He was also an English cricketer who played First Class cricket for Oxford University and Marylebone Cricket Club (MCC) in 1928 and Derbyshire in 1928 and 1929.

== Early life ==
Hill-Wood was the third son of Sir Samuel Hill-Wood, 1st Baronet, who was chairman of Arsenal for twenty years, as well as a first-class cricketer for Derbyshire.

Hill-Wood was educated at Ludgrove School followed by Eton and Christ Church, Oxford. Hill-Wood went to Oxford University and played seven matches for the university in the 1928 season.

He played for MCC in Ireland and made his first-class debut for Derbyshire at the end of the 1928 season when he played three matches. He played one match in the 1929 season.

== Military Service ==
During the Second World War he served with the Royal Armoured Corps and was wounded in Libya. With other officers he was awarded the Military Cross in 1943 "in recognition of gallant and distinguished services in the Middle East".

== Career ==
Similarly to his father, Denis became chairman of Arsenal football club in 1962, a job which he held until his death in 1982. A bust of Hill-Wood was commissioned and used to stand inside the Directors' Landing of the East Stand of Arsenal's Highbury stadium, and now stands in the Directors' Entrance of Emirates Stadium after Arsenal's move there.

Denis had three brothers who also took part in first-class cricket for Derbyshire, the others being Basil Hill-Wood, Wilfred and Charles. Denis's son, Peter, played one first-class match in 1960.
