= Royal Scots Fusiliers =

Military unit of the British Army

- Regimental cap badge
- Active: 1678–1959
- Country: Kingdom of Scotland (1678–1688); Kingdom of England (1688–1707); Kingdom of Great Britain (1707–1800); United Kingdom (1801–1959)
- Branch: British Army
- Type: Infantry
- Role: Line infantry
- Part of: Lowland Brigade
- Garrison/HQ: Churchill Barracks, Ayr
- Nicknames: Duke of Marlborough's Own; The Grey Breeks
- Motto: Nec Aspera Terrent (Hardships do not deter us)
- March: Highland Laddie (Pipes)

Insignia
- Hackle: White
- Tartan: Hunting Erskine

The Royal Scots Fusiliers was a line infantry regiment of the British Army that existed from 1678 until 1959 when it was amalgamated with the Highland Light Infantry (City of Glasgow Regiment) to form the Royal Highland Fusiliers (Princess Margaret's Own Glasgow and Ayrshire Regiment) which was later itself merged with the Royal Scots, King's Own Scottish Borderers, the Black Watch (Royal Highland Regiment), the Argyll and Sutherland Highlanders and the Highlanders (Seaforth, Gordons and Camerons) to form a new large regiment, the Royal Regiment of Scotland.

== History ==
=== Naming Conventions ===
In the late 17th century, many English and Scottish politicians viewed standing armies or permanent units as a danger to the liberties of the individual and a threat to society itself. The experience of the Wars of the Three Kingdoms and the use of troops by both the Protectorate and James VII and II to repress political dissent created strong resistance to permanent units owing allegiance to the Crown or State. Regiments were deliberately treated as the personal property of their current Colonel, carried his name which changed when transferred and disbanded as soon as possible. This makes tracing the origins of modern regiments very complex, particularly since many regimental histories were written in the late 19th or early 20th century. This was partly due to the 1881 Childers Reforms; the abolition of the numbering system for regiments was as bitterly resisted then as the various amalgamations have been since and establishing precedence or age became almost an obsession.

=== The Earl of Mar's Regiment of Foot (1678–1689) ===
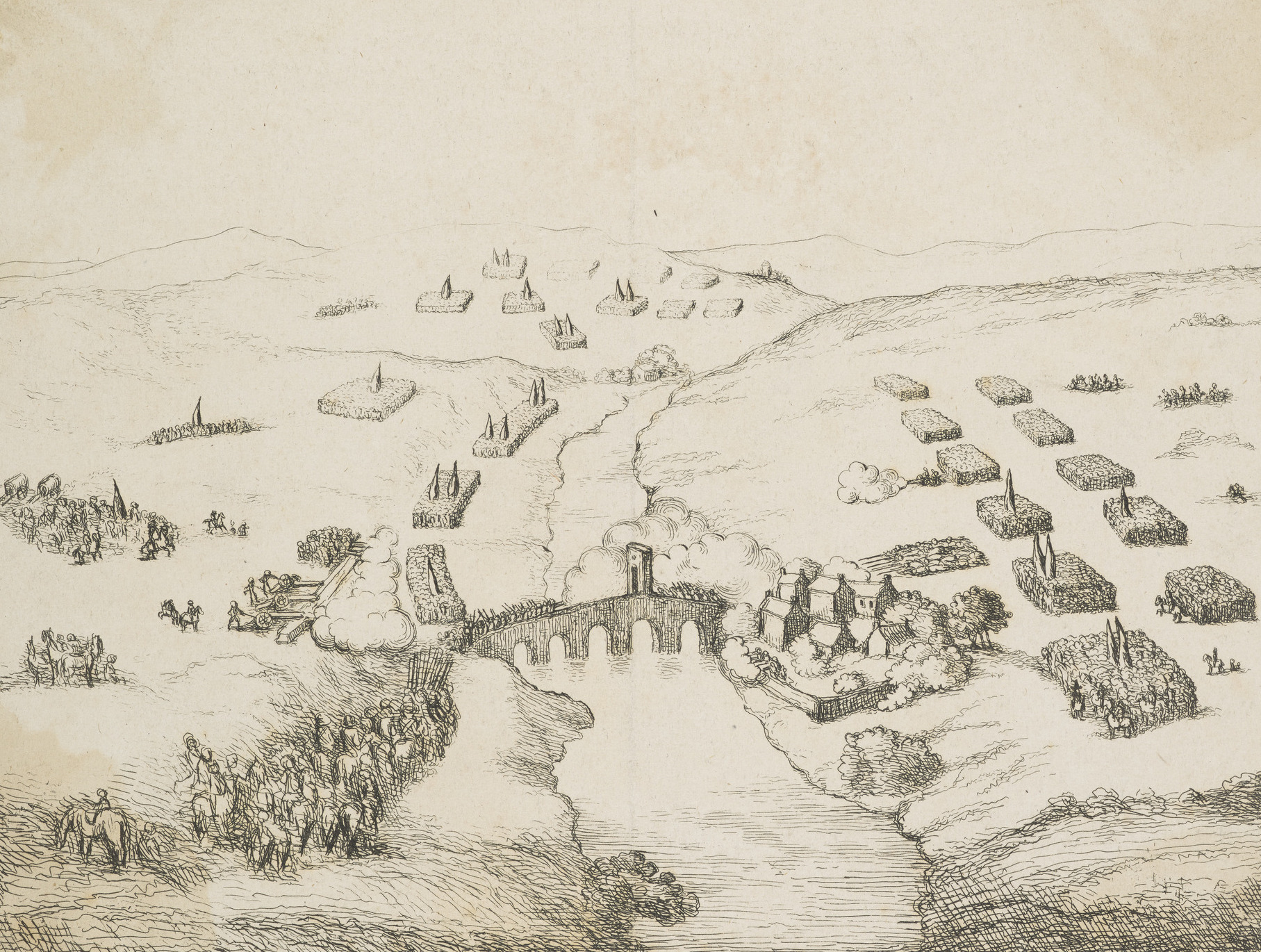
The Battle of Bothwell Bridge, which the regiment fought in

The regiment was formed in Scotland in September 1678 by the Earl of Mar for service against dissident Covenanters and helped suppress Presbyterian rebellions at the Battle of Bothwell Bridge in 1679 and the 1685 Argyll's Rising. Thomas Buchan, a Scottish Catholic and professional soldier replaced the Earl as Colonel in July 1686.

When William of Orange landed in England on 5 November 1688 in what became known as the Glorious Revolution, the regiment was shipped to London. There was very little fighting; the vast majority of James VII and II's army simply changed sides and Buchan followed him into exile in France. The position of Colonel was filled in March 1689 by Francis Fergus O'Farrell, an Irishman who had served William since 1674 and it became O'Farrell's Regiment in accordance with the practice of the time.

=== The Nine Years War and Scotland (1689–1702) ===
The regiment spent the Nine Years' War in Flanders and took part in most of the major engagements, including Walcourt, Steinkirk and Landen. In July 1695, it was part of the garrison when O'Farrell surrendered Deinze to the French without resistance. The regiment became prisoners until exchanged in September; Ellenberg, commander of Diksmuide which surrendered in a similar fashion at the same time was executed, while O'Farrell was cashiered along with eight other officers. The officers concerned were later reinstated with O'Farrell ending his career as a Major-General.

His replacement was Robert Mackay, nephew of Hugh Mackay former commander of the Dutch Scots Brigade; he died in December 1696 and was succeeded by another Scot, Colonel Archibald Row. After the Treaty of Ryswick ended the Nine Years' War in September 1697, the regiment went to Scotland where it spent the next few years.

The date at which it became a Fusilier unit is debated, but it first appears as O'Farrell's Fusiliers on an Army list of 1691. 'Fusilier' is a specific designation while 'fusil' was originally a light-weight musket carried by units guarding the artillery train, so it may have been equipped with these before 1691. The original Fusilier regiments all had an exploding bomb emblem, so it may also relate to grenades; for example, only Fusilier regiments, the Grenadier Guards plus one or two others were later allowed to use the British Grenadiers regimental march.

=== The War of the Spanish Succession (1702–1713) ===
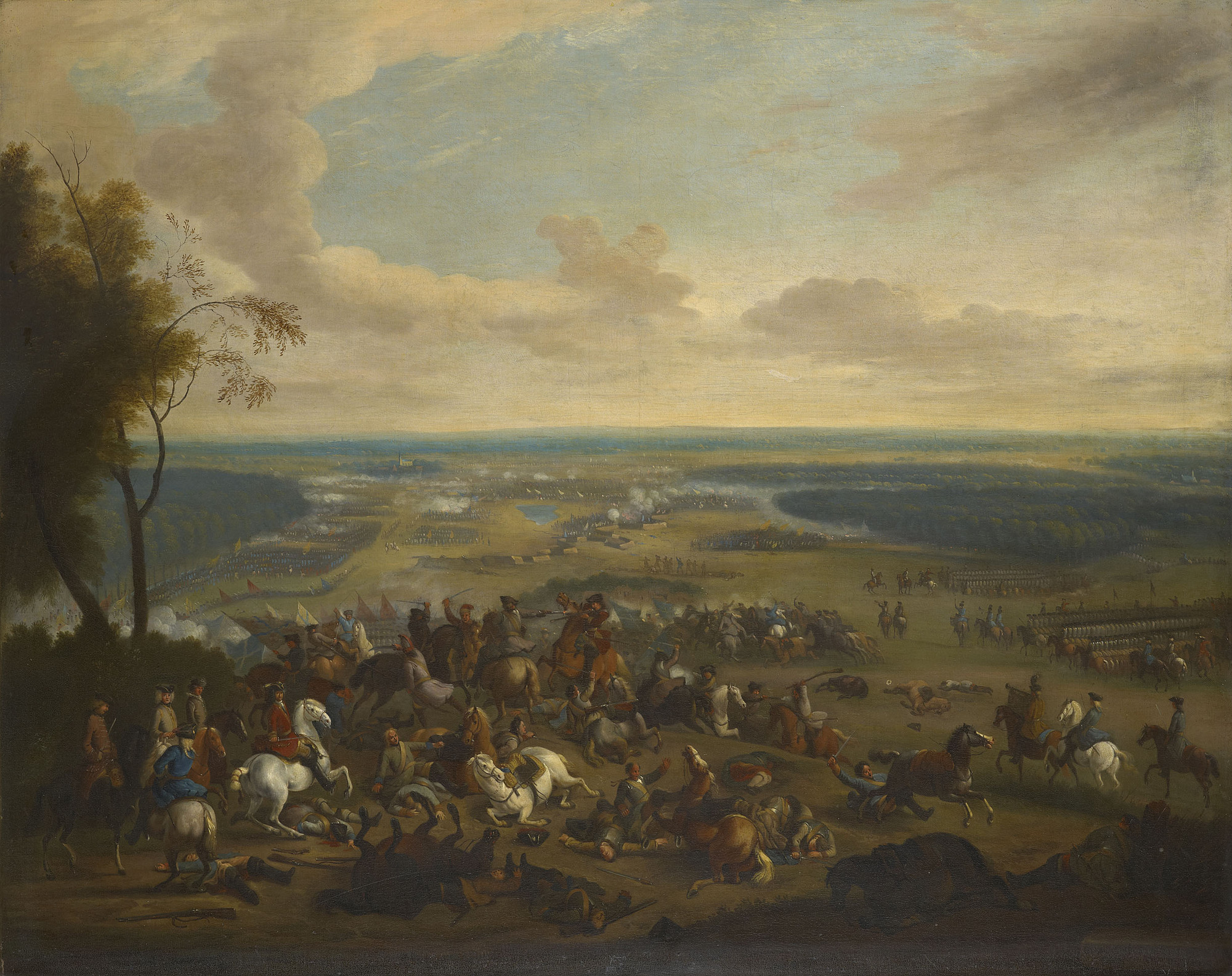
The Battle of Malplaquet, at which the regiment's colonel was killed

The Regiment returned to Flanders when the War of the Spanish Succession began in May 1702 and formed part of the army led by the Duke of Marlborough. In August 1704, the regiment took part in the Battle of Blenheim; in their assault on the village, now Brigadier-General Row famously ordered his men not to fire until he struck his sword upon the palisade; he was shot and mortally wounded as he did so. The regiment suffered heavy casualties, the new Colonel being Viscount Mordaunt, who himself lost an arm at Blenheim.

Shortly after the Battle of Ramillies in May 1706, Mordaunt exchanged regiments with Colonel Sampson de Lalo, a French Huguenot refugee who previously commanded what later became the 28th Regiment of Foot. Under de Lalo, it fought at Oudenarde and the capture of Lille, one of the strongest defences in Europe whose Citadel is regarded as Vauban's masterpiece. De Lalo was killed at Malplaquet in September 1709, a battle technically an Allied victory but which incurred casualties so severe they shocked Europe.

Malplaquet and the huge financial costs of the war meant the focus changed to capturing fortresses as each side attempted to improve its bargaining position prior to peace talks; the war ended in 1713 by the Treaty of Utrecht. Mordaunt, reappointed Colonel after de Lalo's death, died of smallpox in April 1710 and was succeeded by Thomas Meredyth. He was dismissed for political reasons in December and replaced by the Earl of Orrery.

=== 21st (Royal North British Fusilier) Regiment of Foot (1713–1877) ===
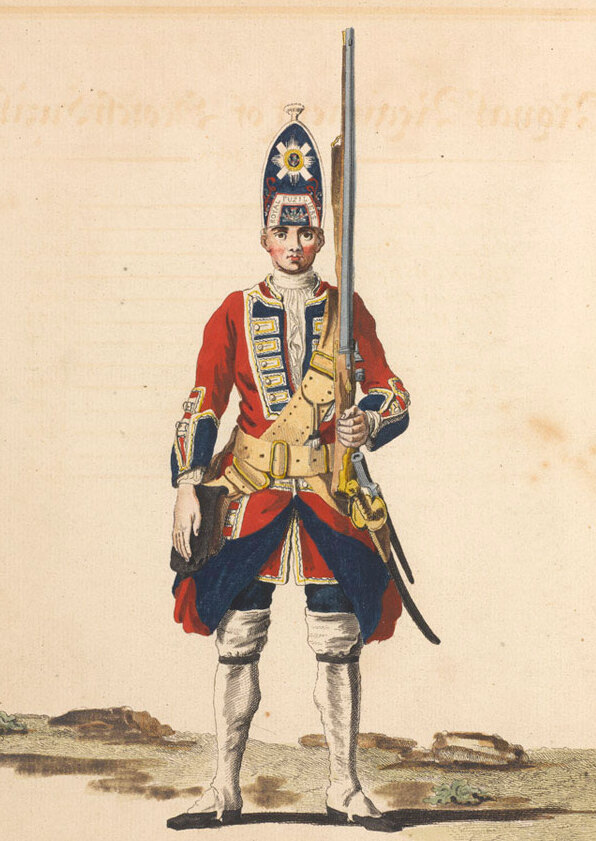
c. 1742 engraving of a regimental private

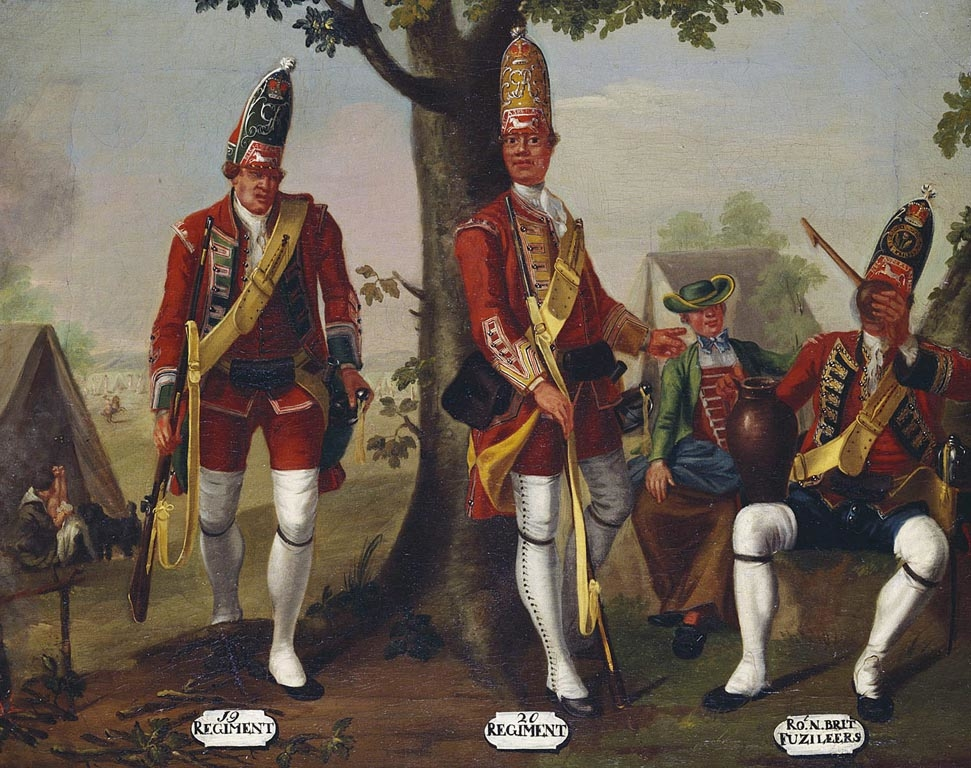
c. 1751 painting of a regimental grenadier (right)

The regiment was awarded the title "Royal" around 1713, returning to England in August 1714 on the death of Queen Anne who was succeeded by George I. During the Jacobite Rising in 1715, it fought at Sheriffmuir against forces led by its founder's son, the 6th Earl of Mar. The Rebellion was defeated but in July 1716 Orrery was removed due to his Jacobite sympathies and replaced by George Macartney. Macartney was a Whig loyalist involved in the 1712 Hamilton–Mohun duel who went into exile when charged as an accessory to murder, returning when George I became King.

Britain was at peace during this period and the regiment remained on garrison duty until the War of the Austrian Succession broke out in 1742. It fought at Dettingen in June 1743 and Fontenoy in April 1745, a British defeat famous for the British and French commanders politely inviting each other to fire first. During the 1745 Rising it was part of the force that defeated the Jacobite army at Culloden in April 1746 but was back in Flanders when the Treaty of Aix-la-Chapelle ended the war in 1748.

In 1751, the system whereby regiments were numbered by seniority was formalised and it became the 21st Regiment. The regiment captured Belle Île in 1761 during the 1756–63 Seven Years' War. After the conclusion of the conflict it was deployed to Mobile, British West Florida in c. October 1765; the next 18 years were spent on garrison duty in Gibraltar, Scotland, West Florida and Quebec before returning to England in 1773.

The regiment saw action at the Siege of Fort Ticonderoga in July 1777 during the American Revolutionary War, took part in the Siege of Bergen op Zoom in March 1814 during the Napoleonic Wars and saw combat at the Battle of New Orleans in January 1815 during the War of 1812. The regiment then served under the command of Lieutenant Colonel Frederick Haines at the Battle of Inkerman in November 1854 during the Crimean War.

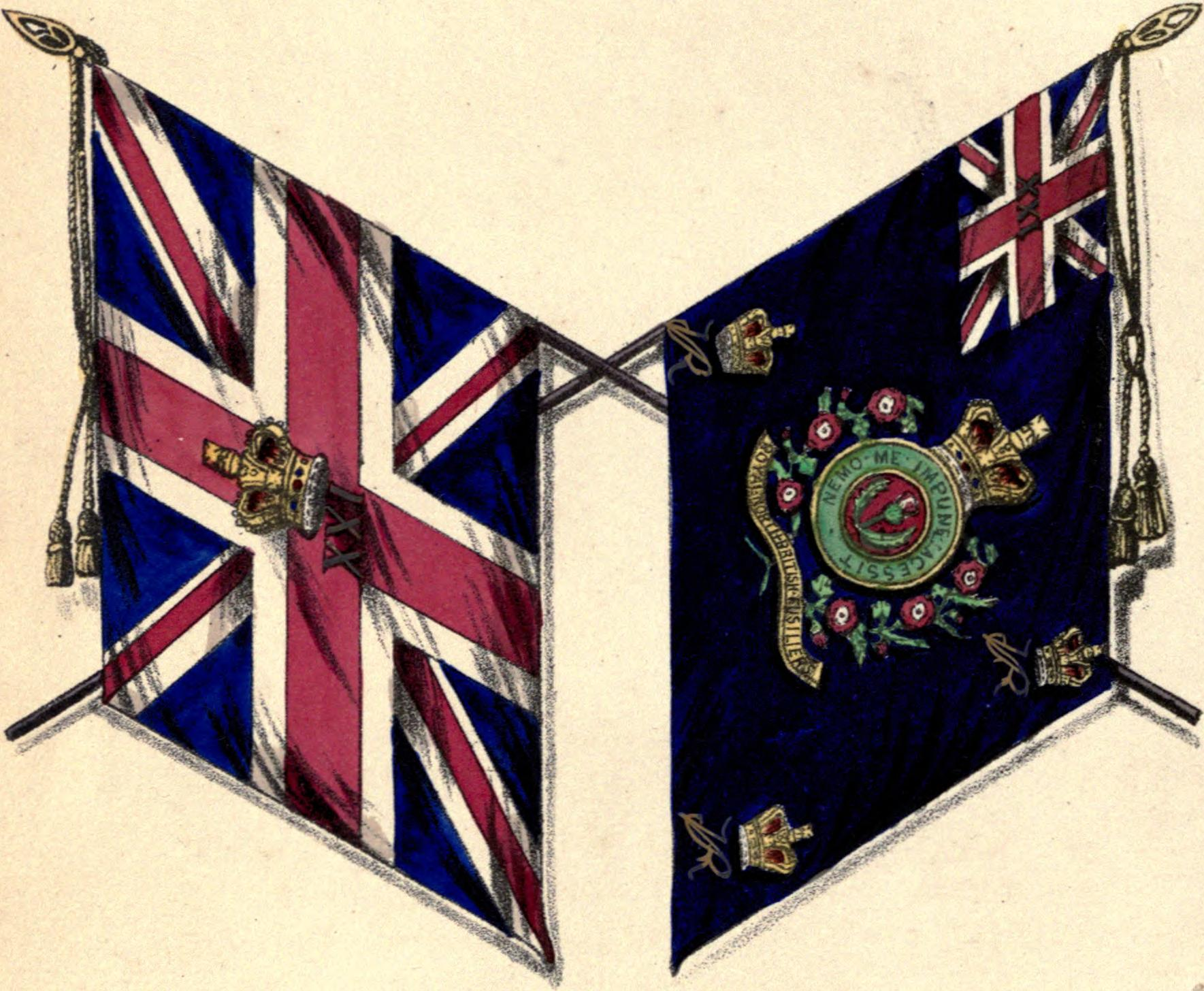
1848 illustration of the regimental colours

A second battalion was raised in 1805 serving initially in Ayr and Greenock, Scotland and then in Ireland for the next three years. In April 1871, the 1st Battalion was in Bangalore. In April 1881, the 1st Battalion was in Secunderabad.

The 2nd Battalion were disembarked at Dún Laoghaire on 22 November 1860. In 1861, the 2nd Battalion was at Birr Barracks. They departed on 11 July 1863, to redeploy to India. In 1871, the battalion was at the Thayet cantonment in Burma. In April 1881, the battalion was in the Transvaal Colony.

=== 21st (Royal Scots Fusiliers) Regiment of Foot (1877–1881) ===
The regiment finally saw the restoration of "Scots" in their title in 1877.

=== Childers Reforms ===
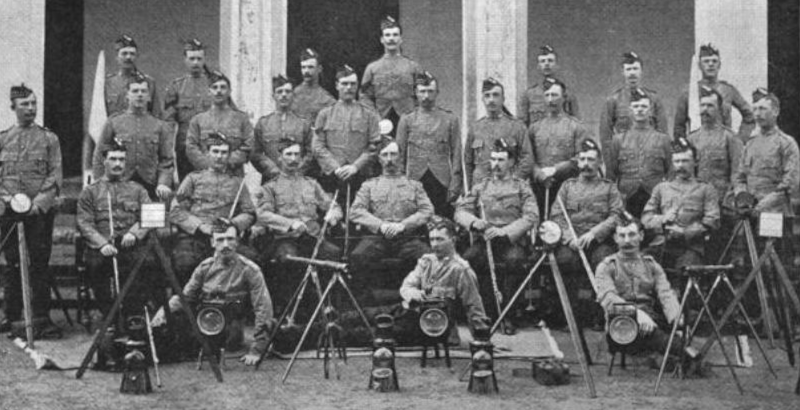
Signalling team of the 2nd Battalion, Royal Scots Fusiliers, January 1895.

The regiment was not fundamentally affected by the Cardwell Reforms of the 1870s, which gave it a depot at Churchill Barracks in Ayr from 1873, or by the Childers Reforms of 1881 – as it already possessed two battalions, there was no need for it to amalgamate with another regiment. Under the reforms the regiment became The Royal Scots Fusiliers on 1 July 1881. It became the County Regiment of Ayrshire, Dumfriesshire, Kirkcudbrightshire, Roxburghshire, Selkirkshire and Wigtownshire in South-West Scotland. This made them a Lowland Regiment and forced them to adopt trews.

In March 1891, the 1st Battalion were stationed at Dublin, and the 2nd Battalion were at Peshawar.

The 2nd battalion of the regiment served in South Africa during the Second Boer War, and saw action at the Battle of the Tugela Heights in February 1900. Captain Hugh Trenchard was seriously wounded while serving with the regiment near Krugersdorp at this time. The battalion stayed in South Africa after the end of the war (June 1902), leaving Cape Town for Southampton on the SS Staffordshire in January 1903.

In 1908, the Volunteers and Militia were reorganised nationally, with the former becoming the Territorial Force and the latter the Special Reserve; the regiment now had one Reserve and two Territorial battalions.

=== First World War ===
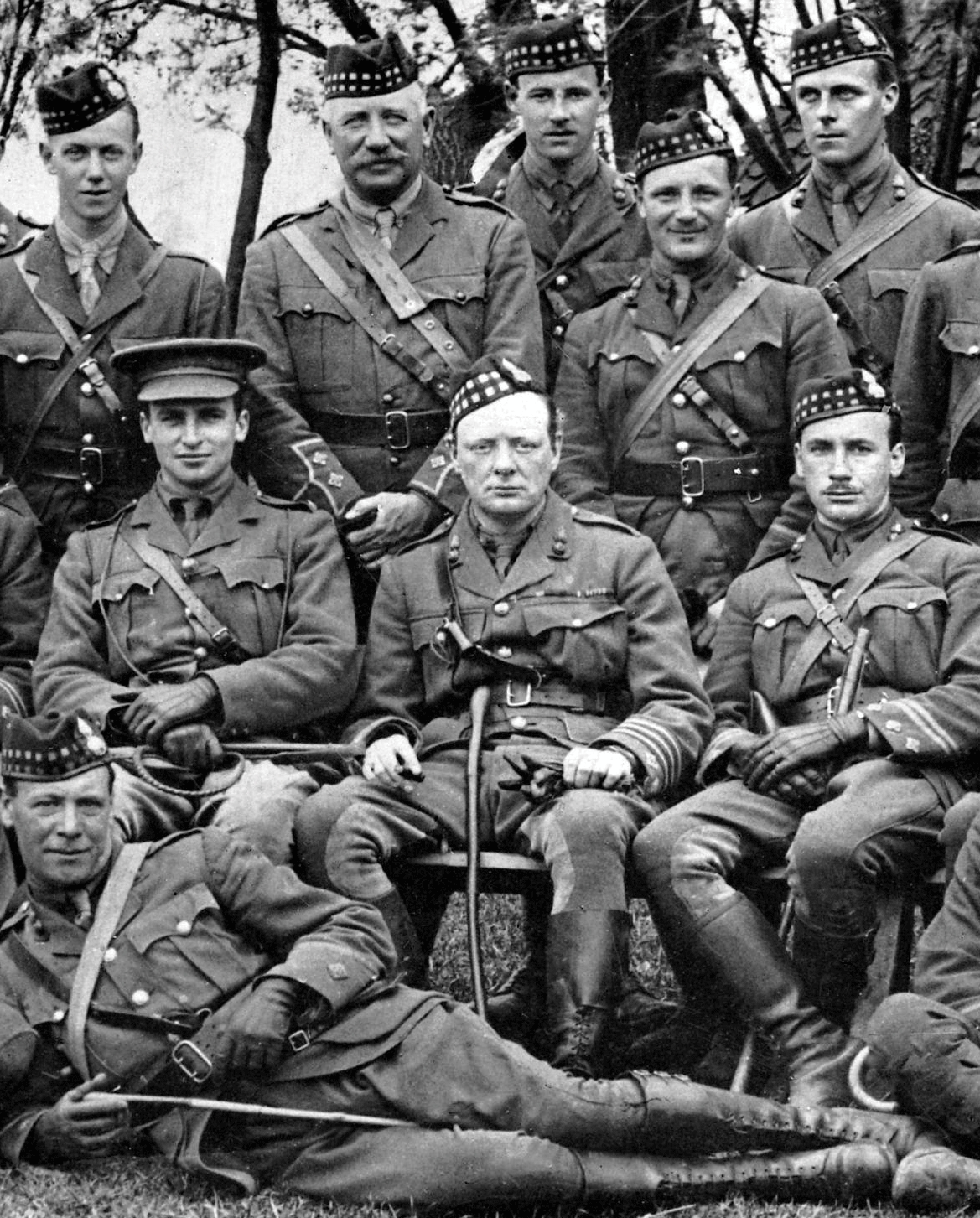
Regimental officers in 1916

The 1st Battalion landed at Le Havre as part of 9th Brigade in the 3rd Division in August 1914 for service on the Western Front. It saw action at the Battle of Mons in August 1914, the First Battle of Ypres in October 1914, Battle of the Somme in Summer 1916, the Battle of Arras in April 1917 and the advance to the Hindenburg Line in September 1918 and was commanded by Lieutenant Colonel Deneys Reitz in the closing stages of the war.

The 2nd Battalion landed at Zeebrugge as part of the 21st Brigade in the 7th Division in October 1914 for service on the Western Front. It saw action at the First Battle of Ypres in October 1914, the Battle of Neuve Chapelle in March 1915, the Battle of Loos in October 1915, the Battle of the Somme in Summer 1916, the Battle of Arras in April 1917 and the Battle of Lys in April 1918.

The 1/4th and 1/5th Battalions landed in Gallipoli as part of the 155th Brigade in the 52nd (Lowland) Division in June 1915; after being evacuated in January 1916 they moved to France in April 1918 for service on the Western Front.

The 6th (Service) Battalion landed at Boulogne-sur-Mer as part of the 27th Brigade in the 9th (Scottish) Division in May 1915 for service on the Western Front. Lieutenant Colonel Winston Churchill commanded the battalion when it was located near Ploegsteert Wood during Spring 1916. The 7th (Service) Battalion landed at Boulogne-sur-Mer as part of the 45th Brigade in the 15th (Scottish) Division in July 1915 for service on the Western Front. The 8th (Service) Battalion landed at Boulogne-sur-Mer as part of the 77th Brigade in the 26th Division in September 1915 for service on the Western Front but soon moved to Salonika.

=== Second World War ===
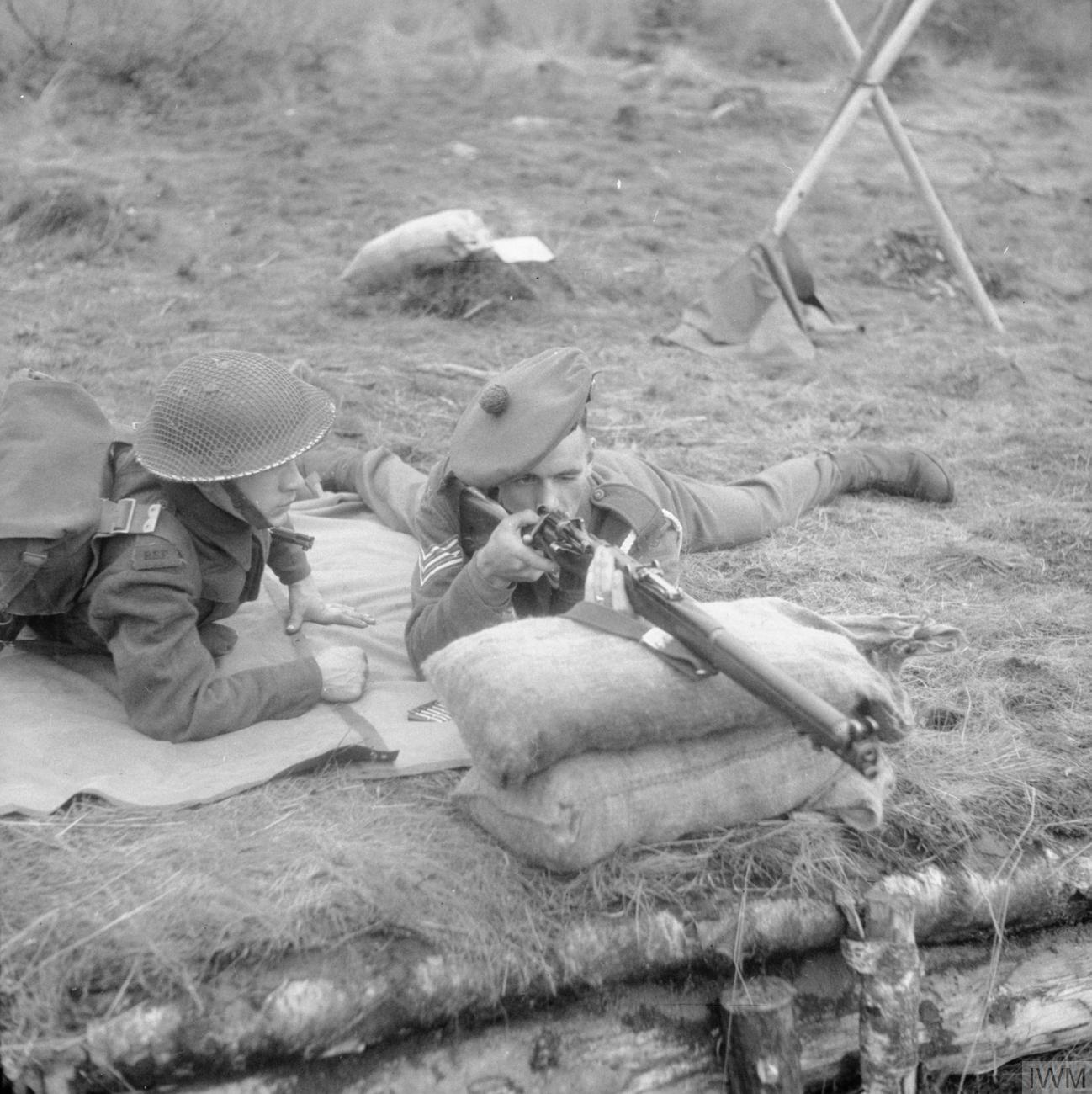
A regimental sergeant instructor training a recruit on how to fire a Lee–Enfield in prone position, 31 August 1942

The 1st Battalion spent the whole war as part of the 29th Independent Infantry Brigade Group. The battalion participated in the Battle of Madagascar in 1942 as did the 2nd Battalion, a unique achievement for the regiment to have both its regular battalions involved in the same action. They were then transferred to India to fight in the South-East Asian Theatre. In 1944 the 29th Brigade became part of the 36th Infantry Division, previously a British Indian Army formation and one of two British divisions fighting the Japanese. The 36th Division spent the rest of the war under command of the British Fourteenth Army.

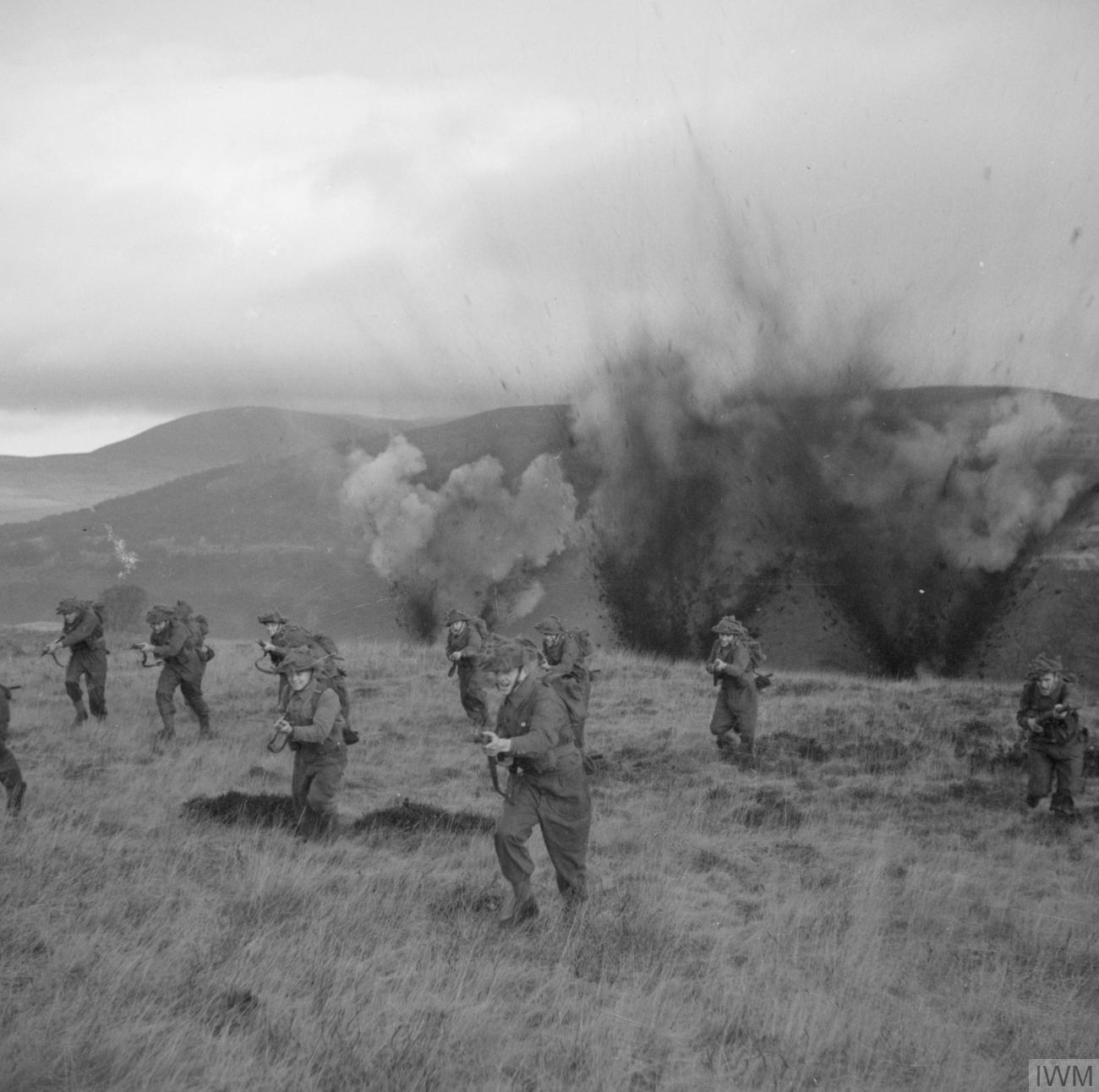
Regimental troops performing a bayonet charge through artillery fire during a training exercise in Scotland, 20 December 1943

The 2nd Battalion, Royal Scots Fusiliers was based in Redford Barracks in Edinburgh on the outbreak of war commanded by Lieutenant Colonel Walter Clutterbuck. In September 1939, the battalion was grouped with the 2nd Bn Seaforth Highlanders and the 2nd Bn Northamptonshire Regiment to form 17 Infantry Brigade, which was assigned to the 5th Infantry Division. They were sent as an independent brigade to France in October 1939 to join the British Expeditionary Force (BEF). The battalion acted in support during the Battle of Arras and was significantly involved in the subsequent Battle of the Ypres-Comines Canal. The battalion suffered significant casualties and prisoners of war, and only 40 personnel were able to make it as a formed unit to Dunkirk to be evacuated to England. After 2 years spent on home defence in the United Kingdom, the battalion and brigade were detached from the 5th Division, and like the 1st Battalion, fought in Madagascar. The battalion next saw service fighting in Sicily. In 1944 the division fought in the Battle of Anzio in some of the fiercest fighting of the Italian Campaign thus far. The Anzio landings were an attempt to outflank the German Gustav Line, one of many defensive lines the Germans had created across Italy. After the fierce fighting there, the 2nd RSF and the rest of 5th Division were withdrawn, in July 1944, to Palestine to rest and refit. They returned to Italy briefly in early 1945 but were transferred, along with I Canadian Corps from British Eighth Army, to Belgium to join the 21st Army Group in the Allied invasion of Germany.

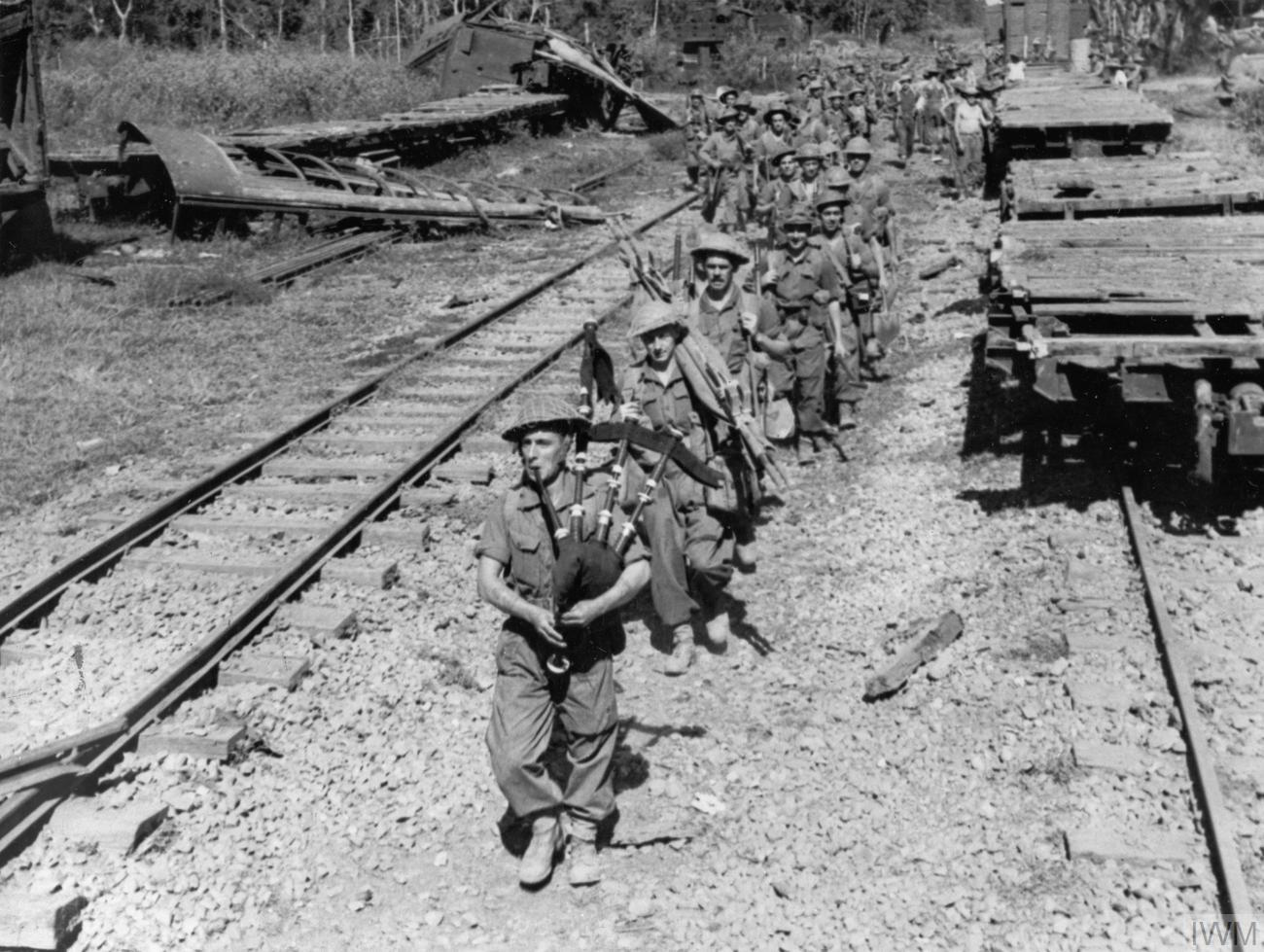
Regimental troops in Burma, 1944

The 4/5th and 6th battalions both saw service in the European Campaign in 1944–45 with the 6th also serving in France in 1940, assigned to 51st (Highland) Infantry Division and part of the BEF. The 4/5th Battalion was the TA 4th and 5th battalions merged and became part of 156th Infantry Brigade assigned to the 52nd (Lowland) Infantry Division. Lieutenant Colonel Thomas Corbett commanded the 6th Battalion during the Battle of France in June 1940. The 6th Battalion was reassigned to the 46th Infantry Brigade part of 15th (Scottish) Infantry Division, the 2nd Line duplicate of the 52nd, and served with them during the Battle of Normandy.

The 50th (Holding) Battalion was raised in late May 1940 and was later redesignated the 11th Battalion in October and was assigned to the 222nd Infantry Brigade, where it remained until September 1942 when it transferred to the 147th Infantry Brigade, alongside the 1/6th and 1/7th Duke of Wellington's Regiment, part of the 49th (West Riding) Infantry Division, where it was to remain for the rest of the war.

=== Amalgamations of 1959 ===
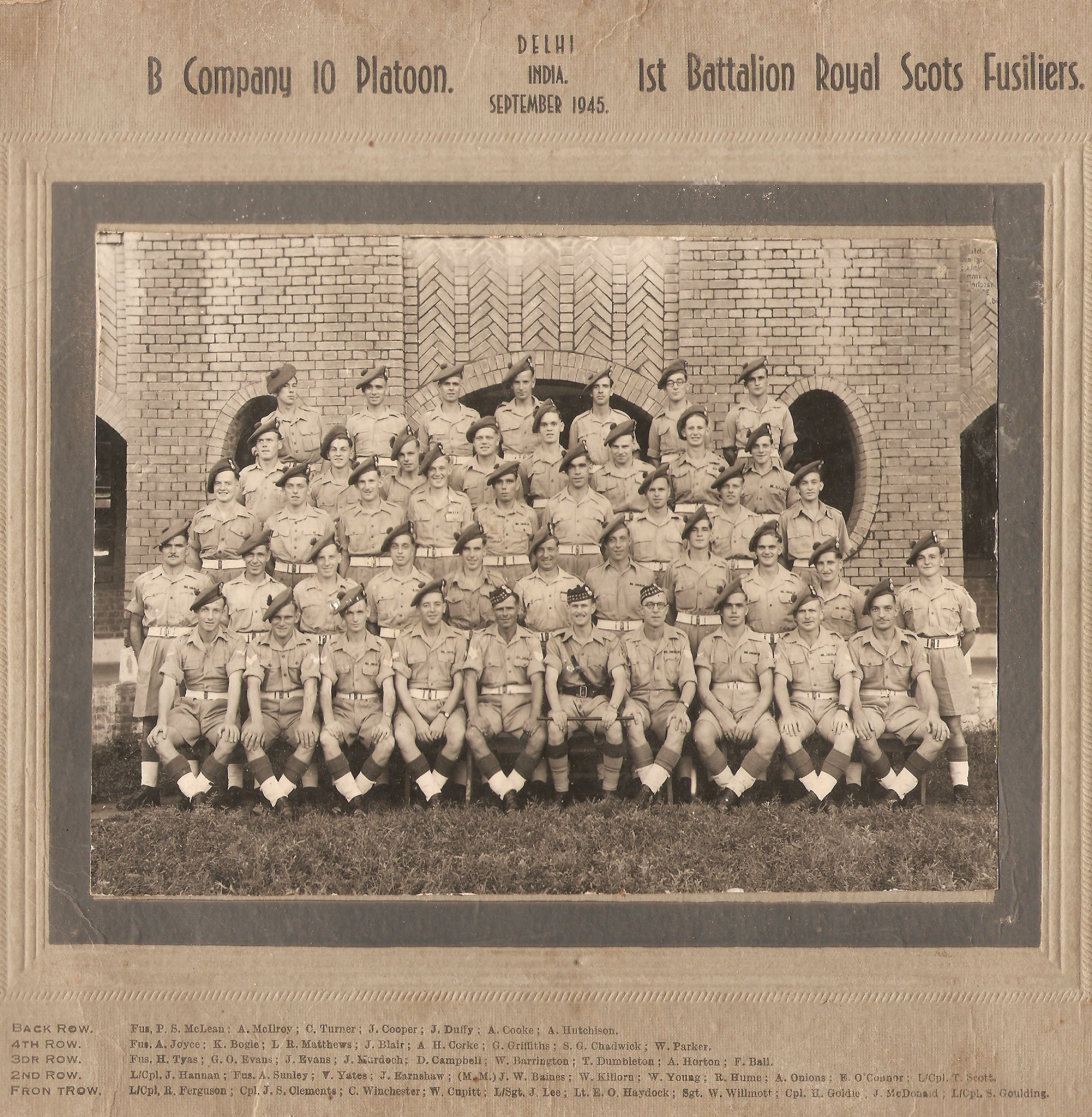
Men of B Company, 10 Platoon, 1st Battalion, Royal Scots Fusiliers, in Delhi, India, September 1945.

The Royal Scots Fusiliers were amalgamated with the Highland Light Infantry (City of Glasgow Regiment) in 1959 to form the Royal Highland Fusiliers, (Princess Margaret's Own Glasgow and Ayrshire Regiment). The Regular 1st battalions of the two regiments combined at Redford Barracks, Edinburgh, to form the 1st Battalion of the new regiment (1 RHF).

== Battle honours ==
The Regiment was awarded the following battle honours. Those shown in bold from the two World Wars were those selected to be emblazoned on the King's Colour.

- Blenheim, Ramillies, Oudenarde, Malplaquet, Dettingen, Bellisle, Martinique 1794, Bladensburg, Alma, Inkerman, Sevastopol, South Africa 1879, Burma 1885–87, Tirah, Relief of Ladysmith, South Africa 1899–1902
- The Great War (18 battalions): **Mons**, Le Cateau, Retreat from Mons, **Marne 1914**, Aisne 1914, La Bassée 1914, **Ypres 1914 '17 '18**, Langemarck 1914, Gheluvelt, Nonne Bosschen, Neuve Chapelle, Aubers, Festubert 1915, Loos, **Somme 1916 '18**, Albert 1916 '18, Bazentin, Delville Wood, Pozières, Flers-Courcelette, Le Transloy, Ancre Heights, Ancre 1916, **Arras 1917 '18**, Scarpe 1917 '18, Arleux, Messines 1917, Pilckem, Menin Road, Polygon Wood, St Quentin, Bapaume 1918, Rosières, **Lys**, Estaires, Hazebrouck, Bailleul, Béthune, Scherpenberg, Drocourt-Quéant, **Hindenberg Line**, Canal du Nord, Courtrai, Selle, France and Flanders 1914–18, **Doiran 1917 '18**, Macedonia 1916–18, Helles, **Gallipoli 1915–16**, Rumani, Egypt 1916–17, Gaza, El Mughar, Nebi Samwil, Jerusalem, Jaffa, Tel Asur, **Palestine 1917–18**
- The Second World War: Defence of Arras, **Ypres-Comines Canal**, Somme 1940, Withdrawal to Seine, **Odon**, Fontenay le Pesnil, Cheux, Defence of Rauray, Mont Pincon, Estry, **Falaise**, Le Vie Crossing, La Touques Crossing, Aart, Nederrijn, Best, Le Havre, Antwerp-Turnhout Canal, **Scheldt**, South Beveland, Lower Maas, Meijel, Venlo Pocket, Roer, Rhineland, Reichswald, Cleve, Goch, **Rhine**, Dreirwalde, Uelzen, **Bremen**, Artlenberg, North-West Europe 1940 '44–45, **Landing in Sicily**, Sicily 1943, Sangro, **Garigliano Crossing**, Minturno, Anzio, Advance to Tiber, Italy 1943–44, Madagascar, Middle East 1942, **North Arakan**, Razabil, **Pinwe**, Shweli, Mandalay, Burma 1944–45
- 4th Battalion: South Africa 1900–02
- 5th Battalion: South Africa 1900–01

== Victoria Crosses ==
Victoria Crosses awarded to members of the regiment were:

- Second Lieutenant Stanley Henry Parry Boughey, First World War (1 December 1917)
- Sergeant Thomas Caldwell, First World War (31 October 1918)
- Second Lieutenant John Manson Craig, First World War (5 June 1917)
- Fusilier Dennis Donnini, Second World War (18 January 1945)
- Private David Ross Lauder, First World War (13 August 1915)
- Private George Ravenhill, Second Boer War (15 December 1899)

== Colonels of the Regiment ==
Colonels of the regiment were:

- 1678–1686: Col. Charles Erskine, 5th Earl of Mar; resigned June 1686;
- 1686–1689: Col. Thomas Buchan; removed for refusing to swear allegiance to William III, March 1689;

=== 21st Regiment of Foot ===
- 1689–1695: Brig-Gen. Francis Fergus O'Farrell; cashiered September 1695 for the surrender of Deinze (later reinstated);
- 1695–1697: Col. Hon. Robert Mackay; died of disease December 1696;
- 1697–1704: Col. Archibald Row; killed at Blenheim May 1704;
- 1704–1706: Brig-Gen. John Mordaunt, Viscount Mordaunt; transferred to 28th Foot June 1706;
- 1706–1709: Maj-Gen. Sampson de Lalo; killed at Malplaquet September 1709.

=== The North British Fusiliers ===
- 1709-1710: Brig-Gen. John Mordaunt, Viscount Mordaunt; reappointed September 1709, died of smallpox April 1710;
- 1710: Lt-Gen. Thomas Meredyth; removed for political opposition to the Harley Tory government December 1710;
- 1710-1716: Maj-Gen. Charles Boyle, 4th Earl of Orrery; removed for political opposition to the Whigs July 1716;

=== The Royal North British Fusiliers ===
- 1716–1727: Lt-Gen. George MacCartney
- 1727–1738: Maj-Gen. Sir James Wood, 2nd Baronet
- 1738–1752: Gen. John Campbell, 4th Duke of Argyll, KT

=== 21st (Royal North British) Fusiliers ===
- 1752–1770: Gen. William Maule, 1st Earl of Panmure
- 1770–1789: Lt-Gen. Hon. Alexander Mackay
- 1789–1794: Gen. Hon. James Murray
- 1794–1803: Gen. James Inglis Hamilton
- 1803–1816: Gen. Hon. William Gordon of Fyvie
- 1816–1843: Gen. James Ochoncar Forbes, 17th Baron Forbes
- 1843–1853: Gen. Sir Frederick Adam, GCB, GCMG
- 1853–1870: Gen. Sir George de Lacey Evans, GCB
- 1870–1890: Gen. Sir Frederick William Hamilton. KCB

=== The Royal Scots Fusiliers ===
- 1890–1909: F.M. Sir Frederick Paul Haines, GCB, GCSI, CIE
- 1909–1919: Lt-Gen. John Thomas Dalyell
- 1919–1946: Marshal of the RAF (Col.) Hugh Montague Trenchard, 1st Viscount Trenchard, GCB
- 1946–1957: Maj-Gen. Sir Edmund Hakewill Smith, KCVO, CB, CBE, MC
- 1957–1959: Brig. Archibald Ian Buchanan-Dunlop, CBE, DSO

== See also ==
- 21st Royal Scots Fusiliers F.C.

== Sources ==
- Buchan, John (2005) [1925]. The History of the Royal Scots Fusiliers. The Naval & Military Press.
- Cannon, Richard (1849). Historical Record of the Twenty-First or Royal North British Fusilier Regiment of Foot. ISBN 9780665483387.
- Chandler, David; Beckett, Ian (1996). The Oxford History Of The British Army (2002 ed.). Oxford University Press. ISBN 0-19-280311-5.
- Childs, John (1987). The British Army of William III, 1689-1702 (1990 ed.). Manchester University Press. ISBN 0719025524.
- Childs, John (1991). The Nine Years' War and the British Army, 1688-97. Manchester University Press. ISBN 978-0719089961.
- Churchill, Winston (2003). Marlborough: His Life and Times. University of Chicago Press. ISBN 978-0226106335.
- Heathcote, Tony (1999). The British Field Marshals, 1736–1997: A Biographical Dictionary. Barnsley: Leo Cooper. ISBN 0-85052-696-5.
- Jenkins, Roy (2001). Churchill: A Biography. Farrar, Straus and Giroux. ISBN 978-0-374-12354-3.
- Joslen, H.F. (1960). Orders of Battle, Volume 1: United Kingdom and Colonial Formations and Units in the Second World War 1939–1945. London: HMSO.
- Lynn, John (1999). The Wars of Louis XIV, 1667-1714 (Modern Wars In Perspective). Longman. ISBN 0582056292.
- Reitz, Deneys; JC Smuts (2008). Commando: A Boer Journal of the Boer War. CruGuru. ISBN 978-1-920265-68-7.
- Rowallan, Lord (1976). Rowallan: the autobiography of Lord Rowallan. Paul Harris Publishing. ISBN 0-919670-12-1.
- Walton, Clifford (1894). History of the British Standing Army; 1660 to 1700 (2012 ed.). Nabu Press. p. 304. ISBN 1149754761.
