= Alfred Rose (cricketer) =

English cricketer

Alfred Rose (15 February 1894 — 21 June 1985) was an English cricketer who played for Derbyshire in 1924.

Rose was born in Glossop, Derbyshire. In the 1924 season he made a single first-class appearance for Derbyshire in May against Lancashire. Like eight others in the innings, he was a victim of the bowling of Cec Parkin and made a duck in his only innings batting in the middle order. When he was asked later in the summer to play again, he replied that he was too old for that class of cricket.

Rose died in Kilton, Nottinghamshire at the age of 91.
