= Colin Leech =

English cricketer (1889–1961)

Colin Leech (30 August 1889 – 6 March 1961) was an English cricketer who played for Derbyshire in 1922.

Leech was born in Hayfield, Derbyshire, and made his first appearance for Hayfield Cricket Club in 1905 at the age of sixteen and rapidly became one of its most highly regarded players. He made a single first-class appearance for Derbyshire in the 1922 season, against Glamorgan. He was a right-handed batsman and batting as an opener, scored 12 runs in the first innings of the match and 26 runs in the second innings, partnering Joseph Bowden.

Leech died in Frome at the age of 72.
