= John Heath (cricketer, born 1891) =

English cricketer (1891–1972)

Personal information
- Full name: John Stanley Heath
- Born: 30 August 1891; Swadlincote, Derbyshire, England
- Died: 1 September 1972 (aged 81); Trentham, Staffordshire, England
- Batting: Right-handed
- Bowling: Leg-break
- Relatives: Frederick Heath

Domestic team information
- Years: Team
- 1924–1925: Derbyshire
- FC debut: 9 September 1918 Europeans v Hindus
- Last FC: 4 July 1925 Derbyshire v Leicestershire

Career statistics
Competition	First-class
Matches	11
Runs scored	214
Batting average	12.58
100s/50s	0/0
Top score	34
Balls bowled	1,174
Wickets	30
Bowling average	27.73
5 wickets in innings	3
10 wickets in match	0
Best bowling	5/33
Catches/stumpings	8/–
- Source: CricketArchive, February 2012

John Stanley Heath (30 August 1891 – 1 September 1972) was an English cricketer who played first-class cricket for Europeans in India in 1918/19 and for Derbyshire in 1924 and 1925.

Heath was born at Swadlincote, Derbyshire. He played minor counties cricket for Staffordshire from 1911 to 1914. He made his first-class debut in 1918 playing for Europeans in the Bombay Quadrangular tournament in India when he achieved his best bowling performance of 5 for 33 against Hindus and also 5 for 40 against Parsees. In 1920 he was back with Staffordshire, for whom he played until he joined Derbyshire in 1924. He also played two games for H. D. G. Leveson Gower's XI in 1921. He made his Derbyshire debut in the 1924 season in July against Yorkshire, and played three more matches for the club that season when he achieved 5 for 54 against Nottinghamshire. He played one match for Derbyshire in the 1925 season and then resumed his games for Staffordshire until 1935.

Heath was a right-hand batsman and played nineteen innings in eleven first-class matches with an average of 12.58 and a top score of 34. He was a leg-break bowler and took 30 first-class wickets with an average of 27.73 and a best performance of 5 for 33.

Heath died at Trentham, Staffordshire, at the age of 81. His brother Frederick Heath also played for Derbyshire.
