= Peter Hill-Wood =

British businessman (1936–2018)

Peter Denis Hill-Wood (25 February 1936 – 27 December 2018) was a British businessman and a chairman of Arsenal Football Club.

== Biography ==
Hill-Wood was born in Kensington, London, son of Denis Hill-Wood and his wife Mary Smith. His father, three uncles and grandfather all played first-class cricket for Derbyshire County Cricket Club.

Peter Hill-Wood attended Ludgrove School and Eton College, where he was a classmate of former Arsenal director Sir Roger Gibbs. He then served in the Coldstream Guards. After leaving the Guards, Hill-Wood entered the banking industry, eventually rising to become a vice-chairman of Hambros Bank, having previously been in charge of its investment division.

After Hill-Wood retired from his post at Hambros, he was a director of Cavenham Ltd and Hellenic and General Trust.

=== Arsenal chairmanship ===
He was the third generation of his family to serve as chairman of Arsenal, following his father, Denis Hill-Wood (in office 1962–1982), and his grandfather, Samuel Hill-Wood (1929–1936 and 1946–1949) from Glossop, Derbyshire. Hill-Wood joined the Arsenal board in October 1962. Peter succeeded his father after the latter's death in 1982. He was not in charge of any day-to-day business at the club, which was generally run by David Dein and a succession of first team managers.

Hill-Wood was a colleague of Chips Keswick – a former Bank of England director – at Hambros and subsequently saw him recruited to the Arsenal board to provide strong City of London contacts at a time when the club were financing their new stadium.

Hill-Wood sold much of his family holdings in the club to former vice-chairman David Dein in the 1980s and 1990s and the rest to Stan Kroenke.

On 14 June 2013 Hill-Wood stepped down and was replaced as chairman by Keswick.

=== Other ===
- He played first-class cricket for the Free Foresters Cricket Club in 1960.
- He and Chips Keswick were both members of Business for Sterling.

== Personal life ==
He married Sally Andrews in 1971 and had three children.

=== Health ===
On 2 December 2012, Arsenal announced Hill-Wood had suffered a heart attack and was recovering in hospital.

=== Death ===
Peter Hill-Wood died late in the evening of 27 December 2018, aged 82.
