= Archibald Ackroyd =

English cricketer (1897–1968)

Personal information
- Full name: Archibald Ackroyd
- Born: 18 May 1897; Heanor, Derbyshire, England
- Died: 25 June 1968 (aged 71); Dudley, England
- Batting: Right-handed
- Bowling: Right-arm medium-fast

Domestic team information
- Years: Team
- 1924–1925: Derbyshire
- FC debut: 25 June 1924 Derbyshire v Northamptonshire
- Last FC: 11 August 1937 Scotland v Yorkshire

Career statistics
Competition	First-class
Matches	12
Runs scored	79
Batting average	4.15
100s/50s	0/0
Top score	15
Balls bowled	1,582
Wickets	20
Bowling average	35.35
5 wickets in innings	0
10 wickets in match	0
Best bowling	4/63
Catches/stumpings	5/–
- Source: CricketArchive, February 2012

Archibald Ackroyd (18 May 1897 – 25 June 1968) was an English cricketer who played for Derbyshire in 1924 and 1925 and for Scotland in 1937.

Ackroyd was born in Heanor, Derbyshire. He made his debut for Derbyshire in the 1924 season. In his opening match against Northamptonshire he took three wickets and a catch and scored 13 in his second innings. He played three more matches for the county that season and seven games in the 1925 season.

Ackroyd subsequently moved to Scotland where he played for West of Scotland against the Australians in 1926 and for another Scotland team against the Australians in 1930. He represented Scotland in one first-class match against Yorkshire in 1937.

Ackroyd was a right-arm medium-fast bowler and took 20 first-class wickets with an average of 35.35 and a best performance of 4 for 63. He was a right-handed batsman and played 20 innings in twelve first-class matches with an average of 4.15 and a top score of 15.

Ackroyd died in Dixon's Green, Dudley at the age of 71.
