= Basil Hill-Wood =

English cricketer, solicitor, and baronet

Personal information
- Full name: Sir Basil Samuel Hill-Wood, 2nd Baronet
- Born: 5 February 1900; Chelsea, London, England
- Died: 3 July 1954 (aged 54); Farley Hill, Berkshire, England
- Batting: Right-handed
- Bowling: Right-arm fast-medium
- Relatives: Samuel Hill-Wood (father); Wilfred Hill-Wood (brother); Denis Hill-Wood (brother); Charles Hill-Wood (brother)

Domestic team information
- Years: Team
- 1919–1925: Derbyshire
- FC debut: 8 August 1919 Derbyshire v Northamptonshire
- Last FC: 22 July 1925 Derbyshire v Gloucestershire

Career statistics
Competition	First-class
Matches	22
Runs scored	505
Batting average	16.29
100s/50s	0/1
Top score	61
Balls bowled	2,565
Wickets	45
Bowling average	31.24
5 wickets in innings	1
10 wickets in match	0
Best bowling	6/74
Catches/stumpings	7/–
- Source: CricketArchive, December 2011

Sir Basil Samuel Hill Hill-Wood, 2nd Baronet (5 February 1900 – 3 July 1954) was an English solicitor, baronet and cricketer who played first-class cricket for Derbyshire between 1919 and 1925.

Hill-Wood was born at Chelsea, London, the eldest son of Sir Samuel Hill-Wood, 1st Baronet and his wife Hon Rachel Bateman-Hanbury. His father was Member of Parliament and had also played cricket for Derbyshire. He was educated at Eton and became a solicitor.

Hill-Wood made his debut for Derbyshire in the 1919 season when he took 4 wickets and scored 24 in a single innings against Northamptonshire. He played two more games in 1919 and next played two games for Derbyshire in the 1921 season. He took part in a Marylebone Cricket Club (MCC) tour of New Zealand in 1922/23 and was a regular in the Derbyshire side in the 1923 season. He played again for Derbyshire in the 1925 season in which year he also played club and old school games. Hill-Wood was a right hand batsman and played 35 innings for Derbyshire in 22 matches. His top score was 61 and his average 16.29. He was a right arm fast medium bowler and took 45 wickets at an average 31.24. His best match count was 6 for 74.

Hill-Wood inherited the baronetcy on the death of his father in 1949. He died at Farley Hill, Berkshire at the age of 54.

Hill-Wood married Joan Louisa Brand, daughter of Thomas Walter Brand, 3rd Viscount Hampden and Lady Katharine Mary Montagu Douglas Scott, on 18 February 1925. They had a daughter and a son David who inherited the baronetcy. As well as his father, Hill Wood's brothers Wilfred Hill-Wood, Denis Hill-Wood and Charles Hill-Wood played cricket for Derbyshire.

Baronetage of the United Kingdom
Preceded by Samuel Hill-Wood	Baronet (of Moorfield); 1949–1954	Succeeded by David Hill-Wood
