= Churchill Barracks =

Military installation in Ayr, Scotland

- Ayr
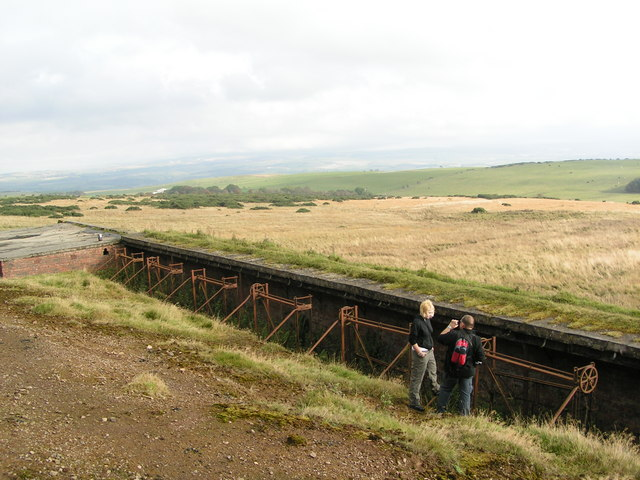
- Disused shooting range south-west of Ayr, which formed part of the facilities associated with Churchill Barracks

Site information
- Type: Barracks
- Owner: Ministry of Defence
- Operator: British Army

Location
- Location within South Ayrshire
- Coordinates: 55.46621°N 4.63788°W

Site history
- Built: 1795
- Built for: War Office
- In use: 1795–1959

Garrison information
- Occupants: Royal Scots Fusiliers

Churchill Barracks was a military installation in Ayr, Scotland.

== History ==
The barracks were built on the south side of Ayr Harbour as part of the British response to the threat of the French Revolution in 1795. In 1873 a system of recruiting areas based on counties was instituted under the Cardwell Reforms and the barracks became the depot for the two battalions of the 21st (Royal Scots Fusiliers) Regiment of Foot. Following the Childers Reforms, the regiment evolved to become the Royal Scots Fusiliers with its depot in the barracks in 1881.

The barracks were renamed Churchill Barracks in honour of Winston Churchill, a former Commanding Officer of a battalion of the Regiment, in 1942 during the Second World War. The regiment amalgamated with the Highland Light Infantry to form the Royal Highland Fusiliers at Redford Barracks in Edinburgh in 1959. The buildings were demolished in 1967 and the site was converted for use as The Citadel Leisure Centre.
