= Wood baronets of Bonnytown (1666) =

Escutcheon of the Wood baronets of Bonnytown

The Wood baronetcy, of Bonnytown (Bonyngtoun, Bonnyton) in the County of Forfar, was created in the Baronetage of Nova Scotia on 11 May 1666 for John Wood. The title became extinct on the death of the second Baronet in 1738. It was them assumed by James Allardyce-Wood.

== Wood baronets, of Bonnytown (1666) ==
- Sir John Wood, 1st Baronet (c. 1638–1693)
- Sir James Wood, 2nd Baronet (died 1738)
