= Sir James Wood, 2nd Baronet =

British Army general

Sir James Wood, 2nd Baronet (died 1738) was a Scottish officer of the Dutch States Army and later the British Army.

He was the son of Sir John Wood, 1st Baronet, of Bonyngtoun in Forfarshire, by his wife Anne, daughter of James Ogilvy, 2nd Earl of Airlie. He was commissioned into the army of the States-General of the Netherlands on 31 December 1688, and served for many years, including as Governor of Dendermonde and later as a major in Strathnaver's regiment. He reached the rank of brigadier general in 1704.

In recognition of his Dutch military reputation Wood was also made brigadier general in the British service, and on 9 March 1727 was appointed colonel of the Royal North British Fusiliers. He was promoted to major general on 27 October 1735.

Wood succeeded to the baronetcy in January 1693 and was served heir to his father 10 August 1704. On 22 February 1731 he married Anne, daughter of Edward Jones, the Master of the Royal Vineyard in St James's Park. They had no sons, so on Wood's death (variously given as 23 February, 3 May and 18 May 1738) the baronetcy became extinct.

Military offices
Preceded by George MacCartney	Colonel of the Royal North British Fusiliers; 1727–1738	Succeeded by John Campbell
Baronetage of Nova Scotia
Preceded by John Wood	Baronet (of Bonnytown); 1693–1738	Extinct
