= George Godwin (disambiguation) =

George Godwin (1813–1888) was an architect.

George Godwin may also refer to:

- George Nelson Godwin (1846–1907), English cleric and antiquarian
- George Stanley Godwin (1889–1974), author
- K. George Godwin, editor of The Gypsies of Svinia

== See also ==
- George Goodwin (disambiguation)
