= Charles Hill-Wood =

English cricketer

Personal information
- Full name: Charles Kerrison Hill Hill-Wood
- Born: 5 June 1907; Hoxne, Suffolk, England
- Died: 21 September 1988 (aged 81); Barton-le-Clay, Bedfordshire, England
- Batting: Right-handed
- Bowling: Left-arm fast-medium
- Role: Bowler
- Relatives: Samuel Hill-Wood (father); Basil Hill-Wood (brother); Wilfred Hill-Wood (brother); Denis Hill-Wood (brother)

Domestic team information
- Years: Team
- 1928–1930: Oxford University
- 1928–1930: Derbyshire
- 1931–1932: Free Foresters
- FC debut: 2 May 1928 Oxford University v Lancashire
- Last FC: 16 November 1935 Europeans v Muslims

Career statistics
Competition	First-class
Matches	58
Runs scored	1,256
Batting average	19.62
100s/50s	0/5
Top score	72
Balls bowled	12,190
Wickets	185
Bowling average	29.98
5 wickets in innings	10
10 wickets in match	1
Best bowling	7/68
Catches/stumpings	20/–
- Source: CricketArchive, February 2012

Charles Kerrison Hill Hill-Wood (5 June 1907 – 21 September 1988) was an English cricketer who played first-class cricket for Oxford University from 1928 to 1930 and for Derbyshire from 1928 to 1930.

Hill-Wood was born at Hoxne, Suffolk, the fourth son of Sir Samuel Hill-Wood, 1st Baronet, a Member of Parliament who had also played cricket for Derbyshire. He was educated at Ludgrove and Eton, where he played cricket for the Eton XI in 1925 and 1926. He then went to Christ Church, Oxford. As well as his father, Hill-Wood's brothers Basil Hill-Wood, Wilfred Hill-Wood, and Denis Hill-Wood played cricket for Derbyshire.

Hill-Wood played for Oxford University in 1928 and also made his debut for Derbyshire in 1928 against Kent, when he took five wickets and score of 18 not out in a drawn match. In 1929 and 1930 he played regularly for both Oxford University and Derbyshire as well as taking part in Hubert Martineau's XI in Egypt. He played for Free Foresters in 1931 and 1932. By 1935 he was in India where he played one match for the Europeans against Muslims.

Hill-Wood was a left arm medium fast bowler and took 34 wickets for Derbyshire and 132 for Oxford University with averages respectively of 35.47 and 30.23 and a best overall bowling performance at Oxford of 7 for 68. He was a right hand batsman and played 22 innings in 18 matches for Derbyshire and 50 innings in 36 matches for Oxford University. His highest score was 72 and his averages for the two teams were 19.94 and 20.26.

At the outbreak of World War II Hill-Wood was given an emergency commission as a lieutenant in the Coldstream Guards. He remained in the army and army reserve until 1957 when he relinquished his commission with the rank of major (honorary lieutenant colonel). He died at Barton-le-Clay, Bedfordshire at the age of 81.
