= Edward Bedford =

English cricketer

Edward Henry Riland Bedford (7 June 1903 – 9 October 1976) was an English cricketer who played for Derbyshire in 1924.

Bedford was born in Aston, Birmingham. He was the grandson of W. K. R. Bedford who founded the Free Foresters. Bedford played one first-class match for Derbyshire in the 1924 season which was against Glamorgan in May. Bedford was a right-handed batsman and played two innings in his one first-class match in which he scored a duck and three runs.

Bedford went to live at Brentwood, Essex and continued playing club cricket. He appeared for Gentlemen of Essex in 1933.

Bedford was also a well known archer, being a member of the Woodmen of Arden archery club from 1924 and the clubs secretary from 1948 to 1975. Bedford died at the age of 73 in Chelmsford.
