= George Buckley (Australian politician) =

Australian politician

George Patrick Buckley (1 May 1881 – 30 October 1958) was an Australian politician.

He was born at Tambar Springs to pastoralist James Walter Buckley and Annie Theresa Comber. He worked as a drayman, and on 22 September 1909 married Jessie Emma Jane Hungerford, with whom he had two daughters. He was an organiser and secretary of the Trolley and Drayman's Union, which in 1928 became the Amalgamated Road Transport Workers' Union of Australia (the Transport Workers Union of Australia from 1938). From 1931 to 1934 he was a Labor member of the New South Wales Legislative Council. Buckley died at Petersham in 1958.
