= Hill-Wood baronets =

Baronetcy in the Baronetage of the United Kingdom

The Hill-Wood Baronetcy, of Moorfield in the Parish of Glossop in the County of Derby, is a title in the Baronetage of the United Kingdom. It was created on 25 January 1921 for the businessman and Conservative MP for High Peak, Derbyshire for 19 years, Samuel Hill-Wood. Born Samuel Wood, he was the only son of Samuel Wood, a wealthy cotton manufacturer. He had assumed before the title's creation in 1912 by royal licence the additional surname of Hill, the maiden name of his grandmother Alice, daughter of John Hill, of Liverpool His male-line descendants have continued with this surname.

Sir John Wood, 1st Baronet, of Hengrave in Suffolk, MP for Stalybridge then Stalybridge and Hyde suburbs of Manchester was the uncle of the first holder and older than the first holder's father.

== Hill-Wood baronets, of Moorfield (1921) ==
- Sir Samuel Hill-Wood, 1st Baronet (1872–1949)
- Sir Basil Samuel Hill-Wood, 2nd Baronet (1900–1954)
- Sir David Basil Hill-Wood, 3rd Baronet (1926–2002)
- Sir Samuel Thomas Hill-Wood, 4th Baronet (born 1971)

== See also ==
- Wood baronets
