= Frederick Heath (cricketer) =

English cricketer (1894–1967)

Personal information
- Full name: Frederick Rhead Heath
- Born: 30 October 1894; Swadlincote, Derbyshire, England
- Died: 19 September 1967 (aged 72); Seaford, East Sussex, England
- Relatives: John Heath

Domestic team information
- Years: Team
- 1924–1925: Derbyshire
- First-class debut: 5 July 1924 Derbyshire v Gloucestershire
- Last First-class: 23 May 1925 Derbyshire v Somerset

Career statistics
Competition	First-class
Matches	4
Runs scored	72
Batting average	14.40
100s/50s	/
Top score	17
Balls bowled	71
Wickets	3
Bowling average	15,66
5 wickets in innings
10 wickets in match
Best bowling	2–4
Catches/stumpings	1/-
- Source: , February 2012

Frederick Rhead Heath (30 October 1894 – 19 September 1967) was an English cricketer who played first-class cricket for Derbyshire in 1924 and 1925.

Heath was born at Swadlincote, Derbyshire. He played minor counties cricket for Staffordshire between 1913 and 1921. During World War I he served with the Royal Artillery and was promoted from corporal to 2nd Lieutenant in 1915. He made his debut for Derbyshire against Gloucestershire in July 1924 when he took a wicket and a catch and made 13 in the only innings he played. He played two more matches in 1924 and one in 1925.

Heath played six innings in four first-class matches with an average of 4.40 and a top score of 17. He took three first-class wickets at an average of 15.88 and a best performance of 2 for 4.

Until 1928 Heath was in partnership with Charles Henry Heath as an earthenware manufacturer in the Hartshorne Pottery, Woodville, Derbyshire.

Heath died at Sutton, Seaford, Sussex at the age of 72. His brother John Heath also played for Derbyshire
