= Stuart McMillan (footballer) =

English footballer and cricketer (1896–1963)

Personal information
- Full name: Stuart Thomas McMillan
- Date of birth: 17 September 1896
- Place of birth: Leicester, England
- Date of death: 27 September 1963 (aged 67)
- Place of death: Ashbourne, England
- Height: 5 ft 7 1/4 in (1.71 m)
- Position: Winger

Senior career*
Years	Team	Apps	(Gls)
1914–1915	Derby County	1	(0)
1919–1921	Chelsea	0	(0)
1921–1922	Gillingham	30	(2)
1922–1924	Wolverhampton Wanderers	36	(5)
1924–1927	Bradford City	70	(6)
1927–1928	Nottingham Forest	9	(0)
1928–1929	Clapton Orient	23	(1)

Managerial career
- 1946–1953: Derby County
- * Club domestic league appearances and goals

Stuart Thomas McMillan (17 September 1896 – 27 September 1963) was an English football player and manager, and cricketer. As a footballer, he played as a winger in the Football League for clubs including Derby County, Gillingham, Wolverhampton Wanderers and Bradford City. He later managed Derby between 1946 and 1953, winning the FA Cup in 1946. As a cricketer, he was a right-handed batsman and a right-arm medium-fast bowler who played for Derbyshire.

== Early life ==
Stuart McMillan was born in Leicester on 17 September 1896. His father Johnny McMillan was a Scottish professional footballer and football manager, then playing for Leicester Fosse after recently being transferred from Derby County.

== Football career ==
McMillan became a footballer and played for Derby County, Gillingham, Wolverhampton Wanderers, Bradford City, Nottingham Forest and Clapton Orient in the . He later returned to Derby County as manager between 1946 and 1953, taking them to the 1946 FA Cup Final. Derby defeated Charlton Athletic 4–1 after extra time to win the FA Cup for the first time.

== Cricket career ==
McMillan also played first-class cricket for Derbyshire. His debut came in the 1922 season against Essex at Derby, where, as a middle order batsman, he was unable to make much headway in the match, bowling a single, expensive over, conceding 14 runs, and finishing not out for 0 in the only innings in which he batted. As there was no play on the first day of the match, it was to end in a draw with the best batting performance of the game coming from Essex's centurion Peter Perrin.

McMillan made just one appearance during the following season, and had to wait for more than thirteen months before making his final two appearances, both at home, in 1924. While he scored well in the first match of the season, his second finished with him getting out for a duck.

== Death ==
McMillan died in Ashbourne, Derbyshire, on 27 September 1963, aged 67.

== See also ==
- List of English cricket and football players
