= John Crommelin-Brown =

Personal information
- Full name: John Louis Crommelin-Brown
- Born: 20 October 1888; Delhi, British India
- Died: 11 September 1953 (aged 64); Minehead, Somerset, England
- Batting: Right-handed
- Relatives: John Eggar

Domestic team information
- Years: Team
- 1922–1926: Derbyshire
- FC debut: 26 August 1922 Derbyshire v Worcestershire
- Last FC: 21 August 1926 Derbyshire v Kent

Career statistics
Competition	First-class
Matches	16
Runs scored	659
Batting average	25.34
100s/50s	0/5
Top score	74
Balls bowled	108
Wickets	1
Bowling average	70.00
5 wickets in innings	0
10 wickets in match	0
Best bowling	1/29
Catches/stumpings	9/–
- Source: CricketArchive, January 2012

John Louis Crommelin-Brown (20 October 1888 – 11 September 1953) was an English schoolmaster, poet and first-class cricketer who played for Derbyshire between 1922 and 1926.

Crommelin-Brown was born in Delhi, India, and educated first in Edinburgh at the Edinburgh Academy and Cargilfield School and then in England at Winchester College. On leaving Winchester in 1908 he published Wykehamian Poems and Parodies which included parodies of Rudyard Kipling, Longfellow and Walt Whitman. He went to Cambridge University, where he wrote lyrics for the Cambridge Footlights During the First World War he served as a lieutenant in the Royal Garrison Artillery and wrote war poetry.

Crommelin-Brown became a master at Repton School and made his debut for Derbyshire in the 1922 season. In his debut match against Worcestershire he scored 56 and took a wicket. He did not play again until the 1924 season, and he only played during the school holidays in that and the 1925 and 1926 seasons. He was a right hand batsman and played 28 innings in 16 first-class matches. His highest score was 74 and his average 25.34. He bowled rarely, taking one wicket in total.

Crommelin-Brown died at Old Town, Minehead, Somerset, England, aged 64.

Crommelin-Brown's son-in-law John Eggar, another Repton master, played cricket for Derbyshire after the Second World War.

== Publications ==
- Wykehamian Poems and Parodies
- Dies Heroica: War Poems 1914–1918
- Three Little Fairy Songs. 1. The Fairy Children. 2. Canterbury Bells. 3. Blue-Bell, Dew-Bell.
