= Samuel Hill-Wood =

English politician, businessman and cricketer (1872–1949)

Sir Samuel Hill-Wood Baronet
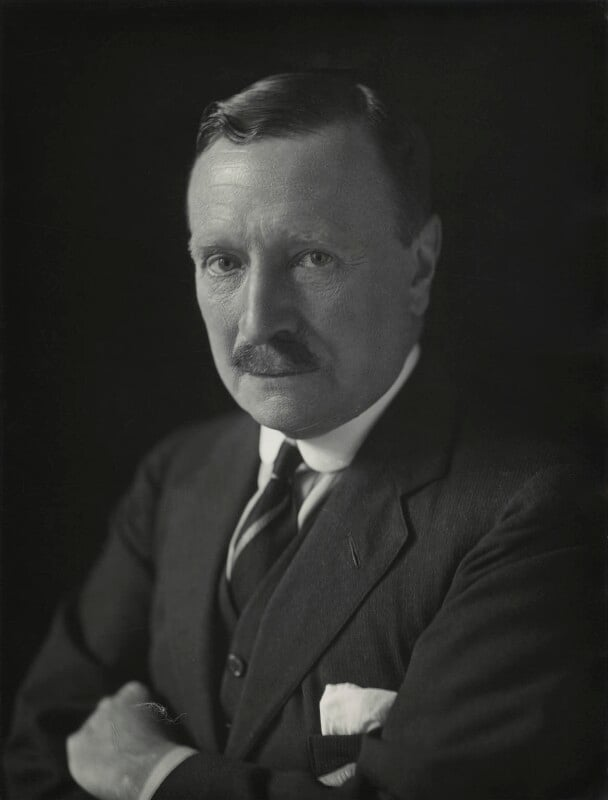
- Hill-Wood in the 1930s

Personal information
- Born: 21 March 1872; Glossop, Derbyshire, England
- Died: 4 January 1949 (aged 76); Westminster, England
- Batting: Right-handed
- Relatives: Basil Hill-Wood (son); Wilfred Hill-Wood (son); Denis Hill-Wood (son); Charles Hill-Wood (son)

Domestic team information
- Years: Team
- 1894–1902: Derbyshire
- FC debut: 30 July 1894 Derbyshire v Yorkshire
- Last FC: 21 August 1902 Derbyshire v Essex

Career statistics
Competition	First-class
Matches	34
Runs scored	758
Batting average	17.62
100s/50s	0/5
Top score	81*
Balls bowled	93
Wickets	0
Bowling average	–
5 wickets in innings	–
10 wickets in match	–
Best bowling	–
Catches/stumpings	12/–
- Source: CricketArchive, 4 February 2010

Sir Samuel Hill Hill-Wood, 1st Baronet (21 March 1872 – 4 January 1949) was a British businessman, Conservative politician, cricketer and football club chairman.

== Early life ==
Wood was born in Glossop, Derbyshire, the son of Samuel Wood, a cotton manufacturer and his wife Annie. His father made his fortune in the cotton industry in Derbyshire during the late 19th century. Samuel Hill Wood was educated at Eton College and was a keen sportsman. He continued to run the cotton business.

== Cricket career ==
Wood made his cricket debut for Derbyshire in the 1894 season, and became their captain in the 1899 season for three seasons. Wood was the only batsman to score 10 runs off one ball in a first-class game. In May 1900, when playing for Derbyshire against Marylebone Cricket Club (MCC), he struck a ball from Cuthbert Burnup and as a result of the netting and an overthrow clocked up ten – a feat which was originally included in the Guinness Book of Records. Wood was a right hand batsman and played 54 innings in 24 first-class matches, with an average of 17.62 and a top score of 81 not out. He took no wickets in the 93 balls he bowled. Under his captaincy Derbyshire were fifteenth in the County Championship in 1899, thirteenth in 1900 and back to fifteenth in 1901.

== Football at Glossop ==
Wood was chairman and owner of Glossop North End funding it up until World War I. His expenditure was estimated to be more than £30,000 at that time. His efforts and enthusiasm led to the club being included in the enlarged Football League Second Division in 1898. He scoured the country for professional footballers and after only one season Glossop qualified as Second Division runners up and were promoted to the First Division. They were relegated after a season and by 1914 Hill Wood severed his connection and Glossop later resigned from the Football League.

== Political career ==
At the January 1910 general election, Hill Wood was elected a Conservative MP for High Peak, being re-elected in December of that year and again in 1918, 1922, 1923, and 1924. He changed his name to Hill-Wood by royal licence in 1912.

In the First World War, he served in the Cheshire Regiment reaching the rank of Major.

Announced in the 1921 New Year Honours, he was created a baronet on 25 January 1921.

== Arsenal chairmanship ==
In 1927 he succeeded Henry Norris as chairman of Arsenal, and presided over the club during its first period of success in the 1930s. He stepped down in 1936 but returned to the role after the Second World War, holding the post until his death in Westminster in 1949. In another field of sport, he owned two greyhounds who won the Waterloo Cup.

== Family ==
Hill Wood married The Hon. Rachel Bateman-Hanbury, youngest daughter of Lord Bateman-Hanbury, in 1899 and had four sons: Basil, Wilfred, Denis and Charles. His son Denis and his grandson Peter Hill-Wood have also served as Chairmen of Arsenal, while his sons, Basil, Denis, Wilfred and Charles have all played county cricket for Derbyshire at various points in their history. Basil's brother-in-law David Brand also played some first class cricket.

Parliament of the United Kingdom
Preceded by Oswald Partington	Member of Parliament for High Peak; 1910–1929	Succeeded by Alfred Joseph Law
Baronetage of the United Kingdom
New title	Baronet (of Moorfield); 1921–1929	Succeeded by Basil Samuel Hill-Wood
Sporting positions
Preceded by Sydney Evershed	Derbyshire cricket captains 1899–1901	Succeeded by Albert Lawton
