= George Buckley (cricketer, born 1889) =

English cricketer

George Arthur Buckley (3 February 1889 – 1 December 1935) was an English cricketer who played first-class cricket for Derbyshire in 1921.

Buckley was born in Skegby, near Mansfield, Nottinghamshire. He made three minor Counties Championship appearances in 1909 for Cheshire. In 1913 he was playing for Keighley and Craven District, and was selected for Nottinghamshire against Leicestershire but had to withdraw because of injury. He made his first-class debut and only appearance for Derbyshire against Yorkshire in June 1921. His batting scores were 8 and 2, and he bowled 10 overs without taking a wicket.

Buckley was a right-handed batsman and scored a total of ten runs in two innings in one first-class match. He was a right-arm medium-fast bowler and took no wickets in 10 overs.

Buckley became a director of Sheffield United Cricket and Football Club. He died in Norton Lees, Yorkshire aged 46.
