= Herbert Turland =

English cricketer

Herbert Turland (29 August 1894 — 23 May 1973) was an English cricketer who played first-class cricket for Derbyshire in 1921 and Nottinghamshire in 1924.

Turland was born in Stapleford, Nottinghamshire. He made his debut first-class appearance Derbyshire in June 1921 against Yorkshire. He opened the batting and made one run in two innings, and that was also his last game for Derbyshire. In 1924 Turland played for Nottinghamshire, and in a match against the South African tourists, scored 29 runs in his first innings and made no runs in the second. He later played in Nottinghamshire's second XI. Turland was a right-handed batsman and played four innings in two first-class matches with an average of 7.5 and a top score of 29. He was left-arm medium-pace bowler and took two overs without taking a wicket.

Turland died in Illogan North, Cornwall at the age of 78.
