= George Goodwin (cricketer) =

English cricketer

George William Goodwin (born 7 September 1898, date of death unknown) was an English cricketer who played for Derbyshire during the 1921 season.

Goodwin made his first appearance for Derbyshire against Gloucestershire in July 1921, scoring 29 in his first innings and 30 in his second. While his early career as an upper-middle order batsman showed promise, he was soon being dismissed for smaller totals than his earlier form would have allowed for, apart from a half-century against Nottinghamshire and 42 not out against Essex. He played in Derbyshire's last match of the season against Glamorgan, but did not reappear in the following season.

Goodwin was a left-handed batsman who played 16 innings in 8 matches with top score of 53 and an average of 14.93. He was a slow left-arm orthodox bowler and took a total of 7 wickets at an average of 29.28 and a best performance of 4-25.

Goodwin's brother, Harry, four and a half years his junior, played Minor Counties cricket for Staffordshire for three years.
