= Derbyshire County Cricket Club in 1951 =

1951 season of an English cricket team

Derbyshire County Cricket Club seasons
1951 season
- Captain: Guy Willatt
- County Championship: 11
- Most runs: Charlie Elliott
- Most wickets: Cliff Gladwin

Derbyshire County Cricket Club in 1951 was the cricket season when the English club Derbyshire had been playing for eighty years. It was their forty-seventh season in the County Championship and they won five matches and lost seven to finish eleventh in the County Championship.

== 1951 season ==
Guy Willatt was in his first full year as captain. He had been appointed in the previous year but because of injury was substituted by Pat Vaulkhard for 1950. His appointment ended a period of uncertainty since the end of the Second World War, when apart from Edward Gothard, no one was available to captain for more than one year.

Derbyshire played 28 games in the County Championship, and one match against the touring South Africans. They won five matches altogether, but a disproportionate number of matches were drawn. Charlie Elliott was top scorer and C Gladwin took most wickets with 123.

The club retained a virtually unchanged squad with only one newcomer – Edwin Smith who played on for 20 years.

=== Matches ===
List of matches
| No. | Date | V | Result | Margin | Notes |
|---|---|---|---|---|---|
| 1 | 5 May 1951 | Worcestershire; County Ground, New Road, Worcester | Drawn | | Don Kenyon 100; |
| 2 | 9 May 1951 | Leicestershire; Grace Road, Leicester | Drawn | | TA Hall 5–57 |
| 3 | 12 May 1951 | Warwickshire; Edgbaston, Birmingham | Drawn | | |
| 4 | 16 May 1951 | Sussex; County Ground, Derby | Drawn | | Langridge 200; AEG Rhodes 5–23 |
| 5 | 19 May 1951 | Yorkshire; Queen's Park, Chesterfield | Lost | 7 wickets | |
| 6 | 26 May 1951 | Gloucestershire; County Ground, Derby | Lost | 67 runs | DC Morgan 6–93 |
| 7 | 2 Jun 1951 | Glamorgan; Cardiff Arms Park | Lost | Innings and 120 runs | Davies 146; Parkhouse 107; Jim McConnon 7–69 and 7–84 |
| 8 | 6 Jun 1951 | Hampshire; Queen's Park, Chesterfield | Drawn | | Rogers 151; C Gladwin 6–108 |
| 9 | 9 Jun 1951 | Northamptonshire; County Ground, Northampton | Drawn | | Oldfield 140 |
| 10 | 13 Jun 1951 | Somerset; Agricultural Showgrounds, Frome | Won | 125 runs | J Redman 7–23 |
| 11 | 16 Jun 1951 | Gloucestershire; Wagon Works Ground, Gloucester | Drawn | | Crapp 105; AC Revill 137 |
| 12 | 20 Jun 1951 | Kent; County Ground, Derby | Drawn | | HL Jackson 5–90; Wright 5–90 |
| 13 | 23 Jun 1951 | Lancashire; Queen's Park, Chesterfield | Lost | 15 runs | Washbrook 103; |
| 14 | 27 Jun 1951 | Essex; Gidea Park Sports Ground, Romford | Drawn | | CS Elliott 166; C Gladwin 5–65 and 5–44; Bailey 6–44; |
| 15 | 4 Jul 1951 | Middlesex; Park Road Ground, Buxton | Drawn | | A Hamer165; |
| 16 | 7 Jul 1951 | Hampshire; United Services Recreation Ground, Portsmouth | Won | 113 Runs | AC Revill 104; C Gladwin 7–74; HL Jackson 5–34 |
| 17 | 14 Jul 1951 | Lancashire; Old Trafford, Manchester | Drawn | | C Gladwin 5–42 and 5–76; Brian Statham 5–20 |
| 18 | 18 Jul 1951 | Derbyshire v South Africans; County Ground, Derby | Lost | 8 wickets | |
| 19 | 21 Jul 1951 | Glamorgan; Queen's Park, Chesterfield | Lost | Innings and 94 runs | Muncer 107, 5–34 and 5–23 |
| 20 | 25 Jul 1951 | Kent; Cheriton Road Sports Ground, Folkestone | Won | 177 runs | DB Carr 103; Ridgway 6–44; C Gladwin 7–55; AEG Rhodes 6–57 |
| 21 | 28 Jul 1951 | Nottinghamshire; Rutland Recreation Ground, Ilkeston | Won | Innings and 114 runs | Willatt 111; AC Revill 123; C Gladwin 8–40 |
| 22 | 1 Aug 1951 | Yorkshire; St George's Road, Harrogate | Drawn | | Wilson 120; Watson 108; Fred Trueman 6–59; Bob Appleyard 5–42 |
| 23 | 4 Aug 1951 | Warwickshire; County Ground, Derby | Drawn | | Eric Hollies 7–67 |
| 24 | 8 Aug 1951 | Worcestershire; Queen's Park, Chesterfield | Lost | 139 runs | C Gladwin 6–108; Howorth 5–33 and 5–32; E Smith 8–21; Perks 5–33 |
| 25 | 11 Aug 1951 | Nottinghamshire; Trent Bridge, Nottingham | Drawn | | Clay 108; Cox 6–30 |
| 26 | 15 Aug 1951 | Surrey; County Ground, Derby | Drawn | | CS Elliott 121; C Gladwin 5–80 |
| 27 | 18 Aug 1951 | Sussex; The Saffrons, Eastbourne | Drawn | | Hubert Doggart 126; David Sheppard 183; James Langridge 5–84 |
| 28 | 22 Aug 1951 | Leicestershire; Ind Coope Ground, Burton-on-Trent | Won | Innings and 23 runs | A Eato 5–14; Sperry 5–60; HL Jackson 5–34; AEG Rhodes 5–49 |
| 29 | 25 Aug 1951 | Essex; Ind Coope Ground, Burton-on-Trent | Drawn | | T Smith 5–22; C Gladwin 7–55 |

== Statistics ==
=== County Championship batting averages ===
| Name | Matches | Inns | Runs | High score | Average | 100s |
|---|---|---|---|---|---|---|
| DB Carr | 9 | 14 | 425 | 103* | 38.63 | 1 |
| AC Revill | 27 | 45 | 1435 | 137 | 36.79 | 3 |
| CS Elliott | 26 | 46 | 1456 | 166 | 35.51 | 2 |
| R Sale | 6 | 7 | 196 | 64 | 32.66 | 0 |
| A Hamer | 28 | 49 | 1421 | 165 | 30.23 | 1 |
| D Smith | 11 | 16 | 303 | 56 | 21.64 | 0 |
| JM Kelly | 26 | 43 | 833 | 97* | 21.35 | 0 |
| DC Morgan | 15 | 19 | 311 | 63 | 19.43 | 0 |
| GL Willatt | 28 | 44 | 747 | 111 | 17.78 | 1 |
| AEG Rhodes | 28 | 42 | 658 | 77 | 17.78 | 0 |
| C Gladwin | 23 | 30 | 417 | 62 | 17.37 | 0 |
| GO Dawkes | 28 | 39 | 541 | 61 | 15.45 | 0 |
| P Vaulkhard | 3 | 5 | 75 | 43 | 15.00 | 0 |
| BH Richardson | 8 | 12 | 101 | 19 | 12.62 | 0 |
| HL Jackson | 20 | 19 | 126 | 39* | 12.60 | 0 |
| TA Hall | 12 | 18 | 81 | 20* | 6.23 | 0 |
| A Eato | 7 | 8 | 31 | 10 | 5.16 | 0 |
| E Smith | 3 | 4 | 2 | 2 | 2.00 | 0 |

Additionally John Eggar appeared in the match against the South Africans.

=== County Championship bowling averages ===
| Name | Balls | Runs | Wickets | BB | Average |
|---|---|---|---|---|---|
| C Gladwin | 5786 | 2192 | 123 | 8–40 | 17.82 |
| HL Jackson | 3580 | 1379 | 72 | 5–29 | 19.15 |
| AEG Rhodes | 4918 | 2212 | 68 | 7–56 | 32.52 |
| DC Morgan | 2311 | 1044 | 41 | 6–93 | 25.46 |
| TA Hall | 1778 | 773 | 35 | 5–57 | 22.08 |
| A Eato | 840 | 394 | 13 | 5–14 | 30.30 |
| A Hamer | 1526 | 626 | 13 | 2–7 | 48.15 |
| E Smith | 301 | 167 | 10 | 8–21 | 16.70 |
| DB Carr | 314 | 200 | 8 | 3–22 | 25.00 |
| BH Richardson | 528 | 229 | 6 | 1–7 | 38.16 |
| AC Revill | 219 | 134 | 3 | 1–10 | 44.66 |
| JM Kelly | 26 | 2 | 0 | | |
| GL Willatt | 18 | 20 | 0 | | |

== Wicket Keepers ==
- GO Dawkes Catches 51, Stumping 9

== See also ==
- Derbyshire County Cricket Club seasons
- 1951 English cricket season
