= Derbyshire County Cricket Club in 1952 =

1952 season of an English cricket team

Derbyshire County Cricket Club seasons
1952 season
- Captain: Guy Willatt
- County Championship: 4
- Most runs: Charlie Elliott
- Most wickets: Cliff Gladwin

Derbyshire County Cricket Club in 1952 was the cricket season when the English club Derbyshire had been playing for eighty one years. It was their forty-eighth season in the County Championship and they won eleven matches and lost eight to finish fourth in the County Championship.

== 1952 season ==
Derbyshire played 28 games in the County Championship, and one match against the touring Indians. They won eleven matches altogether. Guy Willatt was in his second year as captain. Charlie Elliott was top scorer and C Gladwin took most wickets for the club and was fifth nationally. There were no new players in the Derbyshire team.

=== Matches ===
List of matches
No.	Date	V	Result	Margin	Notes
1	7 May 1952	Middlesex; Lord's Cricket Ground, St John's Wood	Lost	9 wickets	Moss 5–15
2	10 May 1952	Essex; County Ground, Chelmsford	Lost	9 wickets	R Smith 5–83 and 5–33; C Gladwin 5–41
3	17 May 1952	Leicestershire; County Ground, Derby	Drawn		Goodwin 5–44; C Gladwin 5–52
4	21 May 1952	Worcestershire; Queen's Park, Chesterfield	Won	10 wickets	GL Willatt 146; Perks 5–98; C Gladwin 5–67
5	24 May 1952	Yorkshire; Bramall Lane, Sheffield	Lost	Innings and 26 runs	Wilson 230; Halliday 6–79
6	31 May 1952	Warwickshire; County Ground, Derby	Won	Innings and 42 runs	Pritchard 6–76; C Gladwin 5–24
7	4 Jun 1952	Lancashire; Old Trafford, Manchester	Lost	83 runs	HL Jackson 9–60; C Gladwin 5–89; Hilton 6–34
8	7 Jun 1952	Yorkshire; Queen's Park, Chesterfield	Won	81 runs	AC Revill 101; GL Willatt 113; Wardle 5–72
9	11 Jun 1952	Sussex; Rutland Recreation Ground, Ilkeston	Won	100 runs	Wood 5–73; Oakman 5–32
10	14 Jun 1952	Nottinghamshire; Trent Bridge, Nottingham	Drawn		Martin 122; Hardstaff 116; A Hamer 161; Stocks 5–64
11	18 Jun 1952	Somerset; County Ground, Derby	Drawn		
12	21 Jun 1952	Northamptonshire; Queen's Park, Chesterfield	Won	8 wickets	Brookes 152
13	28 Jun 1952	Glamorgan; St Helen's, Swansea	Drawn		AEG Rhodes 5–56; C Gladwin 5–50
14	5 Jul 1952	Lancashire; Ind Coope Ground, Burton-on-Trent	Drawn		Edrich 117; AEG Rhodes 5–123; Tattershal 7–103; C Gladwin 5–68
15	9 Jul 1952	Indians; Queen's Park, Chesterfield	Drawn		Chowdhury 5–30; HL Jackson 6–39
16	12 Jul 1952	Somerset; County Ground, Taunton	Drawn		Gimblet 146 and 116; CS Elliott 168
17	16 Jul 1952	Middlesex; County Ground, Derby	Won	52 runs	A Hamer 110; HL Jackson 6–96; Compton 6–77; AEG Rhodes 5–58
18	19 Jul 1952	Leicestershire; Bath Grounds, Ashby-de-la-Zouch	Won	59 runs	Walsh 6–98; HL Jackson 5–18
19	23 Jul 1952	Worcestershire; Amblecote, Stourbridge	Won	Innings and 57 runs	CS Elliott 122; Lobban 6–52; C Gladwin 7–43 and 9–41
20	26 Jul 1952	Nottinghamshire; Rutland Recreation Ground, Ilkeston	Won	Innings and 93 runs	Poole 219; A Hamer 165; DB Carr 116
21	30 Jul 1952	Surrey; Queen's Park, Chesterfield	Lost	6 wickets	HL Jackson 5–63
22	2 Aug 1952	Warwickshire; Edgbaston, Birmingham	Drawn		Dollery 100; HL Jackson 5–30; Grove 6–64
23	6 Aug 1952	Kent; St Lawrence Ground, Canterbury	Drawn		C Gladwin 6–81; Page 5-56
24	9 Aug 1952	Northamptonshire; Wellingborough School Ground	Won	5 wickets	Livingston 106; E Smith 5–49; Starkie 5–61
25	13 Aug 1952	Glamorgan; County Ground, Derby	Lost	2 wickets	DC Morgan 5–38
26	16 Aug 1952	Hampshire; Queen's Park, Chesterfield	Drawn		AC Revill 101; C Gladwin 5–30
27	20 Aug 1952	Surrey; Kennington Oval	Lost	212 runs	C Gladwin 5–44; Lock 6–16
28	23 Aug 1952	Gloucestershire; Park Road Ground, Buxton	Won	29 runs	Scott 6–45; Lambert 7–75
29	30 Aug 1952	Sussex; County Ground, Hove	Lost	130 runs	Marlar 5–20; Oakes 5–31

== Statistics ==
=== County Championship batting averages ===
Name	Matches	Inns	Runs	High score	Average	100s
CS Elliott	26	46	1569	168	35.65	2
GL Willatt	25	42	1354	146	33.85	2
AC Revill	28	50	1431	101	31.10	2
P Vaulkhard	2	2	62	62	31.00	0
A Hamer	28	50	1377	165	27.54	3
DC Morgan	28	47	854	73	22.47	0
DB Carr	22	39	792	116	22.00	1
R Sale	6	11	196	47	19.60	0
JM Kelly	19	31	557	93	18.56	0
GO Dawkes	28	48	551	55*	16.69	0
AEG Rhodes	26	42	646	60	16.15	0
C Gladwin	28	41	446	53*	14.38	0
D Smith	1	2	26	16	13.00	0
BH Richardson	2	3	21	9	10.50	0
TA Hall	2	3	17	9*	8.50	0
HL Jackson	25	33	168	32	6.00	0
E Smith	11	13	23	11	4.60	0
MH Stevenson	1	1	0	0	0.00	0

Leading first-class batsmen for Derbyshire by runs scored
Name	Mat	Inns	Runs	HS	Ave	100
CS Elliott	27	48	1599	168	33.31	2
AC Revill	29	52	1433	101	27.56	2
A Hamer	29	52	1478	165	28.42	3
GL Willatt	26	44	1438	146	32.68	2
DC Morgan	29	49	921	73	18.80	0

=== County Championship bowling averages ===
Name	Balls	Runs	Wickets	BB	Average
C Gladwin	7322	2802	151	9–41	18.55
HL Jackson	4888	1988	108	9–60	18.40
AEG Rhodes	4595	2025	81	5–56	25.00
DC Morgan	3500	1608	67	5–38	24.00
E Smith	1710	747	26	5–49	28.73
DB Carr	571	321	8	3–41	40.12
A Hamer	692	309	6	2–11	51.50
TA Hall	114	66	2	1–13	33.00
R Sale	2	4	1	1–4	4.00
CS Elliott	15	24	1	1–15	24.00
AC Revill	72	57	1	1–57	57.00
BH Richardson	18	15	0		
GL Willatt	12	4	0		

Leading first class bowlers for Derbyshire by wickets taken
Name	Balls	Runs	Wkts	BBI	Ave
C Gladwin	7322	2802	151	9–41	18.55
HL Jackson	5051	2056	114	9–60	18.03
AEG Rhodes	4679	2071	83	5–56	24.95
DC Morgan	3630	1662	71	5–38	23.41
E Smith	1728	758	26	5–49	29.15

=== Wicket keeping ===
- GO Dawkes Catches 51, Stumping 12

== See also ==
- Derbyshire County Cricket Club seasons
- 1952 English cricket season
