= Derbyshire County Cricket Club in 1950 =

1950 season of an English cricket team

Derbyshire County Cricket Club seasons
1950 season
- Captain: Pat Vaulkhard
- County Championship: 5
- Most runs: Alan Revill
- Most wickets: Dusty Rhodes
- Most catches: George Dawkes

Derbyshire County Cricket Club in 1950 was the cricket season when the English club Derbyshire had been playing for seventy-nine years. It was their forty-sixth season in the County Championship and they won eight matches in the County Championship to finish in fifth place.

== 1950 season ==
Derbyshire played 28 matches in the County Championship, one against Oxford University and one against the touring West Indies. Pat Vaulkhard was captain. Alan Revill scored most runs, and Dusty Rhodes took most wickets with 125.

Guy Willatt joined Derbyshire as designated captain but was hampered by injury and did not fill the role until the following season. Derek Morgan who also joined was another future captain and played until 1969. A third key played making his debut was Arnold Hamer who scored over 15,000 runs over ten years. John Kelly joined Derbyshire from Lancashire and played for ten years and Alwyn Eato a former footballer played for five years. Bertram Richardson played for four years, and Mike Stevenson who was at Cambridge University played occasional games in two seasons.

=== Matches ===
List of matches
No.	Date	V	Result	Margin	Notes
1	10 May 1950	Surrey; Kennington Oval	Lost	4 wickets	HL Jackson 5-41; Laker 5-57
2	13 May 1950	Northamptonshire; County Ground, Derby	Won	6 wickets	AC Revill 108
3	20 May 1950	Somerset; Queen's Park, Chesterfield	Drawn		Hazell 6-76; AEG Rhodes 5-14
4	24 May 1950	Middlesex; Lord's Cricket Ground, St John's Wood	Drawn		
5	27 May 1950	Warwickshire; County Ground, Derby	Drawn		Dollery 163; Pritchard 6-78
6	31 May 1950	Leicestershire; Grace Road, Leicester	Lost	4 wickets	Tompkin 130; AC Revill 119; Lester 6-87
7	03 Jun 1950	Yorkshire; Park Avenue Cricket Ground, Bradford	Won	79 runs	D Smith 122; Len Hutton 107; AEG Rhodes 6-74
8	07 Jun 1950	Worcestershire; Rutland Recreation Ground, Ilkeston	Won	65 runs	HL Jackson 6-57
9	10 Jun 1950	Oxford University; The University Parks, Oxford	Drawn		PDS Blake 101; AEG Rhodes 7-68
10	14 Jun 1950	Glamorgan; The Gnoll, Neath	Lost	92 runs	HL Jackson 5-38 and 6-63; Trick 5-18
11	17 Jun 1950	Gloucestershire; Ashley Down Ground, Bristol	Lost	81 runs	Young 117; HL Jackson 6-37; Cook 6-82; Goddard 7-42
12	21 Jun 1950	Glamorgan; County Ground, Derby	Drawn		
13	24 Jun 1950	Lancashire; Park Road Ground, Buxton	Drawn		Ikin 103; Tattershall 6-46;
14	28 Jun 1950	Yorkshire; Queen's Park, Chesterfield	Lost	7 wickets	Halliday 144; AEG Rhodes 5-82
15	01 Jul 1950	Nottinghamshire; Rutland Recreation Ground, Ilkeston	Lost	1 wicket	CS Elliott 158; Jepson 5-68
16	05 Jul 1950	Worcestershire; County Ground, New Road, Worcester	Lost	4 wickets	Jenkins 7-31; P Jackson 7-107
17	08 Jul 1950	Lancashire; Old Trafford, Manchester	Won	83 runs	AC Revill 109; AEG Rhodes 5-79; Tattershall 5-72
18	12 Jul 1950	Hampshire; County Ground, Derby	Drawn		TA Hall 5-60
19	15 Jul 1950	West Indies; Queen's Park, Chesterfield	Drawn		C Gladwin 6-40
20	22 Jul 1950	Essex; Queen's Park, Chesterfield	Won	6 wickets	Bailey 5-54
21	26 Jul 1950	Sussex; Ind Coope Ground, Burton-on-Trent	Drawn		Langridge 184; HL Jackson 5-27
22	29 Jul 1950	Hampshire; County Ground, Southampton	Lost	49 runs	Knott 5-83 and 7-93; C Gladwin 5-51
23	05 Aug 1950	Warwickshire; Edgbaston, Birmingham	Won	8 wickets	Grove 6-60; HL Jackson 5-22 and 5-76
24	09 Aug 1950	Gloucestershire; County Ground, Derby	Drawn		DM Young 149
25	12 Aug 1950	Nottinghamshire; Trent Bridge, Nottingham	Drawn		AEG Rhodes 6-69; Butler 5-38
26	16 Aug 1950	Leicestershire; Queen's Park, Chesterfield	Drawn		Berry 118
27	19 Aug 1950	Kent; County Ground, Derby	Won	Innings and 98 runs	C Gladwin 6-56
28	23 Aug 1950	Kent; Crabble Athletic Ground, Dover	Lost	9 wickets	C Gladwin 7-73; Wright 6-45
29	26 Aug 1950	Essex; Southchurch Park, Southend-on-Sea	Won	10 wickets	JM Kelly 130; Gladwin 7-80
30	30 Aug 1950	Sussex; County Ground, Hove	Drawn		

== Statistics ==
=== County Championship batting averages ===
Name	Matches	Inns	Runs	High score	Average	100s
R Sale	2	2	77	73	77.00	0
DB Carr	3	6	215	84	43.00	0
JD Eggar	5	5	151	90*	37.75	0
AC Revill	28	48	1542	119	35.86	3
D Smith	22	39	1117	122*	33.84	1
A Hamer	21	37	1029	80	28.58	0
CS Elliott	28	49	1336	158	27.83	1
JM Kelly	18	32	742	130	23.93	1
P Vaulkhard	27	45	894	98	21.28	0
C Gladwin	16	19	283	77*	20.21	0
AEG Rhodes	28	45	684	75	16.68	0
DC Morgan	27	39	469	57	16.17	0
GO Dawkes	23	37	406	56	13.53	0
TA Hall	11	18	186	52	10.94	0
A F Townsend	2	3	28	24	9.33	0
A Eato	1	1	9	9	9.00	0
BH Richardson	13	15	78	22	8.66	0
HL Johnson	5	8	67	33	8.37	0
MH Stevenson	2	3	23	15	7.66	0
HL Jackson	23	28	64	19*	3.76	0
T R Armstrong	1	1	3	3	3.00	0
W H Copson	1	2	1	1	1.00	0
GL Willatt	1	1	2	2*		0

Leading first-class batsmen for Derbyshire by runs scored
Name	Mat	Inns	Runs	HS	Ave	100
AC Revill	30	51	1643	119	32.21	3
CS Elliott	30	52	1454	158	27.96	1
D Smith	22	39	1117	122*	33.84	1
A Hamer	22	39	1133	80	29.05	0
P Vaulkhard	29	48	940	98	19.58	0

=== County Championship bowling averages ===
Name	Balls	Runs	Wickets	BB	Average
AEG Rhodes	6206	2576	114	6-69	22.59
HL Jackson	4213	1726	89	6-37	19.39
C Gladwin	3967	1406	77	7-73	18.25
DC Morgan	3583	1751	63	4-52	27.79
TA Hall	1593	884	32	5-60	27.62
BH Richardson	1264	562	21	4-39	26.76
A Hamer	473	209	15	4-27	13.93
DB Carr	224	110	4	4-54	27.50
W H Copson	264	97	2	2-55	48.50
HL Johnson	36	26	1	1-11	26.00
T R Armstrong	126	56	0		
A Eato	84	60	0		
AC Revill	48	24	0		
P Vaulkhard	42	36	0		
D Smith	34	17	0		
CS Elliott	12	21	0		

Leading first class bowlers for Derbyshire by wickets taken
Name	Balls	Runs	Wkts	BBI	Ave
AEG Rhodes	6710	2760	125	7-68	22.08
HL Jackson	4577	1882	92	6-37	20.45
C Gladwin	4231	1473	85	7-73	17.32
DC Morgan	3583	1751	63	4-52	27.79
TA Hall	1641	908	32	5-60	28.37

=== Wicket Keeping ===
- GO Dawkes First Class Catches 49, Stumping 10
- D Smith First Class Catches 20, Stumping 1

== See also ==
- Derbyshire County Cricket Club seasons
- 1950 English cricket season
