= Derbyshire County Cricket Club in 1955 =

1955 season of an English cricket team

Derbyshire County Cricket Club seasons
1955 season
- Captain: Donald Carr
- County Championship: 8
- Most runs: Arnold Hamer
- Most wickets: Cliff Gladwin
- Most catches: George Dawkes

Derbyshire County Cricket Club in 1955 was the cricket season when the English club Derbyshire had been playing for eighty four years. It was their fifty-first season in the County Championship and they won ten matches and lost ten to finish eighth in the County Championship.

== 1955 season ==
Derbyshire played 28 games in the County Championship, one match against the touring South Africans and one match against Scotland. They won ten matches, lost ten matches and drew ten matches. Donald Carr took over the captaincy. Arnold Hamer was top scorer and Cliff Gladwin took most wickets for the club. Derek Hall was the only player to make his first class debut in the Derbyshire team.

=== Matches ===
List of matches
No.	Date	V	Result	Margin	Notes
1	7 May 1955	Middlesex; Lord's Cricket Ground, St John's Wood	Drawn		JA Young 5-43; HL Jackson 5-27; Moss 6-45
2	11 May 1955	South Africans; County Ground, Derby	Drawn		
3	14 May 1955	Essex; Valentine's Park, Ilford	Drawn		C Gladwin 5-41; Bailey 5-56
4	18 May 1955	Kent; Bat and Ball Ground, Gravesend	Won	Innings and 51 runs	DC Morgan 109
5	21 May 1955	Yorkshire; Queen's Park, Chesterfield	Lost	139 runs	Appleyard 5-51 and 5-29
6	25 May 1955	Kent; County Ground, Derby	Won	Innings and 21 runs	HL Jackson 6-40; Ridgway 5-109
7	28 May 1955	Warwickshire; Edgbaston, Birmingham	Drawn		
8	1 Jun 1955	Worcestershire; County Ground, New Road, Worcester	Won	144 runs	Horton 5-123; E Smith 6-45
9	4 Jun 1955	Leicestershire; Ind Coope Ground, Burton-on-Trent	Drawn		HL Jackson 5-59.; C Gladwin 5-59
10	8 Jun 1955	Gloucestershire; Ashley Down Ground, Bristol	Drawn		Wells 6-52 and 5-30; C Gladwin 5-28; E Smith 5-39
11	15 Jun 1955	Essex; Queen's Park, Chesterfield	Drawn		Insole 104; E Smith 6-69; Preston 5-61
12	18 Jun 1955	Glamorgan; Cardiff Arms Park	Won	132 runs	
13	25 Jun 1955	Lancashire; Queen's Park, Chesterfield	Lost	129 runs	Hilton 6-59; DB Carr 7-53; Collins 5-30
14	29 Jun 1955	Glamorgan; County Ground, Derby	Drawn		A Hamer 111; Wooller 5-64; HL Jackson 5-39
15	2 Jul 1955	Lancashire; Old Trafford, Manchester	Lost	8 wickets	Grieves 137; Statham 5-57
16	6 Jul 1955	Hampshire; County Ground, Southampton	Won	26 runs	Sainsbury 5-45; DC Morgan 5-41
17	9 Jul 1955	Leicestershire; Bath Grounds, Ashby-de-la-Zouch	Drawn		DB Carr 146; V Jackson 100
18	13 Jul 1955	Nottinghamshire; Trent Bridge, Nottingham	Won	11 runs	A Hamer 227; Dooland 5-95; Smales 7-44
19	16 Jul 1955	Hampshire; Queen's Park, Chesterfield	Lost	58 runs	E Smith 5-22
20	23 Jul 1955	Nottinghamshire; Rutland Recreation Ground, Ilkeston	Drawn		Poole 122; Matthews 6-65; Smales 6-91
21	27 Jul 1955	Northamptonshire; Queen's Park, Chesterfield	Lost	6 wickets	Barrick 105
22	30 Jul 1955	Warwickshire; County Ground, Derby	Lost	164 runs	Hitchcock 110; HJ Rhodes 6-86
23	3 Aug 1955	Scotland; Grange Cricket Club Ground, Raeburn Place, Edinburgh	Won	8 wickets	GL Willatt 133; E Smith 5-66 and 9-46; Kerrigan 6-87
24	6 Aug 1955	Yorkshire; Park Avenue Cricket Ground, Bradford	Lost	Innings and 94 runs	Sutcliffe 133; Close 6-63
25	10 Aug 1955	Sussex; County Ground, Derby	Lost	49 runs	James 6-56; C Gladwin 6-44; DV Smith 5-58
26	13 Aug 1955	Worcestershire; Park Road Ground, Buxton	Won	7 wickets	C Gladwin 5-36
27	20 Aug 1955	Gloucestershire; County Ground, Derby	Won	Innings and 36 runs	DB Carr 139; C Gladwin 7-16
28	24 Aug 1955	Somerset; Queen's Park, Chesterfield	Won	115 runs	Lobb 5-41; C Gladwin 5-22
29	27 Aug 1955	Sussex; County Ground, Hove	Lost	94 runs	Oakman 102; Parks 101; E Smith 6-80; Marlar 5-58 and 7-98
30	31 Aug 1955	Surrey; Kennington Oval	Lost	8 wickets	Lock 5-37; Surridge 6-56

== Statistics ==
=== County Championship batting averages ===
Name	Matches	Inns	Runs	High score	Average	100s
A Hamer	28	49	1509	227	31.43	2
DB Carr	28	48	1438	146	31.26	2
GL Willatt	5	9	228	68	25.33	0
AC Revill	28	49	1146	79	24.91	0
JM Kelly	28	49	974	72	20.29	0
GO Dawkes	28	46	806	86	20.15	0
DJ Green	6	11	185	49	18.50	0
DC Morgan	26	43	681	109*	17.92	1
HL Johnson	25	42	654	52	15.95	0
G Wyatt	4	7	63	31*	15.75	0
C Gladwin	27	39	435	67	15.00	0
E Smith	28	39	350	57	12.50	0
C Lee	16	27	303	63	11.65	0
HJ Rhodes	4	7	47	34	11.75	0
HL Jackson	15	16	123	20*	11.18	0
R Carter	3	6	35	10	7.00	0
D Hall	7	14	29	6*	4.14	0
A Eato	2	2	6	6	3.00	0

Leading first-class batsmen for Derbyshire by runs scored
Name	Mat	Inns	Runs	HS	Ave	100
A Hamer	30	53	1669	227	31.49	2
DB Carr	30	51	1462	146	28.67	2
AC Revill	30	52	1175	79	22.59	
JM Kelly	30	53	1110	72	20.94	0
GO Dawkes	30	48	833	86	17.35	0

=== County Championship bowling averages ===
Name	Balls	Runs	Wickets	BB	Average
C Gladwin	6451	2155	139	7-16	15.50
E Smith	4850	1734	91	6-45	19.05
HL Jackson	2671	877	61	6-40	14.37
DC Morgan	3776	1727	58	5-41	29.77
DB Carr	1780	862	40	7-53	21.55
D Hall	1141	580	23	4-57	25.21
AC Revill	766	358	12	2-11	29.83
HJ Rhodes	631	322	9	6-86	35.77
A Eato	258	156	4	2-20	39.00
R Carter	132	79	3	2-24	26.33
HL Johnson	79	52	3	3-30	17.33
JM Kelly	66	25	1	1-21	25.00
A Hamer	132	66	0		
C Lee	78	29	0		
GO Dawkes	6	9	0		

Leading first class bowlers for Derbyshire by wickets taken
Name	Balls	Runs	Wkts	BBI	Ave
C Gladwin	6610	2181	142	7-16	15.36
E Smith	5270	1854	105	9-46	17.66
HL Jackson	2815	914	64	6-40	14.28
DC Morgan	3926	1774	61	5-41	29.08
DB Carr	1997	974	43	7-53	22.65

=== Wicket Keeping ===
- George Dawkes Catches 52, Stumping 14

== See also ==
- Derbyshire County Cricket Club seasons
- 1955 English cricket season
