= Derbyshire County Cricket Club in 1948 =

1948 season of an English cricket team

Derbyshire County Cricket Club seasons
1948 season
- Captain: Edward Gothard
- County Championship: 6
- Most runs: Charlie Elliott
- Most wickets: Cliff Gladwin
- Most catches: George Dawkes

Derbyshire County Cricket Club in 1948 was the cricket season when the English club Derbyshire had been playing for seventy-seven years. It was their forty-fourth season in the County Championship and they won eleven matches to finish sixth in the County Championship.

== 1948 season ==
Derbyshire played 26 matches in the County Championship and one against the touring Australians. They lost to the Australians and in the County Championship won eleven matches and lost six to finish sixth.

Edward Gothard was in his second season as captain and took the wicket of Sir Donald Bradman at Derby. Under his leadership, the club maintained the form of the previous season. Charlie Elliott was top scorer but George Pope who played fewer matches was a close second and achieved the best batting average. C Gladwin took most wickets and again in a powerful all-rounder performance Pope came close second, although the Australians declared that only two bowlers in England moved the ball away from the bat as much as Les Jackson

There were no debut appearances for Derbyshire in 1948.

=== Matches ===
List of matches
No.	Date	V	Result	Margin	Notes
1	8 May 1948	Somerset; County Ground, Taunton	Won	4 wickets	D Smith 107; Lawrence 5-107
2	15 May 1948	Warwickshire; County Ground, Derby	Lost	7 wickets	Dollery 167; W H Copson 7-103; Pritchard 5-50; Hollies 6-64
3	19 May 1948	Hampshire; United Services Recreation Ground, Portsmouth	Drawn		G H Pope 207; AEG Rhodes 105; Dawson 110
4	22 May 1948	Kent; Garrison Stadium, Gillingham	Won	168 runs	Dovey 5-93; AEG Rhodes 6-58; Wright 6-48
5	26 May 1948	Northamptonshire; Queen's Park, Chesterfield	Won	Innings and 47 runs	C Gladwin 6-30; Nutter 6-47; G H Pope 5-44
6	29 May 1948	Glamorgan; County Ground, Derby	Won	301 runs	C Gladwin 5-55; G H Pope 7-34
7	2 Jun 1948	Middlesex; Lord's Cricket Ground, St John's Wood	Drawn		C Gladwin 5-40; Gray 5-75
8	5 Jun 1948	Somerset; Rutland Recreation Ground, Ilkeston	Won	11 runs	Tremlett 5-55; C Gladwin 5-40; Hazell 7-35; G H Pope 5-40
9	12 Jun 1948	Leicestershire; Bath Grounds, Ashby-de-la-Zouch	Won	141 runs	A E Alderman 114; Sperry 6-42; G H Pope 5-54; C Gladwin 8-56
10	19 Jun 1948	Lancashire; Park Road Ground, Buxton	Drawn		
11	26 Jun 1948	Yorkshire; Queen's Park, Chesterfield	Drawn		G H Pope 6-12; Wardle 8-87
12	30 Jun 1948	Sussex; Manor Sports Ground, Worthing	Lost	21 runs	Bartlett 141; A E Alderman 124; Comford 5-89 and 6-87; G H Pope 6-55
13	3 Jul 1948	Middlesex; County Ground, Derby	Lost	170 runs	Edrich 133; Compton 100*; Sims 6-58
14	7 Jul 1948	Gloucestershire; Queen's Park, Chesterfield	Won	2 wickets	G H Pope 125; C Gladwin 5-57
15	10 Jul 1948	Worcestershire; Chester Road North Ground, Kidderminster	Drawn		Outschoorn 100*
16	14 Jul 1948	Gloucestershire; Ashley Down Ground, Bristol	Won	87 runs	
17	17 Jul 1948	Sussex; Ind Coope Ground, Burton-on-Trent	Won	10 wickets	Landridge 107*; Oakes 5-69; G H Pope 8-38
18	21 Jul 1948	Essex; Castle Park Cricket Ground, Colchester	Lost	Innings and 44 runs	Avery 118; R Smith 112; T Smith 6-80
19	24 Jul 1948	Nottinghamshire; Rutland Recreation Ground, Ilkeston	Won	Innings and 33 runs	G H Pope 129; Butler 6-115; HL Jackson 6-70
20	28 Jul 1948	Australians; County Ground, Derby	Lost	Innings and 34 runs	Brown 140; McCool 6-77
21	31 Jul 1948	Warwickshire; Edgbaston, Birmingham	Drawn		
22	4 Aug 1948	Surrey; Queen's Park, Chesterfield	Lost	167 runs	Bedser 5-35 and 6-56
23	7 Aug 1948	Nottinghamshire; Trent Bridge, Nottingham	Lost	Innings and 45 runs	Simpson 129; D Smith 5-37; Winrow 5-18
24	11 Aug 1948	Yorkshire; North Marine Road Ground, Scarborough	Drawn		Watson 172; Wilson 140
25	14 Aug 1948	Leicestershire; Queen's Park, Chesterfield	Won	153 runs	Munden 5-48; AEG Rhodes 5-69; V Jackson 6-24; C Gladwin 6-34
26	18 Aug 1948	Essex; County Ground, Derby	Drawn		Dods 124; Avery 103; HL Jackson 5-88
27	21 Aug 1948	Lancashire; Old Trafford, Manchester	Drawn		Howard 145; A F Townsend 102

== Statistics ==
=== County Championship batting averages ===
Name	Matches	Inns	Runs	High score	Average	100s
G H Pope	21	33	1152	207*	38.40	3
CS Elliott	26	43	1277	91	32.74	0
A E Alderman	7	11	320	124	29.09	2
D Smith	23	36	977	107	27.13	1
A F Townsend	19	32	690	102*	23.79	1
FE Marsh	13	19	352	63	23.46	0
AC Revill	26	38	840	68	22.70	0
AEG Rhodes	26	39	732	105*	21.52	1
GO Dawkes	26	39	770	95	20.81	0
C Gladwin	24	34	475	54*	19.79	0
P Vaulkhard	7	12	178	58	16.18	0
DC Brooke-Taylor	10	17	209	42	12.29	0
EJ Gothard	23	32	282	50	11.28	0
W H Copson	9	9	82	19	10.25	0
JD Eggar	6	8	62	28	7.75	0
DB Carr	4	4	27	19	6.75	0
HL Jackson	16	22	35	7	2.69	0

=== County Championship bowling averages ===
Name	Balls	Runs	Wickets	BB	Average
C Gladwin	5423	1953	124	8–56	15.75
G H Pope	4189	1724	100	8–38	17.24
AEG Rhodes	3646	1889	66	6–58	28.62
HL Jackson	3153	1540	61	6–70	25.24
W H Copson	1401	551	28	7–103	19.67
EJ Gothard	596	378	9	2–24	42.00
D Smith	184	93	5	5–37	18.60
AC Revill	316	202	4	3–27	50.50
CS Elliott	42	16	1	1–4	16.00
FE Marsh	162	102	0		
DB Carr	132	99	0		

== Wicket Keepers ==
- George Dawkes Catches 61, Stumping 4

== See also ==
- Derbyshire County Cricket Club seasons
- 1948 English cricket season
