= Derbyshire County Cricket Club in 1953 =

59th season

Derbyshire County Cricket Club seasons
1953 season
- Captain: Guy Willatt
- County Championship: 6
- Most runs: Arnold Hamer
- Most wickets: Cliff Gladwin
- Most catches: George Dawkes

Derbyshire County Cricket Club in 1953 was the cricket season when the English club Derbyshire had been playing for eighty two years. It was their fifty-ninth season in the County Championship and they won nine matches and lost seven to finish sixth in the County Championship.

== 1953 season ==
Derbyshire played 28 games in the County Championship, one match against Oxford University and one match against the touring Australians. They won nine matches altogether. Guy Willatt was in his third year as captain. Charlie Elliott was top scorer and C Gladwin took most wickets with 121.

Reginald Carter made his debut and continued to play for three seasons. David Green also made his debut and played intermittently over several seasons.

=== Matches ===
List of matches
No.	Date	V	Result	Margin	Notes
1	13 May 1953	Middlesex; Lord's Cricket Ground, St John's Wood	Drawn		Sharp 107
2	16 May 1953	Glamorgan; Queen's Park, Chesterfield	Drawn		Jones 114; C Gladwin 5-75
3	20 May 1953	Somerset; County Ground, Taunton	Won	Innings and 21 runs	AC Revill 111; HL Jackson 5-51; Buse 5-61
4	23 May 1953	Warwickshire; Edgbaston, Birmingham	Lost	200 runs	Hollies 5-23
5	27 May 1953	Sussex; County Ground, Derby	Drawn		Langridge 127; AC Revill 107
6	30 May 1953	Worcestershire; Ind Coope Ground, Burton-on-Trent	Won	3 wickets	Jenkins 5-64; HL Jackson 5-35
7	03 Jun 1953	Surrey; Kennington Oval	Lost	8 wickets	Bedser 5-42; C Gladwin 8-50
8	06 Jun 1953	Glamorgan; Ynysangharad Park, Pontypridd	Lost	13 runs	HL Jackson 5-51; Wooller 5-66; C Gladwin 5-67
9	10 Jun 1953	Oxford University; The University Parks, Oxford	Drawn		
10	13 Jun 1953	Lancashire; Old Trafford, Manchester	Drawn		
11	17 Jun 1953	Australians; Queen's Park, Chesterfield	Drawn		C Gladwin 5-84; E Smith 5-36
12	20 Jun 1953	Surrey; County Ground, Derby	Won	Innings and 1 run	HL Jackson 5-34; C Gladwin 5-47
13	27 Jun 1953	Nottinghamshire; Rutland Recreation Ground, Ilkeston	Won	7 wickets	A Hamer 115
14	01 Jul 1953	Northamptonshire; Queen's Park, Chesterfield	Drawn		Barrick 161; CS Elliott 132; Brookes 116
15	04 Jul 1953	Nottinghamshire; Trent Bridge, Nottingham	Lost	10 wickets	Simpson 114; Stocks 140
16	08 Jul 1953	Kent; Queen's Park, Chesterfield	Drawn		AC Revill 128
17	11 Jul 1953	Leicestershire; Bath Grounds, Ashby-de-la-Zouch	Lost	41 runs	C Gladwin 6-30; V Jackson 5-23 and 5-34
18	15 Jul 1953	Middlesex; County Ground, Derby	Drawn		Sharp 103; Robertson 127; HL Jackson 5-44
19	18 Jul 1953	Yorkshire; Queen's Park, Chesterfield	Won	10 wickets	A Hamer 153; C Gladwin 5-44
20	22 Jul 1953	Worcestershire; Tipton Road, Dudley	Drawn		DB Carr 111
21	25 Jul 1953	Lancashire; Queen's Park, Chesterfield	Won	49 runs	Berry 6-58
22	01 Aug 1953	Warwickshire; County Ground, Derby	Drawn		Gardner 143
23	05 Aug 1953	Sussex; County Ground, Hove	Drawn		Suttle 103; Parks 124
24	08 Aug 1953	Northamptonshire; Wellingborough School Ground	Lost	3 wickets	
25	12 Aug 1953	Yorkshire; North Marine Road Ground, Scarborough	Lost	109 runs	Wardle 5-52; Holdsworth 6-58
26	15 Aug 1953	Leicestershire; County Ground, Derby	Won	10 wickets	Walsh 5-64; HL Jackson 5-36
27	19 Aug 1953	Somerset; Queen's Park, Chesterfield	Won	Innings and 82 runs	R Carter 7-46
28	22 Aug 1953	Essex; Park Road Ground, Buxton	Abandoned		
29	26 Aug 1953	Hampshire; County Ground, Southampton	Won	158 runs	C Gladwin 5-40; Knott 5-36
30	29 Aug 1953	Gloucestershire; Ashley Down Ground, Bristol	Drawn		DC Morgan 5-35; Graveney 5-28

== Statistics ==
=== County Championship batting averages ===
Name	Matches	Inns	Runs	High score	Average	100s
A Hamer	27	44	1486	153	35.38	2
AC Revill	27	41	1250	128	32.05	3
JM Kelly	27	43	1119	78	29.44	0
GL Willatt	26	40	1099	95	27.47	0
CS Elliott	23	35	685	132*	23.62	1
G Lowe	1	1	21	21	21.00	0
DC Morgan	25	37	633	83	20.41	0
DB Carr	27	42	759	111	19.97	1
C Gladwin	27	35	347	27*	16.52	0
R Sale	2	4	66	23	16.50	0
BH Richardson	2	4	58	29	14.50	0
R Carter	3	2	14	13	14.00	0
GO Dawkes	27	38	479	55	12.94	0
A Eato	8	8	75	22*	10.71	0
AEG Rhodes	3	5	48	40	9.60	0
E Smith	17	20	64	23*	6.40	0
DJ Green	3	3	18	8	6.00	0
HL Jackson	22	24	107	18*	5.94	0

=== County Championship bowling averages ===
Name	Balls	Runs	Wickets	BB	Average
C Gladwin	6162	2212	121	8-50	18.28
HL Jackson	4141	1466	96	5-34	15.27
DC Morgan	3422	1587	64	5-35	24.79
DB Carr	1429	780	23	4-28	33.91
E Smith	2497	921	22	3-15	41.86
A Eato	1054	520	16	4-62	32.50
R Carter	528	199	12	7-46	16.58
A Hamer	1134	530	11	2-18	48.18
AEG Rhodes	366	218	1	1-49	218.00
JM Kelly	18	3	0		
AC Revill	66	25	0		
BH Richardson	12	7	0		
GL Willatt	12	11	0		

== Wicket Keepers ==
- GO Dawkes Catches 46, Stumping 7

== See also ==
- Derbyshire County Cricket Club seasons
- 1953 English cricket season
