= Derbyshire County Cricket Club in 1957 =

1957 season of an English cricket team

Derbyshire County Cricket Club seasons
1957 season
- Captain: Donald Carr
- County Championship: 4
- Most runs: Arnold Hamer
- Most wickets: Les Jackson
- Most catches: George Dawkes

The 1957 season was the 86th season in which the English cricket club Derbyshire competed, and their 53rd season in the County Championship. They won eleven matches and lost nine to finish fourth in the Championship.

== 1957 season ==
Derbyshire played 28 games in the County Championship, and one match against Cambridge University, and one against the touring West Indians. They won ten matches in the Championship and the match against Cambridge University. Donald Carr was in his third season as captain. Arnold Hamer was top scorer and Les Jackson took most wickets with 129.

Newcomers in the season were Ian Gibson, Keith Mohan, and David Short. Gibson played for four seasons, Mohan for two and Short in 1957 and again in 1960.

=== Matches ===
List of matches
No.	Date	V	Result	Margin	Notes
1	4 May 1957	Yorkshire; Park Avenue Cricket Ground, Bradford	Lost	9 wickets	Close 108; Trueman 5-66
2	11 May 1957	Leicestershire; Aylestone Road, Leicester	Won	Innings and 132 runs	E Smith 6-19
3	18 May 1957	Essex; Ind Coope Ground, Burton-on-Trent	Won	Innings and 7 runs	C Gladwin 5-24; Bailey 7-61; HL Jackson 7-38
4	25 May 1957	Yorkshire; Queen's Park, Chesterfield	Won	84 runs	JM Kelly 106; Close 120; HL Jackson 5-51 and 6-63
5	29 May 1957	Sussex; County Ground, Derby	Won	197 runs	A Hamer 138
6	1 Jun 1957	Lancashire; Aigburth, Liverpool	Won	Innings and 66 runs	A Hamer 104; HL Jackson 5-63; DC Morgan 6-65
7	5 Jun 1957	Middlesex; Lord's Cricket Ground, St John's Wood	Won	163 runs	HL Jackson 6-37;
8	8 Jun 1957	Warwickshire; Edgbaston, Birmingham	Lost	9 wickets	Hollies 5-52 and 5-47
9	12 Jun 1957	Cambridge University; FP Fenner's Ground, Cambridge	Won	6 wickets	E Smith 6-66
10	15 Jun 1957	Worcestershire; County Ground, Derby	Drawn		Kenyon 175; Richardson 116; Berry 5-71
11	19 Jun 1957	Glamorgan; Queen's Park, Chesterfield	Drawn		Parkhouse 118; JM Kelly 109
12	22 Jun 1957	Somerset; Recreation Ground, Bath	Won	9 wickets	C Gladwin 5-29 and 8-57; Lobb 5-36
13	26 Jun 1957	Worcestershire; Tipton Road, Dudley	Lost	2 wickets	Richardson 169; A Hamer 134
14	29 Jun 1957	West Indies; Queen's Park, Chesterfield	Lost	173 runs	O Smith 133; Gilchrist 5-41
15	3 Jul 1957	Surrey; County Ground, Derby	Lost	8 wickets	Bedser 5-55
16	6 Jul 1957	Gloucestershire; Wagon Works Ground, Gloucester	Won	2 wickets	JM Kelly 113; HL Jackson 7-27; D Smith 5-31
17	10 Jul 1957	Surrey; Kennington Oval	Drawn		A Hamer 112
18	13 Jul 1957	Nottinghamshire; Trent Bridge, Nottingham	Drawn		Goonesena 7-75
19	17 Jul 1957	Middlesex; Queen's Park, Chesterfield	Won	Innings and 22 runs	C Gladwin 6-23 and 5-18
20	20 Jul 1957	Lancashire; County Ground, Derby	Drawn		
21	27 Jul 1957	Nottinghamshire; Rutland Recreation Ground, Ilkeston	Drawn		
22	31 Jul 1957	Leicestershire; Queen's Park, Chesterfield	Won	Innings and 123 runs	JM Kelly 127; DB Carr 141; HL Jackson 6-37
23	3 Aug 1957	Warwickshire; County Ground, Derby	Drawn		Horner 152; M Smith 104; Bannister 7-88
24	7 Aug 1957	Glamorgan; Ynysangharad Park, Pontypridd	Drawn		C Gladwin 5-45; McConnon 7-37
25	10 Aug 1957	Hampshire; United Services Recreation Ground, Portsmouth	Drawn		Gray 103
26	14 Aug 1957	Kent; County Ground, Derby	Lost	Innings and 50 runs	Ridgway 6-53
27	17 Aug 1957	Somerset; Queen's Park, Chesterfield	Lost	Innings and 21 runs	Wight 6-29
28	21 Aug 1957	Northamptonshire; County Ground, Northampton	Lost	135 runs	DB Carr 5-31; Manning 7-65; E Smith 5-77; Tribe 6-16
29	24 Aug 1957	Northamptonshire; Park Road Ground, Buxton	Drawn		
30	31 Aug 1957	Sussex; County Ground, Hove	Lost	4 runs	Lenham 130; Marlar 6-65 and 5-79; E Smith 5-97

== Statistics ==
=== County Championship batting averages ===
Name	Matches	Inns	Runs	High score	Average	100s
A Hamer	28	50	1593	138	32.51	4
JM Kelly	28	50	1483	127	32.23	4
DC Morgan	28	44	917	64*	28.65	0
HL Johnson	19	32	670	88*	27.91	0
DB Carr	27	44	1132	141	27.60	1
C Lee	28	50	1103	83	22.97	0
I Gibson	6	10	150	66*	21.42	0
AC Revill	23	40	757	86	19.41	0
GO Dawkes	28	44	736	75	19.36	0
KF Mohan	4	6	66	24*	13.20	0
C Gladwin	25	30	206	21	12.87	0
DJ Green	4	6	73	50	12.16	0
JD Short	3	5	49	22	9.80	0
E Smith	25	35	233	31*	8.96	0
HJ Rhodes	3	5	32	12	6.40	0
HL Jackson	27	29	89	24	3.42	0
D Hall	2	1	0	0*		0

=== County Championship bowling averages ===
Name	Balls	Runs	Wickets	BB	Average
HL Jackson	5668	2071	129	7-27	16.05
C Gladwin	5039	1793	99	8-57	18.11
DC Morgan	5106	2021	84	6-65	24.05
E Smith	4152	1806	68	6-19	26.55
DB Carr	1542	843	24	5-31	35.12
HJ Rhodes	437	211	8	3-11	26.37
AC Revill	442	248	6	2-43	41.33
D Hall	288	166	5	3-61	33.20
I Gibson	204	115	3	1-6	38.33
HL Johnson	55	41	1	1-1	41.00
C Lee	42	22	0		
KF Mohan	30	14	0		
A Hamer	12	13	0		
JM Kelly	6	5	0		

== Wicket Keepers ==
- GO Dawkes Catches 60, Stumping 4

== See also ==
- Derbyshire County Cricket Club seasons
- 1957 English cricket season
