= Derbyshire County Cricket Club in 1958 =

1958 season of an English cricket team

Derbyshire County Cricket Club seasons
1958 season
- Captain: Donald Carr
- County Championship: 5
- Most runs: Charles Lee
- Most wickets: Les Jackson
- Most catches: George Dawkes

Derbyshire County Cricket Club in 1958 represents the cricket season when the English club Derbyshire had been playing eighty-seven years. It was their fifty-fourth season in the County Championship and they won nine matches in the County Championship to finish fifth.

== 1958 season ==
Derbyshire played 28 games in the County Championship, one match against Oxford University, and one against the touring New Zealanders. They won ten matches altogether, and ended fifth in the County Championship. Donald Carr was in his fourth season as captain. Charles Lee was top scorer. Les Jackson took most wickets for Derbyshire and topped the national bowler list with 143 wickets. His bowling average of 10.99 has not been exceeded since. Hampshire's score of 23 in the match at the Ind Coope ground remains the record for lowest runs in a match against Derbyshire

The only new player was Jim Brailsford who made his three first-class career appearances for Derbyshire during the season.

=== Matches ===
List of matches
No.	Date	V	Result	Margin	Notes
1	10 May 1958	Oxford University; The University Parks, Oxford	Won	134 runs	HL Jackson 7-18; E Smith 6-70
2	14 May 1958	Glamorgan; County Ground, Derby	Drawn		Watkins 5-19; HJ Rhodes 5-35; McConnon 6-20
3	17 May 1958	Leicestershire; Queen's Park, Chesterfield	Lost	5 wickets	DC Morgan 6-36; Boshier 6-39
4	24 May 1958	Warwickshire; County Ground, Derby	Drawn		Gardner 122; HL Jackson 6-74
5	28 May 1958	Gloucestershire; Queen's Park, Chesterfield	Drawn		C Lee 150; HL Jackson 5-37
6	31 May 1958	Northamptonshire; County Ground, Northampton	Lost	48 runs	Manning 5-41
7	04 Jun 1958	Gloucestershire; Ashley Down Ground, Bristol	Lost	158 runs	Young 141; C Gladwin 7-28; Cook 7-19; DC Morgan 5-52; Mortimore 7-26
8	07 Jun 1958	Essex; Park Road Ground, Buxton	Drawn		Preston 5-36
9	11 Jun 1958	New Zealand cricket team in England in 1958; County Ground, Derby	Drawn		
10	14 Jun 1958	Worcestershire; Chester Road North Ground, Kidderminster	Lost	9 wickets	Outschoorn 113; HL Jackson 5-53; Flavell 7-43
11	21 Jun 1958	Surrey; Queen's Park, Chesterfield	Drawn		Laker 5-64
12	25 Jun 1958	Sussex; Central Recreation Ground, Hastings	Drawn		HL Jackson 5-28
13	28 Jun 1958	Glamorgan; St Helen's, Swansea	Won	5 wickets	C Gladwin 5-64
14	02 Jul 1958	Somerset; Recreation Ground, Bath	Lost	4 runs	Tremlett 118; C Gladwin 7-59
15	05 Jul 1958	Yorkshire; Queen's Park, Chesterfield	Drawn		DC Morgan 5-66
16	09 Jul 1958	Lancashire; County Ground, Derby	Lost	6 wickets	Statham 5-21
17	12 Jul 1958	Leicestershire; Bath Grounds, Ashby-de-la-Zouch	Won	Innings and 42 runs	HL Jackson 7-30 and 5-37
18	16 Jul 1958	Essex; Chalkwell Park, Westcliff-on-Sea	Won	2 wickets	HL Jackson 7-34; Bailey 8-29
19	19 Jul 1958	Nottinghamshire; Trent Bridge, Nottingham	Won	Innings and 88 runs	C Lee 147; HJ Rhodes 5-50; C Gladwin 5-35
20	26 Jul 1958	Nottinghamshire; Rutland Recreation Ground, Ilkeston	Won	Innings and 2 runs	C Gladwin 6-34 and 5-49; DC Morgan 5-10
21	30 Jul 1958	Middlesex; Queen's Park, Chesterfield	Drawn		Bennett 6-79
22	02 Aug 1958	Warwickshire; Edgbaston, Birmingham	Won	7 wickets	C Gladwin 5-15
23	06 Aug 1958	Kent; St Lawrence Ground, Canterbury	Lost	Innings and 8 runs	Leary 101; Sayer 5-28; HL Jackson 6-58
24	09 Aug 1958	Sussex; County Ground, Derby	Drawn		HL Jackson 6-61; Thomson 5-70
25	13 Aug 1958	Hampshire; Ind Coope Ground, Burton-on-Trent	Won	103 runs	Heath 6-25 and 7-52; HL Jackson 5-10
26	16 Aug 1958	Yorkshire; Headingley, Leeds	Lost	86 runs	E Smith 5-38; HL Jackson 7-53; Illingworth 5-51
27	20 Aug 1958	Worcestershire; Queen's Park, Chesterfield	Drawn		DB Carr 5-48
28	23 Aug 1958	Kent; County Ground, Derby	Won	132 runs	HL Jackson 5-33; C Gladwin 5-31
29	27 Aug 1958	Lancashire; Old Trafford, Manchester	Lost	6 wickets	HL Jackson 5-32; Statham 5-31
30	30 Aug 1958	Hampshire; Dean Park, Bournemouth	Won	5 wickets	HL Jackson 6-51 and 5-14

== Statistics ==
=== County Championship batting averages ===
Name	Matches	Inns	Runs	High score	Average	100s
C Lee	27	45	1307	150	29.04	2
A Hamer	27	46	1248	86	27.73	0
DC Morgan	28	47	1070	99	24.88	0
DB Carr	28	47	943	71	23.57	0
DJ Green	9	17	335	69*	20.93	0
HL Johnson	28	46	658	49	18.27	0
GO Dawkes	28	40	550	79	15.27	0
JM Kelly	22	35	495	63	14.14	0
E Smith	28	35	302	32*	10.41	0
C Gladwin	24	28	162	22	10.12	0
KF Mohan	6	11	97	49	9.70	0
FC Brailsford	3	5	41	14	8.20	0
G Wyatt	4	7	56	31	8.00	0
HJ Rhodes	23	30	195	48	7.50	0
HL Jackson	22	22	71	16	5.91	0
GA Beet	1	1	0	0*	0	0

=== County Championship bowling averages ===
Name	Balls	Runs	Wickets	BB	Average
HL Jackson	4328	1311	126	7-30	10.40
C Gladwin	4690	1720	110	7-28	15.63
HJ Rhodes	3172	1259	67	5-35	18.79
DC Morgan	3377	1180	64	6-36	18.43
E Smith	3483	1402	46	5-38	30.47
DB Carr	875	466	20	5-48	23.30
A Hamer	30	16	2	2-13	8.00
FC Brailsford	12	2	1	1-2	2.00
C Lee	80	45	1	1-22	45.00
HL Johnson	55	38	0		
JM Kelly	18	9	0		
KF Mohan	12	9	0		
DJ Green	6	0	0		
G Wyatt	6	2	0		

== Wicket Keepers ==
- GO Dawkes Catches 60, Stumpings 4

== See also ==
- Derbyshire County Cricket Club seasons
- 1958 English cricket season
