= Derbyshire County Cricket Club in 1954 =

1954 season of an English cricket team

Derbyshire County Cricket Club seasons
1954 season
- Captain: Guy Willatt
- County Championship: 3
- Most runs: Arnold Hamer
- Most wickets: Cliff Gladwin
- Most catches: George Dawkes

Derbyshire County Cricket Club in 1954 was the cricket season when the English club Derbyshire had been playing for eighty-four years. It was their fiftieth season in the County Championship and they won eleven matches in the County Championship to finish in third place.

== 1954 season ==
Derbyshire played 28 games in the County Championship, one match against Scotland, and one against the touring Pakistanis. In a successful season, they won twelve first class matches altogether. Guy Willatt was in his fourth season as captain. Arnold Hamer was top scorer and Cliff Gladwin took most wickets.

Two players made their debut in the season. Gerald Wyatt played one game and then appeared intermittently over the next few years. Charles Lee went on to score over 12,000 runs and became captain ten years later.

=== Matches ===
List of matches
No.	Date	V	Result	Margin	Notes
1	8 May 1954	Leicestershire; County Ground, Derby	Won	7 wickets	Tompkin 112; Spencer 6-64; HL Jackson 6-43
2	12 May 1954	Kent; Bat and Ball Ground, Gravesend	Won	81 runs	Wright 7/62; GL Willatt 103; Evans 109; E Smith 6-60; C Gladwin 5-22
3	15 May 1954	Essex; Chalkwell Park, Westcliff-on-Sea	Won	5 wickets	Horsfall 117; A Hamer 104; C Gladwin 5-79
4	19 May 1954	Hampshire; County Ground, Southampton	Lost	4 wickets	Dare 5-49; E Smith 5-44
5	22 May 1954	Essex; Queen's Park, Chesterfield	Lost	6 wickets	C Gladwin 8-50
6	29 May 1954	Lancashire; Old Trafford, Manchester	Drawn		Hilton 7-51
7	2 Jun 1954	Scotland; Park Road Ground, Buxton	Won	5 wickets	Cosh 99; Youngson 6-84;
8	5 Jun 1954	Warwickshire; County Ground, Derby	Drawn		Bannister 5-99
9	12 Jun 1954	Yorkshire; Queen's Park, Chesterfield	Drawn		Lester 121; Appleyard 6-71; E Smith 5-37
10	16 Jun 1954	Surrey; County Ground, Derby	Lost	10 wickets	C Gladwin 6-75; Bedser 5-22
11	19 Jun 1954	Glamorgan; Cardiff Arms Park	Won	5 runs	Hedges 103; Jones 104; Shepherd 5-45; HL Jackson 6-24; C Gladwin 8-114
12	26 Jun 1954	Lancashire; Park Road Ground, Buxton	Won	169 runs	HL Jackson 6-33
13	30 Jun 1954	Kent; Queen's Park, Chesterfield	Won	7 wickets	HL Jackson 6-40
14	3 Jul 1954	Sussex; Cricket Field Road Ground, Horsham	Won	76 runs	James 5-31; HL Jackson 5-30
15	7 Jul 1954	Pakistan; County Ground, Derby	Drawn		AC Revill 101; Ahmed 5-53; DC Morgan 5-57
16	10 Jul 1954	Somerset; Johnson Park, Yeovil	Won	10 wickets	Tremlett 5-31; HL Jackson 5-17
17	14 Jul 1954	Hampshire; Ind Coope Ground, Burton-on-Trent	Drawn		Harrison 114; JM Kelly 116; GO Dawkes 143; HL Jackson 7-64; Cannings 7-132
18	17 Jul 1954	Worcestershire; County Ground, New Road, Worcester	Lost	4 wickets	
19	21 Jul 1954	Sussex; County Ground, Derby	Drawn		A Hamer 118; GL Willatt 101
20	24 Jul 1954	Nottinghamshire; Rutland Recreation Ground, Ilkeston	Drawn		C Gladwin 6-114
21	28 Jul 1954	Yorkshire; Headingley, Leeds	Won	6 wickets	A Hamer 147; Trueman 6-109; DC Morgan 5-23 and 5-55
22	31 Jul 1954	Warwickshire; Edgbaston, Birmingham	Drawn		HL Jackson 5-28
23	4 Aug 1954	Gloucestershire; Queen's Park, Chesterfield	Lost	60 runs	Graveney 222; McHugh 5-82; E Smith 5-42
24	7 Aug 1954	Northamptonshire; Wellingborough School Ground	Drawn		
25	11 Aug 1954	Gloucestershire; College Ground, Cheltenham	Won	Innings and 52 runs	C Gladwin 5-24
26	14 Aug 1954	Worcestershire; County Ground, Derby	Won	9 wickets	Flavell 5-53
27	18 Aug 1954	Middlesex; Queen's Park, Chesterfield	Drawn		
28	21 Aug 1954	Nottinghamshire; Trent Bridge, Nottingham	Drawn		
29	25 Aug 1954	Leicestershire; Grace Road, Leicester	Drawn		Walsh 5-65
30	28 Aug 1954	Glamorgan; Queen's Park, Chesterfield	Lost	10 wickets	Wooller 5-45; Watkins 7-28

== Statistics ==
=== County Championship batting averages ===
Name	Matches	Inns	Runs	High score	Average	100s
A Hamer	28	46	1445	147*	34.40	3
GL Willatt	28	43	1115	103	27.87	2
C Lee	3	5	108	61	27.00	0
JM Kelly	28	46	1086	116	24.68	1
AEG Rhodes	3	3	72	46	24.00	0
AC Revill	28	43	971	90	22.58	0
DB Carr	28	44	832	86	22.48	0
GO Dawkes	28	41	788	143	21.88	1
DC Morgan	25	34	630	75	20.32	0
C Gladwin	28	35	368	40	16.00	0
JD Eggar	2	2	25	21	12.50	0
A Eato	5	7	55	23*	11.00	0
DJ Green	6	8	66	25	9.42	0
R Sale	2	3	27	16	9.00	0
HL Jackson	28	29	151	26*	7.94	0
E Smith	28	31	155	22	7.75	0
G Wyatt	1	2	6	3*	6.00	0
R Carter	9	12	49	12	4.90	0

=== County Championship bowling averages ===
Name	Balls	Runs	Wickets	BB	Average
C Gladwin	6318	2175	131	8-50	16.60
HL Jackson	5448	1786	120	7-64	14.88
E Smith	3277	1294	64	6-60	20.21
DC Morgan	3250	1191	56	5-23	21.26
A Eato	474	158	12	4-18	13.16
A Hamer	400	211	10	3-27	21.10
R Carter	552	282	9	2-27	31.33
DB Carr	445	239	3	1-17	79.66
GL Willatt	37	36	1	1-2	36.00
AC Revill	114	56	0		
JM Kelly	60	36	0		
DJ Green	12	1	0		
JD Eggar	12	4	0		

== Wicket Keepers ==
- George Dawkes Catches 51, Stumping 9

== See also ==
- Derbyshire County Cricket Club seasons
- 1954 English cricket season
