= Derbyshire County Cricket Club in 1956 =

1956 season of an English cricket team

Derbyshire County Cricket Club seasons
1956 season
- Captain: Donald Carr
- County Championship: 12
- Most runs: Charles Lee
- Most wickets: Les Jackson

Derbyshire County Cricket Club in 1956 represents cricket season when the English club Derbyshire had been playing for eighty five years. It was their fifty-second season in the County Championship and they won seven matches and lost seven to finish twelfth in the County Championship.

== 1956 season ==
Derbyshire played 28 games in the County Championship, and one match against Oxford University, and one against the touring Australians. They won seven matches altogether, but a large number of matches were drawn. Donald Carr was in his third season as captain. Charles Lee was top scorer and Les Jackson took most wickets with 114.

The club retained a virtually unchanged squad with only one newcomer – Gordon Beet who had played in the second XI in the previous year and made occasional first class appearances subsequently.

=== Matches ===
List of matches
No.	Date	V	Result	Margin	Notes
1	5 May 1956	Surrey; Kennington Oval	Drawn		C Gladwin 5–43 and 8–64
2	16 May 1956	Middlesex; Lord's Cricket Ground, St John's Wood	Won	88 runs	JM Kelly 131; HL Jackson 5–68 and 7–48
3	19 May 1956	Warwickshire; County Ground, Derby	Drawn		
4	23 May 1956	Middlesex; Queen's Park, Chesterfield	Lost	Innings and 41 runs	Edrich 208; Moss 6–71 and 5–53
5	26 May 1956	Somerset; Johnson Park, Yeovil	Lost	6 wickets	McMahon 5–45; McCool 5–43
6	30 May 1956	Kent; Bat and Ball Ground, Gravesend	Won	7 wickets	HL Jackson 6–54
7	2 Jun 1956	Yorkshire; Queen's Park, Chesterfield	Won	6 runs	Appleyard 6–37 and 6–69; HL Jackson 5–26; HJ Rhodes 5–52
8	6 Jun 1956	Lancashire; Park Road Ground, Buxton	Drawn		Pullar 104; Tattersall 6–57
9	9 Jun 1956	Glamorgan; St Helen's, Swansea	Won	8 wickets	A Hamer 120; E Smith 7–58; Shepherd 7–111
10	13 Jun 1956	Oxford University; The University Parks, Oxford	Drawn		Kentish 5–49
11	16 Jun 1956	Glamorgan; Queen's Park, Chesterfield	Abandoned		
12	23 Jun 1956	Yorkshire; Headingley, Leeds	Drawn		JM Kelly 104; HL Jackson 7–55
13	27 Jun 1956	Northamptonshire; County Ground, Derby	Drawn		
14	30 Jun 1956	Leicestershire; Ind Coope Ground, Burton-on-Trent	Won	Innings and 26 runs	C Lee 116
15	4 Jul 1956	Lancashire; Old Trafford, Manchester	Drawn		Greenhough 6–64; C Gladwin 5–25
16	7 Jul 1956	Leicestershire; Bath Grounds, Ashby-de-la-Zouch	Won	145 runs	DB Carr 123; Palmer 104; HL Jackson 7–41
17	11 Jul 1956	Sussex; County Ground, Derby	Drawn		HL Jackson 6–87
18	14 Jul 1956	Hampshire; Queen's Park, Chesterfield	Drawn		
19	18 Jul 1956	Essex; Castle Park Cricket Ground, Colchester	Drawn		HL Jackson 5–69
20	21 Jul 1956	Somerset; County Ground, Derby	Won	111 runs	A Hamer 104; C Gladwin 7–57; E Smith 6–52
21	25 Jul 1956	Worcestershire; Tipton Road, Dudley	Lost	10 wickets	Kenyon 147; Jenkins 5–62 and 6–50
22	28 Jul 1956	Nottinghamshire; Rutland Recreation Ground, Ilkeston	Drawn		A Hamer 119; Jepson 6–42
23	1 Aug 1956	Worcestershire; Queen's Park, Chesterfield	Drawn		8 overs played
24	4 Aug 1956	Warwickshire; Edgbaston, Birmingham	Lost	133 runs	Hollies 7–40
25	8 Aug 1956	Nottinghamshire; Trent Bridge, Nottingham	Lost	4 wickets	Goonesena 5–52 and 6–49; DC Morgan 5–50
26	11 Aug 1956	Australians; County Ground, Derby	Lost	57 runs	Lindwall 7–40; Miller 5–29
27	15 Aug 1956	Northamptonshire; Wellingborough School Ground	Drawn		Tyson 7–46
28	18 Aug 1956	Sussex; The Saffrons, Eastbourne	Lost	6 wickets	C Gladwin 6–74; Oakman 6–36
29	22 Aug 1956	Surrey; County Ground, Derby	Drawn		Stewart 100; Loader 6–70
30	25 Aug 1956 County	Gloucestershire; Queen's Park, Chesterfield	Drawn		C Gladwin 5–42

== Statistics ==
=== County Championship batting averages ===
Name	Matches	Inns	Runs	High score	Average	100s
C Lee	27	47	1407	116	32.72	1
A Hamer	25	43	1271	120	31.77	3
GO Dawkes	27	40	857	81	26.78	0
JM Kelly	25	40	1016	131	27.45	2
DB Carr	23	36	887	123	26.08	1
AC Revill	21	37	740	72	23.12	0
HL Johnson	25	36	685	83	20.75	0
DC Morgan	23	31	469	51	19.54	0
GL Willatt	4	6	97	49	19.40	0
C Gladwin	27	32	303	31	12.62	0
E Smith	27	37	330	41	11.37	0
HJ Rhodes	3	5	47	19	9.40	0
DJ Green	2	4	27	11	6.75	0
HL Jackson	27	29	106	23*	5.04	0
GA Beet	2	1	4	4	4.00	0
JB Furniss	2	3	7	6	2.33	0
D Hall	7	8	3	3*	0.75	0

=== County Championship bowling averages ===
Name	Balls	Runs	Wickets	BB	Average
HL Jackson	5188	2000	114	7–41	17.54
C Gladwin	5299	1941	101	8–64	19.21
E Smith	3431	1475	54	7–58	27.31
DC Morgan	2556	1030	35	5–50	29.42
DB Carr	1243	681	21	3–28	32.42
HJ Rhodes	449	165	10	5–52	16.50
D Hall	680	323	8	3–61	40.37
JB Furniss	162	102	4	3–52	25.50
A Hamer	222	80	1	1–5	80.00
GA Beet	96	58	1	1–58	58.00
GL Willatt	6	5	0		
HL Johnson	6	4	0		
JM Kelly	18	9	0		
C Lee	12	4	0		
AC Revill	48	47	0		
GO Dawkes	10	6	0		

== Wicket Keepers ==
- GO Dawkes Catches 41, Stumping 6

== See also ==
- Derbyshire County Cricket Club seasons
- 1956 English cricket season
