= Derbyshire County Cricket Club in 1949 =

1949 season of an English cricket team

Derbyshire County Cricket Club seasons
1949 season
- Captain: David Skinner
- County Championship: 15
- Most runs: Charlie Elliott
- Most wickets: Cliff Gladwin
- Most catches: George Dawkes

Derbyshire County Cricket Club in 1949 represents the cricket season when the English club Derbyshire had been playing for seventy-eight years. It was their forty-fifth season in the County Championship and they won six matches in the County Championship to finish in fifteenth place.

== 1949 season ==
Derbyshire played 26 matches in the County Championship and one against the touring New Zealanders. DA Skinner was captain. Charlie Elliott scored most runs, and Cliff Gladwin took most wickets with 110 in the Championship.

Laurie Johnson, who went on to become a major performer for the county, made his debut in 1949 while fellow West Indian Michael Frederick also made his debut, but only took part in two first class matches. Dick Sale and Tom Hall played in their first of several seasons for the club, as did George Lowe although he appeared intermittently. Joseph Rimmer and Maurice Snape made their only appearances for Derbyshire in two matches in the season, while Kenneth Shearwood appeared once as a stop-gap wicket-keeper.

=== Matches ===
List of matches
No.	Date	V	Result	Margin	Notes
1	14 May 1949	Somerset; County Ground, Derby	Won	10 wickets	AEG Rhodes 5–49;
2	21 May 1949	Leicestershire; Bath Grounds, Ashby-de-la-Zouch	Won	153 runs	AC Revill 156; Symington 5–45; C Gladwin 5–28; Walsh 5–105
3	25 May 1949	Surrey; Kennington Oval	Lost	Innings and 182 runs	Squires 210; Bedser 6–25
4	28 May 1949	Yorkshire; Queen's Park, Chesterfield	Lost	114 runs	Coxon 6–36
5	01 Jun 1949	Sussex; Rutland Recreation Ground, Ilkeston	Drawn		John Langridge 234
6	04 Jun 1949	Warwickshire; Edgbaston, Birmingham	Lost	1 wicket	Dollery 100
7	08 Jun 1949	Leicestershire; County Ground, Derby	Drawn		Berry 149; Prentice 117; HL Jackson 7–51
8	11 Jun 1949	Worcestershire; Queen's Park, Chesterfield	Lost	100 runs	Howorth 6–57; C Gladwin 8–72
9	18 Jun 1949	Gloucestershire; Ashley Down Ground, Bristol	Lost	Innings and 1 run	Goddard 6–46 and 9–61; AEG Rhodes 7–114
10	22 Jun 1949	Kent; Queen's Park, Chesterfield	Lost	116 runs	C Gladwin 5–41
11	25 Jun 1949	Lancashire; Park Road Ground, Buxton	Won	110 runs	HL Jackson 6–52; Tattersall 6–39
12	29 Jun 1949	Essex; Chalkwell Park, Westcliff-on-Sea	Won	8 wickets	Pearce 111; C Gladwin 5–36 and 5–52; Price 5–47; W H Copson 5–43
13	02 Jul 1949	Sussex; Manor Sports Ground, Worthing	Drawn		John Langridge 146 and 146
14	06 Jul 1949	Hampshire; Queen's Park, Chesterfield	Lost	10 wickets	Carty 5–43; Shackleton 7–90
15	09 Jul 1949	New Zealand	Lost	7 wickets	AC Revill 145; Burke 6–23
16	16 Jul 1949	Glamorgan; Cardiff Arms Park	Lost	6 wickets	Clift 125; HL Jackson 5–16; Muncer 5–68
17	20 Jul 1949	Somerset; County Ground, Taunton	Won	Innings and 146 runs	AEG Rhodes 127; Hazell 7–112; W H Copson 5–34; HL Jackson 6–43
18	23 Jul 1949	Nottinghamshire; Rutland Recreation Ground, Ilkeston	Drawn		Keeton 101; AEG Rhodes 126; Butler 5–56
19	30 Jul 1949	Warwickshire; County Ground, Derby	Drawn		
20	03 Aug 1949	Gloucestershire; Queen's Park, Chesterfield	Lost	184 runs	C Gladwin 5–53; Cook 5–40; DB Carr 6–111; Graveney 10–66
21	06 Aug 1949	Lancashire; Old Trafford, Manchester	Drawn		R Sale 146; C Gladwin 5–105
22	10 Aug 1949	Northamptonshire; County Ground, Northampton	Lost	Innings and 80 runs	Jakeman 160; HL Jackson 5–99
23	13 Aug 1949	Yorkshire; Park Avenue Cricket Ground, Bradford	Lost	6 wickets	Ted Lester 140; JD Eggar 219; Coxon 5–48
24	17 Aug 1949	Middlesex; County Ground, Derby	Lost	Innings and 95 runs	Sims 5–105
25	20 Aug 1949	Nottinghamshire; Trent Bridge, Nottingham	Drawn		C Gladwin 125; Poole 122; Harvey 7–105
126	24 Aug 1949	Middlesex; Lord's Cricket Ground, St John's Wood	Lost	3 wickets	Young 5–80; Warr 5–36
27	27 Aug 1949	Essex; Ind Coope Ground, Burton-on-Trent	Won	Innings and 149 runs	W H Copson 5–23; C Gladwin 5–28

== Statistics ==
=== County Championship batting averages ===
Name	Matches	Inns	Runs	High score	Average	100s
JD Eggar	7	14	501	219	41.75	1
MC Frederick	2	3	98	84	32.66	0
AC Revill	22	39	1114	156*	31.82	1
WEG Payton	2	4	93	35*	31.00	0
CS Elliott	26	48	1372	95	29.82	0
C Gladwin	24	41	903	124*	29.12	1
D Smith	21	35	955	89	28.93	0
AEG Rhodes	26	44	1140	127	26.51	2
HL Johnson	11	18	444	77	26.11	0
R Sale	6	12	273	146	22.75	1
DB Carr	8	14	313	72	22.35	0
GO Dawkes	25	39	601	88	19.38	0
FE Marsh	14	24	430	71	18.69	0
DA Skinner	21	33	441	63	13.78	0
A F Townsend	10	20	233	41	12.26	0
G Lowe	1	2	22	22	11.00	0
W H Copson	25	38	207	28	6.67	0
P Vaulkhard	3	4	21	13	5.25	0
HL Jackson	23	37	120	24	4.80	0
T R Armstrong	1	2	4	4*	4.00	0
DC Brooke-Taylor	2	3	11	4	3.66	0
KA Shearwood	1	2	6	4	3.00	0
TA Hall	1	1	0	0	0.00	0
J Rimmer	2	1	0	0*	0	
MD Snape	2	3	0	0*	0.00	0

=== County Championship bowling averages ===
Name	Balls	Runs	Wickets	BB	Average
C Gladwin	5496	2210	110	8–72	20.09
HL Jackson	4985	2017	98	7–51	20.58
AEG Rhodes	4681	2462	65	7–114	37.87
W H Copson	3650	1686	63	5–23	26.76
DB Carr	404	248	8	6–111	31.00
HL Johnson	498	297	4	3–63	74.25
J Rimmer	261	175	4	2–71	43.75
FE Marsh	732	320	3	1–7	106.66
T R Armstrong	108	34	3	2–15	11.33
DA Skinner	234	182	2	1–41	91.00
TA Hall	90	55	0		
D Smith	25	12	0		
AC Revill	24	11	0		
A F Townsend	24	9	0		
CS Elliott	6	0	0		

== Wicket Keepers ==
- GO Dawkes Catches 60, Stumping 6
- KA Shearwood Catches 0, Stumping 1

== See also ==
- Derbyshire County Cricket Club seasons
- 1949 English cricket season
