= Harold Rhodes (cricketer) =

English cricketer

Personal information
- Full name: Harold James Rhodes
- Born: 22 July 1936 (age 90); Hadfield, Derbyshire, England
- Batting: Right-handed
- Bowling: Right-arm fast
- Relatives: Dusty Rhodes (father)

International information
- National side: England
- Test debut (cap 397): 2 July 1959 v India
- Last Test: 23 July 1959 v India

Domestic team information
- Years: Team
- 1953–1969: Derbyshire
- 1970–1973: Nottinghamshire
- 1975: Derbyshire

Career statistics
Competition	Test	FC	LA
Matches	2	322	57
Runs scored	0	2,427	124
Batting average	–	9.48	9.53
100s/50s	0/0	0/0	0/0
Top score	0 not out	48	26*
Balls bowled	449	55,536	3,086
Wickets	9	1,073	71
Bowling average	27.11	19.70	23.52
5 wickets in innings	0	42	0
10 wickets in match	0	4	0
Best bowling	4/50	7/38	4/18
Catches/stumpings	0/–	86/–	4/–
- Source: CricketArchive, 19 December 2021

Harold James Rhodes (born 22 July 1936) is an English former international cricketer who played two Test matches for England in 1959. He played domestically for Derbyshire between 1953 and 1975 and played one day matches for Nottinghamshire between 1970 and 1973.

== Life and career ==
Rhodes was born at Hadfield, Derbyshire, the son of the Derbyshire all-rounder, Albert "Dusty" Rhodes. He made his first appearance for Derbyshire Club and Ground in 1951 and played one match for the Derbyshire second eleven in 1952. He made his first-class debut for Derbyshire in the 1953 season when he played a single match against Oxford University, but began appearing regularly in the second eleven. Although his father played for the Derbyshire in 1953, they never played in the same first-class match. Rhodes was initially an off spin bowler. He played a single first-class fixture against Scotland in the 1954 season and played four first-class matches in the 1955 season. In the 1956 season he played four matches and took his first five wicket innings against Yorkshire. He played three matches in the 1957 season. He developed to become a fast seam bowler. In the 1958 season he played a full first-class season taking 67 wickets and two five wicket innings. He began opening the county bowling with Les Jackson in the 1959 season after the retirement of Cliff Gladwin. In that season, he played two Tests against India, taking nine wickets. He took 60 wickets for Derbyshire but with one five wicket over.

Although facing strong competition from bowlers such as Brian Statham and Fred Trueman, Rhodes might have expected to play many more Tests. But doubts about the legality of his bowling action emerged, and in the 1960 season, playing for Derbyshire against the South Africans, he was "called" for throwing – bowling the ball with a bent arm that straightens in the delivery – by the umpire and former Test batsman, Paul Gibb. Later in the 1960 season, he was no-balled again by Gibb, and by Syd Buller. He took 78 first-class wickets in the season and took two five wicket innings.

Rhodes was then subjected to a long and detailed examination of his action by MCC committees; he was eventually cleared in 1968 when it was declared that he had a "hyper-extended arm". But by then, his Test career was long gone, although he had continued to bowl successfully for Derbyshire across the 1960s. In the 1961 season he topped Derbyshire's bowling with 101 and took six five wicket innings. Against Oxford University he achieved a hat-trick that year. He took 68 wickets in the 1962 season and took five five wicket innings. His best season of 1965, saw him take 119 wickets at the low average of 11.04 runs per wicket, and he was top of the English national bowling averages for that season.

Rhodes retired to League cricket in 1969. He then played some one-day matches for Nottinghamshire between 1970 and 1973, and he returned to Derbyshire in 1975, for some one day matches, and a final first-class game against Oxford University. Rhodes finished with nine Test wickets and 1073 first-class wickets at an average of 19.50 and with a best performance of 7 for 38. He was a right-handed batsman and played 399 innings in 322 first-class matches with an average of 9.48 and a top score of 48. He scored no runs in two Test cricket matches.

After the conclusion of his playing career, Rhodes took up coaching. He served as part-time coach of the German national team between 1996 and 2001, including at the 2001 ICC Trophy in Canada.
