= Derek Hall (cricketer) =

English cricketer (1932–1983)

Personal information
- Full name: Derek Hall
- Born: 21 February 1932; Bolsover, England
- Died: 13 March 1983 (aged 51); San Jose, California, USA
- Batting: Right-handed
- Bowling: Right-arm fast-medium

Domestic team information
- Years: Team
- 1955–1958: Derbyshire
- FC debut: 13 July 1955 Derbyshire v Nottinghamshire
- Last FC: 10 May 1958 Derbyshire v Oxford University

Career statistics
Competition	First-class
Matches	20
Runs scored	43
Batting average	3.30
100s/50s	0/0
Top score	10*
Balls bowled	2,808
Wickets	48
Bowling average	28.97
5 wickets in innings	0
10 wickets in match	0
Best bowling	4/57
Catches/stumpings	6/–
- Source: CricketArchive, 18 April 2011

Derek Hall (21 February 1932 – 13 March 1983) was an English first-class cricketer who played for Derbyshire between 1955 and 1958.

Hall was born in Bolsover, Derbyshire, and made an early appearance for Derbyshire Club and Ground in 1951 followed by second XI appearances in 1954. He made his debut first-class appearance for Derbyshire in the 1955 season against Nottinghamshire. In the same innings as team-mate Arnold Hamer made a double-century. He appeared frequently throughout the rest of the season and in the 1956 season. He played three first-class matches in the 1957 season and one in the 1958 season when he achieved his top score of 10 not out. He continued playing in Minor County and Second Eleven championship games for Derbyshire until 1959.

Hall was a right-arm medium-fast bowler and took 48 first-class wickets at an average of 28.87 and a best performance of 4 for 57. He was a right-handed batsman and played 29 innings in 20 first-class matches with an average of 3.30 and a top score of 10 not out.

Hall moved to the United States later in life and died in San Jose, California at the age of 51. According to his obituary in Wisden and the Cricketer magazine, he was killed in a car crash in Canada.
