= Gerald Wyatt =

English cricketer

Personal information
- Born: 4 June 1933; New Mills, Derbyshire, England
- Died: 19 June 2001 (aged 68); Stockport, Cheshire, England
- Batting: Right-handed
- Role: Wicket-keeper

Domestic team information
- Years: Team
- 1954–1960: Derbyshire
- FC debut: 16 June 1954 Derbyshire v Surrey
- Last FC: 25 May 1960 Derbyshire v Oxford University

Career statistics
Competition	First-class
Matches	11
Runs scored	184
Batting average	11.50
100s/50s	0/1
Top score	59
Balls bowled	6
Wickets	0
Bowling average	–
5 wickets in innings	–
10 wickets in match	–
Best bowling	–
Catches/stumpings	7/–
- Source: CricketArchive, 16 April 2011

Gerald Wyatt (4 June 1933 – 19 June 2001) was an English cricketer who played for Derbyshire on various occasions between 1954 and 1960.

Wyatt was born in New Mills, Derbyshire. He joined Derbyshire and began playing in the Second XI in 1950. He made his first-class debut for Derbyshire in the 1954 season in June when he kept wicket in the match while regular keeper George Dawkes was injured. He made four first-class appearances in the 1955 season, making a top score of 31 runs. He made no first-class cricketing appearances for three seasons when he played regularly in the Second XI. He returned to the Derbyshire first team in the 1958 season when he batted in nine innings, and scored his only first-class half-century, against Oxford University. He played no further Second XI cricket beyond this point, and played just a single first-class match in the 1960 season against Oxford University when he did not score in either innings.

Wyatt was wicket-keeper and a right-handed batsman and averaged 11.50 from 20 first-class innings.

Wyatt died in Stockport at the age of 68.
