= Vaulkhard =

Vaulkhard is a surname. Notable people with the surname include:

- Harry Vaulkhard (born 1985), English racing driver
- Pat Vaulkhard (1911–1995), English cricketer
