= Alwyn Eato =

English cricketer (1929–2008)

Personal information
- Full name: Alwyn Eato
- Born: 13 February 1929; Duckmanton, Derbyshire, England
- Died: 19 September 2008 (aged 79); Oxford, England
- Batting: Right-handed
- Bowling: Right-arm medium-fast

Domestic team information
- Years: Team
- 1950–1955: Derbyshire
- FC debut: 7 June 1950 Derbyshire v Worcestershire
- Last FC: 9 July 1955 Derbyshire v Leicestershire

Career statistics
Competition	First-class
Matches	25
Runs scored	220
Batting average	9.56
100s/50s	0/0
Top score	44
Balls bowled	3,039
Wickets	50
Bowling average	28.58
5 wickets in innings	1
10 wickets in match	0
Best bowling	5/14
Catches/stumpings	7/–
- Source: CricketArchive, 23 April 2011

Alwyn Eato (13 February 1929 – 19 September 2008), born Alwyne Eato, was an English cricketer who played first-class cricket for Derbyshire between 1950 and 1955.

Eato was born in Duckmanton, Derbyshire. He was a Ferguson engineer in full-time occupation. He joined Derbyshire in the 1950 season and played part-time in the first and second elevens over the next eight years. He made his first-class debut for Derbyshire in June 1950. He played seven matches in the 1951 season and took a five-wicket innings against Leicestershire that year. He did National Service in 1952 and during the year played for the Army and the Royal Engineers. He rejoined Derbyshire in the 1953 season, in which he played eight matches. He played seven first-class games in the 1954 season and two in the 1955 season. His last second eleven game was in 1957.

Eato was right-arm medium-fast bowler and took 50 first-class wickets at an average of 28.58 and a best performance of 5–14. He was a right-handed batsman and played 28 innings in 25 first-class matches with an average of 9.56 and a top score of 44.

Eato died at Oxford at the age of 79.
