= Jonathan Willatt =

English cricketer

Personal information
- Full name: Jonathan Myles Gardiner Willatt
- Born: 8 July 1961 (age 65); Kendal, Westmorland, England
- Batting: Left-handed
- Relatives: Guy Willatt (father)

Domestic team information
- Years: Team
- 1989: Cambridge University

Career statistics
Competition	First-class
Matches	9
Runs scored	172
Batting average	13.23
100s/50s	–/–
Top score	45
Catches/stumpings	1/–
- Source: Cricinfo, 15 January 2022

Jonathan Myles Gardiner Willatt (born 8 July 1961) is an English former first-class cricketer.

The son of the cricketer Guy Willatt, he was born at Kendal in July 1961. He was educated at Repton School, before going up St Catharine's College, Cambridge. While studying at Cambridge, he played first-class cricket for Cambridge University Cricket Club in 1989, making five appearances. Playing as an opening batsman in the Cambridge side, we scored 172 runs at an average of 13.23, with a highest score of 45.
