= Bertram Richardson =

English cricketer (1932–2020)

Personal information
- Full name: Bertram Harold Richardson
- Born: 12 March 1932; Ashton-under-Lyne, Lancashire, England
- Died: 24 September 2020 (aged 88)
- Batting: Left-handed
- Bowling: Slow left-arm orthodox

Domestic team information
- Years: Team
- 1950–1953: Derbyshire
- FC debut: 21 June 1950 Derbyshire v Glamorgan
- Last FC: 10 June 1953 Derbyshire v Oxford University

Career statistics
Competition	First-class
Matches	27
Runs scored	279
Batting average	11.16
100s/50s	0/0
Top score	29
Balls bowled	2,200
Wickets	33
Bowling average	30.39
5 wickets in innings	0
10 wickets in match	0
Best bowling	4/39
Catches/stumpings	16/–
- Source: Cricinfo, January 2012

Bertram Harold Richardson (12 March 1932 – 24 September 2020) was an English cricketer who played first-class cricket for Derbyshire from 1950 to 1953.

Richardson was born at Ashton-under-Lyne, Lancashire. He joined Derbyshire at the start of the 1950 season and went on to play in the first and second XI. He made his first-class debut against Glamorgan in June 1950 in a match which was abandoned before he had a chance to bat. He made 14 first-class appearances in 1950 and his best bowling performance was 4 for 39 against Hampshire. He played eight matches in the 1951 season and took six wickets. He played two first-class matches in the 1952 season and three in the 1953 season when he played more games for the second XI and for the Club and Ground.

Richardson was a left-hand batsman and played 36 innings in 27 first-class matches at an average of 11.16 and a top score of 29, He was a slow left-arm orthodox bowler and took 33 first-class wickets at an average of 30.39 and a best performance of 4 for 39.
