= Jim Brailsford =

English cricketer

Personal information
- Full name: Frank Colliss Brailsford
- Born: 26 August 1933; Hepthorne Lane, Derbyshire, England
- Died: 19 June 2015 (aged 85)
- Nickname: Jim
- Batting: Right-handed
- Bowling: Right-arm medium

Domestic team information
- Years: Team
- 1958: Derbyshire
- FC debut: 9 August 1958 Derbyshire v Sussex
- Last FC: 16 August 1958 Derbyshire v Yorkshire

Career statistics
Competition	First-class
Matches	3
Runs scored	41
Batting average	8.20
100s/50s	0/0
Top score	14
Balls bowled	12
Wickets	1
Bowling average	2.00
5 wickets in innings	0
10 wickets in match	0
Best bowling	1/2
Catches/stumpings	1/–
- Source: CricketArchive, January 2012

Frank Colliss Brailsford (26 August 1933 – 19 June 2015), known as Jim Brailsford, was an English cricketer who played first-class cricket for Derbyshire in 1958.

Brailsford was born at Hepthorne Lane, Derbyshire. He joined Derbyshire in 1951 and played in 2nd XI and other matches until the 1958 season. He made his debut against Sussex in August 1958, and made two more first-class appearances in 1958. He continued playing in the Second XI Championship until 1968 and was active in other teams until 1975.

Brailsford was a right-handed batsman and played five innings in three first-class matches with an average of 8.20 and a top score of 41. He was a right-arm medium-pace bowler and tool a wicket in the two overs he bowled.

He died on 19 June 2015.
