= Desmond Snape =

English cricketer

Personal information
- Full name: Maurice Desmond Snape
- Born: 7 July 1923; Cresswell, Derbyshire, England
- Died: 17 April 1992 (aged 68); Worksop, England
- Batting: Right-handed

Domestic team information
- Years: Team
- 1949: Derbyshire
- FC debut: 1 June 1949 Derbyshire v Sussex
- Last FC: 4 June 1949 Derbyshire v Warwickshire

Career statistics
Competition	First-class
Matches	2
Runs scored	0
Batting average	0.00
100s/50s	0/0
Top score	0
Catches/stumpings	0/–
- Source: CricketArchive, January 2012

Maurice Desmond Snape (7 July 1923 – 17 April 1992), usually known as Desmond Snape, was an English cricketer who played first-class cricket for Derbyshire during the 1949 season.

Snape was born in Creswell, Derbyshire. He joined Derbyshire in 1948 and played mainly in the 2nd XI for the Minor Counties. In the 1949 season he played two first-class matches in June. His first-class debut was against Sussex in June 1949, but the game was abandoned while he was not out in the first innings. His next and last game was against Warwickshire when he was out lbw for a duck in both innings.

Snape was a right-handed batsman and played in two first-class matches, but never scored a run nor took a catch in the first-class game. Snape continued to play in the Derbyshire second XI and for the Club and Ground until 1951.

Snape died at the age of 68 in Worksop.
