= Guy Willatt =

English cricketer

Personal information
- Full name: Guy Longfield Willatt
- Born: 7 May 1918; Nottingham, England
- Died: 11 June 2003 (aged 85); Derby, England
- Batting: Left-handed
- Bowling: Right-arm
- Relatives: Jonathan Willatt (son)

Domestic team information
- Years: Team
- 1938–1947: Cambridge University
- 1939–1948: Nottinghamshire
- 1948–1950: Scotland
- 1950–1956: Derbyshire
- FC debut: 25 May 1938 Cambridge University v Essex
- Last FC: 12 August 1961 MCC v Ireland

Career statistics
Competition	First-class
Matches	185
Runs scored	8,325
Batting average	29.10
100s/50s	13/41
Top score	146
Balls bowled	221
Wickets	3
Bowling average	45.00
5 wickets in innings	0
10 wickets in match	0
Best bowling	2/18
Catches/stumpings	51/–
- Source: CricketArchive, 18 February 2010

Guy Longfield Willatt (7 May 1918 – 11 June 2003) was an English cricketer who played first-class cricket for Cambridge University from 1938 to 1947, for Nottinghamshire from 1939 to 1948, for Scotland from 1948 to 1950 and for Derbyshire from 1950 to 1956. He was captain of Derbyshire from 1951 to 1954 and also played for Marylebone Cricket Club (MCC).

Willatt was born at The Park, Nottingham. He was educated at Repton School and St Catharine's College, Cambridge. He played cricket for Cambridge University, two years before the war and at the same time performed in the second and first team at Nottinghamshire. However his university education was interrupted by the Second World War, when he served as an officer in the Royal Artillery. He still played for Nottinghamshire teams during the war. He resumed his studies at Cambridge and in 1947 was a football blue as well as captaining Cambridge University. He scored 90 in the Varsity Match that year. He continued playing for Nottinghamshire in the years immediately after the war.

On leaving university he moved to Edinburgh, where he taught at Edinburgh Academy and scored for The Grange. While he was in Scotland from 1948 to 1950 he played four times for Scotland.

In 1950 Willatt returned from Scotland to teach at Repton and, like John Eggar and Dick Sale, combined cricket for Derbyshire with his teaching career. He was also released from teaching in the summer term so he could captain the county. He was designated captain in the 1950 season but was hampered by injury and Pat Vaulkhard substituted for him in the role while on the field Willatt was an unpredictable, middle-order batsman during his first season. He took over as captain in the 1951 season and occupied the post for the next three years, in which he played consistently for the team. He scored a century against his former team Nottinghamshire in 1951 and Derbyshire finished eleventh in the County Championship. In 1952, which was his personal best season, Willatt scored 1,624 runs, at an average of 35.3 including two centuries and the club were fourth in the Championship. In the 1953 season Willatt's batting average dropped, and Derbyshire slipped to sixth. Willatt scored centuries against Kent and Sussex in the 1954 season and the club finished third in the county table.

In 1954 Willatt left Repton for Heversham Grammar School in Westmoreland, but continued playing for Derbyshire. In the 1955 season Willatt played five games for Derbyshire, and in his last season, 1956, he played four. Willatt played cricket for the MCC between 1951 and 1970 playing a first-class game against Ireland in 1961. He was also playing for Kendal Cricket Club.

Willatt was a left-handed batsman and played 303 innings in 185 first-class matches at an average of 29.10 and a top score of 146. He was a right-arm slow bowler and took three first-class wickets at an average of 45.00 and a best performance of 2 for 18. Off the field, Willatt was a moderniser who eliminated amateur-professional segregation at the club

Willatt became headmaster at Pocklington School, Yorkshire, in 1966 where he stayed until his retirement in 1980. During his time as headmaster, he taught, and frequently caned Adrian Edmondson. His nickname at the school was "Guybrows". He then returned to Derbyshire to live, becoming chairman of the Derbyshire Cricket committee from 1986 to 1990 and president of the club in 1995.

Willatt and his wife Marion were married for ? years until her death. They had three sons. He died at Derby aged 85.

Willatt's son, Jonathan, played first-class cricket for Cambridge University in 1989. Willatt had two elder brothers: Sir Hugh Willatt was a former secretary general to the Arts Council, and Geoffrey Willatt, a veteran of the prisoner of war camp Stalag Luft III.

Sporting positions
Preceded by Pat Vaulkhard	Derbyshire cricket captains 1951-1954	Succeeded by Donald Carr
