= Tom Hall (cricketer, born 1930) =

English cricketer

Personal information
- Full name: Thomas Auckland Hall
- Born: 19 August 1930; Darlington, England
- Died: 21 April 1984 (aged 53); Arlesey, Bedfordshire, England
- Batting: Right-handed
- Bowling: Right-arm fast-medium
- Role: Bowler

Domestic team information
- Years: Team
- 1949–1952: Derbyshire
- 1953–1954: Somerset
- First-class debut: 20 August 1949 Derbyshire v Nottinghamshire
- Last First-class: 8 June 1958 Free Foresters v Cambridge University

Career statistics
Competition	First-class
Matches	66
Runs scored	892
Batting average	11.15
100s/50s	0/2
Top score	69*
Balls bowled	9511
Wickets	183
Bowling average	27.91
5 wickets in innings	4
10 wickets in match	0
Best bowling	5/50
Catches/stumpings	29/–
- Source: Cricinfo, 11 March 2011

Thomas Auckland Hall (19 August 1930 – 21 April 1984) was an English amateur cricketer who played first-class cricket for Derbyshire from 1949 to 1952, for Somerset from 1953 to 1954 and for Marylebone Cricket Club (MCC) between 1951 and 1955.

== Cricket career ==
Hall was born at Darlington, County Durham and was educated at Uppingham School where he captained the first XI in 1948. He joined Derbyshire in the 1949 season playing two games for the second XI and made his first-class debut against Nottinghamshire in August 1949 when he neither scored nor took a wicket. However he returned for the first half of the 1950 season and against Surrey batting 9th man made 52, the highest score in a total of 147. During the season, he took 5 wickets for 60 against Hampshire. In the 1951 season he took 36 wickets at 23.69 with 5 for 57 against Leicestershire. In non-county matches that year, he took the wicket of Len Hutton three times in one week, once for Marylebone Cricket Club (MCC) and twice in a match for Gentlemen v Players and turned out to be Hutton's nemesis in many subsequent matches. He played two county games for Derbyshire in the 1952 season and otherwise played for MCC and Free Foresters.

In 1953 Hall joined Somerset. He took 58 wickets in the season and made his top score of 69 against Northamptonshire. He came in when the side were 129 behind with two wickets to go and played an unfinished partnership with Harold Gimblett. He played one game for Somerset in 1954 and then appeared for the Royal Air Force cricket team and Combined Services. In 1955 he played again for the RAF, and also took 5 for 50 for MCC against Yorkshire. From then on his first-class games were for Free Foresters against the universities and in 1958 he took 5 for 62 against Oxford University.

Hall was a right-arm fast-medium bowler and took 183 first-class wickets at an average of 27.91 and a best performance of 5 for 50. He was a right-hand batsman and played 103 innings in 66 first-class matches at an average of 11.15 and a top score of 69 not out.

Hall was a member of the crew of Timothy Colman's Crossbow, which broke the world speed sailing record in 1972.

Hall died at Arlesey, Bedfordshire at the age of 53.
