= Dusty Rhodes (cricketer) =

English cricketer and Test match umpire

Personal information
- Full name: Albert Ennion Groucott Rhodes
- Born: 10 October 1916; Tintwistle, Cheshire, England
- Died: 17 October 1983 (aged 67); Barlow, Derbyshire, England
- Nickname: Dusty
- Batting: Right-handed
- Bowling: Right-arm leg-break
- Relatives: Harold Rhodes (son)

Domestic team information
- Years: Team
- 1937–1954: Derbyshire
- FC debut: 12 May 1937 Derbyshire v Surrey
- Last FC: 18 August 1954 Derbyshire v Middlesex

Career statistics
Competition	First-class
Matches	275
Runs scored	7,363
Batting average	18.97
100s/50s	4/29
Top score	127
Balls bowled	38,345
Wickets	661
Bowling average	28.22
5 wickets in innings	29
10 wickets in match	4
Best bowling	8/162
Catches/stumpings	85/–
- Source: CricketArchive, 1 July 2010

Albert Ennion Groucott Rhodes, universally known as "Dusty" Rhodes (10 October 1916 – 17 October 1983), was an English cricketer who played first-class cricket for Derbyshire County Cricket Club between 1937 and 1954 and was also a Test match umpire.

Rhodes was born at Tintwistle, Cheshire. He made his debut for Derbyshire in the 1937 season against Surrey in May in a match which saw the fall of only one wicket before being concluded as a draw. Later in the season he took 6 for 38 against Somerset. In the 1938 season he scored 107 not out against Warwickshire and had two 5-wicket innings. After an uneventful season in 1939, Rhodes peak career was interrupted by the Second World War. In the 1946 season he took 7 for 109 against Glamorgan and achieved three more five wicket innings. In the 1947 season he achieved his best bowling performance of 8 for 162 against Yorkshire and four more 5 wicket innings. In the 1948 season he scored 105 not out against Hampshire and took two five wicket innings, and took a hat-trick for the MCC against Surrey at Lord's. He made his top score of 127 against Somerset and 126 against Nottinghamshire in the 1949 season and took two 5 wicket innings including 7 for 114 against Gloucestershire. In the 1950 season he took six 5 wicket innings including 7 for 68 against Oxford University and in the 1951 season had four 5 wicket innings including 7 for 56 against Lancashire. He toured India with MCC in 1951/52 and in the 1952 season took three five-wicket innings. He was down to three matches in 1953 and 1954 before he left the first-class game.

Rhodes was a right-hand batsman and played 422 innings in 275 first-class matches to score 7,363 runs with an average of 18.97. He scored four centuries with a top score of 127. He took 661 first-class wickets with his leg breaks at an average of 28.22, including a best performance of 8 for 162.

Rhodes later joined the first-class umpiring list, standing in eight Test matches between 1963 and 1973 and three ODIs between 1972 and 1973.

Rhodes died at Barlow, Derbyshire at the age of 67. He was the father of fast bowler Harold Rhodes.

== See also ==
- List of Test cricket umpires
- List of One Day International cricket umpires
