= Joseph Rimmer =

English cricketer

Personal information
- Full name: Joseph Rimmer
- Born: 6 January 1925; Langwith, Derbyshire, England
- Died: 9 July 2011 (aged 86); Mansfield, Nottinghamshire, England
- Batting: Right-handed
- Bowling: Right-arm medium

Domestic team information
- Years: Team
- 1949: Derbyshire
- FC debut: 1 June 1949 Derbyshire v Sussex
- Last FC: 23 July 1949 Derbyshire v Nottinghamshire

Career statistics
Competition	First-class
Matches	3
Runs scored	1
Batting average	1.00
100s/50s	0/0
Top score	1*
Balls bowled	381
Wickets	5
Bowling average	52.80
5 wickets in innings	0
10 wickets in match	0
Best bowling	2/71
Catches/stumpings	0/–
- Source: CricketArchive, January 2012

Joseph Rimmer (6 January 1925 – 9 July 2011) was an English cricketer who played for first-class cricket for Derbyshire in 1949.

Rimmer was born at Langwith, Derbyshire. He began playing for the Derbyshire second XI during the 1948 season. During the 1949 season he played three first team matches when he took wickets in all the matches and as a tail ender was only out once. His debut in the County Championship was in June against Sussex, and he only lost his wicket when he was run out against New Zealand. A season when there were four powerful bowlers in the Derbyshire team gave Rimmer little chance to show his bowling credentials and he returned to the Second XI where he played in the 1950 season.

Rimmer was a right-arm medium-pace bowler and took five first-class wickets with an average of 52.80 and a best performance of 2 for 71. He was a right-handed batsman and played three innings in three first-class matches in which he made one run altogether.
