= Reginald Carter (English cricketer) =

English cricketer

Personal information
- Born: 7 November 1933; Whitwell, Derbyshire, England
- Died: 14 July 2015 (aged 81)
- Batting: Right-handed
- Bowling: Left-arm slow orthodox

Domestic team information
- Years: Team
- 1953–1955: Derbyshire
- FC debut: 15 August 1953 Derbyshire v Leicestershire
- Last FC: 6 August 1955 Derbyshire v Yorkshire

Career statistics
Competition	First-class
Matches	17
Runs scored	130
Batting average	7.22
100s/50s	0/0
Top score	25
Balls bowled	1,600
Wickets	30
Bowling average	25.06
5 wickets in innings	1
10 wickets in match	0
Best bowling	7/46
Catches/stumpings	6/–
- Source: Cricinfo, 18 April 2011

Reginald Carter (7 November 1933 – 14 July 2015) was an English cricketer who played for Derbyshire from 1953 to 1955.

Carter was born at Whitwell, Derbyshire. He made his debut cricketing appearance for L. Lewin's XI in 1950, and for Derbyshire Second XI in the following year's Minor Counties Championship. He also played for Derbyshire Club and Ground at the same time as playing for the Second XI. Carter made his debut first-class appearance for Derbyshire during the 1953 season in which he made three appearances. In his second match he achieved seven for 46 against Somerset. His most active season with the team was 1954 season, in which he played nine County championship matches, and two matches against the touring Scots and Pakistanis. He played three first-class matches in the 1955 season and continued to play with the Derbyshire Second XI until the end of that season.

Carter was a slow left-arm bowler and took 30 first-class wickets at an average of 25.06 and with a best performance of 7 for 46. He was a right-handed batsman and played twenty two innings in seventeen first-class matches with an average of 7.22 and a top score of 25 runs.
