= Arnold Hamer =

English cricketer

Personal information
- Born: 8 December 1916; Huddersfield, England
- Died: 3 November 1993 (aged 76); Huddersfield, England
- Batting: Right-handed
- Bowling: Right-arm off-break

Domestic team information
- Years: Team
- 1938: Yorkshire
- 1950–1960: Derbyshire
- FC debut: 13 May 1938 Yorkshire v Essex
- Last FC: 15 June 1960 Derbyshire v Lancashire

Career statistics
Competition	First-class
Matches	295
Runs scored	15,465
Batting average	31.17
100s/50s	19/79
Top score	227
Balls bowled	5,355
Wickets	71
Bowling average	33.28
5 wickets in innings	0
10 wickets in match	0
Best bowling	4/27
Catches/stumpings	164/–
- Source: CricketArchive, 16 April 2011

Arnold Hamer
Personal information
- Position: Left back

Senior career*
Years	Team	Apps	(Gls)
1938	York City	8	(0)
- * Club domestic league appearances and goals

Arnold Hamer (8 December 1916 – 3 November 1993) was a first-class cricketer, who played for Yorkshire in 1938, and for Derbyshire between 1950 and 1960, scoring over 15,000 runs in first-class cricket. He also played as a footballer, playing eight games for York City in 1938.

== Early career ==
Hamer was born in Huddersfield, Yorkshire. He began playing cricket at Yorkshire in 1937 in the second eleven. He played two first-class matches for Yorkshire in 1938 making three runs in total, and taking one wicket for 64 runs. He also played football for York City in 1938, where he made eight appearances as a left back.

During World War II Hamer played occasional cricket games for Yorkshire teams. He was also a prolific scorer in the Bradford League for Pudsey St Lawrence which led Yorkshire president Tom Taylor to recommend him to Derbyshire.

== Derbyshire career ==
Hamer began his career with Derbyshire in the 1950 season when his top score was 80 and his average 28.58. He also took 15 wickets and achieved his best bowling performance of 4 for 27. In the 1951 season he scored his first century against Middlesex and took fifteen wickets again. In the 1952 season he scored a century in both matches against Nottinghamshire and one against Middlesex. He was top scorer for the club in the 1953 season when he made centuries against Yorkshire and Nottinghamshire. He also took 17 wickets. In the 1954 season he was top scorer again and scored centuries against Essex, Sussex and Yorkshire. He took ten wickets. He was top scorer for the club again in the 1955 season, and made centuries against Glamorgan and Nottinghamshire when he made his top score of 227. In the 1956 season he scored centuries against Glamorgan, Somerset and Nottinghamshire. He was top score for the club again in the 1957 season and made centuries against Sussex, Lancashire, Worcestershire and Surrey. He scored no centuries in the 1958 season, and scored one against Sussex in the 1959 season. He closed his first-class cricket career in the 1960 season.

Hamer was a right-handed opening batsman and made 15,465 runs at 31.17 in 295 first-class matches. He had a highest score of 227, and made 19 centuries. Hamer scored 1,000 runs in 10 consecutive seasons. He was also an off-break bowler, and took 71 first-class wickets at an average of 33.28.

Hamer died in Huddersfield in November 1993, at the age of 76.

== See also ==
- List of English cricket and football players
