= Charles Lee (cricketer) =

English cricketer

Personal information
- Born: 17 March 1924; Rotherham, England
- Died: 4 September 1999 (aged 75); Leicester, England
- Batting: Right-handed
- Bowling: Right arm medium

Domestic team information
- Years: Team
- 1952: Yorkshire
- 1954–1964: Derbyshire
- FC debut: 25 June 1952 Yorkshire v Scotland
- Last FC: 25 July 1964 Derbyshire v Gloucestershire

Career statistics
Competition	First-class	List A
Matches	271	2
Runs scored	12,129	42
Batting average	26.59	21
100s/50s	8/69	0/0
Top score	150	42
Balls bowled	1,615	–
Wickets	21	–
Bowling average	34.33	–
5 wickets in innings	0	–
10 wickets in match	0	–
Best bowling	2/9	–
Catches/stumpings	202/–	1/–
- Source: CricketArchive, 19 February 2010

Charles Lee (17 March 1924 – 4 September 1999) was an English first-class cricketer, who played two matches for Yorkshire in 1952, one for the Minor Counties in 1953, and 268 matches for Derbyshire between 1954 and 1964. He captained Derbyshire in his last two seasons in the game, and scored over 12,000 runs for the club.

Lee was born in Eastwood, Rotherham, Yorkshire, England, and became a schoolteacher after leaving the RAF in 1947. He appeared for Yorkshire Second XI for a couple of seasons before making his debut against Scotland. He played his only County Championship game for Yorkshire against Surrey in August 1952, deputising for Len Hutton, and was an instant success, opening the batting and scoring 74 and 14 as Yorkshire cruised to a nine wicket win.

Despite this bright start Lee was not retained by the county, and his county career might have ended there. He played in a match for the Minor Counties against the Australian tourists at Stoke on Trent in 1953 and, though he only scored 23, he was their sole source of resistance as they crumbled for 56 and 65 against Ray Lindwall and Richie Benaud. Derbyshire were impressed by his knock, and he joined the county for a ten-year stint in which he played 268 matches and rose to the captaincy.

Lee's new start was initially impeded by a broken leg, suffered while playing football, but he soon established himself in the team in the 1954 season and was awarded his cap in the 1956 season. A canny right-hander, he made 1,000 runs for eight successive seasons, nudging the ball into the gaps without often dominating the bowling. He cut loose in the occasional run chase, hitting five sixes off Jim McConnon at Swansea in the 1958 season and five more at Lord's in the 1961 season. In the 1963 season, he became county captain but, with their fast bowler Les Jackson in decline, he had little ammunition to work with. Derbyshire took the wooden spoon in his first season at the helm, but recovered to 12th in the 1964 season under his genial leadership before he decided to return to teaching.

A right-handed batsman, Lee scored 12,129 runs in all matches, with eight centuries and a best of 150 for Derbyshire against Gloucestershire and 147 against Nottinghamshire. He averaged 26.59 and took 202 catches. He took 21 wickets at 34.33 with his occasional right arm medium pace, with a best of 2 for 9 against Surrey. He played in just two Gillette Cup matches, scoring 42 against Northamptonshire.

Lee played cricket for Swinton C.C. and was captain of Rotherham C.C. in 1971. As a footballer, he was on Hull City's books at one time.

Lee died in Leicester at the age of 75.

Sporting positions
Preceded by Donald Carr	Derbyshire cricket captains 1963–1964	Succeeded by Derek Morgan
