= David Green (cricketer, born 1935) =

English cricketer (1935–2020)

Personal information
- Full name: David John Green
- Born: 18 December 1935; Burton upon Trent, England
- Died: 12 May 2020 (aged 84)
- Batting: Right-handed

Domestic team information
- Years: Team
- 1953–1960: Derbyshire
- 1957–1959: Cambridge University
- FC debut: 8 July 1953 Derbyshire v Kent
- Last FC: 20 May 1961 Free Foresters v Cambridge University

Career statistics
Competition	First-class
Matches	87
Runs scored	2,020
Batting average	20.20
100s/50s	1/14
Top score	134
Balls bowled	206
Wickets	1
Bowling average	99.00
5 wickets in innings	0
10 wickets in match	0
Best bowling	1/19
Catches/stumpings	62/–
- Source: CricketArchive, 18 April 2011

David John Green (18 December 1935 – 12 May 2020) was an English first-class cricketer who played for Derbyshire between 1953 and 1960 and for Cambridge University from 1957 to 1959.

== Cricket career ==
Green was born in Burton-on-Trent and educated at Burton Grammar School before going up to Christ's College, Cambridge. His first County Championship appearances for Derbyshire came at the age of 17 during the 1953 season. He remained a force in the middle order in the 1954 season, and following an impressive display against Kent, was selected to play for Derbyshire against the touring Pakistanis.

He appeared occasionally throughout the 1955 season and made a strong finish to 1956. He then went to Cambridge University and he spent the following spring playing for the university making impressive showings against County Cricket teams before resuming his role as a Derbyshire player later in the 1957 season. This pattern was repeated in 1958, although he made no appearances for Derbyshire during 1959. He played for Cambridge in the Varsity match in 1957, 1958 and 1959.

Green returned briefly for Derbyshire in the 1960 season, and played for Free Foresters in 1960 and 1961 against Cambridge University. He also played for Derbyshire's Second XI in the Minor Counties Championship and the Second XI Championship. In 1964 he played a one-day match for Wiltshire.
