= Pat Vaulkhard =

English cricketer

Personal information
- Full name: Patrick Vaulkhard
- Born: 15 September 1911; Nottingham, England
- Died: 1 April 1995 (aged 83); Cambridge, England
- Batting: Right-handed
- Role: Batsman; Occasional wicket-keeper

Domestic team information
- Years: Team
- 1934: Nottinghamshire
- 1946–1952: Derbyshire
- First-class debut: 12 May 1934 Nottinghamshire v Warwickshire
- Last First-class: 23 July 1952 Derbyshire v Worcestershire

Career statistics
Competition	First-class
Matches	77
Runs scored	2,460
Batting average	21.39
100s/50s	1/13
Top score	264
Balls bowled	156
Wickets	1
Bowling average	124.00
5 wickets in innings	0
10 wickets in match
Best bowling	1/30
Catches/stumpings	64/4
- Source: CricketArchive, 17 February 2010

Patrick Vaulkhard (15 September 1911 – 1 April 1995) was an English cricketer who played first-class cricket for Nottinghamshire in 1934 and for Derbyshire between 1946 and 1952, being captain in 1950.

Vaulkhard was born in Nottingham. He debuted for Nottinghamshire Second XI in the Minor Counties Championship at the age of nineteen in June 1931. He made his first-class debut for Nottinghamshire in the County Championship in 1934, and played a total of nine matches in the season without much success. He took his sole first-class wicket as a bowler against Sussex in June of that year.

Vaulkhard was a protégé of Sir Julien Cahn playing in several of his teams in the 1930s. In 1939 he played one season for Northumberland.

Vaulkhard returned to first-class cricket in the 1946 season, becoming one of the first post-war debutants for Derbyshire. During this season, he hit his first and only first-class century, a spectacular innings of 264 against his former club Nottinghamshire at Trent Bridge, when he batted seven hours. This was the highest score of any Derbyshire player of the season, and at the time when the 1995 Wisden Cricketers' Almanack was published it was the third highest score in first-class history by a player who never hit another century during their career. This innings was part of a fourth-wicket partnership with Denis Smith, which, at 328, remains a record for the team, and second in the list of single innings tallies for Derbyshire, only to George Davidson's innings of 274 in 1896.

Vaulkhard saw less involvement in first-class cricket in the 1947 season. But when Derbyshire defeated Somerset in a single day in 1947, dismissing them for 68 and 38, Vaulkard top scored with 84 in 90 minutes with 6 fours and 3 sixes. His averages tailed off to just five in the 1949 season. However Derbyshire had difficulties finding a committed captain in the post-war years, and Vaulkhard was called upon for the job in the 1950 season. He played more first-class games during this season than in any other, averaging 21 and scoring five first-class half centuries, while Derbyshire finished fifth in the County Championship under his leadership. During his final two years in first-class cricket, he played only five times, retiring from a first-class career spanning eighteen years in the 1952 season.

Vaulkhard was a middle-order batsman throughout his Derbyshire career, immediately prior to the emergence of Guy Willatt as a strong first-team player. He was a right-handed batsman and played 122 innings in 77 first-class matches with an average of 21.39 and a top score of 264. A powerful batsman, he regularly hit sixes, and once sent the ball over the football stand at Bradford. He had almost no backlift and so he relied on the punched straight drive. Vaulkhard occasionally kept wicket. As a bowler he took one first-class wicket at a cost of 124 runs.

Vaulkhard died in Cambridge at the age of 83. Vaulkhard's brother, Geoffrey, represented Nottinghamshire's Second XI in 1949, while another brother, Denis, represented the same team in 1931.

Sporting positions
Preceded by David Skinner	Derbyshire cricket captains 1950	Succeeded by Guy Willatt
