= Dick Sale =

English cricketer and schoolmaster

Personal information
- Full name: Richard Sale
- Born: 4 October 1919; Atcham, Shropshire, England
- Died: 3 February 1987 (aged 67); Beccles, Suffolk, England
- Batting: Left-handed
- Relatives: Richard Sale (father)

Domestic team information
- Years: Team
- 1939: Oxford University
- 1939–1947: Warwickshire
- 1949–1954: Derbyshire
- FC debut: 29 April 1939 Oxford University v Gloucestershire
- Last FC: 31 July 1954 Derbyshire v Warwickshire

Career statistics
Competition	First-class
Matches	66
Runs scored	2,923
Batting average	27.31
100s/50s	3/13
Top score	157
Balls bowled	2
Wickets	1
Bowling average	4.00
5 wickets in innings	0
10 wickets in match	0
Best bowling	1/4
Catches/stumpings	28/–
- Source: CricketArchive, 4 April 2011

Richard Sale (4 October 1919 – 3 February 1987) was an English schoolmaster and cricketer who played for Warwickshire between 1939 and 1947 and for Derbyshire between 1949 and 1954.

Sale was born in Atcham, Shropshire, the son of Richard Sale who had also played cricket for Derbyshire. He was educated at Repton School and Oriel College, Oxford, and played for Oxford University in 1939 opening the batting in the University Match against Cambridge University, which Oxford won. In the same year he made his debut for Warwickshire in a match in which the only play was his opening partnership. The Second World War interrupted his academic and playing career, as he was commissioned in the King's Shropshire Light Infantry and served in Canada and Normandy. In 1946 he played again for Oxford University, and again Oxford won the Varsity match. He then finished the season playing for Warwickshire.

Sale then became a master at Repton School, and made his debut for Derbyshire in the 1949 season. Sale with Guy Willatt, and John Eggar formed a trio of Repton masters who played for the county. He played for them annually during the school holidays until the 1954 season.

Sale was a left-hand batsman who played 115 innings in 66 first-class matches. His highest score was 157 in a match for Warwickshire against an Indian touring side, and his average was 27.31. He only bowled two balls which were in a match against Nottinghamshire in 1952, one of which was hit for four and the other gave him a wicket (c and b).

In 1962 Sale became headmaster of Oswestry School, and four years later he moved to Brentwood School as headmaster. Sale was public school representative on the FA Council and established the Public Schools Football Association of which he was the first chairman. The name was changed to the Independent Schools Football Association in 1986.

Sale died at Beccles, Suffolk aged 68.
