= John Eggar =

English cricketer and schoolmaster

Personal information
- Full name: John Drennan Eggar
- Born: 1 December 1916; Nowshera, North-West Frontier Province, British India
- Died: 3 May 1983 (aged 66); Hinton St George, Somerset, England
- Batting: Right-handed
- Bowling: Right-arm medium

Domestic team information
- Years: Team
- 1938: Oxford University
- 1938: Hampshire
- 1946–1954: Derbyshire

Career statistics
Competition	First-class
Matches	41
Runs scored	1,847
Batting average	31.84
100s/50s	4/9
Top score	219
Balls bowled	354
Wickets	1
Bowling average	193.00
5 wickets in innings	–
10 wickets in match	–
Best bowling	1/2
Catches/stumpings	20/–
- Source: Cricinfo, 1 January 2012

John Drennan Eggar (1 December 1916 — 3 May 1983) was an English schoolmaster and first-class cricketer who played for Oxford University and Hampshire in 1938 and for Derbyshire from 1946 to 1954. His career as a schoolmaster began in 1938, with his appointment to Repton School. He spent 25 years at Repton, before being appointed headmaster at the newly established Shiplake College, where he oversaw an increase in the number of enrolled pupils and the expansion of the school.

== Early life ==
The son of John Norman Eggar and his wife Emily Garret, he was born in British India at Nowshera. He was educated in England at Winchester College, where he played for the college cricket team, captaining it in his final year. While at Winchester, he was coached by Harry Altham and Rockley Wilson. From there, he matriculated to Trinity College, Oxford.

Whilst studying at Oxford, Eggar was a member of the Oxford University Cricket Club. He made his debut in first-class cricket for the club against Gloucestershire at Oxford in 1938. In his second first-class match against the touring Australians, he scored 51 runs in Oxford's first innings total of 117 all out in response to the Australians 679 for 7 declared. Six weeks later he scored his maiden first-class century, with 125 against Lancashire. Following a score of 98 against Sussex, he was selected for the Oxford side for that season's University Match against Cambridge University at Lord's; his defensive score of 29 helped Oxford to save the match, with Eggar gaining his blue. In eight matches for Oxford in 1938, he scored 424 runs at an average of 38.54. Following the end of the university season, he made two appearances for Hampshire against Worcestershire and Gloucestershire in the County Championship. After graduating from Oxford in 1938, he became an assistant-master at Repton School.

== War service and Repton years ==
Eggar served in the British Army during the Second World War, being commissioned into the Rifle Brigade as a second lieutenant from the Repton School Contingent in April 1940. By September 1941, he was serving in the Royal Pioneer Corps with the war substantive rank of lieutenant, prior to transferring back to the Rifle Brigade in July 1943. During the war, he saw action in both the North African and Italian campaigns.

After the war, Eggar returned to teaching at Repton. He played for Derbyshire during the summer holidays; alongside Guy Willatt and Dick Sale, he formed a trio of Repton masters who played for the county. In the 1947 season he shared a record-breaking partnership of 349 with Charlie Elliott in the year when Derbyshire finished 5th; this club record partnership would stand until 1997, when it was broken by Kim Barnett and Tim Tweats' 417-run partnership. In 1949, he made his highest first-class score when he made 219 against Yorkshire at Bradford. He played regularly in the summer holidays for Derbyshire until 1950, but appeared in just three further first-class matches thereafter: against the touring South Africans in 1951, and twice in the 1954 County Championship. In 31 first-class appearances for Derbyshire, he scored 1,385 runs at an average of 31.47, making three centuries and six half centuries.

At Repton, he coached the cricket team and commanded the Combined Cadet Force (CCF), having been appointed an acting captain in April 1948. He also sat on the Parish Council in Repton. His association with the school's CCF continued until December 1959, when he resigned his commission and was granted the honorary rank of lieutenant colonel.

== Headmastership at Shiplake ==
In 1963 Eggar became headmaster of newly established Shiplake College. Under his headmastership, numbers went from 150 to 300, and he oversaw the expansion of the school through the construction of new buildings and the addition of new facilities. Just as he had at Repton, Eggar sat on the Parish Council at Shiplake. He was also chairman of the local branch of the Royal British Legion. He spent sixteen years as headmaster at Shiplake, before retiring in 1979. Eggar died on 3 May 1983, whilst playing tennis at Hinton St George, Somerset.

Eggar's father-in-law was John Crommelin-Brown, another Repton master, who played cricket for Derbyshire during the 1920s. His son Tim Eggar became a Member of Parliament for Enfield North.
