= George Dawkes =

English cricketer (1920–2006)

Personal information
- Full name: George Owen Dawkes
- Born: 19 July 1920; Leicester, England
- Died: 10 August 2006 (aged 86); Leicester, England
- Batting: Right-handed
- Role: Wicketkeeper

Domestic team information
- Years: Team
- 1937–1939: Leicestershire
- 1947–1961: Derbyshire
- FC debut: 12 June 1937 Leicestershire v Nottinghamshire
- Last FC: 22 August 1961 Derbyshire v Surrey

Career statistics
Competition	First-class
Matches	482
Runs scored	11,411
Batting average	18.08
100s/50s	1/33
Top score	143
Balls bowled	23
Wickets	0
Bowling average	–
5 wickets in innings	–
10 wickets in match	–
Best bowling	0/0
Catches/stumpings	893/148
- Source: CricketArchive, 12 January 2009

George Owen Dawkes (19 July 1920 – 10 August 2006) was a first-class cricketer who played for Leicestershire between 1937 and 1939 and for Derbyshire between 1947 and 1961 as a wicket keeper and a lower-order right-handed batsman. During the 1949–50 season he toured India with a team of players making up a Commonwealth XI.

== Leicestershire cricketer ==
Dawkes was born at Leicester and made his debut for Leicestershire in the 1937 season at the age of 16. According to Wisden Cricketers' Almanack, he "was claimed to be the youngest wicket-keeper ever to take part in county cricket". He played in 11 matches in the 1937 season as replacement for the injury-prone main wicketkeeper, Percy Corrall, taking 13 catches and making four stumpings. For a player who later earned a reputation as a solid lower-order batsman, his batting record was singular: in 17 innings, he made 53 runs, and never once reached double figures.

In 1938 and 1939, though Corrall was fit again, Dawkes was preferred as Leicestershire's first-choice wicketkeeper. He was awarded his county cap in 1938 and by the end of the season he was batting regularly at No 7 or No 8, which would remain his usual batting place for the rest of his career. He made his first two scores of more than 50 in 1939, and his 81 against Somerset in a follow-on that almost turned into a victory was his highest score for Leicestershire. Leicestershire finished bottom of the County Championship in 1939, but Dawkes' wicketkeeping earned praise from Wisden: "Without doubt the brightest part of the Leicestershire cricket was the magnificent wicket-keeping of Dawkes, who also showed much improvement with the bat," it wrote. "Many competent judges regarded Dawkes as an England wicket-keeper of the future."

== Derbyshire cricketer ==
Dawkes served with the Royal Air Force during the Second World War, and was not discharged in time to take part in county cricket on its resumption in 1946. In his absence, Corrall resumed as regular wicketkeeper for Leicestershire. Still in the RAF in the first two-thirds of the 1947 season, Dawkes played three first-class matches for the Combined Services cricket team before his discharge in August, when he joined Derbyshire for the county's final four County Championship matches of the season. Until Dawkes' arrival, Derbyshire had lacked a full-time wicketkeeper all season: the job was being done, mostly, by the former England batsman Denis Smith, and Wisden noted that "handicapped by injury and the cares of wicket-keeping, Denis Smith revealed only glimpses of his true form". For some matches when Smith was injured, Derbyshire had recalled prewar wicketkeeper Harry Elliott, believed at the time to be 51, but in reality 55 years of age. Unsurprisingly, at the end of the season, Dawkes was offered a contract and accepted.

Dawkes therefore became Derbyshire's regular wicketkeeper from the start of the 1948 season and missed very few matches for the county over the next 13 seasons. In all, he played 392 first-class matches for Derbyshire, which puts him 10th on the all-time list of appearances. He is also third on the list of Derbyshire wicketkeepers, behind his successor, Bob Taylor and Harry Elliott, for catches, stumpings and overall dismissals.

Dawkes was awarded his Derbyshire county cap in 1948, and also increased his own personal highest score in the match against Nottinghamshire at Ilkeston that season, scoring 95 in a partnership of 149 for the sixth wicket with George Pope which took control of what had been until then an even game. That remained his highest score for six seasons, and his batting went through something of a trough from 1949 to 1953, in a couple of years averaging only 12 runs per innings.

== Representative cricket ==
That he was on the fringes of consideration for the England Test team in this postwar period is indicated by the fact that he was chosen in 1948 for the opening Marylebone Cricket Club (MCC) match of the season, against Yorkshire, and for the season-ending North v South match. He appeared in other MCC and North v South matches in 1949 and 1950. And in 1951 he was picked for an England XI against a Commonwealth XI in another end-of-season cricket festival, when he was also chosen for a Gentlemen v Players match at Scarborough.

But no call came from the England selectors, and Dawkes' only taste of representative cricket was as a member of the Commonwealth XI cricket team that visited India and Pakistan in the 1949–50 season, playing five matches against a full Indian cricket team that were termed "unofficial Tests". The side was organised by the former Lancashire and England wicketkeeper George Duckworth and many of the recruits came from the Lancashire League. They nevertheless included prominent names: Frank Worrell among them. Dawkes' own prospects were limited by the inclusion of Jock Livingston, the Australian batsman who could also keep wicket, as the side's captain. Dawkes played in only one of the "Test" matches, batting at No 11 and making one stumping.

== Later career ==
From 1954 to 1960, Dawkes remained the regular wicketkeeper for Derbyshire, but also became more reliable in his batting. In 1954, he made the sole first-class century of his career, 143 in the match against Hampshire at Burton on Trent. He put on 191 for the seventh wicket with John Kelly. That 1954 season, he made 864 runs at an average of 21.07, and in 1956 he went on to 963 runs at 26.75, which was the best average of his career. Finally in 1960, he made 964 runs, his highest aggregate in a single season, averaging 21.90; in the same season, he passed 1,000 dismissals in first-class cricket.

Dawkes' reliability as a wicketkeeper was commented on in many editions of Wisden across the 1950s, but his season figures were rarely spectacular, Derbyshire relying heavily on a fast bowling attack consisting for the bulk of Dawkes' career of Les Jackson and Cliff Gladwin, which gave a lot of chances to slip fielders such as Donald Carr, as well as behind the wicket. But he achieved, on behalf of Jackson, a hat-trick of catches in the match against Worcestershire at Kidderminster in 1958.

In 1961, after 13 seasons for Derbyshire without being much affected by injury, Dawkes was sidelined for more than half the season by problems with his knee. Derbyshire recruited Bob Taylor from Minor Counties cricket with Staffordshire as Dawkes' deputy, and Taylor took over as first choice wicketkeeper at the end of the season. Dawkes played a couple of second eleven matches in 1962, and then retired.

Dawkes died in Leicester at the age of 86.
