= Charlie Elliott =

English cricketer, cricket umpire, and footballer

Personal information
- Full name: Charles Standish Elliott
- Born: 24 April 1912; Bolsover, Derbyshire, England
- Died: 1 January 2004 (aged 91); Nottingham, England
- Height: 5 ft 9 1/2 in (177 cm)
- Batting: Right-handed
- Bowling: Right-arm off-break
- Relatives: Harry Elliott (uncle)

Domestic team information
- Years: Team
- 1932–1953: Derbyshire
- FC debut: 14 May 1932 Derbyshire v Warwickshire
- Last FC: 15 August 1953 Derbyshire v Leicestershire

Career statistics
Competition	First-class
Matches	275
Runs scored	11,965
Batting average	27.25
100s/50s	9/59
Top score	215
Balls bowled	926
Wickets	11
Bowling average	47.81
5 wickets in innings	0
10 wickets in match	0
Best bowling	2/25
Catches/stumpings	209/1
- Source: CricketArchive, 19 April 2010

Charles Standish Elliott MBE (24 April 1912 – 1 January 2004) was an English first-class cricketer who played for Derbyshire between 1932 and 1953, an international umpire and a part-time footballer.

Elliott was born in Bolsover, Derbyshire. In the 1931–1932 season, he played football for Coventry City, where he was a capable defender, but did not play again for them for several years. In the summer of 1932, he began his cricketing career at Derbyshire where he was an opening batsman and fine close fielder.

Elliott's first spell for Derbyshire lasted from 1932 to 1937 and he played for the side that won the County Championship in 1936. Because of a financial crisis at the club, he was released and became a professional for Stourbridge. At the start of the Second World War he joined the Coventry Fire Brigade and was on the roof of Coventry Cathedral during the blitz which destroyed it.

After the war, he played again for Derbyshire and scored 1,000 runs in six consecutive seasons from 1947 to 1952. In total he played 468 innings in 275 matches with nine centuries and an average of 27.25. His best score was 215 against Nottinghamshire in 1947, when he shared a stand of 349 with John Eggar. In bowling, he took eleven wickets at an average of 47.81 and a best performance of 2–25. He also played football for Coventry City again in the 1947–48 season bringing his Football League appearances total to 95. He was caretaker-manager for Coventry for six months in 1954–55.

Elliott served as a first-class umpire for nearly two decades, from 1956 to 1974. He umpired in 42 Tests between 1957 and 1974 and in five One Day Internationals between 1972 and 1974. He served on the England Test selection panel from 1975 to 1981 and was President of Derbyshire in 1993 and 1994.

Elliott was in Melbourne when the Third Test of the 1970–71 Ashes series was washed out. He was asked to award the Man of the Match award in the first ever One Day International, arranged at the last minute to replace the Test, and gave it to John Edrich for his top-scoring 82 as "without John's 82 there'd have been no match".

A dapper man with immaculately groomed black hair, which he retained into old age, he died at Nottingham, where he had kept a guest house, eight years short of his century.

Elliott was the nephew of Harry Elliott, the Derbyshire and England Test wicketkeeper and played alongside his uncle in pre-Second World War games and in 1947, when Harry reappeared in four matches at the age of 55 because of a Derbyshire injury crisis.
