= Edwin Smith (cricketer, born 1934) =

English cricketer (1934–2026)

Personal information
- Born: 2 January 1934; Grassmoor, Derbyshire, England
- Died: July 2026 (aged 92)
- Batting: Right-handed
- Bowling: Right-arm off-break

Domestic team information
- Years: Team
- 1951–1971: Derbyshire
- FC debut: 6 June 1951 Derbyshire v Hampshire
- Last FC: 1 September 1971 Derbyshire v Surrey
- LA debut: 22 May 1963 Derbyshire v Hampshire
- Last LA: 2 May 1971 Derbyshire v Yorkshire

Career statistics
Competition	First-class	LA
Matches	503	8
Runs scored	6,998	89
Batting average	13.20	14.83
100s/50s	0/8	0/0
Top score	90	28
Balls bowled	78,328	253
Wickets	1,217	2
Bowling average	25.84	82.00
5 wickets in innings	51	0
10 wickets in match	4	0
Best bowling	9/46	1/46
Catches/stumpings	207/–	4/–
- Source: CricketArchive, 7 April 2011

Edwin Smith (2 January 1934 – July 2026) was an English county cricketer who played for Derbyshire between 1951 and 1971 and took over 1200 wickets.

== Biography ==
Smith was born in Grassmoor, Derbyshire on 2 January 1934. He played his entire first-class career for Derbyshire, playing 503 First Class matches in a career spanning 20 years from 1951 to 1971.

He was primarily an off-spin bowler and took 1217 first-class wickets at an average of 25.84, with 51 5 wicket innings and a best performance of 9 for 46. He was also a useful lower middle order batsman and scored nearly 7000 runs with a highest score of 90.

England had other very good off-spin bowlers during Smith's career, including Jim Laker, Fred Titmus, David Allen and Ray Illingworth, and Smith did not play Test cricket.

Smith died in July 2026, aged 92.
