= Alan Revill =

English cricketer

Personal information
- Full name: Alan Chambers Revill
- Born: 27 March 1923; Sheffield, England
- Died: 6 July 1998 (aged 75); Brent, London, England
- Batting: Right-handed
- Bowling: Right-arm off-break
- Relatives: Thomas Revill (father)

Domestic team information
- Years: Team
- 1946–1957: Derbyshire
- 1958–1960: Leicestershire
- FC debut: 18 May 1946 Derbyshire v Essex
- Last FC: 1 June 1960 Leicestershire v Middlesex

Career statistics
Competition	First-class	List A
Matches	387	1
Runs scored	15,917	0
Batting average	26.48	0.00
100s/50s	16/80	0/0
Top score	156*	0
Balls bowled	3,494	12
Wickets	49	1
Bowling average	39.26	6.00
5 wickets in innings	0	0
10 wickets in match	0	0
Best bowling	3/12	1/6
Catches/stumpings	396/–	0/–
- Source: CricketArchive, 9 March 2011

Alan Chambers Revill (27 March 1923 – 6 July 1998) was an English cricketer who played for Derbyshire between 1946 and 1957 and for Leicestershire from 1958 to 1960. He scored more than 15,000 first-class runs.

Revill was born in Sheffield, the son of Thomas who played first-class cricket for Derbyshire between 1913 and 1920. Revill's career began at Derbyshire where he appeared in the non first-class programme in 1945. He made his first-class debut for Derbyshire in the 1946 season at Ilford against Essex in May, scoring 31 and 48. He finished the year with 616 runs and played regularly for the county until the end of the 1957 season. with a career-best 156 not out against Leicestershire in 1949.

Revill, a fine close fielder, lost form in the 1956 season and after failing again to reach 1000 runs in the 1957 season, he transferred to the weak Leicestershire eleven where after two fair returns he dropped out of the team during 1960, playing last against Middlesex at Lords where he scored 0.

Revill was a right-handed batsman and played 654 innings in 387 first-class matches with an average of 26.48 and a top score of 156 not out. He hit sixteen centuries and passed 1000 runs in a season nine times (including twice for Leicestershire) with a best of 1643 runs (35.71) in 1950. He was an occasional right-arm off-break bowler and took 49 first-class wickets with an average of 39.26 and a best performance of 3 for 12. He played one one-day match without scoring, but taking a wicket.

Revill played in Leicestershire Second Eleven in 1960 and 1962. From 1963 until 1965, and again in 1968, he played for Berkshire, making an appearance in the 1965 Gillette Cup against Somerset. His picture is up in the Gateway Centre, Derby.

Revill died at the age of 75 in Brent, London. In his obituary in The Daily Telegraph, it was noted that he was a fine raconteur. Michael Parkinson said "he could talk the leg off an iron pot".
