= Donald Carr =

English cricketer (1926–2016)

Donald Carr OBE
Personal information
- Full name: Donald Bryce Carr
- Born: 28 December 1926; Wiesbaden, Germany
- Died: 12 June 2016 (aged 89)
- Batting: Right-handed
- Bowling: Slow left-arm orthodox
- Relatives: John Lillingston Carr (father); John Donald Carr (son)

International information
- National side: England
- Test debut: 2 November 1951 v India
- Last Test: 10 February 1952 v India

Domestic team information
- Years: Team
- 1946–1963: Derbyshire
- 1949–1951: Oxford University
- 1964–1968: Free Foresters

Career statistics
| Competition | Tests | FC | LA |
|---|---|---|---|
| Matches | 2 | 446 | 2 |
| Runs scored | 135 | 10,257 | 11 |
| Batting average | 33.75 | 28.61 | 5.50 |
| 100s/50s | 0/1 | 24/100 | 0/0 |
| Top score | 76 | 170 | 11 |
| Balls bowled | 210 | 20,313 | 0 |
| Wickets | 2 | 328 | – |
| Bowling average | 70.00 | 34.74 | – |
| 5 wickets in innings | 0 | 5 | – |
| 10 wickets in match | 0 | 0 | – |
| Best bowling | 1/84 | 7/53 | – |
| Catches/stumpings | 0/– | 500/– | 0/– |
- Source: CricInfo, 13 December 2018

Donald Bryce Carr OBE (28 December 1926 – 12 June 2016) was an English cricketer who played for Derbyshire from 1946 to 1967, for Oxford University from 1948 to 1951, and twice for England in 1951/52. He captained Derbyshire between 1955 and 1962 and scored over 10,000 runs for the county.

His cricket administration roles included twelve years as assistant secretary to the Marylebone Cricket Club (MCC), taking over as secretary of the fledgling Test and County Cricket Board in 1976. In his ten years in that role, cricket writer, Colin Bateman noted that Carr "mixed diplomacy with a sense of justice as first the Packer Affair, and then the first rebel tour to South Africa, threatened to split the world game".

== Life and career ==
Carr was the son of John Carr, an officer of the Royal Berkshire Regiment, who was serving with the British Army of the Rhine in Germany. He went to Forres Boarding School in Swanage (the headmaster, R. M. Chadwick, a former opening bat for Dorset Minor Counties 1st XI, coached him) and then to Repton School, where his father had taken the post of bursar. Already an above average boy cricketer, he developed into one of the best young all-rounders under the coaching of Lionel Blaxland and Garnet Lee. In 1944 his last year at Repton, he captained The Rest against the Lord's Schools and the Public Schools' side against a Lord's XI.

Carr joined the Army on 1 January 1945, and was sent to Northern Ireland, where he had little scope to play serious cricket. In the summer he went to Wrotham for a training course and was chosen, on the withdrawal of George Pope, for England in the third Victory Test match against the Australian Services XI at Lord's. He went to the Royal Military College, Sandhurst, and gained a Commission in the Royal Berkshire Regiment in February 1946. In the 1946 season he first played for Derbyshire in the County Championship. He made his debut against Kent, when he scored a duck in his only innings in a drawn match, but took two wickets. He also played for Combined Services.

Carr did not play first-class cricket in 1947, as he was serving in Burma, but left the army in April 1948 and went to Worcester College, Oxford. He played in the County Championship for Derbyshire in the 1948 season and, in 1949, made the Oxford University team. He also finished off the season playing for Derbyshire in the 1949 season when he scored 1,210 runs and hit three centuries, with his career top score 170 for Oxford University against Leicestershire. In 1950, he captained Oxford, and took six for 39 against Lancashire. In his final year at Oxford his 34 and 50 helped defeat Cambridge by 21 runs in the Varsity match, and he also headed the Derbyshire Championship averages in the 1951 season.

After university, Carr went to work for a Midlands brewery, but before starting he was given permission to tour as vice-captain to Nigel Howard in the Marylebone Cricket Club (MCC) team in India, Pakistan and Ceylon. He played in two Test matches against India in 1951–52. In the first, at Delhi, England were in a desperate situation until he and Allan Watkins stayed together for just over five hours and added 158 to save the game. He was captain in Howard's absence in the fifth Test, which was the first time England lost to India, leaving the series drawn at 1–1. In his Test career he played four innings in two matches at an average of 33.75, and a highest score of 76. He took two Test wickets for 140 runs.

He captained an MCC "A" side in Pakistan in 1955-56. He had been in the same Oxford side in 1949 as his opposing captain, Abdul Hafeez Kardar. He upset Kardar by joking that his nickname at Oxford, "the Mystic of the East", had been mistranslated as "the Mistake of the East". During the third unofficial Test at Peshawar, Carr and two other England players carried out a prank on the umpire Idris Baig, who had given several decisions that the England side regarded as poor, soaking him with water. Baig took this good-naturedly, but Hafeez decided to treat it as an insult to the pride of Pakistan. MCC offered to cancel the tour and subsequently held Carr responsible for the incident, something that he had already accepted.

Carr scored 2,092 runs at an average of more than 44 runs an innings in the 1959 season, and was named Wisden Cricketer of the Year in 1960.

Carr played 745 innings on 446 first-class matches, with an average of 28.61 and a top score of 170. He took 328 first-class wickets at an average of 34.74, and a best performance of 7 for 53.

Carr represented Oxford University at football, and played in the FA Amateur Cup final twice for the winning Pegasus side in 1951 and 1953.

Carr later became an ICC match referee. After his retirement, he became assistant secretary of the MCC from 1963 to 1976, and then secretary to the Cricket Council and the Test and County Cricket Board – both forerunners of the England and Wales Cricket Board (ECB) – for ten years after that. He also managed several MCC tours in the 1960s and 1970s.

Carr's son John played for Middlesex.

== See also ==
- List of Test cricketers born in non-Test playing nations

Sporting positions
| Preceded by Guy Willatt | Derbyshire cricket captains 1955–1962 | Succeeded by Charles Lee |
