= Cliff Gladwin =

English cricketer (1916–1988)

Personal information
- Full name: Clifford Gladwin
- Born: 3 April 1916; Doe Lea, Derbyshire, England
- Died: 10 April 1988 (aged 72); Chesterfield, England
- Batting: Right-handed
- Bowling: Right-arm fast-medium
- Relatives: Joseph Gladwin (father)

International information
- National side: England (1947–1949)
- Test debut (cap 322): 5 July 1947 v South Africa
- Last Test: 25 June 1949 v New Zealand

Domestic team information
- Years: Team
- 1939–1959: Derbyshire

Career statistics
Competition	Test	First-class
Matches	8	374
Runs scored	170	6,283
Batting average	28.33	17.35
100s/50s	0/1	1/15
Top score	51*	124*
Balls bowled	2129	81,296
Wickets	15	1653
Bowling average	38.06	18.30
5 wickets in innings	0	101
10 wickets in match	0	18
Best bowling	3/21	9/41
Catches/stumpings	2/–	135/–
- Source: CricketArchive, 24 June 2010

Clifford Gladwin (3 April 1916 – 10 April 1988) was an English first-class cricketer who played for Derbyshire from 1939 to 1958 and in eight Tests for England from 1947 to 1949. He took over 1,600 first-class wickets.

A tall right-arm medium-fast seam bowler of great accuracy and consistency, Gladwin formed, with Les Jackson, the most feared new ball attack in the English first-class game for a dozen years after World War II. Gladwin was both penetrative and mean, with around a third of his overs being maidens, and in thirteen full seasons he took 100 or more wickets twelve times, usually at an average of under 20 runs per wicket.

Cricket writer, Colin Bateman noted that "Gladwin was so proud of his miserly bowling, that he would correct the Scorers at the close of play if there was an error in their figures".

== Life and career ==
Gladwin was born 3 April 1916 at Doe Lea, Derbyshire, the son of Joseph Gladwin who also played for Derbyshire. He made his debut for Derbyshire in the 1939 season and played a handful of games that year.

After World War II, Gladwin returned to the county in the 1946 season, taking over 100 wickets and leading an attack weakened by the absence of Bill Copson. With the return of Copson and George Pope the following year, Gladwin formed the only pace attack of even reasonable quality in an era when most counties relied largely on spin. All three played Test cricket against South Africa the following year. Gladwin at Old Trafford conceded only 58 runs in a marathon stint of 50 overs.

Although Gladwin headed the first-class averages in the 1948, he did not play against the 1948 Australians, the team dubbed "The Invincibles". He did, however, play five Tests on the tour to South Africa in 1948–49 under George Mann. There he became a national hero, by running the leg bye that won the Durban Test for England, to achieve the only last-ball victory in the history of Test matches.

By the 1949 season, Gladwin had developed so much as a batsman that he made 124 against Nottinghamshire and scored over 900 runs. However, he did not maintain this standard and only made one score over fifty in his last six seasons. However, as a bowler, Gladwin was always near the top of the averages until he retired in 1958 – though the return of England's pace bowling to more reasonable strength meant that he was out of the running for a Test berth during the 1950s. At times, owing to Derbyshire's shortage of spin, Gladwin actually bowled off-breaks when conditions were favourable.

Gladwin's career total of 1,653 wickets puts him 60th on the all-time list of wicket-takers, and his 1952 match performance of 16 for 84 against Worcestershire is the second best in post-World War II county cricket, being bettered by only one run by Tony Lock four years later. His bowling average was 18.30, and his best innings performance 9 for 41.

Gladwin was a right hand batsman and played 510 innings in 374 first-class matches at an average of 17.35, and a top score of 124 not out. His batting performance stands out in comparison with fellow Derbyshire pace bowlers Bestwick, Copson, Jackson, Rhodes, Ward and Hendrick – who did not make a single fifty between them in 2,195 first-class innings.

Gladwin retired in 1958 and returned to league cricket in Staffordshire and Yorkshire, remaining a popular and respected professional.

Gladwin died 10 April 1988 in Chesterfield, seven days after his 72nd birthday.
