= Derbyshire County Cricket Club in 1976 =

1976 season of an English cricket team

Derbyshire County Cricket Club seasons
1976 season
- Captain: Bob Taylor
- County Championship: 15
- John Player League: 12
- Gillette Cup: Quarter-final
- Benson & Hedges Cup.: Group
- Most runs: Eddie Barlow
- Most wickets: Geoff Miller
- Most catches: Bob Taylor

Derbyshire County Cricket Club in 1976 was the cricket season when the English club Derbyshire had been playing for one hundred and five years. In the County Championship, they won four matches to finish fifteenth in their seventy-second season in the Championship. They came twelfth in the John Player League and reached the quarter-final of the Gillette Cup. They were eliminated at group level in the Benson & Hedges Cup.

== 1976 season ==
Derbyshire played twenty matches in the County Championship, one each against Oxford and Cambridge University and one against the touring West Indians. They won six first class matches overall but two of these were against the universities when Phil Sharpe clocked up a century and a double century. Derbyshire won seven and lost nine matches in the Sunday league.

Bob Taylor was in his second season as captain. Eddie Barlow was top scorer overall in the Championship and one competitions although Alan Hill was top scorer in the championship alone. Geoff Miller took most wickets.

== Matches ==
=== First Class ===
List of matches
No.	Date	V	Result	Margin	Notes
1	28 Apr 1976	Sussex; Rutland Recreation Ground, Ilkeston	Lost	5 wickets	AJ Borrington 102; G Miller 6-55; Greig 5-36; Waller 5-46
2	12 May 1976	Lancashire; Old Trafford, Manchester	Drawn		Wood 101
3	19 May 1976	Leicestershire; Grace Road, Leicester	Drawn		Davison 106
4	29 May 1976	Nottinghamshire; Rutland Recreation Ground, Ilkeston	Drawn		EJ Barlow 118; A Ward 5-66
5	2 Jun 1976	Oxford University Cricket Club; The University Parks, Oxford	Won	Innings and 53 runs	PJ Sharpe 228; FW Swarbrook 5-34
6	12 Jun 1976	Leicestershire; Queen's Park, Chesterfield	Lost	7 wickets	
7	16 Jun 1976	Yorkshire; Abbeydale Park, Sheffield	Drawn		PE Russell 7-46
8	19 Jun 1976	Essex; Castle Park Cricket Ground, Colchester	Lost	Innings and 43 runs	Fletcher 114; Turner 5-33
9	23 Jun 1976	Cambridge University Cricket Club; Bass Worthington Ground, Burton-on-Trent	Won	Innings and 53 runs	PJ Sharpe 144; Bannister 5-50; G Miller 5-70
10	30 Jun 1976	Northamptonshire; Rutland Recreation Ground, Ilkeston	Drawn		Bedi 6-43; FW Swarbrook 6-29
11	3 Jul 1976	West Indian cricket team in England in 1976; Queen's Park, Chesterfield	Lost	10 wickets	Rowe 152; Gomes 190; Padmore 6-101
12	7 Jul 1976	Warwickshire; Courtaulds Ground, Coventry	Drawn		Amiss 101
13	10 Jul 1976	Somerset; Queen's Park, Chesterfield	Won	85 runs	K Stevenson 5-47; A Ward 6-52
14	21 Jul 1976	Kent; Crabble Athletic Ground, Dover	Lost	62 runs	FW Swarbrook 6-54; Rowe 5-25 and 6-46; G Miller 7-74
15	24 Jul 1976	Glamorgan; Ind Coope Ground, Burton-on-Trent	Lost	93 runs	M Hendrick 6-40; EJ Barlow 5-63; Nash 5-44
16	28 Jul 1976	Surrey; Rutland Recreation Ground, Ilkeston	Won	4 wickets	Roope 100; EJ Barlow 217; FW Swarbrook 5-66; G Miller 5-74
17	31 Jul 1976	Yorkshire; Queen's Park, Chesterfield	Drawn		A Hill 151; PJ Sharpe 126
18	7 Aug 1976	Middlesex; Lord's Cricket Ground, St John's Wood	Lost	106 runs	G Barlow 160; G Miller 6-130 and 6-88; Titmus 6-63 and 6-72
19	14 Aug 1976	Worcestershire; County Ground, New Road, Worcester	Lost	18 runs	D'Oliveira 113; Gifford 5-71
20	21 Aug 1976	Lancashire; Park Road Ground, Buxton	Won	15 runs	K Stevenson 5-47; Ratcliffe 5-46
21	28 Aug 1976	Nottinghamshire; Trent Bridge, Nottingham	Drawn		PJ Sharpe 112; White 6-61
22	1 Sep 1976	Gloucestershire; Phoenix County Ground, Bristol	Won	5 wickets	Mohammad 163 and 150; A Hill 126
23	8 Sep 1976	Hampshire; Queen's Park, Chesterfield	Drawn		M Hendrick 6-56; Jesty 5-48

=== John Player League ===
List of matches
No.	Date	V	Result	Margin	Notes
1	25 Apr 1976	Lancashire; Queen's Park, Chesterfield	Won	5 runs	
2	2 May 1976	Hampshire; Dean Park, Bournemouth	Lost	7 wickets	
3	23 May 1976	Nottinghamshire; Trent Bridge, Nottingham	Lost	7 wickets	
4	30 May 1976	Essex; Rutland Recreation Ground, Ilkeston	Lost	7 runs	A Ward 6-24
5	6 Jun 1976	Surrey; Kennington Oval	Lost	6 wickets	Butcher 103
6	13 Jun 1976	Sussex; Trent College Ground, Long Eaton	Lost	11 runs	
7	27 Jun 1976	Leicestershire; Grace Road, Leicester	Won	66 runs	
8	4 Jul 1976	Gloucestershire; Phoenix County Ground, Bristol	Won	10 wickets (Run rate)	PE Russell 5-26
9	11 Jul 1976	Somerset; Town Ground, Heanor	Lost	6 wickets	
10	18 Jul 1976	Kent; Cheriton Road Sports Ground, Folkestone	Lost	48 runs	
11	25 Jul 1976	Warwickshire; Queen's Park, Chesterfield	Lost	3 wickets	
12	1 Aug 1976	Yorkshire; Queen's Park, Chesterfield	Won	7 wickets	
13	8 Aug 1976	Middlesex; Lord's Cricket Ground, St John's Wood	Lost	7 wickets	
14	15 Aug 1976	Glamorgan; St Helen's, Swansea	Won	44 runs	
15	29 Aug 1976	Northamptonshire; Park Road Ground, Buxton	Won	85 runs	A Hill 120; PE Russell 6-10
16	5 Sep 1976	Worcestershire; Ind Coope Ground, Burton-on-Trent	Won	34 runs	

=== Gillette Cup ===
List of matches
No.	Date	V	Result	Margin	Notes
1st Round	26 Jun 1976	Lincolnshire; Rutland Recreation Ground, Ilkeston	Won	7 wickets	
2nd Round	14 Jul 1976	Surrey; Rutland Recreation Ground, Ilkeston	Won	67 runs	
Quarter Final	4 Aug 1976	Hampshire; County Ground, Southampton	Lost	47 runs	

=== Benson and Hedges Cup ===
List of matches
No.	Date	V	Result	Margin	Notes
Group A 1	24 Apr 1976	Glamorgan; Queen's Park, Chesterfield	Won	8 wickets	PJ Sharpe 111
Group A 2	3 May 1976	Hampshire; County Ground, Southampton	Won	4 wickets	
Group A 3	8 May 1976	Warwickshire; Queen's Park, Chesterfield	Lost	5 wickets	
Group A 4	15 May 1976	Lancashire; Trafalgar Road Ground, Southport	Lost	52 runs	M Hendrick 5-30; Wood 5-12

== Statistics ==
=== Competition batting averages ===
Name	County Championship						John Player League						Gillette Cup						B & H Cup					
Name	M	I	Runs	HS	Ave	100	M	I	Runs	HS	Ave	100	M	I	Runs	HS	Ave	100	M	I	Runs	HS	Ave	100
EJ Barlow	20	36	1035	217	28.75	2	16	15	545	88	36.33	0	3	3	69	55	23.00	0	4	4	121	69	30.25	0
JB Bolus							1	1	15	15	15.00	0							2	2	23	16	23.00	0
AJ Borrington	18	32	709	102*	27.26	1	16	16	248	62	17.71	0	3	3	41	28	20.50	0	4	3	83	68	27.66	0
H Cartwright	9	16	373	61*	24.86	0	15	13	223	52*	18.58	0	2	2	10	10	10.00	0	1	1	24	24	24.00	0
M Glenn	2	2	4	4*	4.00	0																		
AJ Harvey-Walker	4	8	157	56	22.42	0	1	1	3	3	3.00	0	1	1	11	11	11.00	0						
RGA Headley							13	13	448	83	37.33	0	3	3	97	48	32.33	0	2	2	21	17	10.50	0
M Hendrick	15	17	141	26	12.81	0	11	3	2	1	0.66	0	3	2	6	5*	6.00	0	4	1	12	12	12.00	0
A Hill	20	36	1179	160*	34.67	3	6	6	260	120	43.33	1	2	2	28	23	14.00	0	1	1	2	2	2.00	0
G Miller	17	29	572	51	21.18	0	13	11	164	32*	27.33	0	2	1	24	24	24.00	0	4	3	62	59*	31.00	0
A Morris	15	26	370	74	14.80	0	8	7	161	49	32.20	0							2	2	40	39	20.00	0
PE Russell	15	21	184	31*	11.50	0	11	5	39	19	13.00	0	1	0					4	1	22	22*		0
PJ Sharpe	19	34	891	126	26.20	2	12	12	210	97*	19.09	0	3	3	64	46	21.33	0	4	4	136	111*	45.33	1
K Stevenson	14	19	157	27*	13.08	0	7	4	9	6*	0	0	2	2	14	14	7.00	0						
FW Swarbrook	19	32	588	80	30.94	0	15	12	136	31	19.42	0	3	2	58	58*	58.00	0	4	3	27	20*	27.00	0
RS Swindell	1	2	0	0	0.00	0																		
RW Taylor	20	34	634	72*	21.13	0	16	13	116	27	11.60	0	3	2	52	41	52.00	0	4	2	52	31*	52.00	0
CJ Tunnicliffe							5	2	1	1*	1.00	0												
A Ward	12	11	42	9	5.25	0	10	4	14	8	3.50	0	2	1	0	0	0.00	0	4	1	1	1	1.00	0

=== Competition bowling averages ===
Name	County Championship					John Player League					Gillette Cup					B & H Cup				
Name	Balls	Runs	Wkts	Best	Ave	Balls	Runs	Wkts	Best	Ave	Balls	Runs	Wkts	Best	Ave	Balls	Runs	Wkts	Best	Ave
Eddie Barlow	1619	750	40	5-63	18.75	672	465	17	3-29	27.35	209	112	10	4-51	11.20	264	115	7	3-37	16.42
M Glenn	250	123	4	3-36	30.75															
M Hendrick	2325	933	36	6-40	25.91	452	302	9	1-10	33.55	168	62	7	4-35	8.85	258	119	15	5-30	7.93
G Miller	2557	1208	59	7-74	20.47	516	366	11	3-23	33.27	144	48	3	2-14	16.00	168	115	1	1-43	115.00
A Morris	18	13	0																	
PE Russell	1744	863	26	7-46	33.19	464	325	28	6-10	11.60	54	13	0			258	115	4	2-33	28.75
PJ Sharpe	20	11	1	1-11	11.00															
K Stevenson	1529	917	26	5-47	35.26	286	201	10	3-39	20.10	120	81	4	4-21	20.25					
FW Swarbrook	3349	1354	51	6-29	26.54	625	405	17	4-15	23.82	216	87	1	1-34	87.00	114	71	1	1-46	71.00
RS Swindell	42	21	0																	
CJ Tunnicliffe						194	130	2	1-31	65.00										
A Ward	1702	790	36	6-52	21.94	389	314	15	6-24	20.93	84	50	1	1-30	50.00	248	138	2	2-20	69.00

=== Wicket Keeping ===
Bob Taylor

County Championship Catches 47, Stumping 10
John Player League Catches 11, Stumping 4
Gillette Cup Catches 6, Stumping 2
Benson and Hedges Cup Catches 7, Stumping 1

== See also ==
- Derbyshire County Cricket Club seasons
- 1976 English cricket season
