= Derbyshire County Cricket Club in 1978 =

1978 season of an English cricket team

Derbyshire County Cricket Club seasons
1978 season
- Captain: Eddie Barlow
- County Championship: 14
- John Player League: 8
- Gillette Cup: Round 2
- Benson & Hedges Cup.: Runners-up
- Most runs: Alan Hill
- Most wickets: Eddie Barlow
- Most catches: Bob Taylor

Derbyshire County Cricket Club in 1978 was the cricket season when the English club Derbyshire had been playing for one hundred and seven years. They reached the final of the Benson & Hedges Cup. In the County Championship, they won three matches to finish fourteenth in their seventy fourth season in the Championship. They came eighth in the John Player League and did not progress beyond round 2 in the Gillette Cup.

== 1978 season ==
Derbyshire reached the final of the Benson and Hedges Cup, losing to Kent. They played twenty two matches in the County Championship, one against Cambridge University and one against the touring Pakistanis. They won three first class matches overall, all in the Championship. In the Sunday league Derbyshire won six of the first eight matches but then lost the remaining six that were played. They were knocked out in the second round of the Gillette Cup.

Eddie Barlow was in his second season as captain. A successful run in the Benson and Hedges cup saw Alan Hill as top scorer overall and Eddie Barlow taking most wickets overall. However, in the first class game alone, Peter Kirsten was top scorer and Mike Hendrick took most wickets.

== Matches ==
=== First Class ===
List of matches
No.	Date	V	Result	Margin	Notes
1	3 May 1978	Somerset; Ind Coope Ground, Burton-on-Trent	Drawn		
2	10 May 1978	Lancashire; Old Trafford, Manchester	Won	9 wickets	G Miller 5-43
3	20 May 1978	Pakistanis; Queen's Park, Chesterfield	Drawn		JG Wright 184
4	24 May 1978	Yorkshire; Abbeydale Park, Sheffield	Drawn		AJ Borrington 137
5	27 May 1978	Nottinghamshire; Trent Bridge, Nottingham	Lost	8 wickets	Hadlee 101 and 5-25; EJ Barlow 127; Cooper 5-40
6	31 May 1978	Leicestershire; County Ground, Derby	Lost	Innings and 10 runs	Steele 118
7	3 Jun 1978	Surrey; Rutland Recreation Ground, Ilkeston	Lost	48 runs	AJ Harvey-Walker 7-35; Pocock 5-58
8	10 Jun 1978	Glamorgan; Queen's Park, Chesterfield	Won	Innings and 20 runs	PN Kirsten 206
9	14 Jun 1978	Gloucestershire; Wagon Works Ground, Gloucester	Lost	Innings and 139 runs	Abbas 104; Proctor 122; Childs 5-24 and 6-44
10	17 Jun 1978	Cambridge University Cricket Club; FP Fenner's Ground, Cambridge	Drawn		Fosh 109
11	24 Jun 1978	Leicestershire; Grace Road, Leicester	Drawn		
12	28 Jun 1978	Northamptonshire; County Ground, Northampton	Lost	Innings and 40 runs	Cook 155; Steele 130, 6-36 and 5-39
13	1 Jul 1978	Sussex; Queen's Park, Chesterfield	Drawn		
14	8 Jul 1978	Kent; Mote Park, Maidstone	Lost	8 wickets	Underwood 5-41 and 6-38; AJ Mellor 5-52
15	12 Jul 1978	Northamptonshire; County Ground, Derby	Drawn		M Hendrick 5-42
16	15 Jul 1978	Worcestershire; County Ground, New Road, Worcester	Drawn		A Hill 153
17	26 Jul 1978	Hampshire; County Ground, Derby	Drawn		
18	29 Jul 1978	Yorkshire; Queen's Park, Chesterfield	Drawn		
19	9 Aug 1978	Lancashire; Queen's Park, Chesterfield	Drawn		
20	12 Aug 1978	Middlesex; Lord's Cricket Ground, St John's Wood	Lost	Innings and 77 runs	Gatting 128; Daniel 5-42; Selvey 5-74 and 6-26
21	19 Aug 1978	Essex; County Ground, Derby	Drawn		
22	26 Aug 1978	Nottinghamshire; County Ground, Derby	Won	16 runs	Cooper 6-32; G Miller 5-46
23	30 Aug 1978	Essex; Southchurch Park, Southend-on-Sea	Drawn		M Hendrick 5-32; Lever 6-55; East 5-70
24	6 Sep 1978	Warwickshire; Edgbaston, Birmingham	Drawn		

=== John Player League ===
List of matches
No.	Date	V	Result	Margin	Notes
1	30 Apr 1978	Gloucestershire; County Ground, Derby	Won	Faster rate	
2	7 May 1978	Sussex; County Ground, Derby	Won	41 runs	
3	14 May 1978	Yorkshire; Fartown, Huddersfield	Won	54 runs	
4	28 May 1978	Nottinghamshire; Trent Bridge, Nottingham	Lost	2 wickets	
5	4 Jun 1978	Surrey; Trent College Ground, Long Eaton	No result		
6	18 Jun 1978	Hampshire; Dean Park, Bournemouth	Won	43 runs	
7	2 Jul 1978	Glamorgan; Queen's Park, Chesterfield	Won	18 runs	
8	9 Jul 1978	Kent; Mote Park, Maidstone	Won	15 runs	
9	16 Jul 1978	Worcestershire; County Ground, New Road, Worcester	Lost	9 wickets	
10	23 Jul 1978	Somerset; County Ground, Derby	Abandoned		
11	30 Jul 1978	Northamptonshire; County Ground, Northampton	Abandoned		
12	6 Aug 1978	Lancashire; Queen's Park, Chesterfield	Lost	7 wickets	
13	13 Aug 1978	Middlesex; Lord's Cricket Ground, St John's Wood	Lost	7 runs	
14	20 Aug 1978	Essex; County Ground, Derby	Lost	5 wickets	
15	27 Aug 1978	Warwickshire; Queen's Park, Chesterfield	Lost	7 wickets	
16	3 Sep 1978	Leicestershire; Grace Road, Leicester	Lost	6 wickets	

=== Gillette Cup ===
List of matches
No.	Date	V	Result	Margin	Notes
1st Round	5 Jul 1978	Worcestershire; County Ground, New Road, Worcester	Won	5 runs	EJ Barlow 5-30
2nd Round	19 Jul 1978	Middlesex; County Ground, Derby	Lost	33 runs	

=== Benson and Hedges Cup ===
List of matches
No.	Date	V	Result	Margin	Notes
Group A 1	22 Apr 1978	Warwickshire; Rutland Recreation Ground, Ilkeston	Won	66 runs	A Hill 102
Group A 2	29 Apr 1978	Lancashire; Old Trafford, Manchester	Won	2 wickets	
Group A 3	6 May 1978	Gloucestershire; Phoenix County Ground, Bristol	Won	25 runs	EJ Barlow 6-33
Group A 4	13 May 1978	Minor Counties West; County Ground, Derby	Won	4 wickets	
Quarter Final	7 Jun 1978	Middlesex; County Ground, Derby	Won	25 runs	
Semi Final	21 Jun 1978	Warwickshire; County Ground, Derby	Won	41 runs	
Final	22 Jul 1978	Kent; Lord's Cricket Ground, St John's Wood	Lost	6 wickets	

== Statistics ==
=== Competition batting averages ===
Name	County Championship						John Player League						Gillette Cup						B & H Cup					
Name	M	I	Runs	HS	Ave	100	M	I	Runs	HS	Ave	100	M	I	Runs	HS	Ave	100	M	I	Runs	HS	Ave	100
IS Anderson	6	10	140	75	15.55	0	2	2	27	21	13.50	0												
EJ Barlow	16	25	765	127	36.42	1	11	11	232	63	23.20	0	2	2	18	18	9.00	0	7	7	175	75	25.00	0
AJ Borrington	15	24	630	137	28.63	1	11	11	250	57*	25.00	0	1	1	10	10	10.00	0	7	7	136	77	19.42	0
H Cartwright	22	35	571	77*	17.84	0	14	14	303	63	25.25	0	2	2	4	4	2.00	0	7	7	118	56*	19.66	0
JMH Graham-Brown	10	16	166	28	11.85	0	5	3	26	15	8.66	0	1	1	1	1	1.00	0	2	2	11	10	5.50	0
AJ Harvey-Walker	8	12	150	61	15.00	0	5	5	99	62	24.75	0	1	1	3	3	3.00	0	1	1	6	6	6.00	0
M Hendrick	12	13	108	33	15.42	0	10	2	10	9	10.00	0	2	2	17	17	17.00	0	5	2	9	7	4.50	0
A Hill	22	38	836	153*	22.59	1	14	12	226	60	20.54	0	2	2	83	72	41.50	0	7	7	349	102*	58.16	1
PN Kirsten	19	33	1073	206*	37.00	1	11	11	216	88	19.63	0	2	2	6	6	3.00	0	5	5	100	41	20.00	0
JW Lister	3	6	137	48	22.83	0	1	1	0	0*		0												
AJ McLellan	12	14	27	11*	3.00	0	2	1	4	4*		0												
AJ Mellor	5	7	19	10*	3.80	0																		
G Miller	11	18	581	95	38.73	0	8	7	104	27	17.33	0	2	2	69	59*	69.00	0	7	7	123	39	17.57	0
A Morris	4	6	93	55	15.50	0	1	1	3	3*		0												
PE Russell	14	12	90	22	9.00	0	13	6	25	8*	12.50	0	2	2	34	27*	34.00	0	7	5	13	6*	6.50	0
FW Swarbrook	10	14	179	36*	17.90	0	8	8	58	18	11.60	0	1	1	9	9	9.00	0	4	3	31	17*	15.50	0
RW Taylor	10	12	136	32	12.36	0	8	4	38	17	12.66	0	2	2	41	25	20.50	0	7	6	20	10*	5.00	0
CJ Tunnicliffe	18	23	146	45	7.68	0	13	8	72	42	10.28	0	1	1	4	4	4.00	0	6	4	18	16*	6.00	0
J Walters	13	21	436	90	25.64	0	11	9	141	55*	23.50	0	1	1	3	3	3.00	0	2	1	2	2	2.00	0
RC Wincer	9	9	32	16*	5.33	0	3	2	0	0*	0.00	0							1	1	6	6*		0
JG Wright	3	5	42	28	8.40	0	3	3	117	64	39.00	0							2	2	36	20	18.00	0

=== Competition bowling averages ===
Name	County Championship					John Player League					Gillette Cup					B & H Cup				
Name	Balls	Runs	Wkts	Best	Ave	Balls	Runs	Wkts	Best	Ave	Balls	Runs	Wkts	Best	Ave	Balls	Runs	Wkts	Best	Ave
IS Anderson	258	150	2	1-24	75.00	11	9	0												
EJ Barlow	1289	528	24	4-34	22.00	355	258	18	3-17	14.33	140	77	8	5-30	9.62	364	212	18	6-33	11.77
JMH Graham-Brown	578	293	6	2-23	48.83	48	56	0												
AJ Harvey-Walker	618	296	12	7-35	24.66	14	12	0												
M Hendrick	2024	704	47	5-32	14.97	384	156	12	3-11	13.00	144	48	3	2-25	16.00	324	119	2	2-14	59.50
A Hill	12	14	0																	
PN Kirsten	1180	555	15	4-51	37.00	183	146	8	4-13	18.25	108	61	4	2-15	15.25	36	30	1	1-16	30.00
AJ Mellor	636	305	9	5-52	33.88															
G Miller	2066	809	30	5-43	26.96	235	166	11	4-22	15.09	126	47	1	1-21	47.00	396	176	6	2-29	29.33
A Morris	24	20	0																	
PE Russell	1312	400	21	4-23	19.04	456	295	12	4-11	24.58	144	74	2	1-28	37.00	450	190	9	3-28	21.11
FW Swarbrook	522	211	9	4-22	23.44											150	95	4	4-33	23.75
CJ Tunnicliffe	2478	1144	39	4-30	29.33	392	247	7	3-21	35.28	52	17	1	1-17	17.00	327	147	7	3-16	21.00
J Walters	978	489	15	3-70	32.60	128	109	2	1-14	54.50						60	30	2	2-30	15.00
RC Wincer	1108	627	18	4-42	34.83	127	92	1	1-24	92.00						42	29	0		

=== Wicket Keeping ===
Bob Taylor

County Championship Catches 24, Stumping 2
John Player League Catches 10, Stumping 1
Gillette Cup Catches 2, Stumping 1
Benson and Hedges Cup Catches 10, Stumping 1

== See also ==
- Derbyshire County Cricket Club seasons
- 1978 English cricket season
