= Derbyshire County Cricket Club in 1973 =

1973 season of an English cricket team

Derbyshire County Cricket Club seasons
1973 season
- Captain: Brian Bolus
- County Championship: 16
- John Player League: 12
- Gillette Cup: Round 2
- Benson & Hedges Cup: Group
- Most runs: Brian Bolus
- Most wickets: Srinivasaraghavan Venkataraghavan
- Most catches: Bob Taylor

Derbyshire County Cricket Club in 1973 was the cricket season when the English club Derbyshire had been playing for one hundred and two years. In the County Championship, they won two matches to finish sixteenth in their seventy-ninth season in the Championship. They won five matches in the John Player League to finish twelfth. They were eliminated in the first round of the Gillette Cup and did not progress beyond group level in the Benson & Hedges Cup.

== 1973 season ==
Derbyshire played 20 games in the County Championship, one match against Oxford University, and one match each against the touring New Zealanders and West Indians. They won three first class matches overall, two in the County Championship. Brian Bolus was in his first season as captain. Brian Bolus scored most runs overall, although Michael Page scored most in the County Championship. Srinivasaraghavan Venkataraghavan took most wickets.

== Matches ==
=== First Class ===
List of matches
No.	Date	V	Result	Margin	Notes
1	12 May 1973	Warwickshire; Queen's Park, Chesterfield	Lost	16 runs	M Hendrick 8-45; McVicar 5-58
2	16 May 1973	Essex; County Ground, Chelmsford	Lost	Innings and 28 runs	East 6-35 and 6-95
3	23 May 1973	New Zealanders; County Ground, Derby	Drawn		
4	26 May 1973	Northamptonshire; County Ground, Northampton	Drawn		Cottam 6-45
5	6 Jun 1973	Worcestershire; County Ground, Derby	Lost	5 wickets	Holder 5-29; M Hendrick 5-64
6	9 Jun 1973	Lancashire; Old Trafford, Manchester	Drawn		Lee 6-53
7	16 Jun 1973	Yorkshire; Queen's Park, Chesterfield	Drawn		Sharpe 110
8	20 Jun 1973	Oxford University; The University Parks, Oxford	Won	4 wickets	
9	23 Jun 1973	Middlesex; Ind Coope Ground, Burton-on-Trent	Drawn		Titmus 6-40
10	30 Jun 1973	Leicestershire; Grace Road, Leicester	Lost	2 wickets	S Venkataraghavan 7-100
11	4 Jul 1973	Glamorgan; Sophia Gardens, Cardiff	Won	56 runs	Nash 6-99; RS Swindell 5-52; S Venkataraghavan 6-67
12	7 Jul 1973	Kent; County Ground, Derby	Drawn		Luckhurst 215; Johnson 130
13	14 Jul 1973	Lancashire; Park Road Ground, Buxton	Drawn		
14	25 Jul 1973	Surrey; Queen's Park, Chesterfield	Lost	57 runs	Ahmed 117; Pocock 5-67
15	28 Jul 1973	Yorkshire; Bramall Lane, Sheffield	Lost	4 wickets	JB Bolus 138; M Hendrick 5-69
16	4 Aug 1973	Nottinghamshire; Rutland Recreation Ground, Ilkeston	Drawn		Sobers 100;
17	8 Aug 1973	Hampshire; United Services Recreation Ground, Portsmouth	Lost	10 wickets	Gilliat 103; RS Swindell 6-97; Sainsbury 5-41
18	11 Aug 1973	Somerset; Clarence Park, Weston-super-Mare	Lost	48 runs	FW Swarbrook 6-57; Cartwright 7-37 and 6-52
19	18 Aug 1973	Sussex; The Saffrons, Eastbourne	Won	95 runs	FW Swarbrook 6-53; S Venkataraghavan 6-78
20	22 Aug 1973	Gloucestershire; County Ground, Derby	Lost	150 runs	
21	25 Aug 1973	Leicestershire; County Ground, Derby	Lost	2 wickets	
22	29 Aug 1973	West Indians; Queen's Park, Chesterfield	Lost	163 runs	Lloyd 174; Ali 6-55
23	8 Sep 1973	Nottinghamshire; Trent Bridge, Nottingham	Drawn		Sobers 128; Harris 125; Edwards 5-44

=== John Player League ===
List of matches
No.	Date	V	Result	Margin	Notes
1	6 May 1973	Hampshire; County Ground, Derby	Abandoned		
2	13 May 1973	Warwickshire; Edgbaston, Birmingham	Abandoned		
3	20 May 1973	Essex; County Ground, Chelmsford	Lost	14 runs	
4	27 May 1973	Worcestershire; Tipton Road, Dudley	Lost	39 runs	
5	3 Jun 1973	Leicestershire; Ind Coope Ground, Burton-on-Trent	Lost	8 wickets	
6	24 Jun 1973	Middlesex; Queen's Park, Chesterfield	Won	1 run	
7	1 Jul 1973	Glamorgan; Park Road Ground, Buxton	Won	1 run	Nash 5-14
8	8 Jul 1973	Kent; Queen's Park, Chesterfield	Lost	5 wickets	
9	15 Jul 1973	Northamptonshire; County Ground, Northampton	No result		
10	22 Jul 1973	Yorkshire; North Marine Road Ground, Scarborough	Lost	87 runs	
11	29 Jul 1973	Surrey; County Ground, Derby	Won	68 runs	
12	5 Aug 1973	Lancashire; Old Trafford, Manchester	Lost	Faster rate	
13	12 Aug 1973	Somerset; Clarence Park, Weston-super-Mare	Lost	8 wickets	
14	19 Aug 1973	Sussex; The Saffrons, Eastbourne	Lost	4 wickets	Buss 5-36
15	2 Sep 1973	Gloucestershire; Queen's Park, Chesterfield	Won	11 runs	
16	9 Sep 1973	Nottinghamshire; County Ground, Derby	Won	16 runs	

=== Gillette Cup ===
List of matches
No.	Date	V	Result	Margin	Notes
1st Round	11 Jul 1973	Sussex; Queen's Park, Chesterfield	Lost	111 runs	

=== Benson and Hedges Cup ===
List of matches
No.	Date	V	Result	Margin	Notes
Group A 1	28 Apr 1973	Nottinghamshire; Queen's Park, Chesterfield	Lost	33 runs	
Group A 2	7 May 1973	Yorkshire; Park Avenue Cricket Ground, Bradford	Lost	5 wickets	
Group A 3	19 May 1973	Lancashire; Rutland Recreation Ground, Ilkeston	Lost	4 wickets	
Group A 4	2 Jun 1973	Minor Counties North; Tean Road Sports Ground, Cheadle	Won	5 wickets	

== Statistics ==
=== Competition batting averages ===
Name	County Championship						John Player League						Gillette Cup						B & H Cup					
Name	M	I	Runs	HS	Ave	100	M	I	Runs	HS	Ave	100	M	I	Runs	HS	Ave	100	M	I	Runs	HS	Ave	100
CJ Armishaw							4	2	8	7	4.00	0	1	1	0	0*		0						
JB Bolus	20	37	1084	138	32.84	1	14	14	317	79*	24.38	0	1	1	33	33	33.00	0	4	4	94	66	23.50	0
AJ Borrington	17	33	624	75	18.90	0	11	10	171	47*	19.00	0	1	1	1	1	1.00	0	2	2	17	10	8.50	0
IR Buxton	18	32	670	83	23.92	0	14	14	399	68	36.27	0	1	1	2	2	2.00	0	4	4	54	26	27.00	0
H Cartwright	14	26	348	63	13.92	0	11	11	155	76*	19.37	0							1	1	6	6*		0
RL Hanson	1	1	1	1*		0	1	1	2	2	2.00	0							1	0				
AJ Harvey-Walker	11	21	457	86	22.85	0	14	14	293	84	24.41	0	1	1	2	2	2.00	0	4	4	68	30	17.00	0
M Hendrick	17	19	193	46	12.06	0	14	9	70	17	11.66	0	1	1	11	11	11.00	0	4	3	50	32	25.00	0
A Hill	18	35	623	75	17.80	0	2	2	84	54	42.00	0												
CC Inman							3	3	52	46	17.33	0 0 1							4	4	51	33	12.75	0
G Miller	9	16	241	71	17.21	0	7	6	112	44	18.66	0	1	1	10	10	10.00	0						
MH Page	16	30	1200	96	46.15	0	7	7	57	22	8.14	0	1	1	13	13	13.00	0	4	4	77	47	19.25	0
FE Rumsey							14	6	7	3	2.33	0	1	1	1	1	1.00	0	4	2	0	0*	0.00	0
FW Swarbrook	20	34	444	65*	15.31	0	1	1	12	12	12.00	0							1	1	5	5	5.00	0
RS Swindell	7	12	71	23*	7.88	0																		
RW Taylor	19	34	661	61*	22.03	0	13	9	87	24	10.87	0	1	1	0	0	0.00	0	3	3	35	20	11.66	0
CJ Tunnicliffe	8	10	77	34*	25.66	0	8	4	53	27*	26.50	0							1	0				
S Venkataraghavan	20	34	424	51	17.66	0	14	7	45	16	7.50	0	1	1	10	10	10.00	0	4	3	6	4	2.00	0
A Ward	5	8	55	36	9.16	0	2	1	3	3	3.00	0 0 0							3	2	7	7*	7.00	0

=== Competition bowling averages ===
Name	County Championship					John Player League					Gillette Cup					B & H Cup				
Name	Balls	Runs	Wkts	Best	Ave	Balls	Runs	Wkts	Best	Ave	Balls	Runs	Wkts	Best	Ave	Balls	Runs	Wkts	Best	Ave
CJ Armishaw						144	104	4	4-31	26.00	72	52	1	1-52	52.00					
IR Buxton	2115	813	24	4-42	33.87	528	390	15	4-21	26.00	72	27	4	4-27	6.75	164	64	5	2-6	12.80
AJ Harvey-Walker	342	152	7	2-8	21.71	12	10	0												
M Hendrick	2856	1191	58	8-45	20.53	615	302	10	2-15	30.20	72	38	2	2-38	19.00	246	105	4	2-38	26.25
G Miller	324	160	6	2-33	26.66	15	30	0												
MH Page	6	9	0			4	4	0								2	1	0		
FE Rumsey						567	347	18	4-33	19.27	72	45	0			264	86	11	4-19	7.81
FW Swarbrook	2987	1461	43	6-53	33.97	12	18	1	1-18	18.00						30	19	0		
RS Swindell	834	469	11	6-97	42.63															
RW Taylor	1	4	0																	
CJ Tunnicliffe	1007	546	10	3-96	54.60	346	294	6	2-46	49.00						50	31	0		
S Venkataraghavan	4586	2095	69	7-100	30.36	582	396	17	3-31	23.29	72	32	0			264	121	3	2-32	40.33
A Ward	499	290	7	3-22	41.42	72	27	1	1-22	27.00 0						174	74	6	4-39	12.33

=== Wicket Keeping ===
- Bob Taylor

County Championship Catches 33, Stumping 9
John Player League Catches 7, Stumping 5
Gillette Cup Catches 3, Stumping 0
Benson and Hedges Cup Catches 1, Stumping 0

== See also ==
- Derbyshire County Cricket Club seasons
- 1973 English cricket season
