= Alan McLellan =

English cricketer (born 1958)

Personal information
- Full name: Alan James McLellan
- Born: 2 September 1958 (age 68); Ashton-under-Lyne, Lancashire, England
- Batting: Right-handed
- Role: Wicket-keeper

Domestic team information
- Years: Team
- 1978–1979: Derbyshire

Career statistics
Competition	First-class	List A
Matches	26	6
Runs scored	99	5
Batting average	6.18	–
100s/50s	–/–	–/–
Top score	41	4*
Catches/stumpings	41/2	5/–
- Source: Cricinfo, 15 June 2022

Alan James McLellan (born 2 September 1958) is a former English cricketer who played first-class cricket for Derbyshire between 1978 and 1979.

McLellan was born at Ashton-under-Lyne, Lancashire. He made his first-class debut for Derbyshire during the 1978 season against the touring Pakistanis, taking two catches, before making his first appearance in the 1978 County Championship. McLellan played steadily throughout the County Championships of 1978 and 1979 before finding himself out of the team. His highest career innings of 41 came against Hampshire in July 1979.

McLellan was a right-handed batsman and a wicket-keeper. McLellan was a tailender batsman along with team-mate Robert Wincer throughout his short period in first-class cricket.
