= Armishaw =

Armishaw is a surname. Notable people with the surname include:

- Christopher Armishaw (1952–2016), English cricketer
- Eric Armishaw (1905–1971), New Zealand politician and boxing referee
