= Leslie Bradbury =

English cricketer (1938–2020)

Leslie Bradbury (19 April 1938 – May 2020) was an English cricketer who played first-class cricket for Derbyshire in 1971.

Bradbury was born at Matlock, Derbyshire. His career for Derbyshire started in the Second XI team in 1968, when he debuted against Leicestershire. With four wickets on his debut, and an economical return, he served the Second XI well for the next three years without securing a place in the first team.

His only first-class appearance came in the 1971 season in May against Yorkshire when taking the position of number 11 batsman from team-mate Mike Hendrick, he bowled safely, but did not bat during the match.

Bradbury was a right-handed batsman and a right-arm medium-fast bowler, and wicket-keeper. He continued in the Second XI until 1973 maintaining a position of tailender batsman until the end of the 1973 season.
