= Derbyshire County Cricket Club in 1971 =

English cricket season

Derbyshire County Cricket Club seasons
1971 season
- Captain: Ian Buxton
- County Championship: 17
- John Player League: 11
- Gillette Cup: Round 2
- Most runs: Ian Hall
- Most wickets: Philip Russell
- Most catches: Bob Taylor

Derbyshire County Cricket Club in 1971 was the centenary cricket season of the English club Derbyshire which had first played in 1871. In the County Championship, they won one match to finish seventeenth in their seventy-seventh season in the Championship. They won seven matches in the John Player League to finish eleventh. They were eliminated in Round 2 of the Gillette Cup.

== 1971 season ==
Derbyshire played 24 games in the County Championship, one match against Oxford University and one match against the touring Pakistanis. They won one match overall and managed 19 draws in the County Championship. Ian Buxton was in his second season as captain. Ian Hall scored most runs and Philip Russell took most wickets.

Anthony Borrington and Ashley Harvey-Walker, who made their first-class debuts in the season, went on to play for several more seasons for Derbyshire. Harvey-Walker achieved a unique distinction by scoring a century in his debut match. Another newcomer, David Wilde, played in this and the following season. Leslie Bradbury made his single first-class cricket appearance in one match for Derbyshire. Harold Cartwright, only played one-day cricket for Derbyshire in this his initial season, but stayed with the club for several seasons

== Matches ==
=== First Class ===
List of matches
| No. | Date | V | Result | Margin | Notes |
|---|---|---|---|---|---|
| 1 | 1 May 1971 | Middlesex; County Ground, Derby | Drawn | | Parfitt 103; Latchman 6–72 |
| 2 | 5 May 1971 | Leicestershire; Queen's Park, Chesterfield | Drawn | | Inman 147 |
| 3 | 8 May 1971 | Gloucestershire; Ashley Down Ground, Bristol | Drawn | | |
| 4 | 15 May 1971 | Warwickshire; Edgbaston, Birmingham | Drawn | | PJK Gibbs 127; Lance Gibbs 6–54 |
| 5 | 22 May 1971 | Yorkshire; Queen's Park, Chesterfield | Drawn | | |
| 6 | 26 May 1971 | Somerset; County Ground, Derby | Drawn | | CP Wilkins 113; A Jones 5–26 |
| 7 | 29 May 1971 | Essex; Ind Coope Ground, Burton-on-Trent | Lost | Innings and 41 runs | Hobbs 5–38 |
| 8 | 5 Jun 1971 | Kent; Rectory Field, Blackheath | Won | 93 runs | MH Page 111; FW Swarbrook 5–55 |
| 9 | 9 Jun 1971 | Essex; Valentine's Park, Ilford | Drawn | | |
| 10 | 16 Jun 1971 | Worcestershire; Queen's Park, Chesterfield | Drawn | | |
| 11 | 19 Jun 1971 | Hampshire; County Ground, Derby | Drawn | | |
| 12 | 23 Jun 1971 | Oxford University; Ind Coope Ground, Burton-on-Trent | Lost | 2 wickets | AJ Harvey-Walker 110 |
| 13 | 26 Jun 1971 | Nottinghamshire; Trent Bridge, Nottingham | Drawn | | Harris 114 |
| 14 | 3 Jul 1971 | Pakistanis; Queen's Park, Chesterfield | Lost | 8 wickets | Intikhab Alam 5–155; Pervez Saijad 6–71 |
| 15 | 7 Jul 1971 | Kent; County Ground, Derby | Drawn | | Steele 195; Balderstone 6–84 |
| 16 | 10 Jul 1971 | Leicestershire; Grace Road, Leicester | Drawn | | |
| 17 | 14 Jul 1971 | Yorkshire; North Marine Road Ground, Scarborough | Drawn | | Geoffrey Boycott 133 |
| 18 | 17 Jul 1971 | Lancashire; Park Road Ground, Buxton | Drawn | | Engineer 141; Hughes 5–96 |
| 19 | 24 Jul 1971 | Hampshire; May's Bounty, Basingstoke | Drawn | | |
| 20 | 31 Jul 1971 | Nottinghamshire; Rutland Recreation Ground, Ilkeston | Drawn | | White 7–41 |
| 21 | 7 Aug 1971 | Sussex; County Ground, Hove | Drawn | | |
| 22 | 14 Aug 1971 | Northamptonshire; County Ground, Northampton | Drawn | | PJK Gibbs; E Smith 5–64; Breakwell 5–26 |
| 23 | 21 Aug 1971 | Gloucestershire; Queen's Park, Chesterfield | Lost | 43 runs | Proctor 167; CP Wilkins 111; Mortimore 6–59 |
| 24 | 25 Aug 1971 | Lancashire; Old Trafford, Manchester | Lost | 4 wickets | CP Wilkins 156 |
| 25 | 28 Aug 1971 | Glamorgan; County Ground, Derby | Drawn | | |
| 26 | 1 Sep 1971 | Surrey; Kennington Oval | Lost | 40 runs | Storey 164; Intikhab Alam 5–63 |

=== John Player League ===
List of matches
| No. | Date | V | Result | Margin | Notes |
|---|---|---|---|---|---|
| 1 | 2 May 1971 | Yorkshire; St George's Road, Harrogate | Won | 1 wicket | |
| 2 | 9 May 1971 | Gloucestershire; Ashley Down Ground, Bristol | Lost | 20 runs | CP Wilkins 5–42 |
| 3 | 16 May 1971 | Somerset; Rutland Recreation Ground, Ilkeston | Lost | 9 runs | |
| 4 | 16 May 1971 | Essex; Park Road Ground, Buxton | Lost | 22 runs | Brian Taylor 100 |
| 5 | 30 May 1971 | Nottinghamshire; Queen's Park, Chesterfield | Won | 9 runs | |
| 6 | 6 Jun 1971 | Leicestershire; Grace Road, Leicester | Lost | Faster rate | |
| 7 | 20 Jun 1971 | Lancashire; Old Trafford, Manchester | Lost | 6 wickets | |
| 8 | 27 Jun 1971 | Kent; County Ground, Derby | Won | 2 runs | |
| 9 | 4 Jul 1971 | Worcestershire; County Ground, New Road, Worcester | Lost | Faster rate | |
| 10 | 11 Jul 1971 | Northamptonshire; Queen's Park, Chesterfield | Won | 21 runs | |
| 11 | 25 Jul 1971 | Hampshire; County Ground, Southampton | Lost | 121 runs | |
| 12 | 1 Aug 1971 | Warwickshire; County Ground, Derby | Lost | 2 wickets | |
| 13 | 8 Aug 1971 | Sussex; County Ground, Hove | Won | 3 wickets | |
| 14 | 15 Aug 1971 | Middlesex; County Ground, Derby | Won | 3 runs | |
| 15 | 29 Aug 1971 | Glamorgan; Queen's Park, Chesterfield | No Result | | |
| 16 | 5 Sep 1971 | Surrey; Kennington Oval | Won | 24 runs | |

=== Gillette Cup ===
List of matches
| No. | Date | V | Result | Margin | Notes |
|---|---|---|---|---|---|
| 1st Round | 12 Jun 1971 | Leicestershire; Grace Road, Leicester | Lost | 1 wicket | |

== Statistics ==
=== Competition batting averages ===
| Name | County Championship | | | | | | John Player League | | | | | | Gillette Cup | | | | | |
| Name | M | I | Runs | HS | Ave | 100 | M | I | Runs | HS | Ave | 100 | M | I | Runs | HS | Ave | 100 |
|---|---|---|---|---|---|---|---|---|---|---|---|---|---|---|---|---|---|---|
| AJ Borrington | 3 | 4 | 123 | 70 | 30.75 | 0 | 6 | 6 | 114 | 59 | 19.00 | 0 | 1 | 1 | 22 | 22 | 22.00 | 0 |
| L Bradbury | 1 | 0 | 0 | 0 | 0 | 0 | | | | | | | | | | | | |
| IR Buxton | 24 | 38 | 859 | 89 | 26.03 | 0 | 16 | 16 | 400 | 71* | 36.36 | 0 | 1 | 1 | 0 | 0 | 0.00 | 0 |
| H Cartwright | | | | | | | 9 | 9 | 78 | 24 | 11.14 | 0 | 1 | 1 | 21 | 21 | 21.00 | 0 |
| TJP Eyre | 12 | 13 | 106 | 29* | 13.25 | 0 | 6 | 4 | 21 | 10 | 5.25 | 0 | | | | | | |
| PJK Gibbs | 21 | 41 | 1194 | 127 | 31.42 | 2 | 14 | 14 | 292 | 56 | 20.85 | 0 | | | | | | |
| IW Hall | 24 | 45 | 1436 | 95 | 35.02 | 0 | 10 | 10 | 137 | 38 | 13.70 | 0 | 1 | 1 | 32 | 32 | 32.00 | 0 |
| JF Harvey | 24 | 39 | 1025 | 94 | 29.28 | 0 | 16 | 16 | 438 | 67 | 27.37 | 0 | 1 | 1 | 3 | 3 | 3.00 | 0 |
| AJ Harvey-Walker | 2 | 4 | 103 | 35 | 25.75 | 0 | 9 | 9 | 210 | 55 | 23.33 | 0 | | | | | | |
| M Hendrick | 12 | 11 | 53 | 14 | 5.88 | 0 | 8 | 5 | 17 | 10* | 4.25 | 0 | 1 | 1 | 1 | 1 | 1.00 | 0 |
| MH Page | 21 | 38 | 1050 | 111 | 30.88 | 1 | 7 | 7 | 57 | 19 | 8.14 | 0 | 1 | 1 | 24 | 24 | 24.00 | 0 |
| FE Rumsey | | | | | | | 15 | 7 | 7 | 5* | 1.75 | 0 | 1 | 1 | 2 | 2* | 0 | 0 |
| PE Russell | 20 | 24 | 317 | 55* | 18.64 | 0 | 15 | 11 | 72 | 23 | 10.28 | 0 | 1 | 1 | 1 | 1 | 1.00 | 0 |
| DHK Smith | | | | | | | 1 | 1 | 3 | 3 | 3.00 | 0 | | | | | | |
| E Smith | 12 | 12 | 72 | 19* | 9.00 | 0 | 1 | 1 | 12 | 12 | 12.00 | 0 | | | | | | |
| FW Swarbrook | 21 | 26 | 243 | 37 | 16.20 | 0 | 1 | 0 | | | | 0 | | | | | | |
| RW Taylor | 21 | 31 | 538 | 74* | 25.61 | 0 | 14 | 13 | 88 | 21* | 11.00 | 0 | 1 | 1 | 29 | 29* | 0 | 0 |
| A Ward | 19 | 17 | 87 | 17* | 8.70 | 0 | 11 | 7 | 23 | 9* | 4.60 | 0 | | | | | | |
| D Wilde | 3 | 4 | 1 | 1 | 0.33 | 0 | 1 | 0 | | | | 0 | | | | | | |
| CP Wilkins | 24 | 43 | 1362 | 156 | 34.92 | 3 | 16 | 16 | 383 | 74* | 25.53 | 0 | 1 | 1 | 51 | 51 | 51.00 | 0 |

=== Competition bowling averages ===
| Name | County Championship | | | | | John Player League | | | | | Gillette Cup | | | | |
| Name | Balls | Runs | Wkts | Best | Ave | Balls | Runs | Wkts | Best | Ave | Balls | Runs | Wkts | Best | Ave |
|---|---|---|---|---|---|---|---|---|---|---|---|---|---|---|---|
| AJ Borrington | 6 | 7 | 0 | | | | | | | | | | | | |
| L Bradbury | 90 | 53 | 1 | 1–53 | 53.00 0 0 | | | | | | | | | | |
| IR Buxton | 1862 | 792 | 22 | 3–55 | 36.00 | 588 | 398 | 19 | 3–20 | 20.94 | 72 | 31 | 1 | 1–31 | 31.00 |
| TJP Eyre | 1457 | 751 | 20 | 3–30 | 37.55 | 278 | 206 | 14 | 3–21 | 14.71 | | | | | |
| M Hendrick | 1362 | 624 | 19 | 4–44 | 32.84 | 330 | 223 | 9 | 3–28 | 24.77 | 72 | 37 | 3 | 3–37 | 12.33 |
| MH Page | 12 | 2 | 1 | 1–0 | 2.00 0 0 | | | | | | | | | | |
| FE Rumsey | | | | | | 637 | 355 | 16 | 3–12 | 22.18 | 72 | 34 | 3 | 3–34 | 11.33 |
| PE Russell | 3553 | 1646 | 58 | 4–31 | 28.37 | 594 | 426 | 18 | 4–22 | 23.66 | 69 | 35 | 1 | 1–35 | 35.00 |
| E Smith | 1870 | 934 | 23 | 5–64 | 40.60 1 0 | | | | | | | | | | |
| FW Swarbrook | 3443 | 1673 | 54 | 5–55 | 30.98 | 48 | 33 | 2 | 2–33 | 16.50 | | | | | |
| A Ward | 2900 | 1475 | 57 | 4–47 | 25.87 | 492 | 342 | 9 | 2–16 | 38.00 | | | | | |
| D Wilde | 385 | 234 | 7 | 3–76 | 33.42 | 48 | 43 | 0 | | | | | | | |
| CP Wilkins | 744 | 432 | 10 | 3–51 | 43.20 | 231 | 209 | 8 | 5–42 | 26.12 | 66 | 51 | 0 | | |

=== Wicket Keeping ===
- Bob Taylor

County Championship Catches 45, Stumping 8
John Player League Catches 5, Stumping 3
Gillette Cup Catches 1, Stumping 0

== See also ==
- Derbyshire County Cricket Club seasons
- 1971 English cricket season
