= 1979 Cricket World Cup Group A =

| Pos | Team | Pld | W | L | T | NR | Pts | RR |
|---|---|---|---|---|---|---|---|---|
| 1 | England | 3 | 3 | 0 | 0 | 0 | 12 | 3.066 |
| 2 | Pakistan | 3 | 2 | 1 | 0 | 0 | 8 | 3.602 |
| 3 | Australia | 3 | 1 | 2 | 0 | 0 | 4 | 3.164 |
| 4 | Canada | 3 | 0 | 3 | 0 | 0 | 0 | 1.606 |

Source: ESPNcricinfo

== Australia vs England ==
9 June 1979
Scorecard

| Australia; 159/9 (60 overs) | v | England; 160/4 (47.1 overs) |
| Andrew Hilditch 47 (108); Geoffrey Boycott 2/15 (6 overs) | | Graham Gooch 53 (96); Trevor Laughlin 2/38 (9.1 overs) |

England won by 6 wickets
Lord's, London, England
Umpires: David Constant (Eng) and Barrie Meyer (Eng)
Player of the match: Graham Gooch (Eng)

== Canada vs Pakistan ==
9 June 1979
Scorecard

| Canada; 139/9 (60 overs) | v | Pakistan; 140/2 (40.1 overs) |
| Glenroy Sealy 45 (110); Sarfraz Nawaz 3/26 (10 overs) | | Sadiq Mohammad 57* (122); John Valentine 1/18 (9 overs) |

Pakistan won by 8 wickets
Headingley, Leeds, England
Umpires: Dickie Bird (Eng) and Alan Whitehead (Eng)
Player of the match: Sadiq Mohammad (Pak)

== Pakistan vs Australia ==
13, 14 June 1979
Scorecard

| Pakistan; 286/7 (60 overs) | v | Australia; 197 (57.1 overs) |
| Asif Iqbal 61 (57); Gary Cosier 3/54 (12 overs) | | Andrew Hilditch 72 (129); Sikander Bakht 3/34 (11 overs) |

Pakistan won by 89 runs
Trent Bridge, Nottingham, England
Umpires: Dickie Bird (Eng) and Ken Palmer (Eng)
Player of the match: Asif Iqbal (Pak)

- Reserve day used

== Canada vs England ==
14 June 1979
Scorecard

| Canada; 45 (40.3 overs) | v | England; 46/2 (13.5 overs) |
| Franklyn Dennis 21 (99); Chris Old 4/8 (10 overs) | | Graham Gooch 21* (31); Robert Callender 1/14 (6 overs) |

England won by 8 wickets
Old Trafford, Manchester, England
Umpires: John Langridge (Eng) and Barrie Meyer (Eng)
Player of the match: Chris Old (Eng)

- Reserve day used; June 13 washed out.

== Canada vs Australia ==
16 June 1979
Scorecard

| Canada; 105 (33.2 overs) | v | Australia; 106/3 (26 overs) |
| John Vaughan 29 (43); Alan Hurst 5/21 (10 overs) | | Kim Hughes 27 (40); Cornelius Henry 2/27 (10 overs) |

Australia won by 7 wickets
Edgbaston, Birmingham, England
Umpires: David Constant (Eng) and John Langridge (Eng)
Player of the match: Alan Hurst (Aus)

== England vs Pakistan ==
16 June 1979
Scorecard

| England; 165/9 (60 overs) | v | Pakistan; 151 (56 overs) |
| Graham Gooch 33 (90); Majid Khan 3/27 (12 overs) | | Asif Iqbal 51 (104); Mike Hendrick 4/15 (12 overs) |

England won by 14 runs
Headingley, Leeds, England
Umpires: Lloyd Budd (Eng) and David Evans (Eng)
Player of the match: Mike Hendrick (Eng)
