= Prudential Cup =

The Prudential Cup was the sponsored title of the first three men's Cricket World Cups:

- 1975 Cricket World Cup
- 1979 Cricket World Cup
- 1983 Cricket World Cup
