= Derbyshire County Cricket Club in 1981 =

Derbyshire County Cricket Club
1981 season
- Captain: Geoff Miller
- County Championship: 12
- John Player League: 4
- National Westminster Bank Trophy: Winners
- Benson & Hedges Cup.: Group
- Most runs: Peter Kirsten
- Most wickets: Paul Newman

Derbyshire County Cricket Club in 1981 represents cricket season when the English club Derbyshire had been playing for one hundred and ten years. It was the season when they won National Westminster Bank Trophy. They won ten matches in the John Player League to finish fourth. In the County Championship, they won four matches to finish twelfth in their seventy-seventh season in the Championship. They were eliminated at group level in the Benson & Hedges Cup.

== 1981 season ==
Derbyshire played 22 games in the County Championship, and one match against the touring Australians of which they won four altogether Geoff Miller was in his third season as captain. Peter Kirsten was top scorer overall, in the County Championship and in the NWB Trophy, although John Wright scored most in the John Player League. Paul Newman and David Steele tied on 46 for most wickets in the County Championship, although Newman took an extra first class wicket against the Australians. Barry Wood took most wickets in the John Player League, and Colin Tunnicliffe most wickets in the NWB Trophy.

The club took on two wicket keepers in the season Michael Deakin as a stop gap and Bernie Maher who saw several years service with the club. Another player making his debut was Dallas Moir who went on to play several seasons for Derbyshire.

== Matches ==
=== First Class ===
List of matches
No.	Date	V	Result	Margin	Notes
1	6 May 1981	Leicestershire; Grace Road, Leicester	Drawn		Briers 101; B Wood 123; L Taylor 7-28
2	13 May 1981	Surrey; Kennington Oval	Drawn		Clinton 123
3	23 May 1981	Nottinghamshire; County Ground, Derby	Abandoned		
4	27 May 1981	Northamptonshire; County Ground, Northampton	Drawn		CJ Tunnicliffe 5-34
5	6 Jun 1981	Warwickshire; County Ground, Derby	Drawn		Amiss 109 and 127; DS Steele 6-77
6	10 Jun 1981	Australians; County Ground, Derby	Drawn		JG Wright 144
7	13 Jun 1981	Essex; County Ground, Derby	Drawn		PG Newman 5-51
8	17 Jun 1981	Yorkshire; Abbeydale Park, Sheffield	Drawn		Lumb 145; Moxon 111; A Hill 101; RW Taylor 100
9	20 Jun 1981	Northamptonshire; County Ground, Derby	Lost	9 wickets	JG Wright 110; PN Kirsten 114; Cook 120; Larkins 126
10	1 Jul 1981	Lancashire; Queen's Park, Chesterfield	Drawn		Kennedy 180; B Wood 127; Simmons 5-39
11	4 Jul 1981	Worcestershire; Queen's Park, Chesterfield	Won	3 runs	Pridgeon 5-63; Patel 100; JG Wright 141; B Wood 153 Younis Ahmed 107; M Hendrick 5-41
12	15 Jul 1981	Hampshire; United Services Recreation Ground, Portsmouth	Lost	Innings and 32 runs	Greenidge 109
13	18 Jul 1981	Somerset; County Ground, Taunton	Drawn		PN Kirsten 228;DS Steele 137; Richards 130
14	25 Jul 1981	Kent; County Ground, Derby	Won	9 wickets	Benson 108; Tavare 156; DS Steele 7-53
15	29 Jul 1981	Gloucestershire; County Ground, Derby	Won	Innings and 26 runs	CJ Tunnicliffe 5-40; Childs 5-43
16	1 Aug 1981	Essex; County Ground, Chelmsford	Lost	Innings and 60 runs	
17	8 Aug 1981	Leicestershire; County Ground, Derby	Lost	Innings and 27 runs	DS Steele 7-85; L Taylor 6-19
18	12 Aug 1981	Sussex; The Saffrons, Eastbourne	Lost	5 wickets	Imran Khan 107 and 5-52
19	15 Aug 1981	Glamorgan; St Helen's, Swansea	Won	Innings and 7 runs	DS Steele 5-62
20	22 Aug 1981	Yorkshire; Queen's Park, Chesterfield	Lost	6 wickets	JG Wright 150; Geoffrey Boycott 122
21	26 Aug 1981	Lancashire; Stanley Park, Blackpool	Drawn		PN Kirsten 204; Lloyd 146
22	29 Aug 1981	Nottinghamshire; Trent Bridge, Nottingham	Lost	9 wickets	Hemmings 7-59 and 6-70; CJ Tunnicliffe 5-75
23	12 Sep 1981	Middlesex; County Ground, Derby	Drawn		Mike Brearley 145; Mike Gatting 186; A Hill 107; Edmonds 6-93

=== John Player League ===
List of matches
No.	Date	V	Result	Margin	Notes
1	10 May 1981	Lancashire; Old Trafford, Manchester	Won	Faster scoring rate	
2	24 May 1981	Nottinghamshire; County Ground, Derby	Abandoned		
3	31 May 1981	Surrey; Kennington Oval	Lost	3 wickets	
4	14 Jun 1981	Hampshire; County Ground, Derby	Won	5 wickets	
5	21 Jun 1981	Warwickshire; Edgbaston, Birmingham	Won	42 runs	
6	28 Jun 1981	Gloucestershire; Wagon Works Ground, Gloucester	Won	9 wickets	
7	5 Jul 1981	Worcestershire; Queen's Park, Chesterfield	Won	8 wickets	
8	19 Jul 1981	Somerset; County Ground, Taunton	Lost	7 wickets	
9	26 Jul 1981	Kent; County Ground, Derby	Won	18 runs	
10	2 Aug 1981	Essex; County Ground, Chelmsford	Lost	32 runs	
11	9 Aug 1981	Leicestershire; County Ground, Derby	Won	23 runs	
12	16 Aug 1981	Glamorgan; St Helen's, Swansea	Won	5 wickets	
13	23 Aug 1981	Yorkshire; Queen's Park, Chesterfield	Lost	71 runs	Athey 5-35
14	30 Aug 1981	Northamptonshire; County Ground, Derby	Won	38 runs	CJ Tunnicliffe 5-24
15	6 Sep 1981	Sussex; County Ground, Hove	Lost	5 wickets	
16	13 Sep 1981	Middlesex; County Ground, Derby	Won	6 wickets	

=== National Westminster Bank Trophy ===
List of matches
No.	Date	V	Result	Margin	Notes
1st Round	11 Jul 1981	Suffolk; Victory Ground, Bury St Edmunds	Won	171 runs	
2nd Round	22 Jul 1981	Worcestershire; County Ground, New Road, Worcester	Won	4 wickets	CJ Tunnicliffe 5-50
Quarter Final	5 Aug 1981	Nottinghamshire; County Ground, Derby	Won	23 runs	
Semi Final	19 Aug 1981	Essex; County Ground, Derby	Won	Losing fewer wickets	
Final	5 Sep 1981	Northamptonshire; Lord's Cricket Ground, St John's Wood	Won	Losing fewer wickets	Cook 111

=== Benson and Hedges Cup ===
List of matches
No.	Date	V	Result	Margin	Notes
Group B 1	9 May 1981	Yorkshire; County Ground, Derby	Lost	1 wicket	Bairstow 103; CJ Tunnicliffe 5-24
Group B 2	16 May 1981	Warwickshire; Edgbaston, Birmingham	No Result		
Group B 3	19 May 1981	Scotland; County Ground, Derby	Won	7 wickets	
Group B 4	21 May 1981	Lancashire; Old Trafford, Manchester	Won	2 wickets	

== Statistics ==
=== Competition batting averages ===
Name	County Championship						John Player League						NWB Trophy						B & H Cup					
Name	M	I	Runs	HS	Ave	100	M	I	Runs	HS	Ave	100	M	I	Runs	HS	Ave	100	M	I	Runs	HS	Ave	100
S Anderson	10	13	92	44	9.20	0	1	0																
KJ Barnett	16	21	413	67*	24.29	0	15	13	205	35	18.63	0	5	5	136	59	45.33	0	4	2	24	17	12.00	0
AJ Borrington													1	1	0	0	0.00	0						
KG Brooks							1	1	12	12	12.00	0							1	1	3	3	3.00	0
MJ Deakin	4	6	45	15	7.50	0	2	0																
M Hendrick	11	9	81	21	13.50	0	10	4	20	12*	20.00	0	4	0					4	2	2	2*	0	0
A Hill	21	30	936	107	42.54	2	13	10	132	33*	18.85	0	5	5	57	21	11.40	0	2	0				
PN Kirsten	20	33	1563	228	57.88	3	15	15	425	63	30.35	0	5	5	229	84*	57.25	0	4	4	76	65	25.33	0
BJM Maher	2	3	6	4*	3.00	0	1	1	0	0	0.00	0												
G Miller	20	30	538	81	19.92	0	13	12	229	52*	22.90	0	4	4	81	57	27.00	0	4	3	97	74	48.50	0
DG Moir	3	4	26	16	8.66	0																		
PG Newman	14	15	93	27	8.45	0	11	3	10	7	3.33	0	3	2	15	8	15.00	0	3	1	5	5*		0
S Oldham	15	14	92	33	10.22	0	14	4	25	14	12.50	0	3	1	1	1	1.00	0	2	0				
DS Steele	20	30	836	137	29.85	1	13	8	145	35	20.71	0	5	5	113	89*	28.25	0	4	3	32	12	10.66	0
RW Taylor	15	15	231	100	19.25	1	12	4	39	26*	19.50	0	5	3	33	12*	33.00	0	4	2	30	16	30.00	0
CJ Tunnicliffe	20	24	239	39	10.39	0	14	12	91	27	13.00	0	5	4	18	15*	6.00	0	4	2	21	11	10.50	0
B Wood	21	35	1412	153	48.68	3	15	14	285	58*	25.90	0	5	5	48	18	9.60	0	4	4	76	32*	25.33	0
JG Wright	19	30	1110	150	38.27	3	15	15	618	87*	51.50	0	5	5	216	76	43.20	0	4	4	104	47	34.66	0

=== Competition bowling averages ===
Name	County Championship					John Player League					NWB Trophy					B & H Cup				
Name	Balls	Runs	Wkts	Best	Ave	Balls	Runs	Wkts	Best	Ave	Balls	Runs	Wkts	Best	Ave	Balls	Runs	Wkts	Best	Ave
S Anderson	330	222	3	1-17	74.00															
KJ Barnett	705	435	4	2-58	108.75						24	19	1	1-19	19.00					
M Hendrick	1952	792	30	5-41	26.40	474	267	13	3-43	20.53	264	109	3	2-20	36.33	189	82	8	4-18	10.25
A Hill	7	5	0																	
PN Kirsten	156	82	1	1-7	82.00	78	54	3	2-15	18.00	12	8	0			36	18	0		
G Miller	2738	1258	33	4-27	38.12	324	195	12	4-35	16.25	204	123	7	2-16	17.57	76	38	1	1-20	38.00
DG Moir	374	203	2	1-20	101.50															
PG Newman	1965	1115	46	5-51	24.23	516	336	12	3-24	28.00	184	86	7	3-23	12.28	96	44	2	1-14	22.00
S Oldham	1886	1025	23	3-35	44.56	590	514	18	3-24	28.55	138	77	4	3-29	19.25	132	69	1	1-33	69.00
DS Steele	2364	1015	46	7-53	22.06	136	113	5	3-36	22.60	177	112	4	2-23	28.00	96	77	4	2-7	19.25
CJ Tunnicliffe	2918	1536	42	5-34	36.57	607	379	20	5-24	18.95	300	147	11	5-50	13.36	198	89	8	5-24	11.12
B Wood	1419	774	16	2-12	48.37	684	453	21	3-19	21.57	360	127	6	2-14	21.16	132	45	2	2-24	22.50

=== Wicket Keeping ===
- Bob Taylor

County Championship Catches 33, Stumping 12
John Player League Catches 12, Stumping 5
NWB Trophy Catches 10, Stumping 2
B & H Trophy Catches 1, Stumping 1

- Bernie Maher

County Championship Catches 6, Stumping 2

== See also ==
- Derbyshire County Cricket Club seasons
- 1981 English cricket season
