= 1979 Cricket World Cup knockout stage =

Semi-finals
20 June - (England) Old Trafford, Manchester
England | 221/8
New Zealand | 212/9
20 June - (England) The Oval, London
West Indies | 293/6
Pakistan | 250

Final
23 June - (England) Lord's, London
England | 194
West Indies | 286/9

== Semifinals ==
=== England vs New Zealand ===
June 20, 1979
Scorecard

| England; 221/8 (60 overs) | v | New Zealand; 212/9 (60 overs) |
| Graham Gooch 71 (84); Brian McKechnie 2/46 (12 overs) | | John Wright 69 (137); Mike Hendrick 3/55 (12 overs) |

England won by 9 runs
Old Trafford, Manchester, England
Umpires: John Langridge and Ken Palmer
Player of the match: Graham Gooch

- England qualified for the final for the first time.

In a very close semifinal match, England prevailed. New Zealand won the toss and fielded. England began badly, falling to 38/2, before Mike Brearley (53 from 115 balls, 3 fours) and Graham Gooch (71 from 84 balls, 1 four, 3 sixes) resurrected the innings. Derek Randall (42 from 50 balls, 1 four, 1 six) played well in the second half of the innings, as England recovered from 98/4 to post 221 (8 wickets, 60 overs). In the response, John Wright (69 from 137 balls) attacked well in the beginning. However, the loss of wickets bogged New Zealand down, and despite several late flourishes in the batting order, New Zealand started to drop behind. When New Zealand could not achieve the remaining 14 runs from the last over of the match, England went into the final.

=== West Indies vs Pakistan ===
June 20, 1979
Scorecard

| West Indies; 293/6 (60 overs) | v | Pakistan; 250 all out (56.2 overs) |
| Gordon Greenidge 73 (107); Asif Iqbal 4/56 (11 overs) | | Zaheer Abbas 93 (122); Colin Croft 3/29 (11 overs) |

West Indies won by 43 runs
The Oval, London, England
Umpires: Lloyd Budd and David Constant
Player of the match: Gordon Greenidge

- West Indies qualified for the final for second time after 1975.

Gordon Greenidge (73 from 107 balls, 5 fours, 1 six) and Desmond Haynes (65 from 115 balls, 4 fours) set a first wicket partnership of 132 runs in a match dominated by batting. Vivian Richards and Clive Lloyd also contributed solidly, as West Indies ran up 293 (6 wickets, 60 overs) against Pakistan. Majid Khan (81 from 124 balls, 7 fours) and Zaheer Abbas (93 from 122 balls) shared a second-wicket partnership of 166 runs in 36 overs in the response. However, none of the other Pakistani batsmen flourished, with Javed Miandad being bowled for a duck first ball, and Pakistan lost 9/74, beginning with the dismissal of Abbas. Pakistan was bowled all out for 250 (all out, 56.2 overs) in the high-scoring semifinal, sending the West Indies to the final.

== Final ==
June 23, 1979
Scorecard

| West Indies; 286/9 (60 overs) | v | England; 194 all out (51 overs) |
| Viv Richards 138* (157); Phil Edmonds 2/40 (12 overs) | | Mike Brearley 64 (130); Joel Garner 5/38 (11 overs) |

West Indies won by 92 runs
Lord's, London, England
Umpires: Dickie Bird and Barrie Meyer
Player of the match: Viv Richards

England won the toss and chose to field first. The West Indies got off to a bad start, falling to 99/4 with the loss of Greenidge, Haynes, Kallicharan, and captain Clive Lloyd. However, Vivian Richards (138 from 157 balls, 11 fours, 3 sixes) and Collis King (86 from 66 balls, 10 fours, 3 sixes) consolidated the innings. King especially ripped through the English bowling, with a strike rate of 130.3. The West Indies were already at 5/238 when the 139 run partnership ended with the loss of Collis King. Vivian Richards and the tail then took the West Indies to a very imposing total of 286 (9 wickets, 60 overs).

The English batsmen got off to a good start. But the openers, Mike Brearley (64 from 130 balls, 7 fours) and Geoff Boycott (57 from 105 balls, 3 fours) scored very slowly. They put together a very methodical opening partnership of 129 runs in 38 overs, playing as if the match were a five-day Test. By the time both batsmen were out, the run rate had risen too high. Graham Gooch played some hefty strokes in scoring his 32, taking England to 183/2. However, the loss of Derek Randall triggered the most devastating collapse in World Cup history, as England lost 8/11. They were eventually all out for 194 in 51 overs. Vivian Richards was declared Man of the Match.
