= 1979 Cricket World Cup =

1979 World Cup in England

Prudential Cup '79
- Dates: 9 – 23 June 1979
- Administrator: International Cricket Conference
- Cricket format: One Day International
- Tournament format(s): Round-robin and Knockout
- Host: England
- Champions: West Indies (2nd title)
- Runners-up: England
- Participants: 8
- Matches: 15
- Attendance: 132,000 (8,800 per match)
- Most runs: (Cricket West Indies) Gordon Greenidge (253)
- Most wickets: (England) Mike Hendrick (10)

The 1979 Cricket World Cup (officially called the Prudential Cup '79) was the second edition of the Cricket World Cup. Organised by the International Cricket Conference, it was held in England from 9 to 23 June 1979.

The tournament was once again sponsored by the Prudential Assurance Company and had eight teams participating in the tournament with the only change being Canada who qualified with Sri Lanka in the qualifier for the tournament. The format remained the same with two teams qualifying from each group with the final once again being at Lord's.

England joined first-time semi-finalists Pakistan as the qualifiers from Group A, while the West Indies finished top of Group B ahead of New Zealand. After the West Indies and England both won their semi-finals over Pakistan and New Zealand, respectively, they met in the final at Lord's with the West Indies defending their title from four years earlier with a 92-run victory. West Indian batsman, Gordon Greenidge ended the tournament as the leading run scorer with 253 runs from four matches with English player Mike Hendrick ending up as the leading wicket-taker with ten wickets.

== Format ==
The eight teams at the tournament were split into two groups of four teams, with each team playing the others in their group in a single round-robin format. The top two teams from each group then advance to the semi-finals to play in a single-elimination tournament.

== Participants ==
Highlighted are the countries to participate in the 1979 Cricket World Cup. Qualified as full member of ICC Qualified via 1979 ICC Trophy Failed to qualify

The 1979 tournament saw the first qualifiers in a World Cup. The 1979 ICC Trophy was held during late May and early June at various grounds in the English Midlands, with the two finalists qualifying for the World Cup where they joined the six Test nations who qualified automatically. Sri Lanka and Canada qualified after defeating Denmark and Bermuda respectively in the semi-finals.

Team	Method of qualification	Finals appearances	Last appearance	Previous best performance	Group
England	Hosts	2nd	1975	Semi-finals (1975)	A
India	Full member	2nd	1975	Group stage (1975)	B
Australia	Full member	2nd	1975	Runners-up (1975)	A
Pakistan	Full member	2nd	1975	Group stage (1975)	A
West Indies	Full member	2nd	1975	Champions (1975)	B
New Zealand	Full member	2nd	1975	Semi-finals (1975)	B
Sri Lanka	1979 ICC Trophy winner	2nd	1975	Group stage (1975)	B
Canada	1979 ICC Trophy runner-up	1st	—	Debut	A

== Venues ==
London	1979 Cricket World Cup is located in England	London
Lord's Cricket Ground	1979 Cricket World Cup is located in England	The Oval
Capacity: 30,000	1979 Cricket World Cup is located in England	Capacity: 23,500
Birmingham	1979 Cricket World Cup is located in England	Manchester
Edgbaston Cricket Ground	1979 Cricket World Cup is located in England	Old Trafford Cricket Ground
Capacity: 21,000	1979 Cricket World Cup is located in England	Capacity: 19,000
Nottingham	1979 Cricket World Cup is located in England	Leeds
Trent Bridge	1979 Cricket World Cup is located in England	Headingley Cricket Ground
Capacity: 15,350	1979 Cricket World Cup is located in England	Capacity: 14,000

== Group stage ==
=== Summary ===
The opening round of matches took place on 9 June with four matches being played. England took on Australia at Lord's and after the home team elected to field first, restricted the Australians to 97 for one with fine fielding and bowling. After Andrew Hilditch dragged his second ball after lunch into the stumps, the Australians would be restricted for 159 which included four run-outs. The run-chase saw Mike Brearley and Graham Gooch control the innings and led England to a six wicket victory.

=== Group A ===
Pos	Team	Pld	W	L	T	NR	Pts	RR
1	England	3	3	0	0	0	12	3.066
2	Pakistan	3	2	1	0	0	8	3.602
3	Australia	3	1	2	0	0	4	3.164
4	Canada	3	0	3	0	0	0	1.606

Source: ESPNcricinfo

9 June 1979
Scorecard

Australia; 159/9 (60 overs)	v	England; 160/4 (47.1 overs)

England won by 6 wickets
Lord's, London, England

9 June 1979
Scorecard

Canada; 139/9 (60 overs)	v	Pakistan; 140/2 (40.1 overs)

Pakistan won by 8 wickets
Headingley, Leeds, England

13–14 June 1979
Scorecard

Pakistan; 286/7 (60 overs)	v	Australia; 197 (57.1 overs)

Pakistan won by 89 runs
Trent Bridge, Nottingham, England

13–14 June 1979
Scorecard

Canada; 45 (40.3 overs)	v	England; 46/2 (13.5 overs)

England won by 8 wickets
Old Trafford, Manchester, England

16 June 1979
Scorecard

Canada; 105 (33.2 overs)	v	Australia; 106/3 (26 overs)

Australia won by 7 wickets
Edgbaston, Birmingham, England

16 June 1979
Scorecard

England; 165/9 (60 overs)	v	Pakistan; 151 (56 overs)

England won by 14 runs
Headingley, Leeds, England

=== Group B ===
Pos	Team	Pld	W	L	T	NR	Pts	RR
1	West Indies	3	2	0	0	1	10	3.928
2	New Zealand	3	2	1	0	0	8	3.553
3	Sri Lanka	3	1	1	0	1	6	3.558
4	India	3	0	3	0	0	0	3.128

Source: ESPNcricinfo

9 June 1979
Scorecard

India; 190 (53.1 overs)	v	West Indies; 194/1 (51.3 overs)

West Indies won by 9 wickets
Edgbaston, Birmingham, England

9 June 1979
Scorecard

Sri Lanka; 189 (56.5 overs)	v	New Zealand; 190/1 (47.4 overs)

New Zealand won by 9 wickets
Trent Bridge, Nottingham, England

13–15 June 1979
Scorecard

Sri Lanka	v	West Indies

Match abandoned without a ball bowled
The Oval, London, England

13 June 1979
Scorecard

India; 182 (55.5 overs)	v	New Zealand; 183/2 (57 overs)

New Zealand won by 8 wickets
Headingley, Leeds, England

16–18 June 1979
Scorecard

Sri Lanka; 238/5 (60 overs)	v	India; 191 (54.1 overs)

Sri Lanka won by 47 runs
Old Trafford, Manchester, England

16 June 1979
Scorecard

West Indies; 244/7 (60 overs)	v	New Zealand; 212/9 (60 overs)

West Indies won by 32 runs
Trent Bridge, Nottingham, England

== Knockout stage ==
Semi-finals
20 June – Old Trafford, Manchester
England	221/8
New Zealand	212/9
20 June – The Oval, London
West Indies	293/6
Pakistan	250

Final
23 June – Lord's, London
England	194
West Indies	286/9

=== Semi-finals ===
In a very close semi-final match, England prevailed. New Zealand won the toss and fielded. England began badly, falling to 38/2, before Mike Brearley (53 from 115 balls, 3 fours) and Graham Gooch (71 from 84 balls, 1 four, 3 sixes) resurrected the innings. Derek Randall (42 from 50 balls, 1 four, 1 six) played well in the second half of the innings, as England recovered from 98/4 to post 221 (8 wickets, 60 overs). In the response, John Wright (69 from 137 balls) attacked well in the beginning. However, the loss of wickets bogged New Zealand down, and despite several late flourishes in the batting order, New Zealand started to drop behind. When New Zealand could not achieve the remaining 14 runs from the last over of the match, England went into the final.

Gordon Greenidge (73 from 107 balls, 5 fours, 1 six) and Desmond Haynes (65 from 115 balls, 4 fours) set a first wicket partnership of 132 runs in a match dominated by batting. Vivian Richards and Clive Lloyd also contributed solidly, as West Indies ran up 293 (6 wickets, 60 overs) against Pakistan. Majid Khan (81 from 124 balls, 7 fours) and Zaheer Abbas (93 from 122 balls) shared a second-wicket partnership of 166 runs in 36 overs in the response. However, none of the other Pakistani batsmen flourished, with Javed Miandad being bowled for a duck first ball, and Pakistan lost 9/74, beginning with the dismissal of Abbas. Pakistan was bowled out for 250 in 56.2 overs in the high-scoring semi-final, sending the West Indies to the final.

20 June 1979
Scorecard

West Indies; 293/6 (60 overs)	v	Pakistan; 250 (56.2 overs)

West Indies won by 43 runs
The Oval, London, England

20 June 1979
Scorecard

England; 221/8 (60 overs)	v	New Zealand; 212/9 (60 overs)

England won by 9 runs
Old Trafford, Manchester, England

=== Final ===
England won the toss and chose to field first. The West Indies got off to a bad start, falling to 99/4 with the loss of Greenidge, Haynes, Kallicharan, and captain Clive Lloyd. However, Vivian Richards (138 from 157 balls, 11 fours, 3 sixes) and Collis King (86 from 66 balls, 10 fours, 3 sixes) consolidated the innings. King especially savaged the English bowling, with a strike rate of 130.3. The West Indies were 238/5 when the 139 run partnership ended with King's dismissal. Vivian Richards and the tail then took the West Indies to a very imposing total of 286 (9 wickets, 60 overs).

The English batsmen got off to a good start. But the openers, Mike Brearley (64 from 130 balls, 7 fours) and Geoff Boycott (57 from 105 balls, 3 fours) scored very slowly with a methodical opening partnership of 129 runs in 38 overs, playing as if the match were a five-day Test. By the time both batsmen were out, the required run rate had risen too high, putting pressure on the later batsmen. Graham Gooch played some hefty strokes in scoring his 32, taking England to 183/2. However, the loss of Derek Randall triggered a batting collapse in which England lost their last eight wickets for 11 runs to finish all out for 194 in 51 overs. Vivian Richards was declared Man of the Match.

23 June 1979
Scorecard

West Indies; 286/9 (60 overs)	v	England; 194 (51 overs)

West Indies won by 92 runs
Lord's, London, England

== Statistics ==
Gordon Greenidge ended the tournament as the leading run scorer with 253 runs coming from his four games. Second was fellow West Indian player, Viv Richards who finished with 217 runs from four games which included the highest individual score of the tournament of 138 in the final. Graham Gooch from England rounded out the top three. Mike Hendrick from England was the leading wicket taker for the tournament with ten wickets from five matches with a three-way tie for second place with Brian McKechnie (New Zealand), Asif Iqbal (Pakistan) and Chris Old each taking nine wickets for the tournament.

=== Most runs ===
Player	Team	Innings	Runs	High score
Gordon Greenidge	West Indies	4	253	106 not out
Viv Richards	West Indies	4	217	138 not out
Graham Gooch	England	5	210	71
Glenn Turner	New Zealand	4	176	83 not out
John Wright	New Zealand	4	166	69

- Source: CricInfo

=== Most wickets ===
Player	Team	Matches	Wickets	Best bowling
Mike Hendrick	England	5	10	4/15
Brian McKechnie	New Zealand	4	9	3/24
Asif Iqbal	Pakistan	4	9	4/56
Chris Old	England	5	9	4/8
Michael Holding	West Indies	4	8	4/33

- Source: CricInfo

== Attendance ==
The total attendance at the tournament was 132,000, including 25,000 at the final.
