= John Lister (cricketer) =

English cricketer

John Wilton Lister (born 1 April 1959) is a former English cricketer who played for Derbyshire between 1978 and 1979 and for Durham between 1983 and 1988.

Lister was born in Darlington, and made his first-class debut for Derbyshire in the 1978 season, when he opened in a victory against Nottinghamshire. He played in two further first-class matches in the season which were draws.

Lister played two more first-class matches, in the 1979 season, before he was demoted to the Second XI, where he played for two more years. Lister was a right-handed opening batsman for the Derbyshire team.

After four years, Lister returned in 1983 to play Minor Counties cricket for his home county of Durham, who were victorious in the English Estates Trophy of 1985, and he represented them until 1988.
