= Pakistani cricket team in England in 1978 =

International cricket tour

The Pakistan cricket team toured England in the 1978 season to play a three-match Test series against England. England won the series 2–0 with 1 match drawn.

== Test series summary ==
=== First Test ===
1–5 June 1978
Scorecard

Pakistan	v	England
164 (60.4 overs); Mohsin Khan 35 (100); CM Old 7/50 (22.4 overs)		452/8d (144 overs); CT Radley 106 (234); Sikander Bakht 4/132 (45 overs)
231 (103.4 overs); Sadiq Mohammad 79 (123); PH Edmonds 4/44 (26 overs)

England won by an innings and 57 runs
Edgbaston, Birmingham
Umpires: HD Bird and KE Palmer
Player of the match: CM Old (ENG)

- Pakistan won the toss and elected to bat.
- 4 June was taken as a rest day.
- The match was scheduled for five days but completed in four.
- DI Gower (ENG) made his Test debut.

=== Second Test ===
15–19 June 1978
Scorecard

England	v	Pakistan
364 (91.2 overs); IT Botham 108 (110); Liaqat Ali 3/80 (18 overs)		105 (36 overs); Mohsin Khan 31 (91); RGD Willis 5/47 (13 overs)
		139 (f/o) (66.5 overs); Mohsin Khan 46 (117); IT Botham 8/34 (20.5 overs)

England won by an innings and 120 runs
Lord's, London
Umpires: WL Budd and DJ Constant
Player of the match: IT Botham (ENG)

- England won the toss and elected to bat.
- 18 June was taken as a rest day.
- There was no play on the first day.
- The match was scheduled for five days but completed in four.

=== Third Test ===
29 June–4 July 1978
Scorecard

Pakistan	v	England
205 (105.4 overs); Sadiq Mohammad 97 (282); CM Old 4/41 (41.4 overs)		119/7(54 overs); DI Gower 39 (99); Sarfraz Nawaz 5/39 (20 overs)

Match drawn
Headingley, Leeds
Umpires: HD Bird and KE Palmer
Player of the match: Sadiq Mohammad (PAK)

- Pakistan won the toss and elected to bat.
- 2 July was taken as a rest day.
- There was no play on the third day.

== One Day Internationals (ODIs) ==
England won the Prudential Trophy 2-0.

=== 1st ODI ===
24, 25 May 1978
Scorecard

England; 217/7 (55 overs)	v	Pakistan; 85 (47 overs)
CT Radley 79 (129); Sikander Bakht 3/56 (11 overs)		Wasim Bari 19 (49); RGD Willis 4/15 (11 overs)

England won by 132 runs
Old Trafford, Manchester
Umpires: DJ Constant and KE Palmer
Player of the match: RGD Willis (ENG)

- England won the toss and elected to bat.
- Reserve day used. Pakistan were 12/2 (11 overs) at the end of the first day.
- DI Gower and CT Radley (both ENG) made their ODI debuts.

=== 2nd ODI ===
26 May 1978
Scorecard

England; 248/6 (55 overs)	v	Pakistan; 154/8 (55 overs)
DI Gower 114* (122); Mudassar Nazar 2/31 (6 overs)		Mudassar Nazar 56 (136); B Wood 2/14 (4 overs)

England won by 94 runs
The Oval, London
Umpires: HD Bird and WL Budd
Player of the match: DI Gower (ENG)

- Pakistan won the toss and elected to field.
- Naeem Ahmed (PAK) made his ODI debut.

== External sources ==
- CricketArchive – tour itineraries

== Annual reviews ==
- Playfair Cricket Annual 1979
- Wisden Cricketers' Almanack 1979
