= David Wilde (cricketer) =

English cricketer (1950–2026)

David Wilde (3 July 1950 – 4 March 2026) was an English cricketer who played first-class cricket for Derbyshire in 1971 and 1972.

== Biography ==
Wilde was born in Glossop on 3 July 1950. He started playing for Derbyshire in 1969 for the junior sides and for the second XI and became a regular bowler for the second eleven in 1970. In the 1971 season, Wilde made his first-class debut against Somerset in May when he took three wickets. He played three more first-class games in the season but most of his games were for the second XI.

In the 1972 season, Wilde played proportionately more games for the first team and recorded his best bowling figures of 3–27 against Essex.

Wilde played limited-overs cricket with one match in 1969 and 1970 and extensive appearances throughout 1972 but left the professional game in the same year.

He was a left-arm medium-fast bowler and took 23 first-class wickets at an average of 37.39 and a best performance of 3 for 27. He took ten wickets in one-day cricket with an average of 31.10 and a best performance of 3 for 31. He was a left-handed batsman and played 15 innings in 13 first-class matches at an average of 3.10 and a top score of 12. He played 3 innings in ten one-day matches and made one run.

On 4 March 2026, it was announced that Wilde had died at the age of 75.
