= John Walters (cricketer) =

English cricketer

John Walters (born 7 August 1949) is a former English cricketer who played for Derbyshire between 1977 and 1980.

Walters first played for Derbyshire in the 1977 season which saw the team finish seventh in the County Championship and continued in the 1978 season. He was part of the Derbyshire team which reached the Benson & Hedges Cup semi-finals of 1979 and continued to play for the Derbyshire team in limited overs cricket until 1980.

Walters was a left-handed batsman and a right-arm medium-fast bowler. Though he debuted as a tailend batsman, the presence of Philip Russell as a tailender and a forceful bowler changed Walters' role to that of a lower-order player.

== Personal life ==
Walters' father was footballer Henry Walters.
