= Keith Stevenson =

English cricketer

Personal information
- Full name: Keith Stevenson
- Born: 5 October 1950 (age 76); Derby, Derbyshire, England
- Batting: Right-handed
- Bowling: Right-arm fast-medium

Domestic team information
- Years: Team
- 1974–1977: Derbyshire
- 1978–1983: Hampshire

Career statistics
Competition	First-class	List A
Matches	146	106
Runs scored	1,046	138
Batting average	9.59	5.75
100s/50s	–/–	–/–
Top score	33	14
Balls bowled	19,409	4,630
Wickets	355	117
Bowling average	29.67	27.41
5 wickets in innings	16	–
10 wickets in match	–	–
Best bowling	7/22	4/18
Catches/stumpings	48/–	12/–
- Source: Cricinfo, 28 June 2023

Keith Stevenson (born 6 October 1950) is a former English first-class cricketer who played for Derbyshire from 1974 to 1977 and for Hampshire from 1978 to 1984.

== Early life and career with Derbyshire ==
Stevenson was born in Derby. His involvement in cricket began when he was scorer for his father's team before he began playing alongside him at his cricket club. In 1968 he was playing for Derbyshire Old Juniors and made the Second XI in 1969. He played for the Derbyshire under 25s in 1972, while appearing for the Second XI. He was meanwhile employed by Rolls-Royce Limited in Derby.

Stevenson played for Derbyshire in the Benson & Hedges Cup and John Player League in May 1974 and made his first-class debut in a match against the Indians in June 1974 in which he scored 25 not out and took 2 for 47. In May 1975 he played in a notable match against Lancashire at Buxton. It started in sweltering heat and Lancashire were able to run up 477 for 5 and take three wickets for 29 runs before the close of play. The next day Derbyshire defeated Glamorgan in the John Player League on the same ground. However on the Monday the ground was covered by 3 inches of snow and play was impossible. The Derbyshire team feared the worst on the Tuesday, for at that time bowlers' run-ups were protected but the wickets themselves were not and they were dismissed for 42 and 87. Stevenson took his first 5 wicket innings later that season with 5-65 against Essex. In 1976 he took 5-47 against both Somerset and Lancashire and in 1977 took 7-68 against Warwickshire in 1977.

== Move to Hampshire ==
In 1978 after considered transferring in the previous season, Stevenson moved to Hampshire who offered him a longer-term contract than his native Derbyshire. Hampshire won the John Player League that summer defeating a Middlesex side containing nine current and future Test players at Bournemouth to take the title by 26 runs. In 1978 he took 6-73 against Sussex and 5-72 against Surrey. He achieved his best bowling performance of 7-22 against Oxford University in 1979 after 5-30 against Glamorgan and before 5-106 against Lancashire and 5-40 against Kent. In 1980 he took 5-66 against Worcestershire and 5-86 against Lancashire. He took 5-32 against Nottinghamshire, 5-94 against Glamorgan and 5-49 against his former team Derbyshire in 1981. In 1983 he achieved his last 5 wicket innings with 5-81 against Sussex.

Stevenson was a right-arm fast-medium bowler who took 355 first-class wickets and 117 wickets in One Day competitions. For Derbyshire he took 98 first-class wickets with an average of 30.58 and a best performance of 7 for 68. For Hampshire he took 257 first-class wickets at an average of 29.33 and a best performance of 7 for 22. He was a right-hand batsman and played 167 innings in 146 first-class matches at an average of 9.59 and a top score of 33. He claimed to have made a century once, but in fact this was while acting as a runner for Brian Bolus.

Stevenson left Hampshire in 1984 and followed a career in an estate agency. In 1998 he returned to Derbyshire County Cricket Club when he was appointed Commercial Manager for the club, while remaining in the estate agents business for another ten years. He was also active on behalf of Duffield Cricket Club. Keith retired from the estate agency business in November 2015
