= 1979 Cricket World Cup Group B =

Pos	Team	Pld	W	L	T	NR	Pts	RR
1	West Indies	3	2	0	0	1	10	3.928
2	New Zealand	3	2	1	0	0	8	3.553
3	Sri Lanka	3	1	1	0	1	6	3.558
4	India	3	0	3	0	0	0	3.128

Source: ESPNcricinfo

== India vs West Indies ==
9 June 1979
Scorecard

India; 190 (53.1 overs)	v	West Indies; 194/1 (51.3 overs)
Gundappa Viswanath 75 (134); Michael Holding 4/33 (12 overs)		Gordon Greenidge 106 (173); Kapil Dev 1/46 (10 overs)

West Indies won by 9 wickets
Edgbaston, Birmingham, England
Umpires: David Evans (Eng) and John Langridge (Eng)
Player of the match: Gordon Greenidge (WI)

== Sri Lanka vs New Zealand ==
9 June 1979
Scorecard

Sri Lanka; 189 (56.5 overs)	v	New Zealand; 190/1 (47.4 overs)
Anura Tennekoon 59 (96); Brian McKechnie 3/25 (10.5 overs)		Glenn Turner 83 (143); Ajit de Silva 1/39 (12 overs)

New Zealand won by 9 wickets
Trent Bridge, Nottingham, England
Umpires: Lloyd Budd (Eng) and Ken Palmer (Eng)
Player of the match: Geoff Howarth (NZ)

== Sri Lanka vs West Indies ==
13 June 1979
Scorecard

Sri Lanka	v	West Indies

Match abandoned without a ball bowled
The Oval, London, England
Umpires: unknown
Player of the match: no award

- No toss
- 2 reserve days used, no play due to heavy rain.

== India vs New Zealand ==
13 June 1979
Scorecard

India; 182 (55.5 overs)	v	New Zealand; 183/2 (57 overs)
Sunil Gavaskar 55 (144); Brian McKechnie 3/24 (12 overs)		Bruce Edgar 84* (167); Mohinder Amarnath 1/39 (12 overs)

New Zealand won by 8 wickets
Headingley, Leeds, England
Umpires: Lloyd Budd (Eng) and Alan Whitehead (Eng)
Player of the match: Bruce Edgar (NZ)

== Sri Lanka vs India ==
16, 18 June 1979
Scorecard

Sri Lanka; 238/5 (60 overs)	v	India; 191 (54.1 overs)
Sunil Wettimuny 67 (120); Mohinder Amarnath 3/40 (12 overs)		Dilip Vengsarkar 36 (57); Somachandra de Silva 3/29 (11 overs)

Sri Lanka won by 47 runs
Old Trafford, Manchester, England
Umpires: Ken Palmer (Eng) and Alan Whitehead (Eng)
Player of the match: Duleep Mendis (SL)

- Reserve day used

== West Indies vs New Zealand ==
16 June 1979
Scorecard

West Indies; 244/7 (60 overs)	v	New Zealand; 212/9 (60 overs)
Clive Lloyd 73* (80); Jeremy Coney 2/40 (12 overs)		Richard Hadlee 42 (48); Andy Roberts 3/43 (12 overs)

West Indies won by 32 runs
Trent Bridge, Nottingham, England
Umpires: Dickie Bird (Eng) and Barrie Meyer (Eng)
Player of the match: Clive Lloyd (WI)
