= Michael Deakin =

English cricketer

Michael Deakin (born 6 May 1958) is a former English cricketer who played for Derbyshire in 1981.

Deakin was born at Bury, Greater Manchester. In 1979 he was playing cricket for Combined Services and for the RAF. He joined Derbyshire for the 1981 season as a stopgap solution to a Derbyshire wicket-keeper shortage, while Bob Taylor was engaged in Test matches. He played in the Second XI in May 1981, and in under 25 competitions in June. In July, he made four first-class appearances for the team and played in the John Player League. He was released by the club at the end of the season.

Deakin was a right-handed batsman and played six innings in four first-class matches with an average of 7.5 and a top score of 15. He did not bat in the one-day competition. As a wicket-keeper he took nine catches in the first-class game and two in the one-day competition.
