= Henry Walters (footballer) =

English footballer

Personal information
- Full name: Henry Walters
- Date of birth: 15 March 1925
- Place of birth: Wath upon Dearne, England
- Date of death: 26 June 1994 (aged 69)
- Place of death: Barnsley, England
- Height: 5 ft 9 in (1.75 m)
- Positions: Wing half; full back

Youth career
- –1942: Wath Wanderers

Senior career*
Years	Team	Apps	(Gls)
1942–1946	Wolverhampton Wanderers	0	(0)
1946–1953	Walsall	254	(2)
1953–1960	Barnsley	160	(4)
- Wombwell Sporting Association

Managerial career
- Wombwell Sporting Association (player-manager)
- * Club domestic league appearances and goals

Henry Walters (15 March 1925 – 26 June 1994) was an English professional footballer who made over 410 appearances in the Football League for Walsall and Barnsley as a wing half or full back.

== Personal life ==
During the Second World War, while still a teenager, Walters was sent to London to clean up bomb damage. While a part-time professional footballer with Barnsley, he worked as a joiner at Cortonwood Colliery. Walters' son John became a cricketer.

== Honours ==
Barnsley

- Football League Third Division North: 1954–55
