= Paul Kirsten =

South African cricketer (born 1969)

Cricket information
- Batting: Right-handed

Career statistics
Competition	First-class	List A
Matches	55	63
Runs scored	1,519	663
Batting average	21.09	25.50
100s/50s	0/7	0/1
Top score	91*	67
Catches/stumpings	170/12	76/6
- Source: Cricinfo, 14 December 2019

Paul Kirsten (born 30 October 1969) is a former South African first-class cricketer. He is the brother of Gary Kirsten and half brother of Peter Kirsten and Andrew Kirsten.
