= Michael Glenn (cricketer) =

English cricketer

Michael Glenn (born 14 June 1956) was an English cricketer. He was a right-handed batsman and a right-arm medium-fast bowler who played first-class cricket for Derbyshire.

A Belper native, the youngster, only eighteen at the time of his debut first-class appearance in 1975, had represented the team in the Second XI Championship since the previous season. He was only able to inspire the Derbyshire team to finish third-bottom of the County Championship table in 1975, however, with the hope of changing fortunes the following season, he was only to see play in two more first-class games, and having barely turned 20, found himself out of the first-team. Glenn also briefly played for the Second XI teams of Northamptonshire and Worcestershire.

Glenn was a lower order batsman who often found himself partnered with Test player Mike Hendrick during his short stint in the Second XI in the absence of Alan Ward.
