= Dallas Moir =

Maltese-born Scottish cricketer (born 1957)

Personal information
- Full name: Dallas Gordon Moir
- Born: 13 April 1957 (age 69); Imtarfa, Malta
- Height: 6 ft 8 in (2.03 m)
- Batting: Right-handed
- Bowling: Slow left-arm orthodox
- Relatives: Jeremy Moir (twin brother)

Domestic team information
- Years: Team
- 1980–1987: Scotland
- 1981–1985: Derbyshire

Career statistics
Competition	First-class	List A
Matches	73	38
Runs scored	1,172	347
Batting average	15.42	11.56
100s/50s	1/3	0/1
Top score	107	79
Balls bowled	14,591	1,757
Wickets	206	22
Bowling average	32.98	54.50
5 wickets in innings	9	0
10 wickets in match	1	0
Best bowling	6/60	3/54
Catches/stumpings	64/–	11/–
- Source: CricketArchive, 20 August 2014

Dallas Moir (born 13 April 1957) is a Maltese-born Scottish former cricketer who played first-class cricket for Scotland in 1980 and 1986 and for Derbyshire between 1981 and 1985.

Moir played for Scotland B in 1978 and in 1980 played several games for Scotland including a first-class match against Ireland and one-day events. Also in 1980 he made his Second XI debut for Warwickshire. He joined Derbyshire in the 1981 season playing mainly in the second XI, but played three first-class matches.

In the 1982 season, Moir played regularly for Derbyshire first team, where he stayed for three years. His sole century innings came against Warwickshire in July 1984. He finished playing for Derbyshire at the end of 1985 but represented Scotland again in 1986, his first-class match being in an innings victory against Ireland.

Moir was a right-handed batsman and played 87 innings in 73 first-class matches with an average of 15.42 and a top score of 107. He played 32 innings in 38 one-day matches. He was a slow left-arm bowler and took 206 first-class wickets with an average of 32.98 and a best performance of 6 for 60. He took a further 22 wickets in the one-day competitions.

Moir's twin brother, Jeremy, played first-class and List A cricket for Scotland in the NatWest Trophy and the Benson and Hedges Cup between 1989 and 1992.
