= Raymond Hanson (cricketer) =

English cricketer

Personal information
- Full name: Raymond Leslie Hanson
- Born: 12 April 1951 (age 75); Chesterfield, Derbyshire, England
- Batting: Right-handed
- Role: Wicket-keeper

Domestic team information
- Years: Team
- 1973: Derbyshire

Career statistics
Competition	First-class	List A
Matches	1	2
Runs scored	1	2
Batting average	–	2.00
100s/50s	–/–	–/–
Top score	1*	2
Catches/stumpings	1/–	5/–
- Source: Cricinfo, 24 January 2024

Raymond Leslie Hanson (born 12 April 1951) is a former English cricketer who played first-class and List A cricket for Derbyshire in 1973.

Hanson was born in Chesterfield. He joined Derbyshire in 1971 and played for the Second XI. He made his only first-class appearance for Derbyshire in the 1973 season against Sussex in August. He was stand-in wicket-keeper for Bob Taylor but saw little of the ball during the match. In the same season, Hanson played one List A match in the Benson and Hedges Cup and one in the John Player League .

Hanson was a wicket-keeper and right-handed who played at the tailend.
