= Kevin Brooks (cricketer) =

English cricketer (born 1959)

Personal information
- Full name: Kevin Graham Brooks
- Born: 15 October 1959 (age 67); Caversham, Berkshire, England
- Batting: Right-handed
- Bowling: Right-arm medium

Domestic team information
- Years: Team
- 1980–1981: Derbyshire
- 1983: Lincolnshire
- 1986–2003: Suffolk

Career statistics
Competition	First-class	List A
Matches	1	11
Runs scored	11	124
Batting average	5.50	15.50
100s/50s	–/–	–/1
Top score	8	51
Catches/stumpings	2/–	12/–
- Source: Cricinfo, 24 December 2021

Kevin Graham Brooks (born 15 October 1959) is an English cricketer who played first-class and one-day cricket for Derbyshire in 1980 and 1981.

Brooks was born at Caversham, Berkshire. He initially appeared in 1978 for Middlesex's Second XI, in a defeat by Glamorgan, before moving to Hampshire, where he played as a middle-order batsman until the end of the season. It was then he moved to Derbyshire, where he played in the Benson & Hedges Cup competition of 1980, before playing a single first-class match in the County Championship season against Warwickshire. In the 1981 season Brooks played one match in each of the John Player League and the Benson & Hedges Cup. He played mainly for Derbyshire Second XI in that season, and stayed with second the team until 1984. However he also played in the Second XI and Nat West Trophy side for Lincolnshire in 1983 and for Suffolk in the second XI and Nat West Trophy side in 1986 and 1987. Between 1987 and 2003 Brooks represented Suffolk in the Minor Counties Trophy and continued playing various matches until 2007.

Brooks was a right-handed batsman and played 2 innings in one first-class match in which he made eight and five. He played 10 innings in 11 one-day matches with an average of 15.5 and a top score of 51. He was a right-arm medium-pace bowler in the one day game but did not take a wicket.
