= Alan Mellor =

English cricketer

Personal information
- Full name: Alan John Mellor
- Born: 4 July 1959 (age 67); Horninglow, Staffordshire, England
- Batting: Right-handed
- Bowling: Slow left-arm orthodox

Domestic team information
- Years: Team
- 1978–1980: Derbyshire
- 1981–1986: Staffordshire

Career statistics
Competition	First-class	List A
Matches	13	4
Runs scored	26	0
Batting average	2.88	0.00
100s/50s	–/–	–/–
Top score	10*	0
Balls bowled	1,256	96
Wickets	17	1
Bowling average	38.41	95.00
5 wickets in innings	1	–
10 wickets in match	–	–
Best bowling	5/52	1/37
Catches/stumpings	4/–	–/–
- Source: Cricinfo, 1 July 2022

Alan John Mellor (born 4 July 1959) is a former English cricketer who played first-class cricket for Derbyshire between 1978 and 1979.

Mellor was born in Horninglow, Staffordshire. He made his first-class debut for Derbyshire in the 1978 season against Kent when he took five wickets for 52. He took 9 wickets in the season. He continued until the end of the 1979 season

Mellor was a left-arm slow bowler and a right-handed batsman. Mellor played three Youth Test matches and one Youth ODI, during the summer of 1978 against the West Indies.

More than five years later, Mellor resurfaced to play for his home county of Staffordshire in the Minor Counties Trophy.
