= Stephen Oldham =

English cricketer (born 1948)

Steve Oldham
Personal information
- Full name: Stephen Oldham
- Born: 26 July 1948 (age 78); High Green, Sheffield, Yorkshire, England
- Batting: Right-handed
- Bowling: Right-arm fast-medium

Domestic team information
- Years: Team
- 1974–1979, 1984–1985: Yorkshire
- 1980–1983: Derbyshire

Career statistics
Competition	First-class	List A
Matches	129	177
Runs scored	648	274
Batting average	11.36	8.30
100s/50s	0/1	0/0
Top score	50	38*
Balls bowled	18,150	8,442
Wickets	273	240
Bowling average	32.67	23.18
5 wickets in innings	4	2
10 wickets in match	0	n/a
Best bowling	7/78	5/32
Catches/stumpings	38/–	27/–
- Source: Cricinfo, 25 April 2026

Stephen Oldham (born 26 July 1948) is an English former first-class cricketer, who played for Yorkshire from 1974 to 1979 and from 1984 to 1985, and for Derbyshire in the intervening years 1980 to 1983.

Oldham made his debut for Yorkshire in the 1974 County Championship, taking 3 wickets for 7 runs in an innings victory for the team. He appeared exclusively in the Second XI during 1975, and rejuvenated his first-team career the following year. Oldham stayed with the Yorkshire first-team until 1979, and moved the following season to Derbyshire.

In the 1981 season, Oldham was a member of the Derbyshire team that won the National Westminster Bank Trophy. In 1982, he achieved his best first-class bowling performance of 7 for 78 against Warwickshire.

In 1984, Oldham moved back to Yorkshire, where, after a season of more consistent batting and fielding from other squad members, he was to find himself out of the first team. He played two more first-class matches, and rounded off his game with Benson & Hedges Cup action in 1989. In 1993, the 45-year-old Oldham played in two games for Yorkshire's Second XI, before ending his involvement with the game.

Oldham was a right-arm medium-fast bowler and took 273 first-class wickets at an average of 32.67, and a best performance of 7 for 78. He also took 240 wickets in one day competitions, with a best performance of 5 for 32. He was a right-handed batsman, and played 98 innings in 129 first-class matches at an average of 11.26, and with a top score of 50. He played 63 innings in 177 one day matches.
