= Chris Wilkins =

South African cricketer

Christopher Peter Wilkins (31 July 1944 – 1 October 2018) was a South African cricketer who played for Border from 1962/63 to 1970/71, for Derbyshire, from 1970 to 1972, for Eastern Province from 1972/73 to 1977/78 and for Natal from 1978/79 to 1982/83.

== Biography ==
Wilkins was born at King William's Town, Eastern Cape, South Africa. His cricketing career started with Border in 1962, when he represented them for the first time in the season's Currie Cup tournament. He was the South African Cricket Annual Cricketer of the Year in 1966. He continued playing for Border through to the 1969/70 season, and represented them for the last time when visited by the travelling Australians in February 1970.

In 1970, Wilkins moved to England, making his debut for Derbyshire in May against Yorkshire. Wilkins spent October to February in his homeland before moving back to England to play for Derbyshire again in the 1971 season, though he stayed in England over the winter and was a first-team choice once again in the 1972 season.

At the end of the 1972 season, Wilkins moved back to South Africa, but this time played for Eastern Province, having agreed a deal with Border to play for them. Eastern Province over the next few years had slightly better fortunes in their half of the Currie Cup draw than Border in theirs. He did not appear for an English county side again. Wilkins continued to play in South Africa for Natal from 1978 to 1984.

Wilkins was a right-handed batsman and played 357 innings in 198 matches with an average of 32.63 and a top score of 156. He also played 91 innings in 91 one-day matches. He was a right-arm medium-pace bowler and took 142 first-class wickets at an average of 35.50 and a best performance of 4 for 19. In the one-day game he took 80 wickets with a best performance of 5 for 40. He was also an occasional wicket-keeper.

Wilkins' brother Andrew and uncle Albert also played first-class cricket in South Africa, Andrew also appearing for Border at the same time as his brother's early career was taking off.
