= Jeremy Moir =

Scottish former cricketer

Personal information
- Full name: Jeremy David Moir
- Born: 13 April 1957 (age 69); Imtarfa, British Malta
- Batting: Right-handed
- Bowling: Right-arm medium
- Relatives: Dallas Moir (twin brother)

Domestic team information
- Years: Team
- 1989–1992: Scotland

Career statistics
Competition	First-class	List A
Matches	2	14
Runs scored	28	42
Batting average	14.00	42.00
100s/50s	0/0	0/0
Top score	15	11*
Balls bowled	315	853
Wickets	3	7
Bowling average	46.33	79.85
5 wickets in innings	0	0
10 wickets in match	0	0
Best bowling	2/47	2/47
Catches/stumpings	1/–	1/–
- Source: Cricinfo, 28 June 2022

Jeremy David Moir (born 13 April 1957) is a Maltese-born Scottish former cricketer.

A twin, Moir was born in April 1957 to Scottish parents who lived in British Malta. Shortly after his birth, his parents moved to Norway, where they spent four years. They subsequently returned to Scotland, where Moir was educated at Aberdeen Grammar School. He made his debut for Scotland in a List A one-day match against Yorkshire at Leeds in the 1989 NatWest Trophy. He played one-day cricket for Scotland until 1992, making fourteen appearances across the Benson & Hedges Cup and the NatWest Trophy. Playing as a bowler in the Scottish side, Moir struggled against county opposition, taking 7 wickets at an expensive average of 79.85. In addition to playing one-day cricket for Scotland, Moir also appeared in two first-class matches against Ireland at Dublin in 1989 and Edinburgh in 1990. His twin brother, Dallas, was also a cricketer.
