= Brian Bolus =

English cricketer (1934–2020)

Personal information
- Full name: John Brian Bolus
- Born: 31 January 1934; Whitkirk, Leeds, England
- Died: 7 May 2020 (aged 86)
- Batting: Right-handed
- Bowling: Left-arm medium
- Role: Opening batsman

International information
- National side: England
- Test debut: 25 July 1963 v West Indies
- Last Test: 15 February 1964 v India

Domestic team information
- Years: Team
- 1956–1962: Yorkshire
- 1963–1972: Nottinghamshire
- 1973–1976: Derbyshire

Career statistics
Competition	Test	FC	LA
Matches	7	469	143
Runs scored	496	25,598	3,110
Batting average	41.33	34.03	24.29
100s/50s	0/4	39/142	1/18
Top score	88	202*	100*
Balls bowled	18	1,736	6
Wickets	0	24	0
Bowling average	–	36.91	–
5 wickets in innings	–	0	–
10 wickets in match	–	0	–
Best bowling	–	4/40	–
Catches/stumpings	2/–	201/–	44/–
- Source: CricketArchive, 28 March 2010

John Brian Bolus (31 January 1934 – 7 May 2020) was an English cricketer who played in seven Test matches from 1963 to 1964. Cricket commentator Colin Bateman stated, "Bolus was essentially an accumulator, dependably totting up 25,000 runs over 20 summers".

== Life and career ==
Bolus was born in Whitkirk, Leeds, Yorkshire. He learned his cricket with Whitkirk before moving to Leeds in 1953, and then to Bradford.

He began his first-class career in his native Yorkshire in 1956, playing for seven years. His first-class debut was Yorkshire versus M.C.C., at Lords, in 1956. He played 107 matches for Yorkshire, with a highest score of 146 not out against Hampshire at Portsmouth in 1960. His best bowling figures were 4 for 40 against Pakistan at Park Avenue in 1962.

He moved on to Nottinghamshire in 1963, after Yorkshire opted for a relative unknown, Geoffrey Boycott, who was six years younger. For Nottinghamshire he played 269 matches, with a highest score of 202 not out against Glamorgan at Trent Bridge in 1963, and best bowling figures of 2 for 24 against the West Indies, also at Trent Bridge in 1966. In his debut List A cricket match for Nottinghamshire against Yorkshire in 1963, he scored 100 not out in his team's total of only 159: the lowest all-out total to include a century in List A cricket's history. He was made county captain in 1972.

Bolus became the third player to be capped by three counties, and the first to captain two different county sides in successive seasons, when he moved to Derbyshire in 1973. He played 64 matches for Derbyshire, with a highest score of 151 against Oxford University at the Bass Worthington Ground in Burton upon Trent in 1975.

He twice scored more than one thousand runs in a season whilst playing for Yorkshire, as well as ten times for Nottinghamshire and twice for Derbyshire.

A solid county performer, particularly strong off his pads, his Test batting average of 41.33 is higher than his overall first-class average of 34.03. He was unlucky not to play more Tests, particularly after a strong tour of India in 1963/64. He hit the first ball he faced in Test cricket, bowled by Wes Hall, back over the bowler's head for four. He was unable to convert any of his four Test fifties to three figures, and found himself overtaken in the international reckoning by Geoff Boycott and John Edrich. Bolus does hold two unusual Test match records - the most Tests in a complete career without ever recording a single figure score (seven), and the most Test Match innings in a complete career without ever recording a single figure score (twelve).

In May 1975, Bolus asked to be relieved of the Derbyshire captaincy, and was replaced by Bob Taylor. Bolus effectively retired at the end of the 1975 season, with over 25,500 first-class runs to his name. However, he then appeared twice in the B and H cup at the start of the 1976 season. He became an England Test selector in the 1990s. After his first-class career he took an appointment with Gedling Council in Nottingham in 1976, while also playing for Bradford. Later he played for Cleckheaton, Brighouse and Farsley, leading the team to a Priestley Cup win in 1983. He was an Honorary Life Member of Whitkirk Cricket Club.

He is one of the small band of captains to send off one of his own players, dismissing the Derbyshire and England paceman Alan Ward from the Queen's Park, Chesterfield, ground in 1973 after Ward had declined to resume bowling.

In his later after dinner speech career, Bolus opened with the line, "For those of you who saw me bat... let me apologise".

Sporting positions
Preceded by Gary Sobers	Nottinghamshire County cricket captain 1972	Succeeded by Gary Sobers
Preceded by Ian Buxton	Derbyshire cricket captains 1973– May 1975	Succeeded by Bob Taylor
