= Robert Swindell =

English cricketer

Robert Swindell (born 22 January 1950) is an English former cricketer. He was a right-handed batsman and a right-arm offbreak bowler who played for Derbyshire between 1972 and 1977.

Having represented the Second XI since 1968, Swindell made his County Championship debut in 1972 in a draw against Surrey. Economical with the ball, he did not make a batting contribution throughout the match. He played extensively throughout the 1972 season which saw Derbyshire rooted to the foot of the Championship table, though he was to play against a team of West Indians early in the following season.

He played little throughout the following five seasons and finished his first-class career with an expensive bowling return and little to show from his batting against an in-form Gloucestershire side. Swindell was part of the Derbyshire tailend attack along with teammate Mike Hendrick during the early 1970s.

Swindell played with the Second XI until 1978 and exited the game that summer, though he played one match with the Marylebone Cricket Club (MCC) in 1983.
