= Phil Sharpe (cricketer) =

English cricketer

Personal information
- Full name: Philip John Sharpe
- Born: 27 December 1936; Shipley, West Yorkshire, England
- Died: 19 May 2014 (aged 77)
- Batting: Right-handed
- Bowling: Right-arm offbreak
- Role: Batsman

International information
- National side: England
- Test debut (cap 416): 4 July 1963 v West Indies
- Last Test: 21 August 1969 v New Zealand

Career statistics
Competition	Test	FC	LA
Matches	12	493	133
Runs scored	786	22,530	2,611
Batting average	46.23	30.73	21.57
100s/50s	1/4	29/111	2/13
Top score	111	228	114*
Balls bowled	–	302	4
Wickets	–	3	0
Bowling average	–	65.66	–
5 wickets in innings	–	0	–
10 wickets in match	–	0	–
Best bowling	–	1/1	–
Catches/stumpings	17/–	618/–	77/–
- Source: ESPNcricinfo, 22 May 2023

Philip John Sharpe (27 December 1936 – 20 May 2014) was an English cricketer, who played in twelve Test matches from 1963 to 1969, and was one of the Wisden Cricketers of the Year in 1963. He played all of his county cricket for Yorkshire and Derbyshire, and played in Minor counties cricket for Norfolk. However he was despised by Geoff Boycott because of what Boycott perceived as his “social, rather weak and insipid attitude towards cricket”.

The cricketing correspondent Colin Bateman remarked, "Phil Sharpe was possibly unique in that he was selected by England for his exceptional catching ability in the slips."

== Life and career ==
Born on 27 December 1936 at Shipley, West Yorkshire, Sharpe attended public school, Worksop College, in the 1950s where he scored a 240 not out against Wrekin in 1955, a batting record which still stands. Most of his first-class cricket career was spent with his home county, Yorkshire, but he later moved on to Derbyshire. He was renowned for his excellent slip fielding, which yielded him over 600 catches.

In 1963, Sharpe was picked by the selectors for his catching abilities to face the West Indies at Edgbaston. Although he was an accomplished and talented middle-order batsman, the England team had been guilty in previous matches of dropping crucial catches, particularly behind the wicket. However, after half a dozen mediocre performances, Sharpe was discarded until, in 1969, he was recalled for much the same reason as his original selection. He responded by taking a total of seventeen catches, batted more consistently, including recording his maiden Test century against New Zealand at Trent Bridge that same year, but he suffered from the fact that England had no upcoming winter tour. His twelfth and final Test was at The Oval in August 1969, though he played in the first Test against the Rest of the World in 1970 – a match that at the time carried Test status. His Test average of 46.23 was better than many, before and since, who have spent longer in the national side.

Sharpe went on to win seven County Championships with Yorkshire. His catch, standing close in against the West Indies at Old Trafford in 1969, to dismiss Joey Carew was described by Wisden, in their classic style of understatement, as "memorable" though others thought it miraculous.

After his playing days were over, Sharpe served as an England Test selector. He died after a short illness on 20 May 2014.
