= Robert Wincer =

English cricketer

Personal information
- Full name: Robert Colin Wincer
- Born: 2 April 1952 (age 74); Portsmouth, Hampshire, England
- Batting: Left-handed
- Bowling: Right-arm fast-medium

Domestic team information
- Years: Team
- 1978 to 1980: Derbyshire

Career statistics
Competition	First-class	List A
Matches	23	16
Runs scored	131	19
Batting average	10.07	3.80
100s/50s	0/0	0/0
Top score	26	11
Balls bowled	2803	667
Wickets	46	9
Bowling average	35.93	48.33
5 wickets in innings	0	0
10 wickets in match	0	n/a
Best bowling	4/42	2/28
Catches/stumpings	8/–	1/–
- Source: Cricinfo, 30 August 2019

Robert Colin Wincer (born 2 April 1952) is a former English cricketer who played for Derbyshire between 1978 and 1980.

Wincer was born at Portsmouth and initially played for Leicestershire's Second XI in 1975. Wincer joined Derbyshire in the 1978 season. He played throughout the 1978 season, including in the Benson & Hedges Cup final. He continued into the 1979 season, and played with Derbyshire against a team of touring Indians. Despite having a steady season in 1980, he was released and moved over full-time to South Africa working for the Natal Cricket Association. Wincer was a right-arm medium-fast bowler and left-handed batsman who played at the tailend. He spent several years in Durban, South Africa playing and coaching in Natal. He was chosen to play for South African Country Districts side to play against the rebel Australian side in Nelspriut. He captained both Northern Districts and Natal Country districts. He continued his playing and coaching in Adelaide, South Australia where he played and coached for Tea Tree Gully in first grade cricket until his retirement in 1994. Wincer was also involved in playing and coaching in football in UK, South Africa and Australia. He worked across South Africa with the late Bill McGarry (Wolves and Newcastle United) and coached Newcastle Dynamoes before moving on to Australia where he coached Salisbury United, Elizabeth City FC. and the South Australian State U15's side, and senior side. He became involved in scouting for Leeds United out in Australia and eventually set up an academy and managed two other academy sites for them in Adelaide, Perth and Sydney, New South Wales. Wincer has coached football extensively in Abu Dhabi and in United States (New York State and New Hampshire). Since his return to the UK in football in 2005 he has worked for Leicester City and Newcastle United in a scouting capacity. In cricket he has been coach/manager of Yorkshire U15's sides. Robert Wincer also taught physics at multiple schools in the late 2000 to early 2010s.
