= Christopher Armishaw =

English cricketer

Christopher John Armishaw (22 September 1952 – 12 March 2016) was an English cricketer who played List A cricket for Derbyshire. Armishaw was born in Willington, Derbyshire and joined Derbyshire in the season of 1970. He made occasional appearances for the Second XI over three years, and appeared in three Warwick Pool matches in 1972 and 1973.

During the 1973 season, he played in four John Player League matches and one Gillette Cup game for Derbyshire. Armishaw was a right-handed batsman, and a right-arm medium pace bowler. He took a four wicket haul on his List A debut, his career-best figures. Seven of his eight career runs came in his second List A appearance, against Glamorgan.
