= Colin Tunnicliffe =

English cricketer

Colin John Tunnicliffe (born 11 August 1951) is a former English cricketer who played first-class cricket for Derbyshire between 1973 and 1983.

== Biography ==
Tunnicliffe was born in Derby. He appeared for Derbyshire Juniors from 1968 and played for Derbyshire Second XI in one match during the 1971 Second XI Championship. In the 1973 season he made his debut in the County Championship against Essex when he expensively took no wickets for 81 runs although he was not out in both innings. He played regularly in 1973 and 1974. However, he did not play at all in 1975, and in 1976 played one first-class match and five games in the John Player League. He returned to regular appearances in 1977 and continued to play in Derbyshire's first team and one day competitions until 1983, staying on top of his game for much of this period. He achieved his best bowling performance of 7 for 36 against Essex in 1980. In the 1981 season, Tunnicliffe scored the winning run, which tied the scores with Derbyshire having lost fewer wickets, on the last ball of the NatWest Trophy final against Northamptonshire.

In his final season in 1983 Tunnicliffe made his top score of 91 against Hampshire.

Tunnicliffe was a left-arm medium-fast bowler and took 319 first-class wickets with an average of 32.17 and a best performance of 7-36. He also took 190 wickets in one-day competitions, with a best performance of 5 for 24. He was a right-handed batsman and played 176 innings in 150 first-class matches with an average of 14.32 and a top score of 91 not out. Added to Derbyshire's lower-order defence of the early-80s, Tunnicliffe was just as effective in the lower-order as he was tenacious as a tailender. He made six half-centuries in his first-class career. He also played 105 innings in 167 one day matches.

After retirement from playing cricket, Tunnicliffe was commercial manager at Derbyshire County Cricket Club and later at Derby County Football Club.

Tunnicliffe now lives in Derby.
