= Peter Kirsten =

South African cricketer

Personal information
- Full name: Peter Noel Kirsten
- Born: 14 May 1955 (age 71); Pietermaritzburg, Natal, South Africa
- Batting: Right-handed
- Bowling: Right arm offbreak
- Relatives: Noel Kirsten (father); Paul Kirsten (brother); Gary Kirsten (brother); Andy Kirsten (brother)

International information
- National side: South Africa
- Test debut (cap 240): 18 April 1992 v West Indies
- Last Test: 18 August 1994 v England
- ODI debut (cap 4): 10 November 1991 v India
- Last ODI: 25 August 1994 v England

Domestic team information
- Years: Team
- 1973/74–1989/90: Western Province
- 1975: Sussex
- 1978–1982: Derbyshire
- 1990/91–1996/97: Border

Career statistics
Competition	Test	ODI	FC	LA
Matches	12	40	327	358
Runs scored	626	1293	22,635	11,403
Batting average	31.30	38.02	44.46	35.63
100s/50s	1/4	0/9	57/107	10/83
Top score	104	97	271	134*
Balls bowled	54	183	10,287	4,620
Wickets	0	6	117	95
Bowling average	–	25.33	40.01	34.14
5 wickets in innings	–	0	2	2
10 wickets in match	–	0	0	0
Best bowling	–	3/31	6/48	6/17
Catches/stumpings	8/–	11/–	190/–	120/–
- Source: Cricinfo, 5 January 2014

Peter Noel Kirsten (born 14 May 1955) is a former cricketer who represented South Africa in 12 Test matches and 40 One Day Internationals from 1991 to 1994. He was appointed coach of the Ugandan national side in August 2014.

== Cricket career ==
Kirsten first attended Selborne Primary in East London, and in 1966 scored his first century at the age of ten. In 1967 the family moved to Cape Town and Kirsten was enrolled at the oldest school in the country, South African College School, also known as SACS. Kirsten represented Western Province at schools level in both rugby (Craven Week 1972–73) and cricket (Nuffield Week 1971-72-73). Kirsten made his debut for Western Province in first-class cricket while still at school, scoring 72 runs in the second innings. At the end of the 1973 Nuffield Week, he was selected for the South African Schools team. In the subsequent match against the Northern Transvaal first-class team he scored a century. He became only the fifth schoolboy to achieve this feat.

After enrolling at Stellenbosch University he played for S.A. Universities in 1976 and 1977, scoring centuries in both matches he played in. In 1978 he played for Western Province against S.A. Universities, again scoring a century. During the 1976–77 South African first-class cricket season he scored six centuries in seven innings. Kirsten became a professional cricketer in 1978. He played for Derbyshire from 1978 to 1982 in 106 matches, scoring 7,722 runs at an average of 49.50. In South Africa he played for Western Province in 133 matches, scoring 9,087 runs at an average of 41.88. He captained Western Province for three seasons during the 1980s, achieving the first-class and One Day Tournament series double in 1981–82.

He represented South Africa in all 19 unofficial Rebel Test matches from 1982 to 1989, scoring 1,192 runs at an average of 41.10. Kirsten also captained South Africa in 6 of these matches, winning 4 times, losing 1 and drawing 1. During his first-class career he scored centuries in both innings of a match on three occasions, as well as eight double centuries, still the most by a South African batsman. In 1990 he moved to East London and became captain of the newly promoted Border team.

At the end of 1991, South Africa was invited to rejoin the International Cricket Conference, and went on their first ever tour of India. Kirsten played in all three ODIs, scoring 86 not out in the final match, earning him the man of the match award. Controversy surrounded the selection of the 1992 World Cup team, when Clive Rice, Jimmy Cook and Kirsten were omitted from the preliminary team. All three players were stalwarts of South African cricket during the exile years. Kirsten was eventually recalled to the team and became the team's most prolific run scorer at the tournament.

Kirsten made his Test debut in 1992 against the West Indies, aged 36 years and 340 days, scoring 52 in the second innings. On the 1994 South African cricket tour of England he scored a first-class century against Sussex, before aged 39 years and 84 days, he scored his first and only Test century against England at Headingley.

Peter Kirsten finished his career with 626 Test runs and 1,293 ODI runs.

== Personal life ==
Kirsten married his wife Tuffy in 1983. After retiring from cricket he published a biography with Telford Vice, In the nick of time.

Kirsten comes from a sporting family. His father, Noël Kirsten, played first-class cricket for Border. Peter, his younger brother, Andy, and half-brothers Gary and Paul, represented Western Province. Gary also played in 101 cricket Tests for South Africa.

== Rugby ==
In 1974, Kirsten played flyhalf for Western Province under-20 in a curtain raiser to the first test between the Springboks and the British & Irish Lions at Newlands Stadium in Cape Town. In wet conditions his ball handling abilities so impressed journalist John Reason, that special mention of this was made in his book, The Unbeaten Lions. Kirsten, aged 19, was selected to play for the Quaggas against the touring Lions. He scored 12 points as his team was defeated by 16 – 20. Following the Lions-Quagga game, he was duly selected to play for the Western Province rugby team, but in only his third match, he severely damaged his knee. It would take him out of rugby permanently.
