= 1978 English cricket season =

The 1978 English cricket season was the 79th in which the County Championship had been an official competition. There were growing concerns about the impact of World Series Cricket (WSC). On the domestic front, Kent won the County Championship despite Alan Knott and Derek Underwood having joined WSC. England defeated New Zealand 3–0 and Pakistan 2–0.

== Honours ==
- County Championship - Kent
- Gillette Cup - Sussex
- Sunday League - Hampshire
- Benson & Hedges Cup - Kent
- Minor Counties Championship - Devon
- Second XI Championship - Sussex II
- Wisden - David Gower, John Lever, Chris Old, Clive Radley, John Shepherd

== Annual reviews ==
- Playfair Cricket Annual 1979
- Wisden Cricketers' Almanack 1979
