= Alan Morris (cricketer) =

English cricketer (born 1953)

Personal information
- Full name: Alan Morris
- Born: 23 August 1953 (age 73); Staveley, Derbyshire, England
- Batting: Right-handed
- Bowling: Leg break

Domestic team information
- Years: Team
- 1974–1978: Derbyshire
- 1979/80: Griqualand West

Career statistics
Competition	First-class	List A
Matches	49	21
Runs scored	1,188	290
Batting average	15.63	18.12
100s/50s	–/4	–/–
Top score	74	49
Balls bowled	153	0
Wickets	0	–
Bowling average	–	–
5 wickets in innings	–	–
10 wickets in match	–	–
Best bowling	–	–
Catches/stumpings	31/–	5/–
- Source: Cricinfo, 1 July 2022

Alan Morris (born 23 August 1953) was an English first-class cricketer. He was a right-handed batsman and a leg-break bowler. He played first-class cricket between 1974 and 1980.

Morris's first-class career began at Derbyshire in 1974, having spent three previous seasons in the Second XI. His first-class debut came in the disastrous 1974 County Championship season, playing out a draw with Essex, and, for the next three years, he was a regular for the Derbyshire team. At the end of the 1977 Championship, however, he saw fewer and fewer appearances in the Derbyshire team, despite their moderately impressive showing that year, and their final league position of seventh.

Morris played sporadically during the 1978 season, before spending a year out of the first-class game. Towards the end of his first-class career, he played two games with Griqualand West in the 1979/80 Castle Bowl tournament. Griqualand finished bottom of the table that year and Morris was to exit professional cricket.

Morris was an upper-middle-order batsman for both Derbyshire and Griqualand West.
