= Ashley Harvey-Walker =

English cricketer

Personal information
- Full name: Ashley John Harvey-Walker
- Born: 21 July 1944; East Ham, London, England
- Died: 28 April 1997 (aged 52); Johannesburg, South Africa
- Batting: Right-handed
- Bowling: Right-arm medium; Right-arm offbreak
- Role: All-rounder

Domestic team information
- Years: Team
- 1971–1978: Derbyshire
- FC debut: 23 June 1971 Derbyshire v Oxford Univ.
- Last FC: 18 July 1978 Derbyshire v Worcestershire
- LA debut: 20 June 1971 Derbyshire v Lancashire
- Last LA: 13 August 1978 Derbyshire v Middlesex

Career statistics
Competition	First-class	List A
Matches	81	91
Runs scored	3,186	1,829
Batting average	23.95	22.03
100s/50s	3/19	0/8
Top score	117	84
Balls bowled	2,352	418
Wickets	34	9
Bowling average	33.82	34.22
5 wickets in innings	1	0
10 wickets in match	1	0
Best bowling	7/35	4/37
Catches/stumpings	31/–	29/–
- Source: CricketArchive, 28 April 2010

Ashley John Harvey-Walker (21 July 1944 – 28 April 1997) was an English cricketer who played first-class cricket for Derbyshire from 1971 to 1978. He was shot dead in a Johannesburg bar.

== Hundred on debut ==
Harvey-Walker was born in East Ham, London and educated at Strathallan School in Perthshire, where he was in the first XI for five years. After school he joined Warwickshire in 1963 and played for the second XI team. He moved to Derbyshire in 1967 where he also played in the second XI. In the 1971 season he made his first team debut. He became the first Derbyshire cricketer to score a century on his debut scoring an unbeaten 110 against Oxford University at Burton-on-Trent.

== Career ==
Harvey-Walker was a right-handed batsman and a right-arm off-break and medium-pace bowler. Early in his career he played purely as a top order batsman, though he struggled to hold down a regular place in a weak batting side. His best season was in 1974 when he scored 727 runs at 25.96, and also scored 448 List 'A' runs.

In June 1975, during a match between Derbyshire and Lancashire at Buxton, a highly unseasonal snowstorm took place. To that date, it was the only first-class cricket match in history whereby, 'snow stopped play', in what was one of the hottest summers on record. Shortly after the thaw set in, Harvey-Walker came out to bat and surprised square leg umpire Dickie Bird by asking him to look after his false teeth, wrapped in a handkerchief, because he wouldn't be in for long!

Not regarded as a regular bowler much beforehand, he was regularly employed when selected in the 1978 season, taking 10–82, including 7–35 in the second innings against Surrey on the notoriously uncertain wicket at Ilkeston. Despite playing in the 1978 Benson & Hedges Cup Final he was not re-engaged at the end of the season in a general clearout by the county.

Following his release from Derbyshire, he played for Undercliffe Cricket Club in the Bradford Cricket League and then emigrated to South Africa. He was working as assistant groundsman at the Wanderers Stadium in Johnannesburg, and only a month before his death had helped to prepare the pitch for the Test against Australia.

== Death ==
On 28 April 1997, at the age of 52, Harvey-Walker was shot dead at a private club in the Berea neighbourhood of Johannesburg. Apparently, a gunman walked into the bar, called out Harvey-Walker's name, and shot him when he responded.

== See also ==
- List of cricketers who were murdered
