= Harold Cartwright =

English cricketer

Harold "Harry" Cartwright (born 12 May 1951) is a former English cricketer who played cricket for Derbyshire between 1971 and 1979.

Cartwright was born at Halfway, Derbyshire. He began his career in the Derbyshire Second XI in 1971 and played matches in the John Player League during the 1971 season. His debut first-class game during the 1973 season, a defeat against Warwickshire. Later in the season he played against the travelling New Zealanders, as Derbyshire finished 1973 with a mere two victories.

Cartwright continued for a year in the first team, and, despite only playing a single first-team match throughout the 1975 season, was back into the first team in 1976 after an impressive run for the Second XI. He continued in the first team until 1979, scoring a half century in his final County Championship game in 1979. The Derbyshire native recorded one first-class century, a 141* against Warwickshire in 1977.

With the Derbyshire first team, Cartwright was an upper-middle-order batsman. He was a right-handed batsman and a wicket-keeper

Cartwright played in the Final of the Tilcon Trophy in 1977, and, for Bassetlaw and District Cricket League, in the 1987 LCC President's Trophy final. He played one match with Marylebone Cricket Club in 1995.
