= Lloyd Budd (cricketer) =

English cricketer and umpire

Personal information
- Full name: William Lloyd Budd
- Born: 25 October 1913; Hawkley, Hampshire, England
- Died: 23 August 1986 (aged 72); Southampton, Hampshire, England
- Batting: Right-handed
- Bowling: Right-arm fast-medium

Domestic team information
- Years: Team
- 1934-1946: Hampshire

Umpiring information
- Tests umpired: 4 (1976–1978)
- ODIs umpired: 12 (1974–1979)
- FC umpired: 267 (1969–1984)
- LA umpired: 233 (1969–1985)

Career statistics
Competition	First-class
Matches	60
Runs scored	941
Batting average	11.47
100s/50s	–/2
Top score	77*
Balls bowled	4,827
Wickets	64
Bowling average	39.15
5 wickets in innings	–
10 wickets in match	–
Best bowling	4/22
Catches/stumpings	24/–
- Source: Cricinfo, 26 June 2023

William Lloyd Budd (25 October 1913 – 23 August 1986) was an English first-class cricketer and international cricket umpire. Budd initially played first-class cricket for Hampshire County Cricket Club between 1934 and 1938, and briefly following the Second World War. He later became an umpire, standing in four Test matches and twelve One Day Internationals from 1976 to 1979.

== Playing career ==
Budd was born in October 1913 at Hawkley, Hampshire. A right-arm fast-medium bowler and a hard-hitting lower order batsman, Budd made his debut in first-class cricket for Hampshire against Leicestershire at Bournemouth in the 1934 County Championship. He appeared infrequently, but was utilised the most by Hampshire in 1935 and 1937, when he played in 22 and 19 matches respectively. Following the 1938 season, Budd retired from playing to become a police officer with the Southampton City Police; the occasion was celebrated with a farewell match between a team captained by Budd and another captained by Walter Pearce. Prior to this, he had appeared for Hampshire in 56 first-class matches and taken 61 wickets, though these had come at a high average. As a batsman he played two innings of note, putting on 125 for the last wicket with Alec Hosie against Glamorgan in 1935, and making 77 not out against Surrey in 1937.

Budd continued to serve in the police during the Second World War, during which he played exhibition matches for Southampton Police against the Metropolitan Police, in addition to playing for the London Counties cricket team. Following the war, he resumed playing first-class cricket for Hampshire, making four appearances in the 1946 County Championship. An additional three wickets took his career tally to 64, at an average of 30.15 and with best figures of 4 for 22. With the bat, he scored 941 runs at a batting average of 11.47. Following the end of his first-class career, Budd played club cricket in Southampton for Deanery Cricket Club.

== Umpiring career ==
Following a gap of over twenty years from senior cricket, Budd first stood as an umpire in senior cricket in April 1969, in a List A one-day match between Essex and Kent. The following month, he officiated in first-class cricket for the first time. Budd officiated in his first international match in 1974, when England played Pakistan in a One Day International (ODI) at Trent Bridge. The following year, he umpired in four matches in the World Cup. Budd stood in his first Test match alongside Bill Alley in 1976, when England played the West Indies at Old Trafford. The match was controversial due to the West Indian bowlers, led by Michael Holding, subjecting the England batsman, notably openers John Edrich and Brian Close, to a barrage of bouncers. Both Budd and Alley did not initially intervene to reprimand the West Indies for their excessive use of the bouncer. Pat Pocock considered Budd's lack of action as being down to him standing in his first Test match and not wanting to rock the boat; eventually, after 162 minutes of hostile bowling, Alley issued a reprimand for 'intimidation'. Following the match, there were calls to ban the use of bouncers, with the Marylebone Cricket Club responding with only a marginal strengthening of the regulations governing their use.

As part of the Silver Jubilee of Elizabeth II, Budd, alongside Dickie Bird and the English and Australian teams, met The Queen and The Queen Mother at Clarence House, during the first Test of the 1977 Ashes Series. He stood in two Tests during the series, and the following year he stood in his fourth and final Test match between England and Pakistan. He stood in four matches in the 1979 World Cup, which were the last of the twelve ODI's he officiated in. Budd retired from the first-class umpires list at the end of the 1982 season, but subsequently returned to umpire a handful of first-class and List A matches to 1985. He umpired in a total of 267 first-class and 233 List A matches. Wisden noted that "apart from war service with the county police, his whole life was given to cricket, playing, coaching or umpiring". Budd died in hospital at Southampton on 23 August 1986.

== See also ==
- List of Test cricket umpires
- List of One Day International cricket umpires
