= Mike Hendrick =

English cricketer (1948–2021)

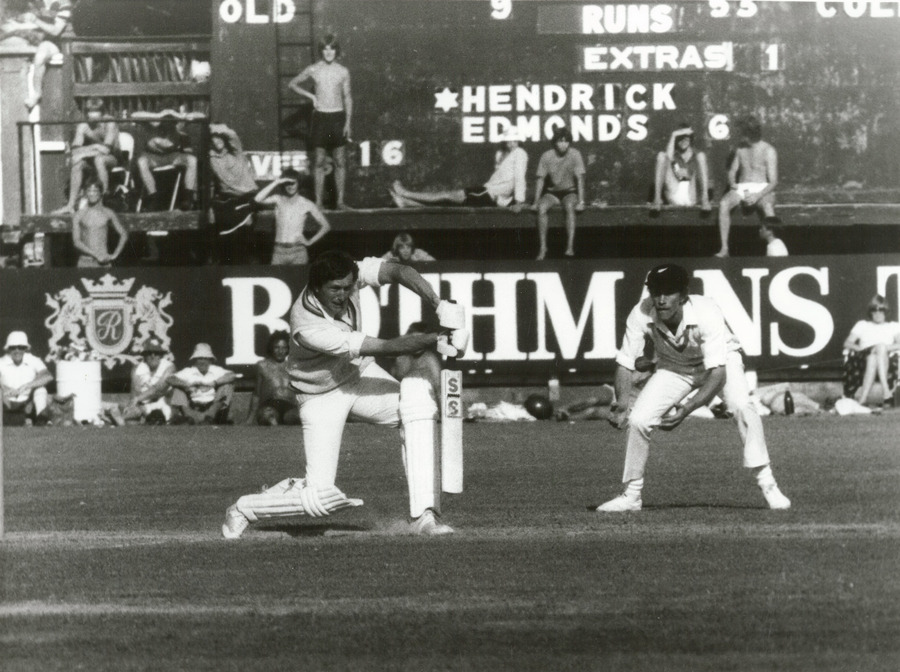
- Hendrick batting vs NZ, February 1978

Personal information
- Full name: Michael Hendrick
- Born: 22 October 1948; Darley Dale, Derbyshire, England
- Died: 27 July 2021 (aged 72)
- Nickname: Hendo
- Height: 190 cm (6 ft 3 in)
- Batting: Right-handed
- Bowling: Right arm fast-medium
- Role: Bowler

International information
- National side: England
- Test debut (cap 459): 6 June 1974 v India
- Last Test: 1 September 1981 v Australia
- ODI debut (cap 22): 5 September 1973 v West Indies
- Last ODI: 8 June 1981 v Australia

Domestic team information
- Years: Team
- 1982–1984: Nottinghamshire
- 1969–1981: Derbyshire

Career statistics
Competition	Test	ODI	FC	LA
Matches	30	22	267	226
Runs scored	128	6	1,601	503
Batting average	6.40	1.20	10.13	9.31
100s/50s	0/0	0/0	0/0	0/0
Top score	15	2*	46	32
Balls bowled	6,208	1,248	42,378	11,385
Wickets	87	35	770	297
Bowling average	25.83	19.45	20.50	19.59
5 wickets in innings	0	1	30	5
10 wickets in match	0	0	3	0
Best bowling	4/28	5/31	8/45	6/7
Catches/stumpings	25/–	5/–	176/–	51/–
Medal record
Men's Cricket
Representing England
ICC Cricket World Cup
Runner-up	1979 England
- Source: Cricinfo, 4 May 2009

Michael Hendrick (22 October 1948 – 26 July 2021) was an English cricketer, who played in thirty Tests and twenty-two One Day Internationals for England from 1973 to 1981. He played for Derbyshire from 1969 to 1981, and for Nottinghamshire from 1982 to 1984. He was a part of the English squad which finished as runners-up at the 1979 Cricket World Cup.

Cricket correspondent Colin Bateman remarked, "Hendrick was a lively fast-medium seam bowler who could produce plenty of bounce to trouble county batsmen. His 770 first-class wickets came at an impressive cost of just 20 apiece". Bateman added, "...he loved to pin batsmen down with his accuracy and force errors, and to do so he bowled negatively and slightly short – too short to take wickets consistently at the top level".

== Early life ==
Hendrick was born in Darley Dale, Derbyshire, on 22 October 1948. He attended St Mary’s Grammar School in Darlington. He first played for Leicestershire Juniors in 1965 and progressed to the Second XI in 1966, playing regularly over the next three years. However, he was ultimately released by the county. Hendrick later made his first-class debut for Derbyshire in June 1969 against Oxford University, when he took a wicket in each innings but did not have a chance to bat. He played one County Championship match in the season, and also took part in the Player's County League.

== Career ==
Hendrick played five first-class games in 1970. From 1971, he became a more regular first team player, and in 1973 played in a One Day International against the West Indies. He was Cricket Writers' Club Young Cricketer of the Year in 1973. One year later, Hendrick played in three Test matches against India and two against Pakistan.

In the winter of 1974/75, Hendrick toured with the Marylebone Cricket Club (MCC) to Australia and New Zealand, playing in three Test matches. He played for England in two matches against the West Indies in 1976 and, in 1977, played in the third, fourth and fifth Test against the Australians. In February 1978, he played one match against New Zealand in New Zealand, and later in the summer played two Test matches against the New Zealanders in England. He was a Wisden Cricketer of the Year in 1978. He toured Australia in the winter of 1978/79, and played in five Ashes Test matches, taking nineteen wickets in the series. In the summer of 1979, he played for England against India in four matches and, in 1980, against the West Indies and a single match against Australia. He played his last Test matches against Australia in 1981, and in the same season, helped Derbyshire win the National Westminster Bank Trophy. He left Derbyshire at the end of the season, and moved to Nottinghamshire, where he played until 1984. He also elected to go on the first rebel tour to South Africa in 1981–82, which incurred a three-year ban from Test cricket and effectively ended his international participation.

Hendrick lacked express pace but was hazardous on a green wicket, as his command of seam bowling was considered to be excellent. He could make the ball do "disappearing acts" on cloudy days, but he came to "curse clear skies and sunshine". Dennis Lillee once described him as a good bowler in the "right conditions". His best Test bowling figures of 4–28 came against India in 1974. He holds the record for taking the highest number of wickets in Test cricket amongst bowlers without having a five wicket haul in a Test innings.

== Later life ==
After retiring from playing, Hendrick was popular on the after-dinner speech circuit, in the radio commentary box, and in a short spell as an umpire. He became the coach at Trent Bridge in 1992. He was appointed as the Ireland cricket team's first full-time head coach in 1995. His tenure included victories at the European Cricket Championship and British Isles Championship in 1996, and a defeat to Scotland in the third-place play-off at the 1997 ICC Trophy which saw Ireland narrowly miss out on its first Cricket World Cup berth. His contract was terminated in 1999 but he returned to Ireland as bowling coach at the 2007 Cricket World Cup.

Hendrick was diagnosed with bowel cancer in 2019. In an interview two years later on the 40th anniversary of the 1981 Ashes series, he said that he was "in the departure lounge, but the flight has not quite left yet". He died on 26 July 2021, at age 72.
