= Derbyshire County Cricket Club in 1969 =

1969 season of an English cricket team

Derbyshire County Cricket Club seasons
1969 season
- Captain: Derek Morgan
- County Championship: 16
- John Player League: 15
- Gillette Cup: Runners-up
- Most runs: Peter Gibbs
- Most wickets: Harold Rhodes
- Most catches: Bob Taylor

Derbyshire County Cricket Club in 1969 represents the cricket season when the English club Derbyshire had been playing for ninety-eight years. They were runners-up in the Gillette Cup. In the County Championship, they won three matches to finish sixteenth in their sixty-fifth season in the Championship. In the first season of the John Player League they ended fifteenth after winning five matches.

== 1969 season ==
Derbyshire played 24 games in the County Championship, one match against Oxford University, and one against the touring New Zealanders. They won three first class matches altogether and lost five, the majority of matches ending in a draw. Derbyshire reached the final of the Gillette Cup where they lost to Yorkshire. This was the season in which the Sunday League was introduced and Derbyshire won five matches in the one-day games to finish fifteenth. Derek Morgan was in his fifth season as captain. Peter Gibbs scored most runs overall although Michael Page was top scorer in the County Championship. Harold Rhodes took most wickets.

== Matches ==
=== First Class ===
List of matches
No.	Date	V	Result	Margin	Notes
1	3 May 1969	Surrey; Kennington Oval	Drawn		Edrich 105; Ahmed 127
2	17 May 1969	Essex Queen's Park, Chesterfield	Drawn		
3	21 May 1969	Worcestershire; County Ground, Derby	Drawn		
4	24 May 1969	Hampshire; United Services Recreation Ground, Portsmouth	Drawn		Cottam 6-58
5	31 May 1969	Lancashire; Park Road Ground, Buxton	Drawn		
6	4 Jun 1969	Warwickshire; Edgbaston, Birmingham	Drawn		PJK Gibbs 121
7	11 Jun 1969	Yorkshire; Headingley, Leeds	Drawn		MH Page 109
8	14 Jun 1969	Oxford University; County Ground, Derby	Drawn		IR Buxton 7-33
9	18 Jun 1969	Somerset; Queen's Park, Chesterfield	Drawn		PJK Gibbs 138; TJP Eyre 8-65
10	21 Jun 1969	Middlesex; Ind Coope Ground, Burton-on-Trent	Drawn		HJ Rhodes 6-40
11	28 Jun 1969	Nottinghamshire; Trent Bridge, Nottingham	Drawn		
12	5 Jul 1969	New Zealand; Queen's Park, Chesterfield	Drawn		IR Buxton 103
13	9 Jul 1969	Gloucestershire; Wagon Works Ground, Gloucester	Lost	Innings and 10 runs	Allen 6-66
14	12 Jul 1969	Warwickshire; County Ground, Derby	Won	134 runs	A Ward 5-32 and 5-49; HJ Rhodes 5-32; McVicar 5-69
15	19 Jul 1969	Yorkshire; Queen's Park, Chesterfield	Drawn		Wilson 5-114; E Smith 5-73
16	23 Jul 1969	Glamorgan; County Ground, Derby	Lost	Innings and 68 runs	
17	2 Aug 1969	Nottinghamshire; Rutland Recreation Ground, Ilkeston	Drawn		
18	6 Aug 1969	Lancashire; Stanley Park, Blackpool	Won	16 runs	
19	9 Aug 1969	Glamorgan; Sophia Gardens, Cardiff	Drawn		
20	16 Aug 1969	Leicestershire; Queen's Park, Chesterfield	Lost	6 wickets	TJP Eyre 102
21	20 Aug 1969	Northamptonshire; County Ground, Northampton	Lost	4 wickets	Willey 5-78
22	23 Aug 1969	Leicestershire; Grace Road, Leicester	Drawn		Norman 156; MH Page 162
23	30 Aug 1969	Kent; County Ground, Derby	Won	8 wickets	HJ Rhodes 6-17
24	3 Sep 1969	Northamptonshire; Rutland Recreation Ground, Ilkeston	Drawn		JF Harvey 168; Prideaux 120; Mohammad 5-99
25	10 Sep 1969	Sussex; The Saffrons, Eastbourne	Lost	5 runs	A Ward 5-60; Buss 5-27
26	13 Sep 1969	Worcestershire; County Ground, New Road, Worcester	Abandoned		

=== John Player League ===
List of matches
No.	Date	V	Result	Margin	Notes
1	4 May 1969	Surrey; Cheam Road, Sutton	Lost	6 wickets	
2	18 May 1969	Essex; County Ground, Derby	Lost	2 runs	
3	25 May 1969	Sussex; County Ground, Hove	Won	93 runs	
4	1 Jun 1969	Lancashire; Old Trafford, Manchester	Lost	5 wickets	
5	22 Jun 1969	Middlesex; County Ground, Derby	Won	6 wickets	
6	29 Jun 1969	Northamptonshire; Queen's Park, Chesterfield	Lost	6 wickets	
7	6 Jul 1969	Gloucestershire; Ind Coope Ground, Burton-on-Trent	Won	3 wickets	
8	20 Jul 1969	Yorkshire; Bramall Lane, Sheffield	Lost	9 runs	
9	27 Jul 1969	Worcestershire; County Ground, Derby	Won	2 wickets	
10	3 Aug 1969	Nottinghamshire; Queen's Park, Chesterfield	Lost	46 runs	Sobers 5-43
11	10 Aug 1969	Glamorgan; Eugene Cross Park, Ebbw Vale	Lost	49 runs	Kingston 6-36
12	17 Aug 1969	Somerset; Park Road Ground, Buxton	Won	52 runs	
13	24 Aug 1969	Leicestershire; Grace Road, Leicester	Lost	6 runs	
14	31 Aug 1969	Kent; Queen's Park, Chesterfield	Lost	8 wickets	
15	7 Sep 1969	Hampshire; Dean Park, Bournemouth	Lost	82 runs	
16	14 Sep 1969	Warwickshire; Edgbaston, Birmingham	Abandoned		

=== Gillette Cup ===
List of matches
No.	Date	V	Result	Margin	Notes
1st Round	10 May 1969	Somerset; County Ground, Taunton	Won	3 wickets	
2nd Round	7 Jun 1969	Worcestershire; County Ground, Derby	Won	4 wickets	
Quarter-Final	2 Jul 1969	Glamorgan; Sophia Gardens, Cardiff	Won	9 wickets	
Semi-Final	30 Jul 1969	Sussex; Queen's Park, Chesterfield	Won	87 runs	TJP Eyre 6-18
Final	6 Sep 1969	Yorkshire; Lord's Cricket Ground, St John's Wood	Lost	69 runs	

== Statistics ==
=== Competition batting averages ===
Name	County Championship						John Player League						Gillette Cup					
Name	M	I	Runs	HS	Ave	100	M	I	Runs	HS	Ave	100	M	I	Runs	HS	Ave	100
IR Buxton	21	28	581	97	23.24	0	14	14	171	45	12.21	0	5	4	64	34	16.00	0
TJP Eyre	22	28	389	102	16.91	1	15	14	50	15	3.84	0	5	4	19	14*	9.50	0
PJK Gibbs	23	36	871	138*	25.61	2	15	15	378	61	25.20	0	5	5	168	47	33.60	0
IW Hall	9	13	143	26	11.91	0	7	7	86	31*	21.50	0						
JF Harvey	19	24	593	168	26.95	1	10	10	145	40	16.11	0	5	4	32	16	8.00	0
M Hendrick	1	1	9	9*		0	1	1	4	4*		0						
CP Marks	3	5	38	21	7.60	0	6	6	37	19	6.16	0						
DC Morgan	21	30	551	79	19.00	0	15	14	112	25	8.61	0	5	4	76	33	25.33	0
MH Page	19	28	1005	162	40.20	2	13	13	208	37	16.00	0	5	5	75	27*	18.75	0
HJ Rhodes	18	17	94	37*	15.66	0	12	4	11	6*	5.50	0	5	2	6	6	3.00	0
FE Rumsey							14	9	65	16*	10.83	0	5	2	9	8	4.50	0
PE Russell	9	9	98	31	24.50	0	3	3	55	30	18.33	0						
DHK Smith	21	34	766	61	24.70	0	13	13	315	62	26.25	0	5	5	139	49*	34.75	0
E Smith	23	25	286	42	12.43	0	2	2	29	21*	29.00	0						
FW Swarbrook	8	13	157	32	17.44	0	1	1	0	0	0.00	0						
RW Taylor	21	28	460	65	20.90	0	14	13	141	43*	17.62	0	5	4	39	25*	19.50	0
A Ward	15	11	139	44	17.37	0	10	8	54	21*	13.50	0	5	3	32	17	16.00	0

=== Competition bowling averages ===
Name	County Championship					John Player League					Gillette Cup				
Name	Balls	Runs	Wkts	Best	Ave	Balls	Runs	Wkts	Best	Ave	Balls	Runs	Wkts	Best	Ave
IR Buxton	1313	434	14	3-43	31.00	401	308	12	3-15	25.66	198	70	1	1-16	70.00
TJP Eyre	2515	1156	41	8-65	28.19	564	345	16	2-16	21.56	338	159	12	6-18	13.25
PJK Gibbs	120	89	1	1-45	89.00										
M Hendrick	102	27	1	1-27	27.00	48	16	0							
DC Morgan	1644	652	16	3-55	40.75	414	298	11	3-21	27.09	114	60	2	1-23	30.00
HJ Rhodes	2815	1088	59	6-17	18.44	540	328	17	3-11	19.29	318	119	9	4-18	13.22
FE Rumsey						564	263	12	2-0	21.91	310	118	11	3-19	10.72
PE Russell	974	417	15	4-15	27.80	66	43	3	2-29	14.33					
E Smith	3522	1459	49	5-73	29.77	30	23	0							
FW Swarbrook	978	441	14	4-38	31.50										
A Ward	2190	724	56	5-32	12.92	439	278	13	4-12	21.38	336	110	8	3-31	13.75

=== Wicket Keeping ===
Bob Taylor

County Championship Catches 49, Stumping 5
John Player League Catches 19, Stumping 2
Gillette Cup Catches 9, Stumping 0

== See also ==
- Derbyshire County Cricket Club seasons
- 1969 English cricket season
