= Derbyshire County Cricket Club in 1968 =

1968 season of an English cricket team

Derbyshire County Cricket Club seasons
1968 season
- Captain: Derek Morgan
- County Championship: 8
- Gillette Cup: Round 2
- Most runs: David Smith
- Most wickets: Harold Rhodes
- Most catches: Bob Taylor

Derbyshire County Cricket Club in 1968 represents the cricket season when the English club Derbyshire had been playing for ninety-seven years. In the County Championship, they won six matches to finish eighth in their sixty-fourth season in the Championship. They were eliminated in round 2 of the Gillette Cup.

== 1968 season ==
Derbyshire played 28 games in the County Championship, one match against Cambridge University, and one against the touring Australians. They won six first class matches altogether. Derek Morgan was in his fourth season as captain and was top scorer. Harold Rhodes took most wickets.

== Matches ==
=== First Class ===
List of matches
No.	Date	V	Result	Margin	Notes
1	1 May 1968	Middlesex; County Ground, Derby	Drawn		AB Jackson 6-30
2	8 May 1968	Cambridge University; FP Fenner's Ground, Cambridge	Drawn		Underwood 6-54; HJ Rhodes 5-39
3	11 May 1968	Kent; Bat and Ball Ground, Gravesend	Drawn		
4	15 May 1968	Surrey; Kennington Oval	Drawn		HJ Rhodes 6-25
5	19 May 1968	Warwickshire; Queen's Park, Chesterfield	Drawn		Cartwright 6-76
6	22 May 1968	Sussex; County Ground, Hove	Won	5 wickets	HJ Rhodes 5-99
7	29 May 1968	Sussex; Queen's Park, Chesterfield	Drawn		E Smith 5-31 and 6-89; Snow 5-34
8	01 Jun 1968	Northamptonshire; County Ground, Northampton	Drawn		Mohammad 100
9	05 Jun 1968	Worcestershire; Chester Road North Ground, Kidderminster	Won	21 runs	Holder 5-21; E Smith 5-37
10	08 Jun 1968	Northamptonshire; County Ground, Derby	Drawn		Milburn 100; TJP Eyre 5-57
11	12 Jun 1968	Lancashire; Queen's Park, Chesterfield	Drawn		
12	15 Jun 1968	Nottinghamshire; Trent Bridge, Nottingham	Lost	3 wickets	
13	19 Jun 1968	Worcestershire; County Ground, Derby	Won	Innings and 110 runs	IR Buxton 5-8 and 6-25
14	22 Jun 1968	Warwickshire; Edgbaston, Birmingham	Drawn		
15	29 Jun 1968	Gloucestershire; Queen's Park, Chesterfield	Won	9 wickets	MH Page 100; HJ Rhodes 5-42; Procter 6-43; E Smith 6-57
16	06 Jul 1968	Essex; Castle Park Cricket Ground, Colchester	Drawn		DHK Smith 99
17	10 Jul 1968	Somerset; Recreation Ground, Bath	Abandoned		
18	17 Jul 1968	Lancashire; Trafalgar Road Ground, Southport	Lost	124 runs	Higgs 6-39 and 5-17; E Smith 5-100; Hughes 5-46
19	20 Jul 1968	Nottinghamshire; Rutland Recreation Ground, Ilkeston	Lost	6 wickets	White 5-41
20	24 Jul 1968	Surrey; Rutland Recreation Ground, Ilkeston	Lost	3 wickets	Harman 6-97 and 8-16; E Smith 5-70
21	27 Jul 1968	Leicestershire; Grace Road, Leicester	Drawn		DHK Smith 117; Marner 108; E Smith 5-70
22	31 Jul 1968	Australian cricket team in England in 1968; Queen's Park, Chesterfield	Lost	8 runs	DC Morgan 5-83; Mallett 5-69
23	03 Aug 1968	Leicestershire; Ind Coope Ground, Burton-on-Trent	Drawn		Inman 108; PE Russell 5-50
24	10 Aug 1968	Somerset; Park Road Ground, Buxton	Won	2 wickets	MH Page 117; DC Morgan 103
25	14 Aug 1968	Glamorgan; County Ground, Derby	Drawn		
26	17 Aug 1968	Yorkshire; Park Avenue Cricket Ground, Bradford	Drawn		TJP Eyre 5-31; B Lewis 5-57
27	21 Aug 1968	Middlesex; Lord's Cricket Ground, St John's Wood	Lost	6 wickets	Parfitt 131; Titmus 5-41
28	24 Aug 1968	Yorkshire; Queen's Park, Chesterfield	Drawn		Hampshire 100; Nicholson 5-40
29	28 Aug 1968	Glamorgan; Sophia Gardens, Cardiff	Won	100 runs	A Ward 6-56
30	31 Aug 1968	Hampshire; County Ground, Derby	Drawn		A Ward 5-50

=== Gillette Cup ===
List of matches
No.	Date	V	Result	Margin	Notes
1st Round	25 May 1968	Sussex; County Ground, Hove	Lost	10 wickets	

== Statistics ==
=== Competition batting averages ===
Name	County Championship						Gillette Cup					
Name	M	I	Runs	HS	Ave	100	M	I	Runs	HS	Ave	100
IR Buxton	25	41	992	87	26.10	0	1	1	5	5	5.00	0
JR Eyre							1	1	18	18	18.00	0
TJP Eyre	26	35	598	89	22.14	0						
PJK Gibbs	27	48	1259	90	27.36	0	1	1	3	3	3.00	0
IW Hall	4	6	144	68	24.00	0						
JF Harvey	27	42	1006	74*	30.48	0	1	1	3	3	3.00	0
AB Jackson	19	13	37	10	6.16	0	1	1	3	3*		0
CP Marks	6	8	123	39	15.37	0						
DC Morgan	21	34	955	103*	39.79	1	1	1	2	2	2.00	0
MH Page	24	44	1195	117	30.64	2	1	1	3	3	3.00	0
HJ Rhodes	26	25	125	23	8.92	0	1	1	15	15	15.00	0
PE Russell	8	7	41	17*	6.83	0						
DHK Smith	27	48	1347	117	29.93	1	1	1	32	32	32.00	0
E Smith	25	29	401	41*	18.22	0						
GR Stephenson	2	4	41	19	10.25	0						
FW Swarbrook	1	1	4	4*		0						
RW Taylor	25	30	334	52	14.52	0	1	1	1	1	1.00	0
A Ward	4	3	1	1*		0	1	1	0	0	0.00	0

=== Competition bowling averages ===
Name	County Championship					Gillette Cup				
Name	Balls	Runs	Wkts	Best	Ave	Balls	Runs	Wkts	Best	Ave
IR Buxton	2023	626	33	6-25	18.96 2	53	27	0		
JR Eyre						42	15	0		
TJP Eyre	2969	1438	45	5-31	31.95 2					
PJK Gibbs	149	77	2	2-54	38.50					
JF Harvey	36	17	0							
AB Jackson	2738	987	46	4-27	21.45	18	3	0		
DC Morgan	2001	694	27	4-33	25.70	59	20	0		
HJ Rhodes	4308	1564	93	6-25	16.81 4	72	24	0		
PE Russell	1272	489	16	5-50	30.56 1					
E Smith	5136	1899	80	6-57	23.73 7					
FW Swarbrook	180	54	4	2-10	13.50					
A Ward	701	308	26	6-56	11.84 2	7	1	0		

=== Wicket Keeping ===
Bob Taylor

County Championship Catches 50, Stumping 7
Gillette Cup Catches 0, Stumping 0

== See also ==
- Derbyshire County Cricket Club seasons
- 1968 English cricket season
