= Derbyshire County Cricket Club in 1965 =

1965 season of an English cricket team

Derbyshire County Cricket Club seasons
1965 season
- Captain: Derek Morgan
- County Championship: 9
- Gillette Cup: 2nd Round
- Most runs: Ian Hall
- Most wickets: Brian Jackson
- Most catches: Bob Taylor

Derbyshire County Cricket Club in 1965 was the cricket season when the English club Derbyshire had been playing for ninety-four years. It was their sixty-first season in the County Championship and they won seven championship matches and lost nine to finish ninth in the County Championship. It was the third season in which the Gillette Cup was played, and Derbyshire reached the second round.

== 1965 season ==
Derbyshire played 28 games in the County Championship, one match against the touring South Africans and one match against Oxford University. They won nine first class matches, lost nine matches and drew twelve matches. They won their first round match in the Gillette Cup, but lost in the second round. Derek Morgan was captain. Ian Hall scored most runs. Brian Jackson took most wickets for the club.

Philip Russell and David Smith were both promoted from the second XI for games at the end of the season. Russell played steadily for the club for many years. Smith became a high scorer for the club over four later seasons.

== Matches ==
=== First Class ===
List of matches
No.	Date	V	Result	Margin	Notes
1	5 May 1965	Northamptonshire; County Ground, Derby	Drawn		
2	8 May 1965	Gloucestershire; Ashley Down Ground, Bristol	Lost	3 wickets	
3	12 May 1965	Glamorgan; Queen's Park, Chesterfield	Won	3 wickets	DC Morgan 7–33; AB Jackson 5–33
4	15 May 1965	Warwickshire; Edgbaston, Birmingham	Drawn		HJ Rhodes 7–38
5	19 May 1965	Oxford University; The University Parks, Oxford	Won	5 wickets	E Smith 5–23; Martin 5–39; MHJ Allen 5–19
6	26 May 1965	Kent; County Ground, Derby	Lost	106 runs	Brown 6–27 and 6–41; GW Richardson 5–47
7	29 May 1965	Yorkshire; Queen's Park, Chesterfield	Drawn		
8	5 Jun 1965	Worcestershire; County Ground, New Road, Worcester	Lost	8 Wickets	Flavell 6–31
9	9 Jun 1965	Middlesex; Queen's Park, Chesterfield	Won	5 wickets	HJ Rhodes 6–24; AB Jackson 5–32
10	12 Jun 1965	Leicestershire; County Ground, Derby	Drawn		
11	16 Jun 1965	Leicestershire; Brush Ground, Loughborough	Won	66 runs	HJ Rhodes 6–9; Lock 5–8
12	19 Jun 1965	Lancashire; Park Road Ground, Buxton	Drawn		AB Jackson 5–26 and 5–33; Statham 6–16
13	26 Jun 1965	South Africans; Queen's Park, Chesterfield	Won	7 wickets	
14	3 Jul 1965	Kent; Cheriton Road Sports Ground, Folkestone	Drawn		IW Hall 101 and 101; Denness 174
15	7 Jul 1965	Essex; Castle Park Cricket Ground, Colchester	Drawn		AB Jackson 7–32
16	10 Jul 1965	Kent; County Ground, Derby	Drawn		HJ Rhodes 5–57
17	17 Jul 1965	Nottinghamshire; Rutland Recreation Ground, Ilkeston	Won	6 wickets	Corran 6–67; HJ Rhodes 6–21
18	21 Jul 1965	Lancashire; Trafalgar Road Ground, Southport	Lost	Innings and 14 runs	HJ Rhodes 5–75; Statham 5–27
19	24 Jul 1965	Northamptonshire; County Ground, Northampton	Lost	2 wickets	HJ Rhodes 5–42; Steele 6–40
20	28 Jul 1965	Essex; County Ground, Derby	Lost	85 runs	G Smith 5–39; Edmeades 7–43
21	31 Jul 1965	Worcestershire; Queen's Park, Chesterfield	Lost	Innings and 31 runs	AB Jackson 5–71; Gifford 7–23
22	4 Aug 1965	Gloucestershire; Ind Coope Ground, Burton-on-Trent	Won	47 runs	AB Jackson 5–33; AS Brown 7–34
23	7 Aug 1965	Sussex; County Ground, Hove	Drawn		Bates 6–18
24	11 Aug 1965	Kent; United Services Recreation Ground, Portsmouth	Drawn		Shackleton 5–31
25	14 Aug 1965	Nottinghamshire; Trent Bridge, Nottingham	Won	8 wickets	Smedley 107
26	18 Aug 1965	Surrey; Queen's Park, Chesterfield	Lost	Innings and 5 runs	Gibson 5–42; AB Jackson 6–76; Arnold 7–25
27	21 Aug 1965	Somerset; Morlands Athletic Ground, Glastonbury	Drawn		
28	25 Aug 1965	Glamorgan; Cardiff Arms Park	Won	91 runs	Shepherd 6–39; HJ Rhodes 6–30
29	28 Aug 1965	Warwickshire; County Ground, Derby	Lost	19 runs	AB Jackson 5–48; Cartwright 7–48; Bannister 5–39
30	1 Sep 1965	Yorkshire; North Marine Road Ground, Scarborough	Drawn		Trueman 5–23

=== Gillette Cup ===
List of matches
No.	Date	V	Result	Margin	Notes
1st round	28 Apr 1965	Essex; Old County Ground, Brentwood	Won	95 runs	Knight 5–41
2nd round	22 May 1965	Middlesex; Lord's Cricket Ground, St John's Wood	Lost	10 runs	

== Statistics ==
=== Competition batting averages ===
Name	County Championship						Gillette Cup					
Name	M	I	Runs	HS	Ave	100	M	I	Runs	HS	Ave	100
IW Hall	24	46	1174	101	26.68	2	2	2	19	14	9.50	0
DC Morgan	27	47	749	86	20.80	0	2	2	15	15	7.50	0
HL Johnson	26	47	933	82	20.73	0	1	1	1	1	1.00	0
IR Buxton	24	44	704	85	17.60	0	2	2	95	61	47.50	0
JF Harvey	15	24	328	57	14.26	0	2	2	1	1	0.50	0
MH Page	26	49	610	57	14.18	0	2	2	86	83	43.00	0
WF Oates	14	26	348	36	13.92	0	2	2	23	14	11.50	0
RW Taylor	28	46	535	48	13.37	0	2	2	54	53*	54.00	0
TJP Eyre	11	18	190	36*	12.66	0						
JR Eyre	15	28	325	53	12.03	0						
E Smith	28	44	421	33	10.26	0	1	1	5	5	5.00	0
HJ Rhodes	23	32	157	27*	8.26	0	2	2	26	26*		0
AB Jackson	27	33	140	27	7.00	0	2	0				
DHK Smith	4	7	43	15	6.14	0						
MHJ Allen	10	13	51	20*	4.63	0	1	1	4	4*		0
GW Richardson	5	8	20	7	2.85	0	1	1	2	2	2.00	0
PE Russell	1	1	1	1	1.00	0						

Leading first-class batsmen for Derbyshire by runs scored
Name	Mat	Inns	Runs	HS	Ave	100
IW Hall	26	50	1363	101	26.29	2
HL Johnson	28	51	1026	82	21.37	0
DC Morgan	29	50	796	86	20.94	0
IR Buxton	26	48	748	85	17.39	0
MH Page	27	51	649	57	14.42	0

Leading ListA batsmen for Derbyshire by runs scored
Name	Mat	Inns	Runs	HS	Ave	100
IR Buxton	2	2	95	61	47.50	0
MH Page	2	2	86	83	43.00	0
RW Taylor	2	2	54	53*	54.00	0
HJ Rhodes	2	2	26	26*		0
WF Oates	2	2	23	14	11.50	0

=== Competition bowling averages ===
Name	County Championship					Gillette Cup				
Name	Balls	Runs	Wkts	Best	Ave	Balls	Runs	Wkts	Best	Ave
HJ Rhodes	3779	1276	115	7–38	11.09	144	49	5	3–16	9.80
AB Jackson	4625	1424	115	7–32	12.38	138	36	2	2–19	18.00
E Smith	3656	1259	60	4–63	20.98					
IR Buxton	2498	801	43	4–35	18.62	98	34	5	3–15	6.80
DC Morgan	2828	969	40	7–33	24.22	90	51	4	2–15	12.75
MHJ Allen	1044	471	15	4–81	31.40	54	34	1	1–34	34.00
GW Richardson	504	202	11	5–57	18.36	69	40	2	2–40	20.00
PE Russell	60	25	2	2–10	12.50					
TJP Eyre	162	47	2	1–6	23.50					
MH Page	36	22	1	1–20	22.00					
HL Johnson	66	34	1	1–24	34.00					
WF Oates	78	62	0							
JR Eyre	12	7	0							

Leading first class bowlers for Derbyshire by wickets taken
Name	Balls	Runs	Wkts	BBI	Ave
AB Jackson	4847	1491	120	7–32	12.42
HJ Rhodes	3878	1314	119	7–38	11.04 8
E Smith	4203	1412	71	5–23	19.88
IR Buxton	2738	849	47	4–35	18.06
DC Morgan	3014	1021	42	7–33	24.30

Leading ListA bowlers for Derbyshire by wickets taken
Name	Balls	Runs	Wkts	BBI	Ave
IR Buxton	98	34	5	3–15	6.80
HJ Rhodes	144	49	5	3–16	9.80
DC Morgan	90	51	4	2–15	12.75
AB Jackson	138	36	2	2–19	18.00
GW Richardson	69	40	2	2–40	20.00

=== Wicket Keeping ===
- Bob Taylor

County Championship Catches 76, Stumping 6
Gillette Cup Catches, Stumping

== See also ==
- Derbyshire County Cricket Club seasons
- 1965 English cricket season
