= Derbyshire County Cricket Club in 1966 =

1966 season of an English cricket team

Derbyshire County Cricket Club seasons
1966 season
- Captain: Derek Morgan
- County Championship: 9
- Gillette Cup: Round 2
- Most runs: John Harvey
- Most wickets: Harold Rhodes
- Most catches: Bob Taylor

Derbyshire County Cricket Club in 1966 represents the cricket season when the English club Derbyshire had been playing for ninety-five years. In the County Championship, they won eight matches to finish ninth in their sixty-second season in the Championship. They were eliminated in round 2 of the Gillette Cup.

== 1966 season ==
Derbyshire played 28 games in the County Championship, one match against Oxford University, and one against the touring West Indians. They won nine first class matches altogether. Derek Morgan was in his second season as captain. John Harvey was top scorer and Harold Rhodes took most wickets.

Peter Gibbs joined the side from Oxford University, and Maurice Hill joined from Nottinghamshire. Alan Ward made his debut with Derbyshire during the season. All three saw further years service with Derbyshire.

== Matches ==
=== First Class ===
List of matches
| No. | Date | V | Result | Margin | Notes |
|---|---|---|---|---|---|
| 1 | 4 May 1966 | Northamptonshire; County Ground, Derby | Drawn | | Milburn 130 |
| 2 | 7 May 1966 | Surrey; Kennington Oval | Won | 7 runs | E Smith 6-26 |
| 3 | 11 May 1966 | Leicestershire; Grace Road, Leicester | Drawn | | Lock 7-31 and 5-40 |
| 4 | 14 May 1966 | Hampshire; Queen's Park, Chesterfield | Drawn | | Cottam 5-28; E Smith 7-59 and 6-60 |
| 5 | 18 May 1966 | Northamptonshire; County Ground, Northampton | Won | 22 runs | DC Morgan 6-36 and 5-24; Sully 5-22 |
| 6 | 25 May 1966 | Essex; Rutland Recreation Ground, Ilkeston | Drawn | | Knight 5-25 |
| 7 | 28 May 1966 | West Indies; County Ground, Derby | Lost | Innings and 32 runs | McMorris 157; Gary Sobers 6-11 |
| 8 | 1 Jun 1966 | Sussex; Queen's Park, Chesterfield | Drawn | | Snow 5-33 |
| 9 | 4 Jun 1966 | Gloucestershire; Ashley Down Ground, Bristol | Lost | 9 runs | Brown 5-42; DC Morgan 6-55 |
| 10 | 8 Jun 1966 | Kent; County Ground, Derby | Won | 80 runs | HJ Rhodes 5-31 |
| 11 | 11 Jun 1966 | Yorkshire; Queen's Park, Chesterfield | Lost | Innings and 15 runs | |
| 12 | 18 Jun 1966 | Kent; County Ground, Derby | Lost | 7 wickets | |
| 13 | 25 Jun 1966 | Yorkshire; Bramall Lane, Sheffield | Lost | 10 wickets | Nicholson 5-12 |
| 14 | 29 Jun 1966 | Warwickshire; Park Road Ground, Buxton | Won | 8 wickets | E Smith 5-23 |
| 15 | 2 Jul 1966 | Lancashire; Old Trafford, Manchester | Won | 30 runs | Knox 100;E Smith 6-21 |
| 16 | 6 Jul 1966 | Oxford University; County Ground, Derby | Won | 5 wickets | IW Hall 102; IR Buxton 5-16 |
| 17 | 9 Jul 1966 | Nottinghamshire; Trent Bridge, Nottingham | Won | 8 wickets | JF Harvey 103* |
| 18 | 13 Jul 1966 | Middlesex; Lord's Cricket Ground, St John's Wood | Drawn | | Russell 101; Harris 114; Price 8-48 |
| 19 | 16 Jul 1966 | Leicestershire; Queen's Park, Chesterfield | Lost | 120 runs | Lock 7-50 |
| 20 | 20 Jul 1966 | Essex; Garrison A Cricket Ground, Colchester | Drawn | | |
| 21 | 23 Jul 1966 | Somerset; Ind Coope Ground, Burton-on-Trent | Lost | 10 wickets | Palmer 7-59 |
| 22 | 27 Jul 1966 | Lancashire; Queen's Park, Chesterfield | Lost | 7 wickets | Sratham 5-44 |
| 23 | 30 Jul 1966 | Hampshire; County Ground, Southampton | Drawn | | Castell 6-49; HJ Rhodes 5-28; White 6-37 |
| 24 | 3 Aug 1966 | Gloucestershire; County Ground, Derby | Lost | 60 runs | Allen 5-25 |
| 25 | 6 Aug 1966 | Worcestershire; Rutland Recreation Ground, Ilkeston | Lost | 3 runs | E Smith 5-74; Gifford 8-54 |
| 26 | 13 Aug 1966 | Worcestershire; Chester Road North Ground, Kidderminster | Lost | 7 wickets | Fearnley 112; Gifford 6-91 and 6-55; E Smith 5-102 |
| 27 | 17 Aug 1966 | Warwickshire; Courtaulds Ground, Coventry | Won | 10 wickets | AB Jackson 8-18 |
| 28 | 20 Aug 1966 | Glamorgan; County Ground, Derby | Lost | 78 runs | AB Jackson 5-68 |
| 29 | 24 Aug 1966 | Nottinghamshire; Queen's Park, Chesterfield | Won | 159 runs | |
| 30 | 27 Aug 1966 | Glamorgan; Penrhyn Avenue, Rhos-on-Sea, Colwyn Bay | Lost | 63 runs | DC Morgan 7-47; Wheatley 6-42 |

=== Gillette Cup ===
List of matches
| No. | Date | V | Result | Margin | Notes |
|---|---|---|---|---|---|
| 1st Round | 21 May 1966 | Essex; Queen's Park, Chesterfield | Lost | 2 wickets | |

== Statistics ==
=== Competition batting averages ===
| Name | County Championship | | | | | | Gillette Cup | | | | | |
| Name | M | I | Runs | HS | Ave | 100 | M | I | Runs | HS | Ave | 100 |
|---|---|---|---|---|---|---|---|---|---|---|---|---|
| MHJ Allen | 5 | 8 | 50 | 17* | 10.00 | 0 | 1 | 1 | 0 | 0 | 0.00 | 0 |
| IR Buxton | 20 | 34 | 507 | 68 | 17.48 | 0 | 1 | 1 | 12 | 12 | 12.00 | 0 |
| JR Eyre | 18 | 35 | 527 | 61 | 15.96 | 0 | 1 | 1 | 38 | 38 | 38.00 | 0 |
| TJP Eyre | 18 | 31 | 553 | 88 | 20.48 | 0 | 1 | 1 | 4 | 4 | 4.00 | 0 |
| PJK Gibbs | 5 | 10 | 154 | 43 | 15.40 | 0 | | | | | | |
| IW Hall | 19 | 37 | 791 | 74 | 21.97 | 0 | | | | | | |
| JF Harvey | 26 | 48 | 1060 | 103* | 23.04 | 1 | 1 | 1 | 29 | 29 | 29.00 | 0 |
| M Hill | 23 | 41 | 810 | 61 | 21.31 | 0 | 1 | 1 | 17 | 17 | 17.00 | 0 |
| AB Jackson | 21 | 26 | 118 | 25* | 9.07 | 0 | | | | | | |
| HL Johnson | 20 | 38 | 642 | 73 | 18.34 | 0 | 1 | 1 | 25 | 25 | 25.00 | 0 |
| DC Morgan | 28 | 48 | 962 | 96 | 23.46 | 0 | 1 | 1 | 42 | 42 | 42.00 | 0 |
| MH Page | 21 | 39 | 583 | 42 | 17.14 | 0 | | | | | | |
| HJ Rhodes | 22 | 31 | 156 | 28 | 10.40 | 0 | 1 | 1 | 9 | 9* | 0 | 0 |
| PE Russell | 7 | 13 | 219 | 56 | 16.84 | 0 | | | | | | |
| DHK Smith | 1 | 2 | 15 | 15 | 7.50 | 0 | | | | | | |
| E Smith | 25 | 37 | 211 | 22 | 6.02 | 0 | | | | | | |
| RW Taylor | 28 | 44 | 682 | 42 | 17.48 | 0 | 1 | 1 | 17 | 17 | 17.00 | 0 |
| A Ward | 1 | 1 | 3 | 3 | 3.00 | 0 | 1 | 1 | 3 | 3 | 3.00 | 0 |

=== Competition bowling averages ===
| Name | County Championship | | | | | Gillette Cup | | | | |
| Name | Balls | Runs | Wkts | Best | Ave | Balls | Runs | Wkts | Best | Ave |
|---|---|---|---|---|---|---|---|---|---|---|
| MHJ Allen | 419 | 156 | 0 | | | 40 | 29 | 0 | | |
| IR Buxton | 1880 | 696 | 21 | 3-27 | 33.14 | 72 | 35 | 1 | 1-35 | 35.00 |
| JR Eyre | 84 | 32 | 1 | 1-6 | 32.00 | 6 | 5 | 0 | | |
| TJP Eyre | 1542 | 790 | 31 | 4-39 | 25.48 | 12 | 16 | 0 | | |
| IW Hall | 2 | 4 | 0 | | | | | | | |
| AB Jackson | 3637 | 1189 | 64 | 8-18 | 18.57 | | | | | |
| HL Johnson | 24 | 15 | 0 | | | | | | | |
| DC Morgan | 4982 | 1695 | 84 | 7-47 | 20.17 | 72 | 42 | 0 | | |
| MH Page | 234 | 140 | 0 | | | | | | | |
| HJ Rhodes | 3858 | 1417 | 78 | 5-28 | 18.16 | 72 | 17 | 1 | 1-17 | 17.00 |
| PE Russell | 678 | 254 | 7 | 2-23 | 36.28 | | | | | |
| E Smith | 4821 | 1605 | 87 | 7-59 | 18.44 | | | | | |
| RW Taylor | 6 | 0 | 0 | | | | | | | |
| A Ward | 36 | 13 | 1 | 1-13 | 13.00 | 72 | 36 | 3 | 3-36 | 12.00 |

=== Wicket Keeping ===
Bob Taylor

County Championship Catches 58, Stumping 2
Gillette Cup Catches 0, Stumping 0

== See also ==
- Derbyshire County Cricket Club seasons
- 1966 English cricket season
