= Derbyshire County Cricket Club in 1964 =

1964 season of an English cricket team

Derbyshire County Cricket Club seasons
1964 season
- Captain: Charles Lee
- County Championship: 12
- Gillette Cup: Round 1
- Most runs: Derek Morgan
- Most wickets: Brian Jackson
- Most catches: Bob Taylor

Derbyshire County Cricket Club in 1964 was the cricket season when the English club Derbyshire had been playing for ninety three years. It was their sixtieth season in the County Championship and they won five matches to finish twelfth in the County Championship. In the second year of the Gillette Cup they were eliminated in round 1.

== 1964 season ==
Derbyshire played 28 games in the County Championship, one match against Oxford University, and one against the touring Australians. They won five first class matches altogether and lost in the initial round of the Gillette Cup. Charles Lee was in his second season as captain. Derek Morgan was top scorer and Brian Jackson took most wickets.

Players who made their debut for Derbyshire were Michael Page who went on to play a further eleven seasons for the club, and Michael Allen who joined the club from Northamptonshire and played for three seasons.

== Matches ==
=== First Class ===
List of matches
No.	Date	V	Result	Margin	Notes
1	6 May 1964	Glamorgan; Stradey Park, Llanelli	Drawn		
2	9 May 1964	Sussex; Queen's Park, Chesterfield	Drawn		Suttle 121; IW Hall 103
3	13 May 1964	Hampshire; Dean Park, Bournemouth	Drawn		DC Morgan 147; Marshall 106
4	16 May 1964	Northamptonshire; County Ground, Derby	Drawn		
5	20 May 1964	Kent; Queen's Park, Chesterfield	Lost	Innings and 21 runs	IR Buxton 100; Sayer 7-54
6	23 May 1964	Yorkshire; Bramall Lane, Sheffield	Drawn		IW Hall 98; AB Jackson 5-50
7	30 May 1964	Glamorgan; County Ground, Derby	Drawn		
8	3 Jun 1964	Worcestershire; Queen's Park, Chesterfield	Lost	1 wicket	Standen 5-64; DC Morgan 5-48
9	6 Jun 1964	Leicestershire; Bath Grounds, Ashby-de-la-Zouch	Drawn		
10	10 Jun 1964	Australians; County Ground, Derby	Drawn		HL Johnson 101*
11	13 Jun 1964	Middlesex; Ind Coope Ground, Burton-on-Trent	Lost	107 runs	Parfitt 143; Titmus 5-43
12	17 Jun 1964	Oxford University; The University Parks, Oxford	Drawn		WF Oates 6-47; Martin 7-26
13	20 Jun 1964	Lancashire; Old Trafford, Manchester	Won	10 wickets	Ramadhin 6-56
14	27 Jun 1964	Lancashire; County Ground, Derby	Drawn		IR Buxton 118
15	1 Jul 1964	Sussex; County Ground, Hove	Drawn		AB Jackson 5-42
16	4 Jul 1964	Worcestershire; County Ground, New Road, Worcester	Lost	42 runs	DC Morgan 5-41; Coldwell 5-31
17	8 Jul 1964	Surrey; Kennington Oval	Lost	170 runs	Willett 106; Harman 5-9
18	11 Jul 1964	Yorkshire; Queen's Park, Chesterfield	Drawn		Padgett 112
19	15 Jul 1964	Warwickshire; County Ground, Derby	Lost	4 wickets	HL Johnson 101; DC Morgan 103; Mence 5-26; Cartwright 5-23
20	18 Jul 1964	Nottinghamshire; Rutland Recreation Ground, Ilkeston	Won	162 runs	HL Johnson 137; Forbes 7-80; E Smith 6-25
21	25 Jul 1964	Gloucestershire; Recreational Trust Ground, Lydney	Drawn		Nicholls 132; Brown 5-82
22	29 Jul 1964	Leicestershire; Queen's Park, Chesterfield	Won	Innings and 95 runs	MH Page 112; TJP Eyre 5-15
23	1 Aug 1964	Northamptonshire; County Ground, Northampton	Lost	37 runs	Scott 6-39
24	8 Aug 1964	Nottinghamshire; Trent Bridge, Nottingham	Drawn		Goonesena 5-50; MHJ Allen 5-28
25	15 Aug 1964	Warwickshire; Edgbaston, Birmingham	Won	46 runs	HJ Rhodes 5-48; DC Morgan 5-53
26	19 Aug 1964	Essex; County Ground, Derby	Lost	8 wickets	Barker 121
27	22 Aug 1964	Somerset; County Ground, Taunton	Won	64 runs	JF Harvey 114; MHJ Allen 7-65
28	26 Aug 1964	Surrey; Park Road Ground, Buxton	Drawn		Jefferson 100*; Arnold 6-56; Storey 5-58
29	29 Aug 1964	Somerset; Queen's Park, Chesterfield	Drawn		Alley 140; HL Johnson 132; DC Morgan 115; Palmer 5-58
30	2 Sep 1964	Middlesex; Lord's Cricket Ground, St John's Wood	Lost	86 runs	Parfitt 113; HL Johnson 100; Titmus 7-73

=== Gillette Cup ===
List of matches
No.	Date	V	Result	Margin	Notes
1st Round	2 May 1964	Northamptonshire; County Ground, Derby	Lost	35 runs	

== Statistics ==
=== Competition batting averages ===
Name	County Championship						Gillette Cup					
Name	M	I	Runs	HS	Ave	100	M	I	Runs	HS	Ave	100
MHJ Allen	14	17	122	38*	11.09	0						
IR Buxton	24	43	1165	118*	29.12	2	1	1	0	0	0.00	0
JR Eyre	1	2	35	34*	35.00	0						
TJP Eyre	14	22	351	54	17.55	0						
IW Hall	22	39	1055	103*	31.02	1	1	1	7	7	7.00	0
JF Harvey	22	41	723	114	18.53	1	1	1	4	4	4.00	0
AB Jackson	27	27	124	27	9.53	0	1	1	0	0	0.00	0
HL Johnson	28	49	1348	137	30.63	4	1	1	10	10	10.00	0
C Lee	19	29	527	67	18.17	0	1	1	42	42	42.00	0
D Millner							1	1	4	4	4.00	0
DC Morgan	28	47	1590	147	38.78	3	1	1	27	27	27.00	0
WF Oates	20	34	635	81	21.89	0	1	1	12	12	12.00	0
MH Page	21	38	907	112	26.67	1						
HJ Rhodes	19	23	117	29*	7.80	0	1	1	10	10*		0
GW Richardson							1	1	3	3	3.00	0
E Smith	28	43	701	58*	17.97	0						
RW Taylor	21	33	359	57*	16.31	0						

=== Competition bowling averages ===
Name	County Championship					Gillette Cup				
Name	Balls	Runs	Wkts	Best	Ave	Balls	Runs	Wkts	Best	Ave
MHJ Allen	1443	705	28	7-65	25.17					
IR Buxton	2526	936	31	4-44	30.19	48	19	0		
TJP Eyre	1967	850	28	5-15	30.35					
AB Jackson	4814	1864	79	5-42	23.59	78	22	1	1-22	22.00
HL Johnson	96	82	5	3-12	16.40					
DC Morgan	4822	2027	77	5-41	26.32	78	31	3	3-31	10.33
WF Oates	186	103	3	1-2	34.33					
MH Page	60	30	0							
HJ Rhodes	3412	1326	44	5-48	30.13	78	35	2	2-35	17.50
GW Richardson						70	49	4	4-49	12.25
E Smith	3894	1521	53	6-25	28.69					

== Wicket Keepers ==
Bob Taylor

County Championship Catches 55, Stumping 5

Laurie Johnson

County Championship Catches 36, Stumping 2

== See also ==
- Derbyshire County Cricket Club seasons
- 1964 English cricket season
