= Derbyshire County Cricket Club in 1967 =

1967 season of an English cricket team

Derbyshire County Cricket Club seasons
1967 season
- Captain: Derek Morgan
- County Championship: 6
- Gillette Cup: Round 2
- Most runs: David Smith
- Most wickets: Harold Rhodes
- Most catches: Bob Taylor

Derbyshire County Cricket Club in 1967 was the cricket season when the English club Derbyshire had been playing for ninety-six years. It was their sixty-third season in the County Championship and they won five championship matches and lost five to finish sixth in the County Championship. In the Gillette Cup, Derbyshire were knocked out in their first match which was in the second round of the competition.

== 1967 season ==
Derbyshire played 28 games in the County Championship, one match against the touring Indians and one match against Cambridge University. They won six first class matches, lost six matches and drew eighteen matches. They lost their only match in the Gillette Cup. Derek Morgan was captain. David Smith scored most runs. Harold Rhodes took most wickets for the club.

There were two new players in the Derbyshire team. GR Stephenson played for two years before moving to Hampshire and CP Marks occasional matches over two years.

== Matches ==
=== First Class ===
List of matches
No.	Date	V	Result	Margin	Notes
1	29 Apr 1967	Leicestershire; County Ground, Derby	Won	9 wickets	
2	6 May 1967	Middlesex; Lord's Cricket Ground, St John's Wood	Lost	9 wickets	Hooker 5-51
3	17 May 1967	Hampshire; County Ground, Southampton	Drawn		Shackleton 5-52
4	20 May 1967	Surrey; Queen's Park, Chesterfield	Drawn		
5	24 May 1967	Sussex; County Ground, Derby	Drawn		
6	27 May 1967	Nottinghamshire; Trent Bridge, Nottingham	Drawn		Smedley 102
7	31 May 1967	Glamorgan; Queen's Park, Chesterfield	Drawn		HJ Rhodes 6-28
8	3 Jun 1967	Somerset; Recreation Ground, Bath	Won	9 wickets	Langford 5-54; E Smith 5-57
9	7 Jun 1967	Worcestershire; County Ground, Derby	Drawn		Flavell 5-31
10	10 Jun 1967	Lancashire; Old Trafford, Manchester	Drawn		JR Eyre 106
11	17 Jun 1967	Lancashire; Park Road Ground, Buxton	Drawn		AB Jackson 5-39
12	21 Jun 1967	Somerset; Queen's Park, Chesterfield	Drawn		MH Page 99; Langford 5-45
13	24 Jun 1967	Warwickshire; Edgbaston, Birmingham	Lost	59 runs	HJ Rhodes 5-27; Bannister 7-52; AB Jackson 7-22; Cartwright 5-7
14	28 Jun 1967	India; County Ground, Derby	Lost	66 runs	Chandrasekhar 7-59; Prasanna 6-64
15	1 Jul 1967	Cambridge University; Rutland Recreation Ground, Ilkeston	Won	9 wickets	DHK Smith 103
16	5 Jul 1967	Sussex; County Ground, Hove	Lost	10 wickets	Buss 7-63; Parks 107
17	8 Jul 1967	Yorkshire; Queen's Park, Chesterfield	Drawn		HJ Rhodes 5-57
18	12 Jul 1967	Gloucestershire; Wagon Works Ground, Gloucester	Lost	93 runs	DC Morgan 5-36; Mortimore 6-35
19	15 Jul 1967	Worcestershire; County Ground, New Road, Worcester	Drawn		Coldwell 5-36
20	22 Jul 1967	Nottinghamshire; Rutland Recreation Ground, Ilkeston	Drawn		IR Buxton 105;
21	26 Jul 1967	Essex; Queen's Park, Chesterfield	Won	Innings and 227 runs	DHK Smith 114; DC Morgan 6-26 and 5-41
22	29 Jul 1967	Glamorgan; Sophia Gardens, Cardiff	Won	Innings and 3 runs	DC Morgan 6-17 and 5-38
23	2 Aug 1967	Leicestershire; Grace Road, Leicester	Lost	5 wickets	Lock 6-57
24	5 Aug 1967	Middlesex; County Ground, Derby	Drawn		
25	9 Aug 1967	Surrey; Kennington Oval	Drawn		Pocock 5-73
26	12 Aug 1967	Yorkshire; Park Avenue Cricket Ground, Bradford	Drawn		Nicholson 5-24
27	16 Aug 1967	Kent; Ind Coope Ground, Burton-on-Trent	Drawn		Shepherd 6-71
28	19 Aug 1967	Warwickshire; Queen's Park, Chesterfield	Drawn		PJK Gibbs 124; Ibadulla 7-22; TJP Eyre 5-42
29	23 Aug 1967	Northamptonshire; County Ground, Northampton	Won	4 runs	
30	26 Aug 1967	Northamptonshire; County Ground, Derby	Drawn		Prideaux 102; PJK Gibbs 106; Kettle 5-69

=== Gillette Cup ===
List of matches
No.	Date	V	Result	Margin	Notes
2nd Round	13 May 1967	Surrey; Kennington Oval	Lost	184 runs	Arnold 5-9; Roope 5-23

== Statistics ==
=== Competition batting averages ===
Name	County Championship						Gillette Cup					
Name	M	I	Runs	HS	Ave	100	M	I	Runs	HS	Ave	100
IR Buxton	25	38	992	105	32.00	1	1	1	0	0	0.00	0
JR Eyre	8	11	198	106	18.00	1						
TJP Eyre	27	34	521	56	16.28	0	1	1	27	27	27.00	0
PJK Gibbs	21	37	916	124	26.94	2	1	1	3	3	3.00	0
IW Hall	10	17	319	64	21.26	0						
JF Harvey	18	32	537	47	18.51	0	1	1	2	2	2.00	0
M Hill	7	8	83	23	11.85	0	1	1	1	1	1.00	0
AB Jackson	24	24	62	9	7.75	0	1	1	0	0	0.00	0
CP Marks	1	2	17	16	8.50	0	1	1	12	12	12.00	0
DC Morgan	28	42	1062	95	31.23	0	1	1	27	27	27.00	0
MH Page	20	33	751	99	25.89	0						
HJ Rhodes	28	32	158	33	6.07	0	1	1	0	0	0.00	0
PE Russell	3	5	104	54	20.80	0						
DHK Smith	28	50	1124	114	24.43	1						
E Smith	28	37	524	63*	16.37	0						
GR Stephenson	7	10	174	64	17.40	0						
RW Taylor	21	28	423	42	19.22	0	1	1	3	3	3.00	0
A Ward	4	5	7	5*	2.33	0	1	1	0	0*		0

Leading first-class batsmen for Derbyshire by runs scored
Name	Mat	Inns	Runs	HS	Ave	100
DHK Smith	30	54	1337	114	27.28	2
DC Morgan	29	44	1110	95	29.42	0
IR Buxton	27	41	1069	105	32.39	1
PJK Gibbs	21	37	916	124	26.94	2
E Smith	30	39	529	63*	15.55	0

Leading ListA batsmen for Derbyshire by runs scored
Name	Mat	Inns	Runs	HS	Ave	100
TJP Eyre	1	1	27	27	27.00	0
DC Morgan	1	1	27	27	27.00	0
CP Marks	1	1	12	12	12.00	0
PJK Gibbs	1	1	3	3	3.00	0
RW Taylor	1	1	3	3	3.00	0

=== Competition bowling averages ===
Name	County Championship					Gillette Cup				
Name	Balls	Runs	Wkts	Best	Ave	Balls	Runs	Wkts	Best	Ave
IR Buxton	462	135	7	2-23	19.28	42	29	0		
JR Eyre	57	33	0							
TJP Eyre	2788	1088	51	5-42	21.33	30	25	0		
PJK Gibbs	217	108	1	1-22	108.00					
JF Harvey	35	4	1	1-0	4.00					
M Hill	12	6	0							
AB Jackson	3478	1057	63	7-22	16.77	72	36	1	1-36	36.00
DC Morgan	4447	1471	76	6-17	19.35	72	49	1	1-49	49.00
MH Page	18	15	0							
HJ Rhodes	4673	1484	94	6-28	15.78	72	56	1	1-56	56.00
PE Russell	438	144	5	3-17	28.80					
DHK Smith	24	20	0							
E Smith	4487	1653	72	5-57	22.95					
RW Taylor	18	8	0							
A Ward	348	188	8	3-26	23.50	72	59	1	1-59	59.00

Leading first class bowlers for Derbyshire by wickets taken
Name	Balls	Runs	Wkts	BBI	Ave
HJ Rhodes	4918	1585	102	6-28	15.53
DC Morgan	4561	1539	77	6-17	19.63
E Smith	5110	1857	81	5-57	22.92
AB Jackson	3706	1168	65	7-22	17.96
TJP Eyre	3262	1277	64	5-42	19.95

Leading ListA bowlers for Derbyshire by wickets taken
Name	Balls	Runs	Wkts	BBI	Ave
AB Jackson	72	36	1	1-36	36.00
DC Morgan	72	49	1	1-49	49.00
HJ Rhodes	72	56	1	1-56	56.00
A Ward	72	59	1	1-59	59.00

=== Wicket Keeping ===
- Bob Taylor

County Championship Catches 56, Stumping 4
Gillette Cup Catches 0, Stumping 0

- Bob Stephenson

County Championship Catches 7, Stumping 2

== See also ==
- Derbyshire County Cricket Club seasons
- 1967 English cricket season
