= David Smith (Derbyshire cricketer) =

English cricketer (1940–2021)

Personal information
- Full name: David Henry Kilner Smith
- Born: 29 June 1940; Shipley, Yorkshire
- Died: 17 December 2021 (aged 81); Harrogate, Yorkshire
- Batting: Left-handed
- Bowling: Right-arm off-break; Right-arm medium
- Role: Opening batsman, occasional wicket-keeper
- Relatives: Lawrence Smith (son)

Domestic team information
- Years: Team
- 1965–1971: Derbyshire
- 1976/77–1977/78: Orange Free State
- FC debut: 21 August 1965 Derbyshire v Somerset
- Last FC: 26 January 1978 Orange Free State v Border
- LA debut: 25 May 1968 Derbyshire v Sussex
- Last LA: 30 May 1971 Derbyshire v Nottinghamshire

Career statistics
Competition	First-class	List A
Matches	114	37
Runs scored	4,995	830
Batting average	26.56	23.71
100s/50s	4/22	0/4
Top score	136	85
Balls bowled	50	0
Wickets	1	–
Bowling average	23.00	–
5 wickets in innings	0	–
10 wickets in match	0	–
Best bowling	1/1	–
Catches/stumpings	84/–	14/–
- Source: CricketArchive, 17 December 2021

David Henry Kilner Smith (29 June 1940 – 17 December 2021) was an English cricketer who played first-class cricket for Derbyshire between 1965 and 1970 and for Orange Free State between 1976 and 1978.

== Biography ==
Smith was born in Shipley, West Yorkshire. His cricketing career began with a season's service in the Derbyshire Second XI, debuting against Northamptonshire in 1964. He continued playing for the Second XI team and made his debut in the Derbyshire first team in the 1965 season, in a draw against Somerset. He played four matches in that season and one match for the first team in the 1966. He was a regular first team player in the 1967 season, scoring centuries against Cambridge University and Essex. In the 1968 season he scored a century against Leicestershire. He made his fourth century in the 1969 season against Lancashire. He played his last first-class season for Derbyshire in 1970 but played one limited over match in the 1971 season. Smith was an opening batsman throughout his time at Derbyshire, alongside John Harvey or Peter Gibbs.

He was never the first-choice wicket-keeper at Derbyshire during his spell, as the England cricketer, Bob Taylor was also at the club, though he took the role on occasion.

From 1976, Smith played two matches for Orange Free State, alongside fellow former-Derbyshire man, Alan Hill, including one match in the Castle Bowl.

Smith was a left-handed batsman and played 114 first-class matches with an average of 26.56 and a top score of 136. He was a right-arm medium-pace and off-break bowler and took one wicket in 50 deliveries. He was an occasional wicket-keeper.

Smith's elder son, Lawrence Smith played first-class cricket for Worcestershire between 1985 and 1987. His younger son, Jason Smith, played for the Gloucestershire second XI between 1985 and 1987.

He died on 17 December 2021, aged 81.
