= Damian Eyre =

Damian Eyre is the name of:

- Damian Eyre (1968–1988), Australian police officer killed in the Walsh Street police shootings
- Damian Eyre (cricketer) (born 1967), English cricketer
