= Ian Hall (English sportsman) =

English footballer and cricketer

Personal information
- Full name: Ian William Hall
- Born: 27 December 1939 (age 86); Sutton Scarsdale, Derbyshire, England
- Batting: Right-handed

Domestic team information
- Years: Team
- 1959–1972: Derbyshire
- FC debut: 30 May 1959 Derbyshire v Middlesex
- Last FC: 15 July 1972 Derbyshire v Surrey
- LA debut: 22 May 1963 Derbyshire v Hampshire
- Last LA: 3 June 1972 Derbyshire v Minor Counties North

Career statistics
Competition	First-class	List A
Matches	270	45
Runs scored	11,666	597
Batting average	25.86	16.13
100s/50s	9/64	0/1
Top score	136*	61
Balls bowled	49	–
Wickets	0	–
Bowling average	–	–
5 wickets in innings	–	–
10 wickets in match	–	–
Best bowling	–	–
Catches/stumpings	189/–	15/–
- Source: CricketArchive, 3 May 2011

Ian Hall
Personal information
- Full name: Ian William Hall
- Date of birth: 27 December 1939 (age 86)
- Place of birth: Sutton Scarsdale, England
- Position: Midfielder

Senior career*
Years	Team	Apps	(Gls)
1957–1959	Wolverhampton Wanderers		
1959–1962	Derby County	44	(13)
1962–1968	Mansfield Town	145	(10)
1968–1971	Tamworth		
1971–1973	Burton Albion		
1973–1974	Derbyshire Amateurs		
1974	Tamworth		
Total		189	(23)
- * Club domestic league appearances and goals

Ian William Hall (born 27 December 1939) is an English former first-class cricketer and professional footballer. He played cricket for Derbyshire between 1959 and 1972, and played football for Derby County F.C. from 1959 to 1962 and for Mansfield Town F.C. from 1962 to 1968.

Hall was born at Sutton Scarsdale, Derbyshire. He first played cricket for Derbyshire in 1955 in a junior match and in the following years played occasionally for the second XI in the Minor Counties Championship. He was also an England Schoolboy and Youth international footballer.

Hall made his debut first-class appearance for Derbyshire in the 1959 season, in a win against Middlesex at Lord's when he made a duck in his second innings. However, later in the season he made his first century of 113 against Hampshire and his average for the season was just over 30. He also started playing football for Derby County in 1959.

He became a regular opening batsman for Derbyshire throughout the early 1960s, keeping his regular opening batting partnership with John Eyre and later with Peter Gibbs. In 1962 he moved to play football for Mansfield Town.

Hall made his top score of 136 against Nottinghamshire in the 1963 season and scored 103 not out against Sussex in the 1964 season. In the 1965 season he scored two centuries in one match against Kent, and in the 1966 season made 102 against Oxford University.

In the 1967 football season, Hall severed an Achilles tendon, which brought his full-time football career to an end after making over 200 Football League appearances. In the 1967 cricket season, he was down to ten matches and played only four times in the 1968 season. In the 1969 season he played ten matches again, but his average was down to 15.

Hall recovered to become a regular fixture for Derbyshire once again at the beginning of the 1970s and scored 107 against Middlesex. He scored no centuries in the 1971 season but his average was up to 33. In the 1972 season, Hall averaged 35 in his eleven matches and scored 136 not out against Oxford University and 105 against Glamorgan before he retired from first-class cricket being replaced in Derbyshire's upper order by Anthony Borrington.

Hall was a right-handed opening batsman and played 483 innings in 270 first-class matches with an average of 25.86 and a top score of 136 not out. He also played 43 innings in 45 one-day matches with an average of 16.13 and a top score of 61. As a bowler he took no first-class wickets in 49 balls. Hall is still the youngest player to make a century for Derbyshire (19 yrs 226 dys). He is also the youngest player to make 1,000 runs in a season (1960) for Derbyshire (20 years 255 days).

After his cricket career, Hall took a B.A. degree at Birmingham University. He later achieved an M.A. at Loughborough University and became a lecturer in sports science at Leicester Polytechnic. He continued to play part-time professional football for Tamworth and Burton Albion until 1974. Hall was secretary of Scarborough Cricket Club. He later became a cricket and football commentator and summariser for BBC Radio Derby (1990–2004)

Ian Hall is the author of Cricket at Scarborough (1992) (a history of the cricket club and its festival), and three books about Derby County: Journey Through a Season (1997), Voices of the Rams (2000) and The Legends of Derby County (2001), all published by Breedon Books Ltd.

== See also ==
- List of English cricket and football players
