= Christopher Marks =

English cricketer

Chris Marks
Personal information
- Full name: Christopher Peter Marks
- Born: 17 July 1946 (age 80); Hanley, Staffordshire, England
- Batting: Right-handed
- Bowling: Right-arm medium

Domestic team information
- Years: Team
- 1967–1969: Derbyshire
- 1971–1973: Staffordshire
- FC debut: 28 June 1967 Derbyshire v Indians
- Last FC: 10 September 1969 Derbyshire v Sussex
- LA debut: 13 May 1967 Derbyshire v Sussex
- Last LA: 11 July 1973 Staffordshire v Lancashire

Career statistics
Competition	First-class	List A
Matches	14	9
Runs scored	216	54
Batting average	11.36	6.00
100s/50s	0/0	0/0
Top score	39	19
Catches/stumpings	6/–	3/–
- Source: CricketArchive, January 2012

Christopher Peter Marks (born 17 July 1946) is a former English cricketer who played for Derbyshire from 1967 to 1969 and for Staffordshire in the one-day game.

Marks was born at Hanley, Staffordshire. In 1964 he joined Derbyshire, and began playing in the Second XI. In the 1967 season he made his first-class debut in a match against the touring Indians, and his first County Championship match came a fortnight later against Gloucestershire. During Derbyshire's 1968 season, Marks was a frequent player with the team and he carried on into the 1969 season also playing second XI matches. In 1970 he joined Staffordshire and played one-day matches for the side in 1971 and 1973.

Marks was a right-handed batsman and played 21 innings in 14 first-class matches with an average of 11.36 and a top score of 39. He played one one-day match for Derbyshire and eight for Staffordshire. He was a right-arm medium-pace bowler and bowled 18 balls in the one day game for Staffordshire.
