= Greg Hill (cricketer) =

English cricketer

Personal information
- Full name: Gregory Russell Hill
- Born: 13 September 1972 (age 54); Canterbury, Kent, England
- Batting: Right-handed
- Bowling: Right-arm off break
- Relatives: Maurice Hill (father)

Domestic team information
- Years: Team
- 1992: Devon
- 2000–2003: Worcestershire Cricket Board

Career statistics
Competition	List A
Matches	6
Runs scored	167
Batting average	41.75
100s/50s	0/1
Top score	56*
Catches/stumpings	4/–
- Source: Cricinfo, 2 November 2010

Gregory Russell Hill (born 13 September 1972) is a former English cricketer. Hill was a right-handed batsman who bowled right-arm off break. He was born at Canterbury, Kent.

Hill made a single Minor Counties Championship appearance for Devon in 1992 against Herefordshire. Hill also represented the county in a single List A match against Kent in the 1992 NatWest Trophy.

In 2000, he made first represented the Worcestershire Cricket Board in List A cricket against the Kent Cricket Board in the 2000 NatWest Trophy. From 2000 to 2003, he represented the Board in 5 List A matches, the last of which came against Worcestershire in the 2003 Cheltenham & Gloucester Trophy. In his total of 6 List A matches, he scored 167 runs at a batting average of 41.75, with a single half century high score of 56*. In the field he took 4 catches.

== Family ==
His father, Maurice, played first-class cricket for Nottinghamshire, the Marylebone Cricket Club, Derbyshire and Somerset.
