= Brian Jackson (cricketer) =

English cricketer (1933–2024)

Personal information
- Full name: Albert Brian Jackson
- Born: 21 August 1933; Kettleshulme, Cheshire, England
- Died: 26 November 2024 (aged 91)
- Batting: Right-handed
- Bowling: Right-arm medium-fast

Domestic team information
- Years: Team
- 1963–1968: Derbyshire
- FC debut: 15 May 1963 Derbyshire v Somerset
- Last FC: 21 August 1968 Derbyshire v Middlesex
- LA debut: 12 June 1963 Derbyshire v Lancashire
- Last LA: 25 May 1968 Derbyshire v Surrey

Career statistics
Competition	First-class	List A
Matches	149	6
Runs scored	647	5
Batting average	8.40	1.66
100s/50s	0/0	0/0
Top score	27	3*
Balls bowled	24,390	354
Wickets	457	4
Bowling average	18.94	30.25
5 wickets in innings	17	0
10 wickets in match	4	0
Best bowling	8/18	2/19
Catches/stumpings	29/–	0/–
- Source: CricketArchive, 29 November 2024

Albert Brian Jackson (21 August 1933 – 26 November 2024) was an English cricketer who played for Derbyshire from 1963 to 1968 and for MCC in 1967.

== Biography ==
Jackson was born in Kettleshulme, Cheshire, and was a mainstay of the Cheshire team in the Minor Counties Championship between 1958 and 1960. After taking 26 wickets for sixteen runs each in 1958, Jackson declined somewhat on the less favourable pitches of 1959 and 1960, but with Cheshire unable to afford any professionals, Brian Jackson was signed by Derbyshire for 1961.

He debuted for the Derbyshire Second XI in the 1961 season in an innings-victory against Nottinghamshire in Epperstone. After playing in the Second XI for two years, Brian Jackson made his first-class debut in the 1963 season against Somerset in May, though he was absent hurt in the match. He saw action in his next game, against Glamorgan, and was a regular member of the side for the rest of the season. He bowled steadily, and in one match against Pakistan Eaglets he took ten wickets for ninety runs. He received his Derbyshire cap and with his unrelated namesake Leslie Jackson retiring was viewed as a future spearhead of the Derbyshire bowling. Like Leslie, Brian Jackson was not a strong batsman: he never reached 30 in a first-class innings and his runs exceeded his wickets by no more than 190 for his whole career.

In the 1964 season, with 79 Championship wickets Brian Jackson was by far the best bowler in the team and critics were impressed by his workrate although his average of 23.59 suggested Derbyshire was losing its traditional strength in pace bowling. However, the 1965 season saw Brian Jackson advance remarkably to form with Harold Rhodes an immensely powerful opening attack: the two bowlers were first and second in the national averages. Jackson's superb outswinger and extremely accurate length made him an extremely formidable opponent on the damp pitches of that summer, and he was never mastered even on the better pitches.

Although with his weakness as a batsman Brian Jackson had not been considered for the 1965 Tests against New Zealand and South Africa, an immense amount was expected of him even at thirty-three (a time when most pace bowlers begin to decline). In the 1966 season he achieved a few superb performances under helpful conditions, such as eight for 18 in the first innings and twelve for 49 in the match against Warwickshire at Coventry but overall the performance was disappointing in this and the 1967 season. In 1967 Jackson took eleven for 69 against Warwickshire at Edgbaston but was dropped from the Derbyshire eleven late in the season. One match for Marylebone Cricket Club (MCC) in 1967 was his only first-class match for a team other than Derbyshire. After a poor performance in the 1968 season, Brian Jackson was not re-engaged for 1969, but he did play along with Leslie and Cliff Gladwin in a limited overs match to commemorate the centenary of the Derbyshire county club.

Jackson returned to Cheshire in the Minor Counties Championship between 1969 and 1970.

On 27 November 2024, it was announced that Jackson had died at the age of 91.
