= David Ward (cricketer, born 1981) =

Australian-born English cricketer

Personal information
- Full name: David Christopher Ward
- Born: 20 July 1981 (age 45); Brisbane, Queensland, Australia
- Batting: Right-handed
- Bowling: Right-arm medium
- Relatives: Alan Ward (father)

Domestic team information
- Years: Team
- 1999–2000: Derbyshire Cricket Board

Career statistics
Competition	LA
Matches	2
Runs scored	23
Batting average	–
100s/50s	0/0
Top score	22*
Balls bowled	102
Wickets	4
Bowling average	19.50
5 wickets in innings	0
10 wickets in match	0
Best bowling	2/31
Catches/stumpings	0/–
- Source: Cricinfo, 15 October 2010

David Christopher Ward (born 20 July 1981) is an Australian-born English former cricketer. Ward was a right-handed batsman who bowled right-arm medium pace. He was born at Brisbane, Queensland.

Ward represented the Derbyshire Cricket Board in two List A cricket matches. These came against Wales Minor Counties in the 1999 NatWest Trophy and the Gloucestershire Cricket Board in the 2000 NatWest Trophy. In his 2 List A matches, he scored 23 with a high score of 22*. With the ball he took 4 wickets at a bowling average of 19.50, with best figures of 2/31.

== Family ==
His father Alan played Test cricket for England as well as first-class cricket for Derbyshire and Leicestershire.
