= Frederick Swarbrook =

English cricketer

Fred Swarbrook
Personal information
- Full name: Frederick William Swarbrook
- Born: 17 December 1950 (age 75); Derby, England
- Batting: Left-handed
- Bowling: Left-arm slow orthodox

Domestic team information
- Years: Team
- 1967–1979: Derbyshire
- 1972/73–1987/88: Griqualand West
- FC debut: 1 July 1967 Derbyshire v Cambridge University
- Last FC: 29 January 1988 Griqualand West v Northern Transvaal B
- LA debut: 7 September 1969 Derbyshire v Hampshire
- Last LA: 19 October 1985 Griqualand West v Transvaal

Career statistics
Competition	First-class	List A
Matches	254	86
Runs scored	6,191	958
Batting average	21.95	18.78
100s/50s	1/25	0/2
Top score	104*	58*
Balls bowled	32,181	2,964
Wickets	467	67
Bowling average	29.97	26.83
5 wickets in innings	15	0
10 wickets in match	2	0
Best bowling	9/20	4/15
Catches/stumpings	149/–	28/–
- Source: CricketArchive, January 2012

Frederick William Swarbrook (born 17 December 1950) is a former English cricketer who played first-class cricket for Derbyshire from 1967 to 1979 and for Griqualand West from 1972/73 to 1987/88.

Swarbrook was born at Derby and began playing for Derbyshire second and other teams in 1965. His first-class debut came in the 1967 season, against Cambridge University, and he made his County Championship debut the following season against Worcestershire. Bowling tightly, he took two wickets for just ten runs in his first bowling stint for the team. He continued to play consistently through to 1971, before being snapped up to play in the southern hemisphere for Griqualand West. The team, however, finished bottom of the Section B table in 1972/73, and within three months Swarbrook was back playing for Derbyshire. He continued in the Currie Cup until 1976, after which he became a fixture in the Derbyshire first team. He played for Derbyshire during a Pakistani tour of England in 1977, and moved back to play for Orange Free State in 1980.

For the next eight years, he stayed in South Africa, completing his stint at Orange before moving to Griqualand West, where he played until 1988. He is the cricket coach at Grey High School in Port Elizabeth.

He was a left-handed batsman and a left-arm slow bowler. While at Derbyshire, Swarbrook remained a lower-order batsman and a strong bowler. Swarbrook hit two ten-wicket matches during his Derbyshire career, once against Oxford University and once against Sussex, taking a match-best 13/62.
