= Derek Morgan (cricketer) =

English cricketer

Personal information
- Full name: Derek Clifton Morgan
- Born: 26 February 1929; Muswell Hill, England
- Died: 4 November 2017 (aged 88)
- Batting: Right-handed
- Bowling: Right-arm medium-fast
- Role: All-rounder

Domestic team information
- Years: Team
- 1950–1969: Derbyshire
- First-class debut: 13 May 1950 Derbyshire v Northamptonshire
- Last First-class: 10 September 1969 Derbyshire v Sussex

Career statistics
Competition	First-class	List A
Matches	556	27
Runs scored	18,356	360
Batting average	24.94	16.36
100s/50s	9/83	0/1
Top score	147	59*
Balls bowled	77,255	989
Wickets	1,248	23
Bowling average	25.08	26.08
5 wickets in innings	35	0
10 wickets in match	5	0
Best bowling	7/33	3/21
Catches/stumpings	573/–	11/–
- Source: CricketArchive, 20 February 2010

Derek Clifton Morgan (26 February 1929 – 4 November 2017) was an English cricketer who played for Derbyshire County Cricket Club between 1950 and 1969, captaining the side between 1965 and 1969. An all-rounder, he is the only Derbyshire cricketer besides Leslie Townsend to have achieved the double of 10,000 runs and 1,000 wickets.

Morgan was born in Muswell Hill, London. He made his first-class debut for Derbyshire in the 1950 season against Northamptonshire in May, when he took two wickets in the first innings and was not out in his only batting innings. He played occasionally for the second XI but was soon established as a first team regular.

In the 1951 season he took 6 for 93 against Gloucestershire. He made his first century of 109 not out against Kent in the 1955 season. In the 1960 season he took 7 wickets for 38 against Yorkshire. In the 1962 season he scored centuries against Sussex, Somerset and Hampshire.

He scored 113 not out against Pakistan Eaglets in the 1963 season and was nominated man of the match in the club's first Gillette Cup match against Hampshire. In this season he achieved his best first-class score of 147 against Hampshire and made 115 against Somerset. He was also nominated man of the match in the first round Gillette Cup game in the 1964 season, although Derbyshire lost.

Morgan became Derbyshire captain in the 1965 season and that year achieved his best bowling performance of 7 for 33 against Glamorgan. In the 1965 County Championship, Derbyshire was twelfth, rising to eighth in the 1966 season. Morgan scored 103 not out against Warwickshire, but the team sank to bottom of the championship in 1967, 1968 and 1969, his last three years as captain. However they were runners up in the Gillette Cup in 1969.

Morgan finished his first-class career with 17,842 runs for Derbyshire, which puts him 3rd on their all-time list. He was a right-hand batsman and played 883 innings in 556 first-class matches with an average of 24.94. He achieved a top score of 147 among his seven centuries. He also played 25 innings in 27 one-day matches. Morgan is also Derbyshire's 5th most successful wicket taker of all time with 1,216 wickets. He was a right-arm fast-medium bowler and achieved an average of 25.08 with 35 5-wicket innings and a best performance of 7 for 33. He also took 23 wickets in the one-day game. He holds the Derbyshire record for catches by a fieldsman, with 563.

Sporting positions
Preceded by Charles Lee	Derbyshire cricket captains 1965–1969	Succeeded by Ian Buxton
