= Lawrence Smith (cricketer) =

English cricketer

Personal information
- Full name: Lawrence Kilner Smith
- Born: 6 January 1964 (age 62); Mirfield, Yorkshire, England
- Batting: Right-handed
- Bowling: Unknown
- Role: Occasional wicket-keeper

Domestic team information
- Years: Team
- 1985–1987: Worcestershire
- 1993: Wiltshire

Career statistics
Competition	FC	LA
Matches	4	2
Runs scored	62	76
Batting average	10.33	38.00
100s/50s	0/0	0/1
Top score	28	73
Balls bowled	42	0
Wickets	1	0
Bowling average	20.00	-
5 wickets in innings	0	-
10 wickets in match	0	N/A
Best bowling	1/20	-
Catches/stumpings	2/0	0/0
- Source: CricketArchive, 8 November 2008

Lawrence Kilner Smith (born 6 January 1964) is an English former cricketer who played first-class and List A cricket for Worcestershire. He later played at minor counties level for Wiltshire, and made a single List A appearance for that county. He also went on Minor Counties' tour of South Africa in 1993–94.

Smith's professional career was not particularly successful: in his few first-team appearances for Worcestershire, his highest score was the 28 he made on debut against Cambridge University, while his solitary success with the ball was the wicket of Warwickshire wicket-keeper Geoff Humpage on Smith's final first-class appearance in July 1987.

Smith's only half-century in senior cricket came for Wiltshire against Durham in the first round of the 1993 NatWest Trophy; opening the batting, he top-scored with 73, but his innings was not enough to avoid a 103-run defeat.

His father David Smith played over 100 times, mainly for Derbyshire, between the mid-1960s and the early 1970s.
