= Maurice Hill (cricketer) =

English cricketer

Personal information
- Full name: Maurice Hill
- Born: 14 September 1935 (age 91); Scunthorpe, England
- Batting: Right-handed
- Bowling: Leg-break
- Relatives: Greg Hill (son)

Domestic team information
- Years: Team
- 1953–1965: Nottinghamshire
- 1966–1967: Derbyshire
- 1970–1971: Somerset
- FC debut: 22 July 1953 Nottinghamshire v Hampshire
- Last FC: 9 June 1971 Somerset v Lancashire
- LA debut: 22 May 1963 Nottinghamshire v Yorkshire
- Last LA: 6 June 1971 Somerset v Gloucestershire

Career statistics
Competition	First-class	List A
Matches	272	20
Runs scored	10,722	334
Batting average	24.09	17.57
100s/50s	7/51	1/0
Top score	137*	107
Balls bowled	359	–
Wickets	5	–
Bowling average	62.20	–
5 wickets in innings	0	–
10 wickets in match	0	–
Best bowling	2/60	–
Catches/stumpings	152/–	5/–
- Source: CricketArchive, December 2011

Maurice Hill (born 14 September 1935) is a former English cricketer who played for Nottinghamshire from 1953 to 1965, for Marylebone Cricket Club (MCC) in 1964, for Derbyshire from 1966 to 1967 and for Somerset from 1970 to 1971. He scored over 10,000 runs in the first-class game.

== Early life and career ==
Hill was born in Scunthorpe, Lincolnshire. For the first twelve years of his cricket career, he played for Nottinghamshire. His debut in the County Championship came against Hampshire in July 1953, though he did not play another first-class match until 1956. Hill's return to the game was highly successful, as he finished just short of a half century on his comeback, and helped Nottinghamshire to an eighth place in the County Championship. In the following season he became a fixture in the first-team, though Nottinghamshire's form faltered, and they finished third-bottom. They stayed at the bottom of the table in the two following seasons, although Hill maintained a quality average throughout these years. He continued to play from 1963 to 1965 for Nottinghamshire and also played for MCC in 1964.

Hill then moved to Derbyshire County Cricket Club in 1966. He performed in the middle order in a low-scoring victory against Surrey and was a first-choice team-member throughout the season. In the 1967 season he made only seven first-class appearances, and achieved an average of 11. Following this, he did not appear in first-class cricket for three years.

In 1970 Hill was given a contract by Somerset for whom he appeared for a single season.

Hill was a right-handed batsman who played in the upper-middle-order. He played 272 first-class matches with an average of 24.09 and a top score of 137 not out. He was a leg-break bowler and took five first-class wickets at an average of 62.20.

Hill's son, Greg, played List A cricket for Devon and Second XI cricket for, amongst other teams, Derbyshire, in the early 1990s.
