= Damian Eyre (cricketer) =

English cricketer

Personal information
- Full name: Damian Richard Eyre
- Born: 8 October 1967 (age 59); Glossop, Derbyshire, England
- Batting: Right-handed
- Bowling: Slow left-arm orthodox
- Relatives: John Eyre (father)

Domestic team information
- Years: Team
- 1999–2001: Lancashire Cricket Board

Career statistics
Competition	LA
Matches	4
Runs scored	4
Batting average	2.00
100s/50s	–/–
Top score	2*
Balls bowled	228
Wickets	3
Bowling average	35.66
5 wickets in innings	–
10 wickets in match	–
Best bowling	2/9
Catches/stumpings	1/–
- Source: Cricinfo, 14 November 2010

Damian Richard Eyre (born 8 October 1967) is a former English cricketer. Eyre was a right-handed batsman who bowled slow left-arm orthodox. He was born at Glossop, Derbyshire.

Eyre represented the Lancashire Cricket Board in List A cricket. His debut List A match came against the Netherlands in the 1999 NatWest Trophy. From 1999 to 2001, he represented the Board in 4 List A matches, the last of which came against the Yorkshire Cricket Board in the 2001 Cheltenham & Gloucester Trophy. In his 4 List A matches, he took 3 wickets at a bowling average of 35.66, with best figures of 2/9.

== Family ==
His father, John, played first-class cricket and List A cricket for Derbyshire.
