= Michael Allen (cricketer) =

English cricketer

Personal information
- Full name: Michael Henry John Allen
- Born: 7 January 1933; Bedford, England
- Died: 6 October 1995 (aged 62); Lancaster, England
- Batting: Right-handed
- Bowling: Slow left-arm orthodox

Domestic team information
- Years: Team
- 1956–1963: Northamptonshire
- 1964–1966: Derbyshire
- FC debut: 23 May 1956 Northants v Worcestershire
- Last FC: 6 July 1966 Derbyshire v Oxford University
- LA debut: 28 April 1965 Derbyshire v Essex
- Last LA: 21 May 1966 Derbyshire v Essex

Career statistics
Competition	First-class	List A
Matches	193	2
Runs scored	1,418	4
Batting average	9.91	4.00
100s/50s	0/2	0/0
Top score	59	4*
Balls bowled	29,218	94
Wickets	500	1
Bowling average	22.43	63.00
5 wickets in innings	25	0
10 wickets in match	3	0
Best bowling	8/48	1/34
Catches/stumpings	171/–	0/–
- Source: CricketArchive (subscription required), 12 June 2021

Michael Henry John Allen (7 January 1933 – 6 October 1995) was an English cricketer who played for Northamptonshire from 1956 to 1963 and Derbyshire from 1964 to 1966.

Allen was born in Bedford and attended Bedford School. A right-handed batsman and a left-arm slow bowler, he started his cricket career at Northamptonshire, who finished in fourth position in the County Championship in his debut season, 1956. Allen debuted against Worcestershire in May and played in more than half the matches in the season. In 1957, Allen moved into a regular first-team place and finished high in the bowling averages, as Northamptonshire finished second in the County Championship table.

During the early part of 1958, Allen played two matches for Marylebone Cricket Club. He played for Northamptonshire throughout the 1958 County Championship season, where, once again, the team played strongly, finishing in fourth position in the table. In 1959, with the emergence of the leg-spin bowler Peter Watts, he played less often in the first team.

The retirement of the spin bowlers George Tribe at the end of the 1959 season and Jack Manning in 1960 gave Allen more opportunities and he played consistently for Northamptonshire until the end of the 1963 season. Northamptonshire finished seventh in the 1963 County Championship table.

Allen moved to Derbyshire for the opening of the 1964 season, debuting against Glamorgan in a rain-affected match. Wisden credited Allen as a factor in Derbyshire's improvement that season from 17th and last to 12th place in the Championship. He represented Derbyshire for two more years, before quitting first-class cricket to join an engineering company in Derby.

Allen was a consistent bowler, accruing five-wicket bowling hauls in eight individual seasons, and securing ten wickets in an individual match three times. He was a lower-order batsman during his Northamptonshire career, switching to the tailend on occasion while playing for Derbyshire.

Allen died at Lancaster on 6 October 1995 aged 62.
