= Peter Eyre (cricketer) =

English cricketer (1939–2025)

Personal information
- Full name: Thomas John Peter Eyre
- Born: 17 October 1939; Brough, Derbyshire, England
- Died: 3 March 2025 (aged 85)
- Batting: Left-handed
- Bowling: Right-arm medium-fast

Domestic team information
- Years: Team
- 1959–1972: Derbyshire
- FC debut: 29 April 1959 Derbyshire v Cambridge University
- Last FC: 15 July 1972 Derbyshire v Surrey
- LA debut: 12 June 1963 Derbyshire v Lancashire
- Last LA: 19 July 1972 Derbyshire v Worcestershire

Career statistics
Competition	First-class	List A
Matches	197	41
Runs scored	3,436	225
Batting average	15.98	8.65
100s/50s	1/10	0/0
Top score	102	27
Balls bowled	21,806	1,778
Wickets	359	59
Bowling average	28.70	19.30
5 wickets in innings	8	1
10 wickets in match	0	0
Best bowling	8/65	6/18
Catches/stumpings	83/–	6/–
- Source: CricketArchive, 21 May 2011

Thomas John Peter Eyre (17 October 1939 – 3 March 2025) was an English cricketer who played for Derbyshire between 1959 and 1972.

== Biography ==
Eyre was born at Brough, Derbyshire. He started playing for the Derbyshire second XI in 1955 and made his first-class debut against Cambridge University in the 1959 season, before his County Championship debut against Surrey two months later. He took a wicket in each match. From the 1960 season he continued playing regularly for both the first and second teams.

He played more first team games in the 1961 season and took two 5-wicket innings in 1961 against Essex and Lancashire. However, in the 1962 season he spent more time in the second XI. In the 1964 season he took 5 for 15 against Leicestershire. He took 5 for 42 against Warwickshire in the 1967 season and in the 1968 season took 5–31 against Glamorgan and 5 for 57 against Northamptonshire. His best season was in 1969 when he achieved his best bowling figures of 8–65 against Somerset and his top score of 102 against Leicestershire. He also took 5 for 70 against Glamorgan and was named man of the match in the Gillette Cup semifinal against Sussex. Eyre played his last first-class matches in the 1972 season but turned out for the second XI in 1973.

Eyre was a right-arm medium-fast bowler and took 359 first-class wickets with an average of 28.70 and a best performance of 8 for 65. He took a further 59 wickets in the one-day game. He was a left-handed batsman and played 264 innings in 197 first-class matches with an average of 15.98 and a top score of 102. He played 32 innings in 41 one-day matches.

Eyre died on 3 March 2025, at the age of 85.
