= Philip Russell (cricketer) =

English cricketer

Personal information
- Full name: Philip Edgar Russell
- Born: 9 May 1944 (age 82); Ilkeston, Derbyshire, England
- Batting: Right-handed
- Bowling: Right0arm medium
- Role: Occasional wicket-keeper

Domestic team information
- Years: Team
- 1965–1985: Derbyshire
- FC debut: 14 August 1965 Derbyshire v Nottinghamshire
- Last FC: 31 August 1985 Derbyshire v Kent
- LA debut: 25 May 1969 Derbyshire v Sussex
- Last LA: 25 June 1986 Derbyshire v Cornwall

Career statistics
Competition	First-class	List A
Matches	170	162
Runs scored	2,020	674
Batting average	12.31	10.87
100s/50s	0/4	0/0
Top score	72	47*
Balls bowled	24,463	7,425
Wickets	339	196
Bowling average	30.53	23.09
5 wickets in innings	5	3
10 wickets in match	0	0
Best bowling	7/46	6/10
Catches/stumpings	123/–	26/–
- Source: CricketArchive, December 2011

Philip Edgar Russell (born 9 May 1944) is a former English cricketer who played first-class cricket for Derbyshire between 1965 and 1985.

== Early life ==
Russell was born in Ilkeston, Derbyshire.

== Career ==
He began playing in the Derbyshire Second XI in 1964, and made his first-class debut at the end of the 1965 season, in a victory against Nottinghamshire. Russell played in the first team in the 1966 season but saw less action on the 1967 season when Derbyshire were in sixth place.

Russell played for Derbyshire solidly for another decade, until the 1979 season, though he came out of retirement six years later to play briefly in the 1985 season, as a 41-year-old. He continued playing in the 1986 season in the one-day game for Derbyshire. Less agile, and supplemented by Derbyshire's Danish wonder, Ole Mortensen, Russell brought no shame upon himself in his later years.

Russell was a right-arm medium pace bowler and took 339 first-class wickets at an average of 30.53 and a best performance of 7–46. He was a right-handed batsman, and played 170 first-class matches with an average of 12.31 and a top score of 73. He was an occasional wicket-keeper.

He went on to have a distinguished career as Head Groundsman at Kingsmead Stadium, Durban, South Africa. He also helped coach Natal cricket from 1999 to 2001, and later the KwaZulu-Natal Dolphins side during the 2004-05 season.

== Personal life ==
Russell's son, Miles, played cricket for the Derbyshire Second XI in 1991.
