= Peter Gibbs (cricketer) =

English cricketer and television script writer

Personal information
- Full name: Peter John Keith Gibbs
- Born: 17 August 1944 (age 82); Buglawton. Cheshire, England
- Batting: Right-handed
- Bowling: Right-arm off-break

Domestic team information
- Years: Team
- 1964–1966: Oxford University
- 1966–1972: Derbyshire
- FC debut: 29 April 1964 Oxford Univ. v Gloucestershire
- Last FC: 9 September 1972 Derbyshire v Lancashire
- LA debut: 13 May 1967 Derbyshire v Surrey
- Last LA: 11 July 1973 Staffordshire v Lancashire

Career statistics
| Competition | First-class | List A |
|---|---|---|
| Matches | 178 | 75 |
| Runs scored | 8,885 | 1,768 |
| Batting average | 29.13 | 24.21 |
| 100s/50s | 11/51 | 0/10 |
| Top score | 138* | 68 |
| Balls bowled | 566 | 30 |
| Wickets | 4 | 1 |
| Bowling average | 80.25 | 13.00 |
| 5 wickets in innings | 0 | 0 |
| 10 wickets in match | 0 | 0 |
| Best bowling | 2/54 | 1/13 |
| Catches/stumpings | 96/– | 19/– |
- Source: CricketArchive, December 2011

Peter John Keith Gibbs (born 17 August 1944) is an English television script writer, and a former cricketer who played first-class cricket for Oxford University from 1964 to 1966, and for Derbyshire from 1966 to 1972.

== Early life and career ==
Gibbs was born at Buglawton, Cheshire, and attended Hanley High School before going up to University College, Oxford. He represented Staffordshire in Minor Counties cricket from the age of 16, making his debut against Cheshire in 1961. He continued to play regularly for Staffordshire until 1965.

== First-class cricket ==
His first-class career began with Oxford University, where he played from 1964 to 1966, playing three times in the annual match against Cambridge. His highest score for Oxford was 126 against Warwickshire in 1964.

Gibbs made his debut for Derbyshire in 1966 after the end of the university cricket season. He played his first County Championship match in a draw against Middlesex, and played five matches for Derbyshire that season.

He established himself in the Derbyshire first team during the 1967 season and was a regular there until the 1972 season. He scored over 1000 runs in each season from 1968 to 1972, his most productive season being 1970, when he scored 1441 runs at 41.17. His highest score was 138 not out against Somerset at Chesterfield in 1969.

Gibbs was a right-handed opening batsman, "a fluent, well-organised player", who mostly partnered David Smith or Ian Hall during his time with Derbyshire. He was also an occasional right-arm off-break bowler.

He rejoined Staffordshire in 1973, playing throughout the season and scoring 617 runs at 36.29 and taking 15 wickets at 18.60.

== Writing career ==
After his cricketing career, Gibbs wrote a number of short plays and comedies for television, many with cricketing themes, and then progressed to writing scripts for major series. Two of his stage plays have been premiered in London, 'Rumblings' (Bush Theatre) and 'Selling The Sizzle' (Hampstead). He has written a dozen plays for BBC radio, including "Supersaver" (1981, with Richard Briers) which won the Prix Futura at the Berlin Festival and "Taking us up to Lunch" (1991), which was set in the Test Match Special commentary box.

In 2012 he published his debut novel, Settling the Score, set in the County Championship in the 1960s.

== TV scripts ==
- Benefit of the Doubt (1983) (TV) Winner of the Radio Times TV Script Award
- Arthur's Hallowed Ground (1984) (TV Film) Producer David Putnam
- Yesterday's Dreams (1987) TV series (7 episodes)
- Matlock (1986) TV series
- Tanamera (1989) TV miniseries. Winner of the Australian Pater Prize for adaptation
- Kinsey (1990) TV series 1 & 2 (12 episodes)
- The Bill (12 episodes, 1990)
- Hetty Wainthropp Investigates (3 episodes, 1998)
- Down to Earth (2 episodes, 2004)
- Heartbeat (53 episodes, 1996–2009)
