= Indian cricket team in England in 1967 =

International cricket tour

- Date: 29 April – 23 July 1967
- Location: England
- Result: England won the series 3–0
Teams
- England: India
Captains
- Brian Close: MAK Pataudi
Most runs
- Ken Barrington (324): MAK Pataudi (269)
Most wickets
- Ray Illingworth (20): B. S. Chandrasekhar (16)

The Indian cricket team toured England in the 1967 season and played 18 first-class fixtures, winning only two, losing 7 and drawing 9.

India played three Test matches and lost the series to England 3–0. The Indian team was captained by Mansoor Ali Khan Pataudi, while Brian Close led the England side. England won the First Test by 6 wickets at Headingley; the Second at Lord's by an innings and 124 runs; and the Third at Edgbaston by 132 runs.

== Test series ==
=== First Test ===
8–13 June 1967
Scorecard

England	v	India
550/4d (183 overs); Geoff Boycott 246 (555); BS Chandrasekhar 2/121 (45 overs)		164 (87.2 overs); MAK Pataudi 64 (206); Ray Illingworth 3/31 (22 overs)
126/4 (47.3 overs); Ken Barrington 46 (106); BS Chandrasekhar 3/50 (19 overs)		510 (209.2 overs) (f/o); MAK Pataudi 148 (348); Ray Illingworth 4/100 (58 overs)

England won by 6 wickets
Headingley, Leeds
Umpires: Charlie Elliott (Eng) and Hugo Yarnold (Eng)

- England won the toss and elected to bat.
- Robin Hobbs (Eng), and Subrata Guha and Ramesh Saxena (Ind) made their Test debuts.
- Basil D'Oliveira (Eng) scored his first century in Tests.
- Geoff Boycott's (Eng) 246 was the highest score for any batsman in Tests between India and England.
- 11 June was a rest day.
- BS Chandrasekhar (Ind) claimed his 50th wicket in Tests.

=== Second Test ===
22–26 June 1967
Scorecard

India	v	England
152 (55.4 overs); Ajit Wadekar 57 (97); John Snow 3/49 (20.4 overs)		386 (154.2 overs); Tom Graveney 151 (308); Bhagwat Chandrasekhar 5/127 (53 overs)
110 (56.3 overs); Budhi Kunderan 47 (164); Ray Illingworth 6/29 (22.3 overs)

England won by an innings and 124 runs
Lord's, London
Umpires: Syd Buller (Eng) and Arthur Jepson (Eng)

- India won the toss and elected to bat.
- 25 June was a rest day.
- John Murray (Eng) equalled the record for most catches by a wicket-keeper in an innings in Tests (6), before Wasim Bari took 7 in 1979.
- Ray Illingworth (Eng) claimed his first five-wicket haul in Tests.

=== Third Test ===
13–15 July 1967
Scorecard

England	v	India
298 (106 overs); John Murray 77 (145); Erapalli Prasanna 3/51 (20 overs)		92 (36.3 overs); Farokh Engineer 23 (45); David Brown 3/17 (11 overs)
203 (76.5 overs); Brian Close 47 (85); Erapalli Prasanna 4/60 (24 overs)		277 (112.4 overs); Ajit Wadekar 70 (214); Brian Close 4/68 (21.4 overs)

England won by 132 runs
Edgbaston, Birmingham
Umpires: Arthur Fagg (Eng) and Fred Price (Eng)

- England won the toss and elected to bat.
- India's 92 in the first innings was their lowest total in a Test innings in 15 years.
- Ray Illingworth (Eng) claimed his 50th wicket in Tests.

== Annual reviews ==
- Playfair Cricket Annual 1968
- Wisden Cricketers' Almanack 1968
