= Alan Ward (cricketer) =

English cricketer (1947–2026)

Personal information
- Born: 10 August 1947; Dronfield, Derbyshire, England
- Died: 15 June 2026 (aged 78)
- Batting: Right-handed
- Bowling: Right-arm fast
- Relatives: David Ward (son)

Domestic team information
- Years: Team
- 1966–1976: Derbyshire
- 1971/72: Border
- 1977–1978: Leicestershire

Career statistics
Competition	Test	FC	LA
Matches	5	163	119
Runs scored	40	928	259
Batting average	8.00	8.43	6.31
100s/50s	0/0	0/0	0/0
Top score	21	44	21*
Balls bowled	761	21,905	5,671
Wickets	14	460	143
Bowling average	32.35	22.81	24.45
5 wickets in innings	0	15	2
10 wickets in match	0	4	0
Best bowling	4/61	7/42	6/24
Catches/stumpings	3/–	51/–	23/–
- Source: CricketArchive, 18 June 2010

Alan Ward (10 August 1947 – 15 June 2026) was an English cricketer, who played in five Test matches for the England cricket team between 1969 and 1976. He played for Derbyshire County Cricket Club from 1966 to 1976, and for Leicestershire from 1977 to 1978. A fast right-arm bowler, he could, with more fortune, have been the perfect foil of his era for John Snow.

== Biography ==
Ward made his first-class debut for Derbyshire in 1966, and topped the English first-class averages in 1969, and was selected for the 1970 Internationals against The Rest of the World side, which contained, on occasion, Garry Sobers and Graeme Pollock. He went to Australia in 1970–71 under Ray Illingworth, who lauded his Ward–Snow opening combination. Snow prospered, picking up thirty one wickets to become the decisive factor in England's claiming the Ashes, but Ward, even before injuries struck, struggled. He was replaced on the tour by Bob Willis.

In 1973, he refused to bowl in a County Championship game against Yorkshire, and Derbyshire's captain, Brian Bolus, banished him from the field. In 1976, he left the county in unhappy circumstances but was called up to play against the West Indies in the fifth, and final, Test Match of his career. On the final day, with the West Indians pressing for victory, he held them for almost an hour before falling for a duck.

Ward joined Leicestershire in 1976. His first-class career ended two years later.

Ward died from amyloidosis on 15 June 2026, aged 78.
