= John Harvey (cricketer) =

English cricketer

Personal information
- Full name: John Frank Harvey
- Born: 27 September 1939; Barnwell, Cambridgeshire, England
- Died: 20 August 2003 (aged 63); Reading, Berkshire, England
- Batting: Right-handed
- Bowling: Right-arm off-break

Domestic team information
- Years: Team
- 1961–1967: MCC
- 1963–1972: Derbyshire
- FC debut: 14 June 1961 MCC v Scotland
- Last FC: 9 September 1972 Derbyshire v Lancashire
- LA debut: 2 May 1964 Derbyshire v Northamptonshire
- Last LA: 25 June 1986 Berkshire v Gloucestershire

Career statistics
Competition	First-class	List A
Matches	206	84
Runs scored	7,538	1,416
Batting average	24.16	19.39
100s/50s	4/33	0/6
Top score	168	67
Balls bowled	71	60
Wickets	1	1
Bowling average	21.00	47.00
5 wickets in innings	0	0
10 wickets in match	0	0
Best bowling	1/0	1/27
Catches/stumpings	87/–	27/–
- Source: CricketArchive, November 2011

John Frank Harvey (27 September 1939 – 20 August 2003) was an English cricketer who played first-class cricket for Marylebone Cricket Club (MCC) from 1961 to 1967 and for Derbyshire from 1963 to 1972.

Harvey was born at Barnwell, Cambridgeshire. He started his first-class career playing one game for Marylebone Cricket Club against Scotland in 1961. In 1962 he umpired two matches for MCC. He was picked up by Derbyshire in 1963 season and, after three matches, made his debut in that year's County Championship against Somerset. He scored a century against Kent in his second Championship match. Though his average fluctuated over following seasons, he continued to perform well throughout the mid-1960s. In the 1966 season he was the only Derbyshire player to score a century in the Championship, and in the 1967 season he scored his best season average. One fine innings was at Chesterfield in the 1968 season when he scored 92 as Derbyshire lost by only eight runs to the touring Australians.

With one season out of the game during his eleven-year spell, Harvey saw the team through some tough times, heading the opening order on his peak form, but happy to perform in the middle order when his form was suffering. Harvey was released from Derbyshire in a shake-up in the 1972 season. He put in one-day appearances for Minor Counties North and Cambridgeshire in 1975 and for Minor Counties East in 1976.

Harvey was a right-handed batsman and played 344 innings in 206 first-class games with an average of 24.16 and a top score of 168. He also played 81 innings in 84 one-day matches. He was a right-arm offbreak bowler and took one first-class wicket at the cost of 71 runs and one in one day cricket.

Harvey became coach and groundsman at Bradfield College, and started playing for Berkshire in 1978. He was captain of Berkshire in 1980 and represented them until the age of 46, in the Minor Counties Championship. Harvey's approach at Bradfield was appreciated by the boys over his 25 years there. Mark Nicholas, who captained Bradfield in 1976 noted "He allowed young cricketers to have their say. There was nothing schoolmasterly about it."

Harvey died in Reading, Berks, aged 63, after suffering from a brain tumour.
