= Michael Page (cricketer) =

English cricketer (1941–2026)

Personal information
- Full name: Michael Harry Page
- Born: 17 June 1941; Blackpool, Lancashire, England
- Died: 15 February 2026 (aged 84)
- Batting: Right-handed
- Bowling: Right-arm off-break

Domestic team information
- Years: Team
- 1964–1975: Derbyshire
- FC debut: 3 June 1964 Derbyshire v Worcestershire
- Last FC: 23 August 1975 Derbyshire v Gloucestershire

Career statistics
Competition	First-class	List A
Matches	254	80
Runs scored	11,538	1,262
Batting average	28.55	16.38
100s/50s	9/63	0/4
Top score	162	83
Balls bowled	888	13
Wickets	7	0
Bowling average	75.28	–
5 wickets in innings	0	–
10 wickets in match	0	–
Best bowling	1/0	–
Catches/stumpings	248/–	34/–
- Source: CricketArchive, 16 June 2010

Michael Harry Page (17 June 1941 – 15 February 2026) was an English cricketer who played first-class cricket for Derbyshire between 1964 and 1975.

== Biography ==
Page was born in Blackpool on 17 June 1941. He began his career with Nottinghamshire and Lancashire, for whom he played briefly for the Second XI, though it was with Derbyshire that he was to decide to play first-class cricket. He signed a professional contract in 1964. Page's Derbyshire debut, in June 1964, was a steady one, as he scored 25 and aided team-mate Edwin Smith in a seventh-wicket partnership of 57 against Worcestershire. In August of the same year he scored 112 against Leicestershire at Chesterfield, the first of nine centuries which included a career-best of 162 against Leicestershire in 1969.

He also helped the Derbyshire team to the runners-up spot in the Gillette Cup competition of 1969. He remained a first-team choice for Derbyshire until his final match for the first team in August 1975. 1975 was one of six seasons in which he scored more than 1000 runs.

Page was a right-handed batsman and a right-arm off-break bowler. At the beginning of his career he bowled occasionally, and he took four wickets on one occasion for Derbyshire's Second XI. Though there was an early attempt to turn him into an opener, his primary role ultimately became that of a middle-order batsman.

Page died on 15 February 2026, at the age of 84.
