= John Eyre (cricketer, born 1944) =

English cricketer

Personal information
- Full name: John Richard Eyre
- Born: 13 June 1944 (age 82); Glossop, Derbyshire, England
- Batting: Right-handed
- Bowling: Right-arm medium
- Relatives: Damian Eyre

Domestic team information
- Years: Team
- 1963–1967: Derbyshire
- FC debut: 22 June 1963 Derbyshire v Leicestershire
- Last FC: 8 July 1967 Derbyshire v Yorkshire
- LA debut: 21 May 1966 Derbyshire v Essex
- Last LA: 25 May 1968 Derbyshire v Sussex

Career statistics
Competition	First-class	List A
Matches	48	2
Runs scored	1,194	56
Batting average	14.92	28.00
100s/50s	1/2	0/0
Top score	106	38
Balls bowled	387	48
Wickets	1	0
Bowling average	248.00	–
5 wickets in innings	0	–
10 wickets in match	0	–
Best bowling	1/8	–
Catches/stumpings	17/–	0/–
- Source: CricketArchive, December 2011

John Richard Eyre (born 13 June 1944) is a former English cricketer who played first-class cricket for Derbyshire from 1963 to 1967.

Eyre was born in Glossop. He started playing for Derbyshire juniors in 1959 and was in the Derbyshire Second XI by 1961. His first-class cricketing career began in 1963, but in three innings in two matches in mid season he made only three runs, and when he reappeared in a single match at the end of the season he did not bat at all. He played just one match in the 1964 season, but was a fairly regular first-team choice in the 1965 season and the 1966 season. However his batting average was less than 16 runs per innings and he passed fifty only once in each season.

In 1967, he made the only century of his county career in the match against Lancashire at Old Trafford, but a month later he was out of the team, and he did not regain his place. He continued in the Second XI until 1968 when he also turned out in the Gillette Cup.

Eyre was a right-handed batsman and played 84 innings in 48 matches with an average of 14.92 and a top score of 106. He also played two innings in two one day matches and made a top score of 38. He was an occasional right-arm medium-pace bowler and took one first-class wicket at the cost of 248 runs.

Eyre's son, Damian Eyre, played Second XI cricket for Derbyshire between 1983 and 1990 and later played List A cricket for the Lancashire Cricket Board.
