= Bob Taylor (cricketer) =

English cricketer (born 1941)

Bob Taylor MBE
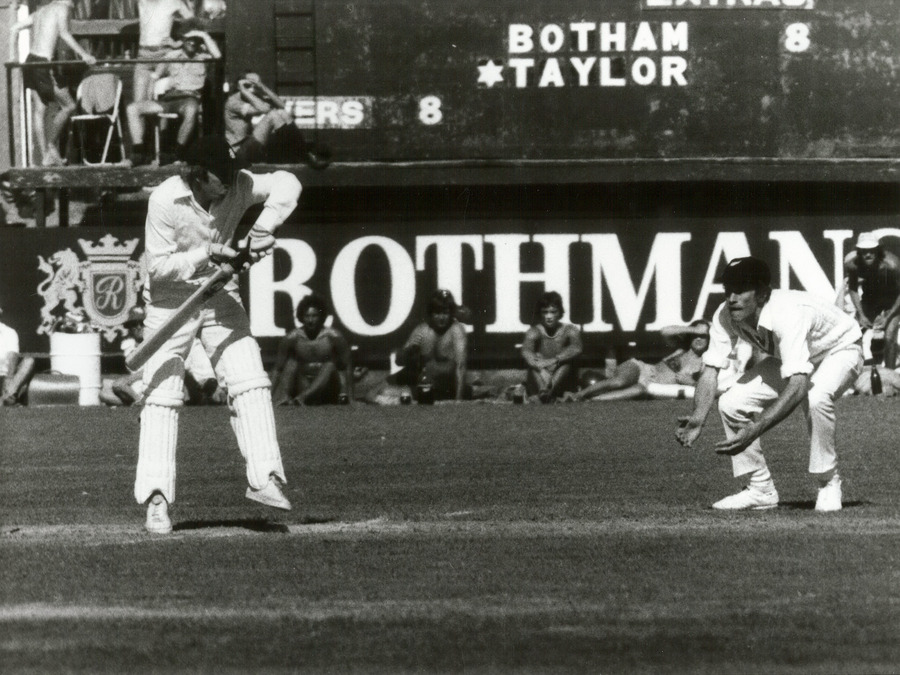
- Taylor batting vs NZ, February 1978

Personal information
- Full name: Robert William Taylor
- Born: 17 July 1941 (age 85); Stoke-on-Trent, Staffordshire, England
- Nickname: Chat
- Batting: Right-handed
- Bowling: Right arm medium
- Role: Wicket-keeper

International information
- National side: England
- Test debut (cap 449): 25 February 1971 v New Zealand
- Last Test: 24 March 1984 v Pakistan
- ODI debut (cap 25): 5 September 1973 v West Indies
- Last ODI: 25 February 1984 v New Zealand

Domestic team information
- Years: Team
- 1961–1988: Derbyshire

Career statistics
Competition	Test	ODI	FC	LA
Matches	57	27	639	333
Runs scored	1,156	130	12,065	2,227
Batting average	16.28	13.00	16.92	14.84
100s/50s	0/3	0/0	1/23	0/1
Top score	97	26*	100	53*
Balls bowled	12	–	117	–
Wickets	0	–	1	–
Bowling average	–	–	75.00	–
5 wickets in innings	–	–	0	–
10 wickets in match	–	–	0	–
Best bowling	–	–	1/23	–
Catches/stumpings	167/7	26/6	1473/176	345/75
Medal record
Men's Cricket
Representing England
ICC Cricket World Cup
Runner-up	1979 England
- Source: Cricinfo, 17 November 2008

Robert William Taylor (born 17 July 1941) is an English former cricketer who played as wicket-keeper for Derbyshire between 1961 and 1984 and for England between 1971 and 1984. He made 57 Test and 639 first-class cricket appearances in total, taking 1,473 catches. The 2,069 victims across his entire career is the most of any wicket-keeper in first-class history. He is considered one of the world's most accomplished wicket-keepers. He made his first-class debut for Minor Counties against South Africa in 1960, having made his Staffordshire debut in 1958. He became Derbyshire's first choice wicket-keeper when George Dawkes sustained a career-ending injury. His final First Class appearance was at the Scarborough Festival in 1988. He remained first choice until his retirement except for a short period in 1964 when Laurie Johnson was tried as a batsman-wicketkeeper. He was a part of the English squad which finished as runners-up at the 1979 Cricket World Cup.

Taylor made his Test debut in 1971 in New Zealand at the end of the successful Ashes winning tour. Though highly regarded, Taylor was unable to displace incumbent Alan Knott, a talented keeper and a superior batsman. It was only when Knott joined World Series Cricket in 1977 that Taylor appeared in more Tests and was selected as one of the Wisden Cricketers of the Year in 1977. He continued to be England's choice keeper through the 1970s, falling three short of a maiden Test century in the 1978–79 Ashes, and retiring from Tests in 1984 – though he would make an emergency appearance for a day of Test cricket in 1986 – and all first-class cricket in 1988.

Taylor was appointed a Member of the Order of the British Empire (MBE) in the 1981 Birthday Honours for services to cricket.

== Early life ==
Taylor was born in Stoke-on-Trent, Staffordshire. He began cricketing early, keeping wicket in a car park next to Stoke City Football Club's home ground, before playing for his schools Under-15 XI aged 12. He also was on the books of Port Vale F.C. as an apprentice, though he never played football professionally. At 15 years he played for Bignall End Cricket Club in the North Staffordshire and District League and for Staffordshire in the Minor Counties cricket league. On his debut he was confused for a spectator because of his youth. He continued playing for Staffordshire from 1958 to 1960, whereupon he moved to Derbyshire and joined the Second XI of Derbyshire County Cricket Club.

== Career ==
=== County stalwart ===
Taylor played in 639 first-class matches. His 1,649 dismissals (1,473 caught, 176 stumped) in 639 games remains a first-class record. With the bat, Taylor averaged only 16.92, and he is one of only two players to have passed 10,000 first-class runs without scoring a century though he subsequently scored exactly 100 against Yorkshire at Sheffield in 1981, his only first-class century. He also took one first-class wicket as a bowler.

He played his debut first-class match against South Africa on 1 June 1960, appearing as keeper for a Minor Counties XI. He scored 11 and a duck and did not take any catches behind the stumps. Thanks largely to recommendations by Cliff Gladwin, he went on to make his County Championship and Derbyshire debut on 7 June the follow year, scoring another duck and eight as well as taking two catches as Derbyshire drew with Sussex at the County Ground, Derby. His first victim was Sussex's Ken Suttle, yet several players observed that he had much to learn; many bowlers condemned him for standing up to the stumps and missing edges. Taylor would go on to play 17 matches in his debut 1961 season for his county, scoring 20 runs at 11.38 with a best of 48, taking 47 catches and 6 stumpings behind the wicket. 29 more games followed in 1960, however his batting remained unimpressive, scoring 300 runs at 10.71 with a best of 44. He remained dependable behind the stumps, with 77 catches and three stumpings. His 77 catches set a new Derbyshire-record. He notched his first half-century in the 1963 season, though averaged under 10.00. His 32 first-class games that season, what would be a career high, and a career-best season total of 81 catches behind the timbers. This included all ten wickets in a match against Hampshire falling courtesy of his glove-work.

The 1964 season was marked for Taylor's mid-season ankle injury. Though it occurred when he was playing football, he told his county that he had slipped on an escalator. According to Wisden the experience taught Taylor to be fastidious in his attention to physical fitness. He nevertheless scored his second half-century and took 58 catches. Nevertheless, Derbyshire considered dropping Taylor for Laurie Johnson, a more capable batsman. An effort with the pen from several Wisden contributors secured his reinstatement, however.

Taylor's strong keeping continued to secure his place in the side, though despite a career best 719 runs in the 1966 season his batting struggled, with no half-centuries to add to his tally. In 1967 his career was again put on hiatus through injury, when he edged a delivery into his own eye and suffered a detached retina which put him on his back for three weeks. He nevertheless took another 63 catches from 23 appearances, but managed only 442 runs at 18.41. His batting in the County Championship saw marginal improvement over the next two seasons, with a half century in 1968 and a career best 65 in 1969. The 1969 season also saw Taylor make his first major forays into List-A cricket. He made 19 appearances that year, having made only seven others over the previous six. He only scored 180 runs, however he took 28 catches behind the stumps which would be a season best for the rest of his career.

Over the winter of 1969, he was selected to tour Sri Lanka with the Marylebone Cricket Club. He played one match, on 20 February 1970, against Ceylon at Colombo. He scored 7 and 19*, and stumped Anura Tennekoon as the MCC moved to a convincing victory. Taylor returned to England for the 1970 county season, continuing his good form behind the stumps with 21 List-A and 51 Championship catches. He also snared 11 stumping victims, a career best. He toured with the MCC over the winter in Australia, with 16 more victims from four matches though his batting disappointed, with 94 runs at only 18.80.

=== New Zealand Test debut ===
With his experience with the MCC, and his county success behind the stumps, Taylor had been coming to the notice of England captain Ray Illingworth. Though Knott was incumbent, Illingworth rewarded Taylor's patience with a Test cap. Taylor made his Test debut against New Zealand at Christchurch on 25 February 1971. In an eight-wicket England victory, he took two catches and a stumping, but scored only four runs before being stumped by his opposite number. His quiet debut escaped any reference in Wisden's match report. He did not play another match on the tour, and would not play another Test for six more years.

=== County interim ===
There are about 300 county cricketers and we can't all play for England. Cricket has taken me to many places I would not otherwise have seen and I'm grateful for that. I am a pro and try to behave like one, but I will admit that I don't enjoy people coming up to me on tour and asking who I am. That's when it really hurts.

— Taylor, having been awarded Wisden Cricketer of the Year for 1977, unaware that he would be returning to Test cricket that winter.

Taylor instead returned to England for the 1971 season, improving with the bat and scoring 619 runs at 24.76, with three half-centuries and a best of 74*. He secured another 68 victims from behind the stumps across all matches. Over the winter of 1971/72, he was selected for the World Test XI tour of Australia, playing seven four-day matches under captain Rohan Kanhai. He took 21 catches, performed three stumpings and although he only scored 128 runs at 16.00 this including a half century against Western Australia on 4 December. He returned to England for the summer of 1972, scoring another half century and snaring fifty batsmen from behind the stumps in the County Championship, and a further 23 in the one day arena. A further 77 batsmen fell to Taylor in 1973, and he earned a place on the MCC winter tour of the West Indies. Although not being selected for the Test series over the incumbent Knott, he scored 65 against Jamaica on 9 February, outscoring Knott's five. In doing so, he passed 6,500 first-class runs in his career.

Taylor became a regular back-up keeper for Knott on England's winter tours. After a solid 1974 season with another County Championship half century and 86 victims with the gloves, he toured New Zealand with the England national side, and following 111 more wickets in 1975 toured South Africa with the International Wanderers under Greg Chappell. On facing a South African Invitation XI in Johannesburg on 2 April Taylor, batting in the second innings, scored a career best 97 before being dismissed by Howard Bergins. Over 1976 and 1977, he took 164 more dismissals, and scored 910 runs including another half-century. He was selected as Wisden Cricketer of the Year for 1977, along with Mike Brearley, Gordon Greenidge, Michael Holding and Viv Richards.

=== Return to Tests ===
Knott, the incumbent keeper for England, turned to World Series Cricket in 1977 on the encouragement of Tony Greig and was thus banned from Test cricket. Taylor was the next in line to take up the gloves, and returned to Test cricket on 14 December 1977 against Pakistan at the Gaddafi Stadium in Lahore. Although there had been three first-class warm-up fixtures, Taylor had not impressed with the bat and had been rotated out of the second game in order for Paul Downton to have a chance at the gloves. Taylor nevertheless got the nod for the first Test. Captained by fellow Wisden Cricketer of the Year Brearley, he took two catches and a stumping, and score a lengthy 32 from 158 deliveries supporting Geoff Miller who was eventually stranded on 98. He played in the following two Tests of the series, and though keeping tidily he was dismissed for a first ball duck – a score of zero – in the second Test, though improved with a slow (and then career best) 36 from 200 balls and 18 not out in the third match. He also played in the 2nd and 3rd One Day International fixtures. He remained the incumbent gloveman for the New Zealand leg of the tour, appearing in two warm up games and three Tests. He took four catches in the first, all from the bowling of Chris Old, and scored a career-best 45 in the second. His 236 runs across the entire tour came at 21.45, and he took 20 catches and a stumping.

Taylor returned to the County Championship for three matches before the home Pakistan Test series. Taylor played in all three Tests, keeping well with eight catches but batting poorly, with 12 runs at only 6.00. Although he took five catches and three stumpings in the ODI series, he batted only once and did not score. He only had two more County Championship appearances before the home Test series against New Zealand on 27 July, where despite 12 catches and a stumping he again averaged low with the bat – 31 runs at 10.33. However, the importance of his work behind the stumps was recognised when he was named 'Player of the Series', and he retained his place in the team.

=== 1978/79 Ashes series ===
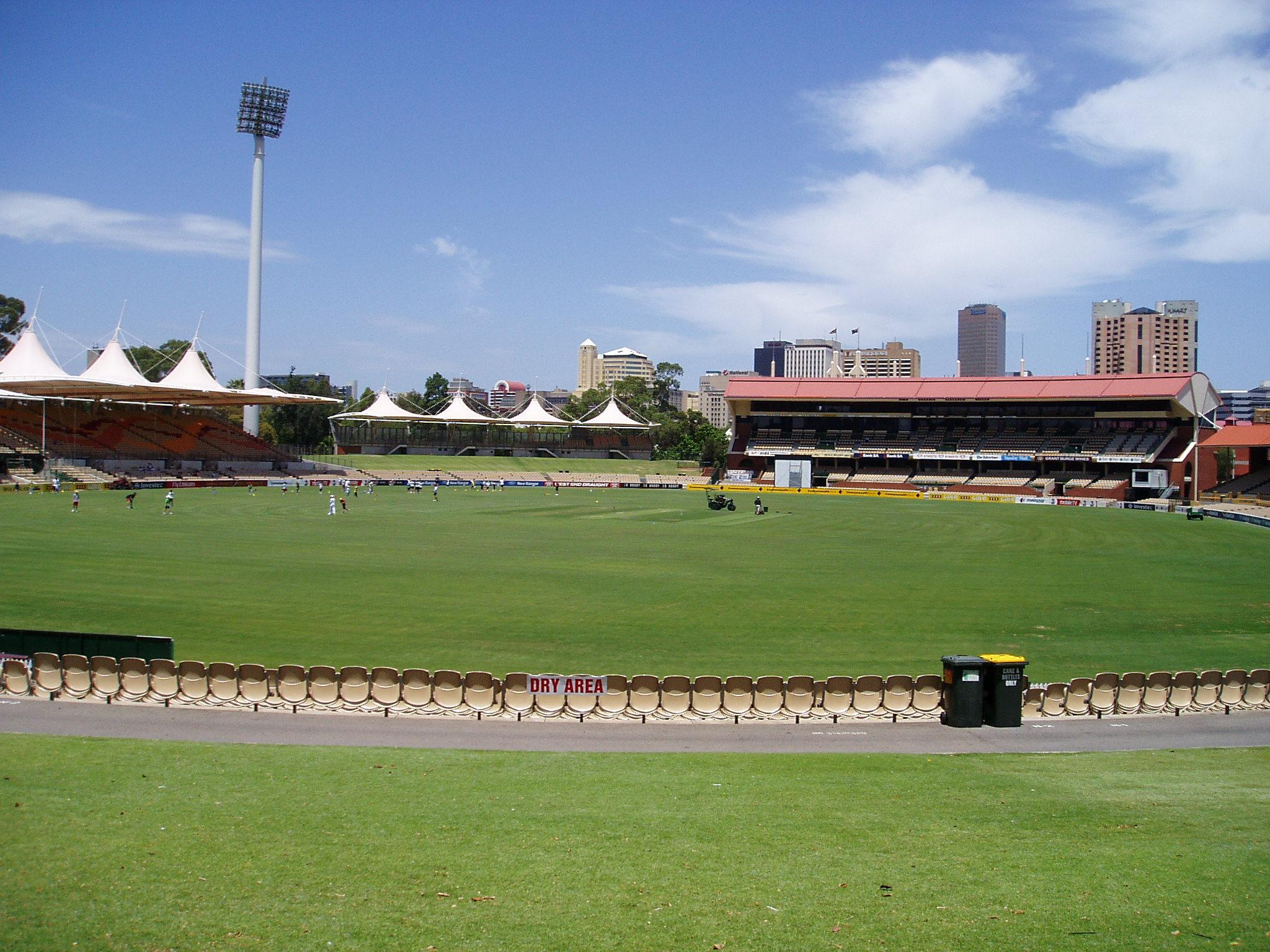
The Adelaide Oval, scene of Taylor's career-best 97.

Taylor joined the England team for the winter Ashes series of 1978/79, commencing the tour by facing South Australia on 3 November 1978. Though it was a quiet game with the bat, Taylor was in strong form behind the stumps – collecting eight victims though the tourists went on to lose the match. Facing New South Wales on 17 November, Taylor hit a forgettable nine, however four more scalps came, two of them from what was becoming a prolific partnership, both for England and Derbyshire, with Geoff Miller.

England went into the first Test on 1 December with mixed success in the warm up matches behind them. Australia batted first, however with wickets for Bob Willis, Old and Ian Botham, and five catches for Taylor, they were removed for only 116. Taylor, batting at number four, scored 20 runs as England replied with 286; however, the tourists' bowling success would not strike twice as Australia reached 339 in the second innings and Taylor was quiet behind the stumps during that innings. England reached the required total with 170/3 and thus won by seven wickets.

England, however, took a 166 run victory in the second Test, commencing on 15 December at the WACA. Taylor made only 14 runs, but he held onto six catches for England's potent bowling attack. Australia replied with a 103-run victory in the third Test, and Taylor was quiet both with the gloves and the bat. The fourth Test was equally unspectacular for Taylor, though England took a series-lead with a 93-run victory.

On 27 January 1979, Geoffrey Boycott and Brearley walked out to bat at the Adelaide Oval for the fifth Test, having been put in by Australia. The tourists were routed for 169 all out with Taylor only making four runs. He partnered with Botham to take two catches as Australia were, in return, routed for 164. England, needing to set a commanding total, were precariously poised at only 132/6 when Taylor walked out to bat with his Derbyshire colleague Miller. Miller went on to make 64 before he was dismissed and John Emburey came to the crease, however, by the time Taylor was sent back England had reached 336/8, Taylor having scored 97 runs from 300 balls. He passed his previous Test best of 45, and with his 97th run he both equalled his first-class best and reached 9,500 first-class runs. His dismissal was to a "tiny leg-side tickle" though, despite being three from a hundred, he chose to walk off the field. John Thicknesse in 2004 wrote that "it said everything about his sportsmanship." Though Taylor took no catches in the final innings, Willis and Mike Hendrick combined to reduce Australia to 160 all out and give England victory. Taylor made 36 in the final Test match, three catches and a stumping as England took a convincing nine-wicket victory to seal the series. Taylor's 208 runs at 26.00 outscored captain Brearley, and he ended the Test series with 18 catches and two stumpings.

Taylor played a one-day warm up match against Tasmania, however his ODI place was taken by David Bairstow.

=== 1979 World Cup ===
Taylor returned to England to make several Benson and Hedges Cup and John Player League List-A appearances, and resumed his capable keeping for Derbyshire in the County Championship – in a match against Leicestershire on 2 May he took four catches and performed two stumpings. In June, the 1979 Cricket World Cup commenced in England, and Taylor was selected as keeper for the tournament which consisted of 60 overs per innings. England were seen as good prospects for the tournament, having won five of their previous six Tests thanks, according to Wisden, to "the bowlers, Bob Taylor's skilful wicket-keeping, and the all-round excellence of Ian Botham." 9 June saw the opening match of Group A, where England faced Australia at Lord's. Taylor took one catch, but was not called on to bat as the hosts won by six wickets. Nor was he required to bat on 13 June when, in a two-day game where England demolished Canada for 45 all out and won by eight wickets. Against Pakistan on 16 June at Headingley he scored 20 from 59 balls and took two catches as England won by a narrower margin of 14 runs.

England thus reached the semi-finals, and faced New Zealand at Old Trafford on 20 June. Taylor, batting at nine, scored 12 runs from 25 before he was run out, and New Zealand fell to 212 chasing 221. The final took place at Lord's on 23 June against the West Indies. The host team – minus an injured Willis – put the West Indies into bat, however a century from Viv Richards took them to 286/9 – with Taylor taking one catch. Despite an opening partnership of 129 between Brearley and Boycott, England fell 92 runs short at 194 all out. Taylor, batting at ten, was dismissed for a first-ball duck from Joel Garner before Hendrick was bowled by Colin Croft to seal the West Indies' victory. Taylor's returns were modest, scoring only 32 runs at 16.00 with a best of 20*, and taking four catches but no stumpings.

Taylor returned to Derbyshire, who had reached the Semi-Final of the Benson and Hedges Cup, however despite taking two catches and scoring eight runs, Surrey took a six-run victory and knocked Derbyshire out of the competition. On 12 July, Taylor was back with the England team for three Tests against India, where he proved himself more formidable with the bat – with a knock of 64 inflating his average to 32.50.

=== Australia 1979/80, 1981 ===
From August 1979 to November 1981, Taylor and England would play Australia in two Ashes series, with one other Test against India. Taylor acquitted himself well over the winter tour of Australia and India, scoring 145 runs from four matches at 20.71, and his polished glovework took 20 catches and performed one stumping. On 15 February 1980, during the only Test against India in Bombay to celebrate the Golden Jubilee of the Board of Control for Cricket in India, Taylor took seven catches in India's first innings, and three more in the second, all but two off the bowling of Botham. England won convincingly by ten wickets. His ten wickets for the match set a new world Test record. Taylor's 43 runs with the bat set a partnership of 171 runs with Botham, also a record sixth-wicket partnership for England against India. This included Taylor begin dismissed leg before wicket only to protest the decision and have his reservations supported by the Indian captain Gundappa Viswanath.

Taylor returned for the 1980 County Championship in England, and although he scored only 238 runs at 14.87 from 20 appearances he took 34 catches and performed seven stumpings, Derbyshire camp joint ninth that season.

On 10 June 1981, the touring Australian side faced Derbyshire in Derby in a three-day drawn match. Taylor had as quiet game. remaining five not out and not taking part in any wickets. On 17 June, however, during a county Championship match against Yorkshire, Taylor hit the only century of his career. Having taken two catches and performed two stumpings in Yorkshire's first innings of 374, he helped Derbyshire reach 480 with an innings of exactly 100 before being caught and bowled by Phil Carrick. The match was drawn before the third innings could begin.

Taylor again missed out on a place in the ODI team for the Prudential Trophy against Australia, with Geoff Humpage making the only three international appearances of his career. Paul Downton also took his place for the first Test of the 1981 Ashes series, where Australia took a four-wicket victory. Taylor was on the pitch for the 2nd Test, however, and despite scores of zero and nine took four catches as the match was drawn. In the third Test at Headingley, Taylor took seven catches though was outshone by Botham's all-round performance in England's 18-run victory. Two catches and eight runs came in England's 29 run win at Edgbaston on 30 July, where he kept John Emburey company in an important partnership of 50 runs.

Before the fifth Test, however, Knott – having returned from the Packer series and been admitted back into the Test fold, was awarded Taylor's place for the final two Tests. Taylor, his 1981 Ashes series truncated, finished with only 23 runs at a dire 3.83 average – the lowest of the entire England team including specialist bowlers. His keeping has netted him 13 catches, however. Knott, selected for his superior batting skills, scored 178 runs from his two Test matches at 59.33. Taylor instead returned to Derbyshire, and ended his season with 231 runs at 19.25, including his maiden century, 33 catches and 12 stumpings. He also helped Derbyshire to win the NatWest Trophy that season.

=== Final years ===
Taylor toured India and Sri Lanka over the winter of 1981/82, playing in seven Test matches. Though his keeping accounted for 19 batsmen, he scored only 88 runs over eight innings at 14.66. He kept for only two of the ODI matches, with Jack Richards taking the gloves from him for the rest. After a brief return to Derbyshire for the County Championship in May, he was again in the Test squad for the home series against India, taking nine catches but again a low 12.00 runs per innings from the three matches. Pakistan swiftly followed, and Taylor made 54 in England's second innings of the first Test at Edgbaston on 29 July,

On 22 October he commenced his 1982/83 tour of Australia by passing 11,000 first-class runs in a match against Queensland, before keeping wicket for all five Tests. Though he scored only 135 runs at 19.28, he took another 13 catches. He again missed out on the one day position, however, this time to Ian Gould. Upon his return he played several matches for Derbyshire in the County Championship. His batting would continue to struggle, only 267 runs at 17.80, though he kept tidily with 37 catches and two stumpings through the season. Commencing in mid-July, he also took part in a four-Test home series against New Zealand, taking 11 catches but failing to make an impression with the bat – 63 runs at 10.50. He returned to New Zealand that winter, and then on to Pakistan, though despite keeping well he failed to score more than 83 runs at 9.22. He featured in all three ODI matches, however, taking two catches but scoring only 10 runs at 5.00 per innings. His batting was consistently below par despite his keeping ability, and the third test against Pakistan on 19 March 1984 at Lahore was to be his last. It was a quiet game for him, scoring only one and five, and taking one catch in a drawn fixture.

Taylor played a full stint in the 1984 County Championship, playing 18 matches and scoring 303 runs at 20.20, as well as taking 32 victims with the gloves. Derbyshire could only manage twelfth. Taylor fared well with the gloves in the one day tournaments also, taking 10 catches in the Benson and Hedges Cup, and eight more in the John Player Special League.

On 8 September Taylor commenced his final four days playing for Derbyshire's First XI. On that day, his last County Championship match began against Hampshire. No play took place on the following day, 9 September, to allow the John Player Special League match between the two counties, where Taylor look two catches but was not called on to bat. Following this game, on 10 September, the County Championship resumed with Hampshire on 535/4, Taylor having taken one catch to remove Trevor Jesty from the bowling of Ole Mortensen. Derbyshire declared without losing another wicket, and Derbyshire reached 322/3 declared without Taylor having to bat thanks to centuries from Kim Barnett and Bill Fowler. Taylor completed a stumping from Miller to restrict Hampshire to 245/8, and Derbyshire chased down the final total for a five-wicket victory without Taylor needing to come out of the pavilion. He then retired.

This would not be Taylor's last outing with the club, however. He captained Derbyshire Second XI in 1985 for eight games, though he did not keep wicket. Batting last in the order, he was rarely called on to bat. During New Zealand's 1986 Test match at Lord's, Taylor was present in the hospitality tent when Bruce French was injured by a Richard Hadlee delivery. After trialling Bill Athey behind the wicket, New Zealand captain Jeremy Coney permitted Taylor to come on the field to keep for the remainder of the day. Wisden recorded "[Taylor] equipped himself with an assortment of borrowed kit, although he did, far-sightedly, have his own gloves in his car... Despite having retired from first-class cricket two years earlier, Taylor ... kept without a blemish." Bobby Parks was brought in to keep for the following day. Also in 1986, Taylor was selected as part of Brian Close's invitational XI to play New Zealand at Scarborough on 31 August. Taylor kept wicket, and scored 21 as well as taking two catches. He was part of Michael Parkinson's World XI in 1988, playing against the MCC where Taylor again kept wicket and scored four runs. He also appeared in a testimonial match at Trent Bridge for former England team-mate Derek Randall in 1993, playing for an England XI against an Australian XI, and he was at the wicket (batting with David Bairstow) when this match ended in a tie.

== Style and equipment ==
Taylor's wicket keeping abilities have been oft praised. In his citation for Cricketer of the Year for 1977, Wisden noted that "artistry – there is no other word for it – behind the stumps has long illumined even the darkest hours of Derbyshire cricket." He was known both for his acrobatic fielding behind the stumps, and his diligence and stamina, "he has been without peer in the world for some years and would clearly have graced the England team but for Alan Knott." He was noted for standing up to the stumps on nearly all occasions, stating that "Any decent slip catcher could do it standing back." By keeping his weight forwards and planted on his left foot, he was a skilled leg side stumper – considered a difficult skill in wicket keeping.

Taylor was careful with his fitness, following an ankle injury in 1964 kept him from the first seven games of the season. Taylor wore two pairs of thin Chamois inners and Mitre wicket-keeping gloves from which he cut away all the padding from inside the palms and removed the webbing. His reasoning for this was that he liked to feel the ball in his palm and if taking the ball correctly most of the time the bruising wasn't too troublesome. This can be contrasted with Knott who preferred plenty of padding on his palms.

Taylor was a renown member of the England and Derbyshire squads, his nickname "Chat" deriving from his willingness to talk to his teammates and listen to their problems. Taylor, who played as a wicket-keeper and batsman, advocates for selecting players based on their wicket-keeping skills rather than their batting ability. He has been vocal over English selection policies since retirement, particularly those of Geraint Jones, Chris Read and Matt Prior.

Sporting positions
Preceded by Brian Bolus	Derbyshire cricket captains 1975–1976	Succeeded by Eddie Barlow
