= Les Jackson (cricketer) =

English cricketer (1921–2007)

Personal information
- Full name: Herbert Leslie Jackson
- Born: 5 April 1921; Whitwell, Derbyshire, England
- Died: 25 April 2007 (aged 86); Chesterfield, England
- Batting: Right-handed
- Bowling: Right-arm fast
- Role: Bowler

International information
- National side: England
- Test debut: 23 July 1949 v New Zealand
- Last Test: 6 July 1961 v Australia

Domestic team information
- Years: Team
- 1947–1963: Derbyshire

Career statistics
Competition	Test	First-class
Matches	2	418
Runs scored	15	2,083
Batting average	15.00	6.19
100s/50s	0/0	0/0
Top score	8	39*
Balls bowled	498	83,267
Wickets	7	1,733
Bowling average	22.14	17.36
5 wickets in innings	0	115
10 wickets in match	0	20
Best bowling	2/26	9/17
Catches/stumpings	1/–	137/–
- Source: CricketArchive, 24 June 2010

Herbert Leslie Jackson (5 April 1921 – 25 April 2007) was an English professional cricketer. A fast or fast-medium bowler renowned for his accurate bowling and particular hostility on uncovered wickets, he played county cricket for Derbyshire from 1947 to 1963, and was regularly at, or near the top of, the English bowling averages. He played in only two Test matches for England, one in 1949 and a second in 1961. Jackson's absence from Test cricket was largely because his batting was so underdeveloped: his highest first-class score was 39 not out, and he reached 30 on only two other occasions. Between July 1949 and August 1950, Jackson indeed played fifty-one innings without reaching double figures, a number known to be exceeded only by Jem Shaw, Nobby Clark, Eric Hollies (twice), Brian Boshier and Mark Robinson. His leading competitors like Trueman, Tyson, and even teammate Gladwin were far better batsmen.

Cricket writer, Colin Bateman, noted, "it is one of cricket’s great crimes that Les Jackson, a most respected fast bowler on the circuit throughout the 1950s, played only twice for England. It is said that his slingy, hostile action and his blunt opinions did not please the Marylebone Cricket Club (MCC) but in an era when Alec Bedser carried England‘s attack on his own, Jackson’s omission was a scandalous loss". Bateman added that Jackson, "...was as feared as Trueman and Tyson in county cricket".

== Life and career ==
Jackson was born in the mining village of Whitwell in Derbyshire, the youngest of thirteen children. His eldest brother had been killed in World War I; another brother was one of eighty who perished in the Creswell colliery disaster in 1950.

He was educated at Whitwell Church of England School, and became a miner at the age of 16. His father was a cricketer, and Jackson began his cricket career at Whitwell Cricket Club, where, until his demise, he could still be found on the occasional Saturday watching them play.

Jackson was genuinely quick from a slingy action, and remarkably accurate and economical. He was able to swing the ball both ways and move off the seam, and his six-foot height enabled him to make the ball lift awkwardly from just short of a length. He bowled from a short run-up, which enabled him to continue bowling for lengthy periods, and was particularly difficult to play on the uncovered wickets used in county cricket.

After many delays, including the outbreak of World War II, Jackson became a professional with Worksop in 1947, playing in the Bassetlaw League and joined Derbyshire later in the 1947 season, making his first-class debut against Kent on 5 July 1947. He formed formidable bowling partnerships with Cliff Gladwin, and then with Harold Rhodes, both also England Test players. In the 1949 season, his second full season after joining Derbyshire, he took 120 wickets at a bowling average of 20.41. After a successful Test trial taking six for 37, Jackson was selected in 1949 for the third Test against New Zealand at Old Trafford. He made his Test debut alongside Brian Close, opening the bowling with Trevor Bailey while the first choice fast bowler, Alec Bedser, was rested. Jackson met with some success, taking 2 for 47 and 1 for 25, but the match was drawn and he was replaced by Bedser for the fourth and deciding Test. He was not chosen to tour Australia in 1950–51, losing out to John Warr whose sole Test wicket came at a cost of 284 runs, but toured to India instead with a Commonwealth side, only to return home early with an elbow injury. Jackson played in another Test trial in 1950, but was unable to make much of an impression: on a soft wicket Jim Laker took 8 wickets for 2 runs, Bob Berry did the bulk of the bowling for "The Rest" and Jackson's bowling was described as "mediocre".

Nonetheless, Jackson averaged under twenty runs a wicket in every season from 1951 to 1962, and took 100 or more in every season except 1951, 1955 (Note: He missed 13 Championship matches with a shoulder injury in 1955.) and 1961 when he was severely handicapped by injuries. In the 1958 season, he took 143 wickets at an average of 10.99 runs per wicket, an average not equalled by any regular first-class bowler since and not previously seen since the days of Tom Richardson. This feat was all the more extraordinary because owing to a serious groin strain Jackson bowled at only medium pace for most of the season. Jackson was one of the Wisden Cricketers of the Year in 1959, then took a further 140 wickets in 1959 (being the first to reach 100), and then 160 at 13.61 in 1960. In all, he passed 100 wickets in ten domestic seasons. Fred Trueman described Jackson as "The best six-days-a-week bowler in county cricket".

Jackson had to wait twelve years to play his second Test, allegedly and almost certainly due to upper class prejudice by the England captain Freddie Brown in early years, and of England selector Gubby Allen later. He was finally selected for the third Test against the 1961 Australians at Headingley, when he was 40 years old. Again, he was chosen to replace the first-choice fast bowler, Brian Statham, who had a side strain, and again he provided able support, this time to Trueman, taking 2 for 57 and 2 for 26, as England won by eight wickets. Statham came back for the final two Tests, and Jack Flavell was picked ahead of Jackson. He never played Test cricket again. The 12-year gap between his appearances is the longest of any England Test player with only two caps.

Jackson retired from Derbyshire at the end of the 1963 season, having taken more wickets for Derbyshire than any other bowler, a record that still stands (1,733 first-class wickets at 17.36 apiece). He then played for Enfield in the Lancashire League in 1964, and for Undercliffe in the Bradford League from 1965 to 1970. Jackson, along with Derbyshire namesake Brian and longtime partner Gladwin (who was then 54), played his last game at the age of 49 for Marylebone Cricket Club (MCC) against Derbyshire on 5 July 1970, a 40-overs match commemorating the centenary of Derbyshire's first match at Lord's in 1870. Jackson was elected President of the Derbyshire Players' Association in 1995.

He continued mining in the winter through much of his cricketing career, later becoming a chauffeur for the National Coal Board until 1982. His death, in Chesterfield, Derbyshire, after a short illness was announced on Test Match Special on 25 April 2007, less than three weeks after his 86th birthday. He married his wife, Norma, in 1942; she died in 1991. He was survived by their daughter.
