= Mark Robinson (cricketer, born 1966) =

English cricketer

Mark Robinson OBE
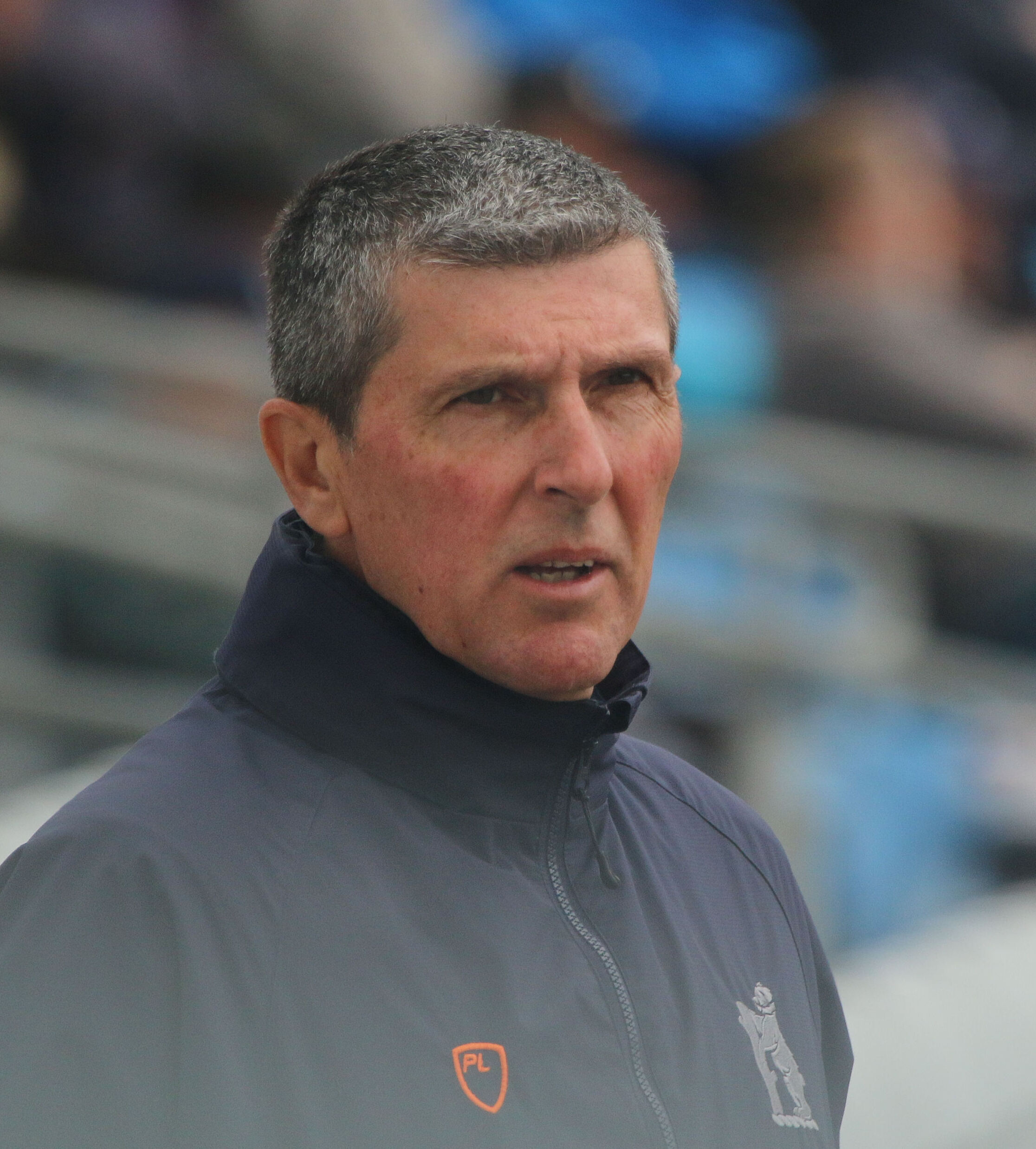
- Robinson in 2022

Personal information
- Full name: Mark Andrew Robinson
- Born: 23 November 1966 (age 59); Hull, Yorkshire, England
- Nickname: Robbo
- Batting: Right-handed
- Bowling: Right-arm fast-medium
- Role: Bowler; Coach

Domestic team information
- Years: Team
- 1997–2002: Sussex
- 1991–1995: Yorkshire
- 1988/89: Canterbury
- 1987–1990: Northamptonshire

Career statistics
Competition	FC	LA
Matches	229	242
Runs scored	590	158
Batting average	4.01	3.16
100s/50s	0/0	0/0
Top score	27	15*
Balls bowled	37,689	11,738
Wickets	584	256
Bowling average	30.49	30.27
5 wickets in innings	13	0
10 wickets in match	2	0
Best bowling	9/37	4/23
Catches/stumpings	41/–	25/–
- Source: ESPNcricinfo, 18 December 2022

Mark Andrew Robinson OBE (born 23 November 1966) is a former English cricketer turned coach.

== Playing career ==
A right-arm fast-medium bowler who played for three different English counties (Northamptonshire, Yorkshire, and Sussex). He also spent one season in New Zealand, playing for Canterbury.

== Coaching career ==
After retiring from playing, he served as coach of Sussex from 2005 to 2015, winning County Championships with the team in 2006 and 2007, and also coached several England Lions tours.

He led the England women's cricket team to the 2017 World Cup.

He was awarded an OBE in the Queen's 2018 New Year Honours.

On 26 December 2020, Mark Robinson was set to become Bangladesh women's team head coach.

On 21 January 2021, he was appointed Warwickshire head coach. He left the position in February 2025.

== Early career ==
After a number of appearances in Northamptonshire's second XI, Robinson made his first-class debut in 1987 against Lancashire, taking four wickets in the match including those of Mike Watkinson and Neil Fairbrother. By the end of the season he was playing a significant part in the first team, and the following year he took 46 first-class wickets at 22.93. He spent the winter in New Zealand playing for Canterbury. Returning to Northants for 1989, Robinson claimed 37 wickets.

== A world record, then to Yorkshire ==
1990 saw Robinson surpass even this level of ineptitude with the bat, when he set a world record of 12 first-class noughts in a row (seven of them not out). In all cricket, including second-eleven games, he failed to score in 17 innings from 15 May until 18 August, finishing the season with a total of three runs in 16 first-class innings, with a highest score of 1*; only his ten not-outs helping his season's batting average to the dizzy heights of 0.50. This feat rather overshadowed his bowling for the summer: he took 40 wickets, but at a rather unimpressive average (even considering that year's batting-friendly conditions) of 47.22; his List A figures (24 wickets at 37.91) were somewhat better.

For the 1991 season he moved to Yorkshire, he scored a boundary from the first ball (in an innings of 8), he faced on his debut versus Middlesex at Lord's. Although he had a mediocre year and averaged nearly 50 with the ball, Yorkshire's faith in him was rewarded the following summer. In 1992 he claimed 50 first-class victims at 22.68, taking five wickets in an innings three times, though he had a poor year in the limited-overs game. He also reached double figures with the bat for the first time in three and a half years when he made 12 against Hampshire in May. In between, he had played sixty one innings without reaching double figures, which is the fourth longest such sequence after Jem Shaw between 1865 and the last match of 1870 (71 innings), Eric Hollies between 1948 and 1950 (71 innings) and his Northamptonshire predecessor Nobby Clark between 1925 and 1927 with 65 consecutive single-figure innings.

Robinson remained at Yorkshire for three more summers, taking between 45 and 49 wickets in each of them. In 1993 he achieved a career-best innings return of 9–37 against his old county of Northamptonshire, and also took his career-best List A figures of 4–23 (which he was to equal in 2000). However, after the end of the 1995 season he spent an entire year out of the game before Sussex signed him for the 1997 season.

== Sussex and retirement ==
His first year with his new county proved to be Robinson's best ever with the bat as he passed a hundred runs for the season for the first (and only) time, thanks in part to a game against Lancashire in which he made 27 (the best of his career) and 17, albeit in a losing cause as Sussex were thrashed by an innings. In his main role he was again effective, taking 48 first-class wickets at 29.70, as well as picking up 19 in one-day cricket. In 1998 and 1999 Robinson also passed 40 wickets, but in 2000 his only double-figure List A score (15* against Lancashire) could not compensate for his being in and out of the County Championship side and managing only 16 first-class wickets.

Robinson's final full season was 2001, and it proved to be his most productive: he took 56 wickets at an excellent average of 19.33, topping the Division 2 Championship averages among those bowlers taking 20 or more wickets, while 29 scalps in List A games was also a personal best. Despite this, however, he was to play only one more first-class game, in June 2002 against Yorkshire. He did play a few one-day matches that season, and after a few second-team appearances the following year he retired from playing.

In October 2005, Robinson became professional cricket manager at Sussex, replacing Peter Moores who left to succeed Rod Marsh as director of the ECB National Academy.
