= Derbyshire County Cricket Club in 1961 =

1961 season of an English cricket team

Derbyshire County Cricket Club
1961 season
- Captain: Donald Carr
- County Championship: 7
- Most runs: Laurie Johnson
- Most wickets: Harold Rhodes

Derbyshire County Cricket Club in 1961 represents cricket season when the English club Derbyshire had been playing for ninety years. It was their fifty-seventh season in the County Championship and they won ten matches to finish seventh in the County Championship.

== 1961 season ==
Derbyshire played 28 games in the County Championship, and one match against Oxford University, one against the touring Australians and an extra match against Nottinghamshire. They won ten matches altogether Donald Carr was in his seventh season as captain. Laurie Johnson was top scorer and Harold Rhodes took most wickets with 101.

The only new member of the team was Bob Taylor, a future captain and international, who had played in the second XI in the previous year. He was brought in to keep wicket after George Dawkes suffered from knee problems.

=== Matches ===
List of matches
No.	Date	V	Result	Margin	Notes
1	26 Apr 1961	Nottinghamshire; Trent Bridge, Nottingham	Drawn		Not a county championship match
2	3 May 1961	Australians; Queen's Park, Chesterfield	Drawn		Only 22 overs played
3	10 May 1961	Kent; County Ground, Derby	Drawn		Sayer 5–48; HJ Rhodes 5–59
4	13 May 1961	Nottinghamshire; Trent Bridge, Nottingham	Won	3 wickets	Winfield 109; DB Carr 143
5	17 May 1961	Somerset; Recreation Ground, Bath	Won	3 wickets	Wright 102; DC Morgan 5–40
6	20 May 1961	Northamptonshire; County Ground, Northampton	Lost	129 runs	Allen 8–48 and 5–50; HJ Rhodes 5–48; E Smith 5–41
7	24 May 1961	Worcestershire; County Ground, Derby	Lost	Innings and 15 runs	Coldwell 5–44; Gifford 5–17
8	27 May 1961	Glamorgan; Queen's Park, Chesterfield	Lost	14 runs	IR Buxton 6–80
9	3 Jun 1961	Lancashire; Old Trafford, Manchester	Lost	109 runs	Grieves 139
10	7 Jun 1961	Sussex; County Ground, Derby	Drawn		IR Buxton 5–52; Thomson 5–54 and 6–46
11	10 Jun 1961	Essex; Hoffman's Sports and Social Club Ground, Chelmsford	Drawn		G Smith 148; HL Johnson 119; TJP Eyre 5–75
12	17 Jun 1961	Essex; Ind Coope Ground, Burton-on-Trent	Lost	181 runs	Knight 120; HL Jackson 5–30; Bailey 5–27
13	21 Jun 1961	Lancashire; Queen's Park, Chesterfield	Won	Innings and 141 runs	HL Jackson 6–15; TJP Eyre 5–40
14	24 Jun 1961	Oxford University; Park Road Ground, Buxton	Drawn		HJ Rhodes took a hattrick to finish Oxford's second innings
15	28 Jun 1961	Yorkshire; Bramall Lane, Sheffield	Drawn		Trueman 6–60 and 5–63
16	1 Jul 1961	Leicestershire; County Ground, Derby	Won	9 wickets	HL Jackson 5–53; Spencer 5–32
17	5 Jul 1961	Gloucestershire; Wagon Works Ground, Gloucester	Drawn		HL Johnson 122; A'Court 6–50; Cook 5–41
18	8 Jul 1961	Yorkshire; Queen's Park, Chesterfield	Lost	Innings and 18 runs	Stott 114
19	12 Jul 1961	Glamorgan; Cardiff Arms Park	Drawn		HJ Rhodes 5–80; Shepherd5-96
20	19 Jul 1961	Warwickshire; County Ground, Derby	Won	3 wickets	IR Buxton 5–41 and 5–63; Thompson 5–46 and 5–75
21	22 Jul 1961	Worcestershire; Chester Road North Ground, Kidderminster	Lost	185 runs	Headley 103; Coldwell 8–41
22	26 Jul 1961	Middlesex; Lord's Cricket Ground, St John's Wood	Won	7 wickets	Parfitt 113; HJ Rhodes 7–74
23	29 Jul 1961	Nottinghamshire; Rutland Recreation Ground, Ilkeston	Drawn		DB Carr 130
24	2 Aug 1961	Somerset; Queen's Park, Chesterfield	Won	6 wickets	HL Jackson 5–33; Palmer 6–76
25	5 Aug 1961	Northamptonshire; County Ground, Derby	Drawn		
26	9 Aug 1961	Leicestershire; Grace Road, Leicester	Won	136 runs	HL Johnson 116; Savage 5–81; HJ Rhodes 5–49
27	12 Aug 1961	Hampshire; County Ground, Derby	Lost	58 runs	Horton 141; Shackleton 6–90
28	19 Aug 1961	Surrey; Queen's Park, Chesterfield	Won	4 wickets	HL Jackson 6–40 and 5–68; Sydenham 5–102
29	23 Aug 1961	Warwickshire; Edgbaston, Birmingham	Drawn		Stewart 135; Wright 5–68; Bannister 6–30
30	26 Aug 1961	Sussex; Manor Sports Ground, Worthing	Won	65 runs	WF Oates 148; E Smith 5–76
31	30 Aug 1961	Hampshire; Dean Park, Bournemouth	Lost	140 runs	HL Johnson 112; Wassell 5–132; Shackleton 6–39

== Statistics ==
=== County Championship batting averages ===
Name	Matches	Inns	Runs	High score	Average	100s
HL Johnson	25	46	1594	122	37.95	4
DB Carr	26	47	1559	143	36.25	2
WF Oates	23	41	1259	148*	34.02	1
C Lee	28	53	1415	91	27.74	0
I Gibson	1	2	49	46	24.50	0
DC Morgan	26	45	888	83	22.76	0
GO Dawkes	11	18	342	50	21.37	0
IW Hall	24	45	899	71	20.43	0
IR Buxton	24	41	643	50*	17.86	0
TJP Eyre	8	12	97	33*	16.16	0
E Smith	20	34	432	48	14.89	0
HJ Rhodes	24	37	321	34	14.59	0
GA Beet	2	3	28	17	14.00	0
D Millner	12	24	334	80	13.91	0
R Swallow	6	11	132	34	12.00	0
RW Taylor	17	24	205	48	11.38	0
R Berry	8	10	42	17	7.00	0
GW Richardson	4	6	35	18	5.83	0
HL Jackson	19	21	46	11	3.06	0

=== County Championship bowling averages ===
Name	Balls	Runs	Wickets	BB	Average
HJ Rhodes	5582	2024	101	7–74	20.03
IR Buxton	4350	1691	79	6–80	21.40
HL Jackson	4696	1481	78	6–15	18.98
DC Morgan	4203	1744	62	5–40	28.12
E Smith	3543	1412	44	5–41	32.09
TJP Eyre	1358	682	29	5–40	23.51
DB Carr	1088	615	18	3–37	34.16
R Berry	1344	462	14	3–45	33.00
C Lee	684	262	11	2–9	23.81
GW Richardson	384	211	4	2–55	52.75
WF Oates	138	63	2	1–0	31.50
HL Johnson	24	24	1	1–0	24.00
GA Beet	48	42	1	1–42	42.00
D Millner	24	15	0		
R Swallow	6	0	0		
I Gibson	12	13	0		
IW Hall	18	5	0		

== Wicket Keepers ==
- GO Dawkes Catches 33, Stumping 1 (not in championship)
- Bob Taylor Catches 47, Stumping 6

== See also ==
- Derbyshire County Cricket Club seasons
- 1961 English cricket season
