= Derbyshire County Cricket Club in 1963 =

1963 season of an English cricket team

Derbyshire County Cricket Club seasons
1963 season
- Captain: Charles Lee
- County Championship: 17
- Gillette Cup: Quarter final
- Most runs: Charles Lee
- Most wickets: Harold Rhodes
- Most catches: Bob Taylor

Derbyshire County Cricket Club in 1963 was the cricket season when the English club Derbyshire had been playing for ninety-two years. It was their fifty-ninth season in the County Championship and they won two championship matches and lost fourteen to finish seventeenth in the County Championship. It was the first season in which the Gillette Cup was played, and Derbyshire reached the quarter-finals.

== 1963 season ==
Derbyshire played 28 games in the County Championship, one match against the Pakistani Eaglets, one against the touring West Indies and one match against Cambridge University. They won three first class matches, lost fifteen matches and drew thirteen matches. They won their first round match in the Gillette Cup, but lost in the quarter-final. Charles Lee was captain and scored most runs. Harold Rhodes took most wickets for the club.

There were several new players in the Derbyshire team. Brian Jackson made a large contribution with his bowling over six seasons. John Harvey played for another ten years and John Eyre for five. Roger de Ville appeared twice in the season and once in the following season.

== Matches ==
=== First Class ===
List of matches
No.	Date	V	Result	Margin	Notes
1	8 May 1963	Surrey; Kennington Oval	Lost	Innings and 6 runs	Edrich 125
2	11 May 1963	Gloucestershire; County Ground, Derby	Lost	4 wickets	Brown 6–48 and 7–48
3	15 May 1963	Somerset; Ind Coope Ground, Burton-on-Trent	Lost	Innings and 80 runs	Wright 151
4	18 May 1963	Worcestershire; Queen's Park, Chesterfield	Drawn		Coldwell 6–43
5	25 May 1963	Glamorgan; St Helen's, Swansea	Drawn		C Lee 104; Oates 99; Pressdee 6–58
6	29 May 1963	Essex; Gidea Park Sports Ground, Romford	Lost	80 runs	Knight 5–46
7	1 Jun 1963	Warwickshire; Edgbaston, Birmingham	Lost	10 wickets	Horner 102; Hitchcock 106; Barber 6–74
8	5 Jun 1963	Northamptonshire; County Ground, Derby	Lost	4 wickets	IW Hall 136; HL Jackson 6–69
9	8 Jun 1963	Yorkshire; Queen's Park, Chesterfield	Lost	Innings and 56 runs	Padgett 142; Sharpe 136; Nicholson 6–36
10	15 Jun 1963	Lancashire; Aigburth, Liverpool	Drawn		Statham 5–45
11	19 Jun 1963	Glamorgan; Queen's Park, Chesterfield	Lost	7 wickets	Shepherd 7–49
12	22 Jun 1963	Leicestershire; County Ground, Derby	Drawn		
13	29 Jun 1963	Cambridge University; Ind Coope Ground, Burton-on-Trent	Drawn		Hutton 8–50
14	3 Jul 1963	Middlesex; Rutland Recreation Ground, Ilkeston	Drawn		Moss 5–47
15	6 Jul 1963	Pakistan Eaglets; County Ground, Derby	Won	8 wickets	DC Morgan 113; Iqbal 5–103; AB Jackson 7–56
16	13 Jul 1963	Worcestershire; County Ground, New Road, Worcester	Lost	101 runs	Graveney 100; Flavell 6–46; HL Jackson 5–53
17	17 Jul 1963	West Indies; Queen's Park, Chesterfield	Lost	135 runs	
18	20 Jul 1963	Nottinghamshire; Rutland Recreation Ground, Ilkeston	Drawn		Hill 134
19	24 Jul 1963	Sussex; Central Recreation Ground, Hastings	Won	13 runs	Snow 6–52; Thomson 7–31; HJ Rhodes 6–22
20	27 Jul 1963	Northamptonshire; County Ground, Northampton	Lost	Innings and 53 runs	Ramsamooj 132; Larter 5–62
21	31 Jul 1963	Sussex; Queen's Park, Chesterfield	Drawn		DB Carr 136
22	3 Aug 1963	Warwickshire; County Ground, Derby	Lost	9 wickets	M Smith 144; Edmonds 5–40
23	7 Aug 1963	Yorkshire; Headingley, Leeds	Lost	7 wickets	
24	10 Aug 1963	Somerset; Clarence Park, Weston-super-Mare	Lost	192 runs	Doughty 6–58 and 5–44
25	14 Aug 1963	Kent; Cheriton Road Sports Ground, Folkestone	Drawn		Nicholls 211; Harvey 103
26	17 Aug 1963	Lancashire; Park Road Ground, Buxton	Drawn		Grieves 114; Statham 6–28
27	21 Aug 1963	Surrey; County Ground, Derby	Drawn		Sydenham 5–31 and 6–47
28	24 Aug 1963	Hampshire; Queen's Park, Chesterfield	Won	144 runs	HJ Rhodes 5–41
29	28 Aug 1963	Nottinghamshire; Trent Bridge, Nottingham	Lost	8 wickets	Bolus 136; Corran 5–55
30	31 Aug 1963	Leicestershire; Grace Road, Leicester	Drawn		
31	4 Sep 1963	Middlesex; Lord's Cricket Ground, St John's Wood	Drawn		

=== Gillette Cup ===
List of matches
No.	Date	V	Result	Margin	Notes
1st round	22 May 1963	Hampshire; Dean Park, Bournemouth	Won	6 runs	
Quarter final	12 Jun 1963	Lancashire; Old Trafford, Manchester	Lost	5 wickets	

== Statistics ==
=== Competition batting averages ===
Name	County Championship						Gillette Cup					
Name	M	I	Runs	HS	Ave	100	M	I	Runs	HS	Ave	100
DB Carr	4	8	358	136	44.75	1	1	1	11	11	11.00	0
DC Morgan	23	38	877	82	25.79	0	1	1	59	59*		0
C Lee	26	45	1147	104	25.48	1	1	1	0	0	0.00	0
WF Oates	19	32	809	99	25.28	0	2	2	15	9	7.50	0
JF Harvey	8	12	292	103	24.33	1						
IR Buxton	28	49	995	74*	22.11	0	2	2	23	21	11.50	0
IW Hall	22	40	739	136	18.47	1	2	2	92	61	46.00	0
HL Johnson	27	48	803	72	18.25	0	2	2	33	32	16.50	0
E Smith	25	42	595	49	16.08	0	2	2	30	28	15.00	0
D Millner	10	17	203	46	12.68	0	1	1	29	29	29.00	0
R Swallow	7	14	156	61	12.00	0						
RT de Ville	2	4	24	17	12.00	0						
AB Jackson	21	28	142	21	11.83	0	1	1	2	2	2.00	0
RW Taylor	28	44	387	54	9.92	0	2	2	16	10	8.00	0
HL Jackson	23	36	180	25	8.57	0	2	2	3	2	3.00	0
TJP Eyre	9	16	131	19	8.18	0	1	1	27	27	27.00	0
HJ Rhodes	21	30	207	38*	7.96	0	1	1	6	6*		0
GW Richardson	3	5	28	14	5.60	0	1	1	39	39	39.00	0
JR Eyre	2	1	0	0	0.00	0						

Leading first-class batsmen for Derbyshire by runs scored
Name	Mat	Inns	Runs	HS	Ave	100
C Lee	28	48	1202	104	25.04	1
IR Buxton	31	55	1084	74*	21.68	0
DC Morgan	25	41	1039	113*	28.86	1
WF Oates	22	38	869	99	23.48	0
HL Johnson	29	51	848	72	18.04	0

Leading ListA batsmen for Derbyshire by runs scored
Name	Mat	Inns	Runs	HS	Ave	100
IW Hall	2	2	92	61	46.00	0
DC Morgan	1	1	59	59*		0
GW Richardson	1	1	39	39	39.00	0
HL Johnson	2	2	33	32	16.50	0
D Millner	1	1	29	29	29.00	0

=== Competition bowling averages ===
Name	County Championship					Gillette Cup				
Name	Balls	Runs	Wkts	Best	Ave	Balls	Runs	Wkts	Best	Ave
HL Jackson	4365	1413	63	6–66	22.42	162	46	2	1–22	23.00
HJ Rhodes	3732	1490	62	6–22	24.03	70	33	2	2–33	16.50
AB Jackson	3472	1468	54	4–24	27.18	48	24	0		
DC Morgan	3101	1284	46	4–46	27.91	90	49	2	2–49	24.50
E Smith	3108	1452	32	4–64	45.37	165	106	2	1–46	53.00
IR Buxton	2106	932	19	3–54	49.05	42	42	0		
GW Richardson	444	172	7	3–35	24.57	90	64	2	2–64	32.00
TJP Eyre	598	352	5	2–56	70.40	18	16	1	1–16	16.00
RT de Ville	156	141	2	2–47	70.50					
DB Carr	95	57	1	1–5	57.00					
HL Johnson	50	27	1	1–2	27.00					
C Lee	48	36	0							
WF Oates	54	36	0							
JR Eyre	36	33	0							
D Millner	12	12	0							

Leading first class bowlers for Derbyshire by wickets taken
Name	Balls	Runs	Wkts	BBI	Ave
HJ Rhodes	4420	1786	75	6–22	23.81
AB Jackson	4039	1696	71	7–56	23.88
HL Jackson	4665	1515	69	6–66	21.95
DC Morgan	3287	1392	48	4–46	29.00
E Smith	3405	1636	38	4–64	43.05

Leading ListA bowlers for Derbyshire by wickets taken
Name	Balls	Runs	Wkts	BBI	Ave
HJ Rhodes	70	33	2	2–33	16.50
HL Jackson	162	46	2	1–22	23.00
DC Morgan	90	49	2	2–49	24.50
GW Richardson	90	64	2	2–64	32.00
E Smith	165	106	2	1–46	53.00

=== Wicket Keeping ===
- Bob Taylor

County Championship Catches 74, Stumping 2
Gillette Cup Catches 3, Stumping 0

== See also ==
- Derbyshire County Cricket Club seasons
- 1963 English cricket season
