= Derbyshire County Cricket Club in 1962 =

1962 season of an English cricket team

Derbyshire County Cricket Club seasons
1962 season
- Captain: Donald Carr
- County Championship: 7
- Most runs: Laurie Johnson
- Most wickets: Les Jackson
- Most catches: Bob Taylor

Derbyshire County Cricket Club in 1962 was the cricket season when the English club Derbyshire had been playing for ninety-one years. It was their fifty-eighth season in the County Championship and they won 9 championship matches and lost six to finish seventh in the County Championship.

== 1962 season ==
Derbyshire played 28 games in the County Championship, one match against the touring Pakistinis and one match against Oxford University. They won nine matches, lost six matches and drew fifteen matches. Donald Carr was in his eighth year as captain. Laurie Johnson was top scorer and Les Jackson took most wickets for the club.

There were no new players in the Derbyshire team.

=== Matches ===
List of matches
No.	Date	V	Result	Margin	Notes
1	5 May 1962	Lancashire; County Ground, Derby	Drawn		C Lee 137; IR Buxton 108
2	12 May 1962	Essex; Valentine's Park, Ilford	Won	7 wickets	HL Jackson 6–25 and 5–65
3	16 May 1962	Sussex; Queen's Park, Chesterfield	Drawn		
4	19 May 1962	Nottinghamshire; Trent Bridge, Nottingham	Drawn		Davison 7–28
5	23 May 1962	Gloucestershire; County Ground, Derby	Won	4 wickets	Nicholls 144;
6	26 May 1962	Kent; Bat and Ball Ground, Gravesend	Drawn		
7	30 May 1962	Oxford University; The University Parks, Oxford	Won	10 wickets	Baig 103; R Swallow 115; HJ Rhodes 5–41
8	2 Jun 1962	Lancashire; Old Trafford, Manchester	Drawn		DC Morgan 5–72
9	6 Jun 1962	Somerset; Imperial Athletic Ground, Bristol	Drawn		WF Oates 101; Atkinson 105 and 6–113; HL Johnson 108; HJ Rhodes 5–73
10	9 Jun 1962	Leicestershire; County Ground, Derby	Won	165 runs	DB Carr 110; Watson 142; HL Jackson 6–26 and 7–47
11	13 Jun 1962	Yorkshire; The Circle, Hull	Lost	Innings and 31 runs	Stott 145
12	16 Jun 1962	Glamorgan; Queen's Park, Chesterfield	Won	6 wickets	Shepherd 5–41
13	20 Jun 1962	Essex; County Ground, Derby	Won	5 wickets	HL Jackson 7–35
14	23 Jun 1962	Yorkshire; Queen's Park, Chesterfield	Drawn		E Smith 5–39
15	27 Jun 1962	Sussex; Manor Sports Ground, Worthing	Drawn		HL Johnson 114; Bell 5–92
16	30 Jun 1962	Hampshire; County Ground, Derby	Lost	5 wickets	Ingleby-Mackenzie 111
17	7 Jul 1962	Hampshire; United Services Recreation Ground, Portsmouth	Drawn		Gray 213; DC Morgan 112; Shackleton 5–112
18	11 Jul 1962	Northamptonshire; County Ground, Northampton	Lost	71 runs	E Smith 5–39; Allen 5–41
19	14 Jul 1962	Pakistan; Ind Coope Ground, Burton-on-Trent	Drawn		
20	21 Jul 1962	Northamptonshire; Rutland Recreation Ground, Ilkeston	Drawn		
21	25 Jul 1962	Northamptonshire; Park Road Ground, Buxton	Won	7 wickets	Milburn 102; DC Morgan 6–13; Larter 5–67
22	28 Jul 1962	Worcestershire; Tipton Road, Dudley	Lost	5 wickets	Coldwell 8–64
23	1 Aug 1962	Warwickshire; Queen's Park, Chesterfield	Drawn		Hitchcock 153; M Smith 105
24	4 Aug 1962	Leicestershire; Grace Road, Leicester	Drawn		HL Johnson 154
25	8 Aug 1962	Surrey; Kennington Oval	Lost	5 wickets	Lock 6–41; DC Morgan 6–32
26	11 Aug 1962	Warwickshire; Edgbaston, Birmingham	Drawn		M Smith 148
27	15 Aug 1962	Worcestershire; Queen's Park, Chesterfield	Drawn		Rumsey 7–50; HJ Rhodes 6–30
28	18 Aug 1962	Glamorgan; St Helen's, Swansea	Won	204 runs	Wheatley 5–52; Shepherd 5–60
29	22 Aug 1962	Somerset; County Ground, Derby	Lost	41 runs	HJ Rhodes 5–45 and 5–19; Alley 5–53; HL Jackson 5–20
30	25 Aug 1962	Middlesex; Queen's Park, Chesterfield	Won	8 wickets	HJ Rhodes 5–58; Titmus 6–86

== Statistics ==
=== County Championship batting averages ===
Name	Matches	Inns	Runs	High score	Average	100s
DC Morgan	27	44	1468	124	45.87	3
C Lee	23	41	1481	137	38.97	1
IR Buxton	28	44	1092	108*	34.12	1
HL Johnson	28	50	1581	154	32.93	3
WF Oates	24	42	1121	101	27.34	1
IW Hall	27	47	1094	87	26.68	0
E Smith	23	31	573	90	23.87	0
DB Carr	23	43	923	110	23.07	1
R Swallow	11	19	391	64	20.57	0
GW Richardson	12	14	199	42	18.09	0
TJP Eyre	7	7	66	19*	16.50	0
HJ Rhodes	18	17	89	18*	14.83	0
RW Taylor	28	35	290	44	10.74	0
HL Jackson	27	23	97	13	5.10	0
R Berry	2	3	7	4	3.50	0

Leading first-class batsmen for Derbyshire by runs scored
Name	Mat	Inns	Runs	HS	Ave	100
HL Johnson	30	53	1757	154	33.15	3
DC Morgan	29	47	1517	124	32.28	3
C Lee	25	43	1503	137	34.95	1
IW Hall	29	50	1226	87	24.52	0
WF Oates	26	46	1175	101	25.54	1

=== County Championship bowling averages ===
Name	Balls	Runs	Wickets	BB	Average
HL Jackson	5915	1944	99	7–35	19.63
DC Morgan	4712	1876	73	6–13	25.69
HJ Rhodes	3620	1244	62	6–30	20.06
E Smith	3494	1258	55	5–39	22.87
IR Buxton	3092	1355	42	4–57	32.26
GW Richardson	1325	726	18	3–41	40.33
TJP Eyre	1047	571	15	3–53	38.06
DB Carr	690	416	5	2–14	83.20
R Berry	252	115	3	2–18	38.33
C Lee	216	116	3	2–28	38.66
WF Oates	372	219	1	1–20	219.00
HL Johnson	27	26	0		
IW Hall	23	14	0		
R Swallow	18	8	0		

Leading first class bowlers for Derbyshire by wickets taken
Name	Balls	Runs	Wkts	BBI	Ave
HL Jackson	6107	2012	105	7–35	19.16
DC Morgan	5030	1987	76	6–13	26.14
HJ Rhodes	3926	1321	68	6–30	19.43
E Smith	4015	1405	62	5–39	22.66
IR Buxton	3318	1446	46	4–57	31.43

=== Wicket Keeping ===
- Bob Taylor Catches 77, Stumping 3
- Ian Hall Catches 2

== See also ==
- Derbyshire County Cricket Club seasons
- 1962 English cricket season
