= Derbyshire County Cricket Club in 1960 =

1960 season of an English cricket team

Derbyshire County Cricket Club seasons
1960 season
- Captain: Donald Carr
- County Championship: 5
- Most runs: Laurie Johnson
- Most wickets: Les Jackson
- Most catches: George Dawkes

Derbyshire County Cricket Club in 1960 was the cricket season when the English club Derbyshire had been playing for eighty nine years. It was their fifty-sixth season in the County Championship and they won ten matches and lost ten to finish eighth in the County Championship.

== 1960 season ==
Derbyshire played 28 games in the County Championship, one match against the touring South Africans, one match against Oxford University, and an extra match against Northamptonshire. They won ten matches, lost ten matches and drew eleven matches. Donald Carr was in his sixth year as captain. Laurie Johnson was top scorer and Les Jackson took most wickets for the club.

David Millner was the only player to make his first class debut in the Derbyshire team.

=== Matches ===
List of matches
No.	Date	V	Result	Margin	Notes
1	30 April 1960	Northamptonshire; Rutland Recreation Ground, Ilkeston	Lost	5 wickets	Not County Championship match
2	7 May 1960	South Africans; County Ground, Derby	Lost	Innings and 24 runs	Adcock 6-44
3	11 May 1960	Middlesex; Ind Coope Ground, Burton-on-Trent	Drawn		HL Jackson 8-44; Moss 7-42
4	14 May 1960	Somerset; County Ground, Taunton	Won	Innings and 68 runs	HL Jackson 6-23
5	18 May 1960	Glamorgan; Stradey Park, Llanelli	Lost	119 runs	HL Jackson 6-52; McConnon 5-50 and 6-51
6	21 May 1960	Warwickshire; Queen's Park, Chesterfield	Won	Innings and 109 runs	C Lee 107; GW Richardson 6-46 and 5-35; Hitchcock 6-75
7	25 May 1960	Oxford University; The University Parks, Oxford	Lost	82 runs	Corran 6-27
8	28 May 1960	Warwickshire; Griff and Coton Ground, Nuneaton	Lost	13 runs	C Lee 126;DB Carr137; E Smith 5-126; Hitchcock 6-75
9	1 June 1960	Gloucestershire; Queen's Park, Chesterfield	Lost	Innings and 51 runs	Pugh 137; Graveney 135
10	4 June 1960	Northamptonshire; County Ground, Derby	Drawn		HL Jackson 5-30
11	8 June 1960	Yorkshire; The Circle, Hull	Lost	241 runs	DC Morgan 7-38; D Wilson 6-34
12	11 June 1960	Sussex; County Ground, Hove	Drawn		
13	15 June 1960	Lancashire; Queen's Park, Chesterfield	Lost	222 runs	HL Jackson 6-36; Statham 5-29; R Berry 5-56; Barber 7-35
14	18 June 1960	Worcestershire; County Ground, Derby	Won	8 wickets	
15	25 June 1960	Yorkshire; Queen's Park, Chesterfield	Lost	58 runs	Close 6-59; Wilson 5-30
16	29 June 1960	Essex; County Ground, Derby	Drawn		HL Johnson 130
17	2 July 1960	Leicestershire; Bath Grounds, Ashby-de-la-Zouch	Drawn		DB Carr 162; DC Morgan 5-43
18	9 July 1960	Hampshire; County Ground, Southampton	Drawn		Sainsbury 6-54; HJ Rhodes 5-61
19	13 July 1960	Lancashire; Old Trafford, Manchester	Won	60 runs	HL Johnson 113; Grieves 102; Higgs 5-48; HJ Rhodes 5-18
20	16 July 1960	Leicestershire; County Ground, Derby	Won	Innings and 41 runs	HL Johnson 109; HJ Rhodes 5-35; HL Jackson 5-34
21	20 July 1960	Surrey; Kennington Oval	Drawn		Gibson 7-26; HL Jackson 7-33
22	23 July 1960	Nottinghamshire; Rutland Recreation Ground, Ilkeston	Won	116 runs	Atkinson 6-61; HL Jackson 7-45
23	27 July 1960	Somerset; Queen's Park, Chesterfield	Drawn		Langford 6-79
24	30 July 1960	Northamptonshire; County Ground, Northampton	Lost		Atkinson 6-61; R Berry 6-100
25	3 August 1960	Kent; St Lawrence Ground, Canterbury	Lost	190 runs	Halfyard 6-36; Dixon 6-36
26	6 August 1960	Essex; County Ground, Leyton	Won	46 runs	Bailey 5-72; Ralph 5-59; HL Jackson 5-36; Greensmith 5-47
27	13 August 1960	Nottinghamshire; Trent Bridge, Nottingham	Won	9 wickets	R Berry 5-68; HL Jackson 6-51
28	17 August 1960	Hampshire; County Ground, Derby	Won	6 wickets	HL Jackson 5-16 and 5-32
29	20 August 1960	Glamorgan; Queen's Park, Chesterfield	Drawn		HL Johnson 140; Shepherd 7-33
30	24 August 1960	Worcestershire; County Ground, New Road, Worcester	Drawn		Flavell 5-37
31	27 August 1960	Sussex; Park Road Ground, Buxton	Drawn		

== Statistics ==
=== County Championship batting averages ===
Name	Matches	Inns	Runs	High score	Average	100s
HL Johnson	28	50	1719	140	39.06	4
DB Carr	22	38	1111	162*	30.02	2
C Lee	26	44	1194	126	27.76	2
IW Hall	26	46	1090	65	24.77	0
R Swallow	9	17	412	68	24.23	0
GO Dawkes	28	47	860	68*	21.50	0
A Hamer	7	12	248	71	20.66	0
JM Kelly	1	2	41	28	20.50	0
DC Morgan	24	40	573	75	16.85	0
E Smith	9	14	180	52	15.00	0
JD Short	6	10	146	86	14.60	0
DJ Green	5	8	109	37	13.62	0
IR Buxton	10	16	176	49*	12.57	0
TJP Eyre	12	18	199	56	12.43	0
D Millner	7	13	150	63	11.53	0
GW Richardson	11	20	193	51	11.35	0
WF Oates	7	10	97	22	9.70	0
R Berry	25	33	186	40	9.30	0
HJ Rhodes	18	22	134	25*	7.88	0
HL Jackson	27	32	147	27	7.00	0

G Wyatt kept wicket against Oxford University

Leading first-class batsmen for Derbyshire by runs scored
Name	Mat	Inns	Runs	HS	Ave	100
HL Johnson	31	56	1872	140	33.42	4
C Lee	31	50	1304	126	26.08	2
DB Carr	25	44	1187	162*	26.97	2
IW Hall	28	50	1177	65	23.54	0
GO Dawkes	30	51	964	68*	18.90	0

=== County Championship bowling averages ===
Name	Balls	Runs	Wickets	BB	Average
HL Jackson	5885	1965	146	8-44	13.45
DC Morgan	3477	1278	66	7-38	19.36
HJ Rhodes	3272	1166	63	5-18	18.50
R Berry	3751	1343	49	6-100	27.40
TJP Eyre	1415	671	35	4-14	19.17
GW Richardson	1554	699	32	6-46	21.84
E Smith	1435	614	18	5-126	34.11
DB Carr	723	324	11	3-32	29.45
IR Buxton	701	249	8	2-9	31.12
C Lee	264	106	4	2-25	26.50
WF Oates	48	27	0		
HL Johnson	24	26	0		
JD Short	18	11	0		
GO Dawkes	6	5	0		

Leading first class bowlers for Derbyshire by wickets taken
Name	Balls	Runs	Wkts	BBI	Ave
HL Jackson	6113	2034	150	8-44	13.56
HJ Rhodes	3832	1349	78	5-18	17.29
DC Morgan	3477	1278	66	7-38	19.36
R Berry	4441	1557	60	6-100	25.95
TJP Eyre	1415	671	35	4-14	19.17

=== Wicket Keeping ===
- George Dawkes Catches 69, Stumping 4
- G Wyatt Catches 2

== See also ==
- Derbyshire County Cricket Club seasons
- 1960 English cricket season
