= Derbyshire County Cricket Club in 1959 =

1959 season of an English cricket team

Derbyshire County Cricket Club
1959 season
- Captain: Donald Carr
- County Championship: 7
- Most runs: Donald Carr
- Most wickets: Les Jackson

Derbyshire County Cricket Club in 1959 represents the cricket season when the English club Derbyshire had been playing eighty-eight years. It was their fifty-fifth season in the County Championship and they won thirteen matches to finish seventh in the County Championship.

== 1959 season ==
Derbyshire played 28 games in the County Championship, one match against Cambridge University, and one against the touring Indians . Despite winning thirteen matches altogether, they ended seventh in the County Championship. Donald Carr was in his fifth season as captain and was top scorer. His 2165 runs was a record for most runs in a season for Derbyshire and he scored two centuries in a match against Kent. He was also Wisden Cricketer of the Year. Les Jackson took most wickets with 117 and achieved 9 for 17 against Cambridge University. Harold Rhodes played for England during the season.

The team included a considerable amount of fresh blood with Bob Berry Ian Buxton, Peter Eyre, Ian Hall, William Oates and William Richardson, all of whom had sustained careers with Derbyshire.

=== Matches ===
List of matches
No.	Date	V	Result	Margin	Notes
1	29 Apr 1959	Cambridge University; FP Fenner's Ground, Cambridge	Won	Innings and 92 runs	Douglas-Pennant 5-76; HL Jackson 9-17
2	9 May 1959	Northamptonshire; County Ground, Derby	Won	4 wickets	Subba Row 127; HJ Rhodes 5-65; HL Jackson 5-41
3	13 May 1959	Warwickshire; Courtaulds Ground, Coventry	Won	167 runs	DB Carr 143; Wheatley 5-93; HL Jackson 6-53
4	16 May 1959	Leicestershire; Grace Road, Leicester	Drawn		Hallam 200; Watson 101*; Spencer 5-69; R Smith 5-81
5	20 May 1959	Gloucestershire; County Ground, Derby	Lost	48 runs	Young 142
6	23 May 1959	Worcestershire; Queen's Park, Chesterfield	Won	9 wickets	Outschoon 112; HL Jackson 5-38;
7	27 May 1959	Glamorgan; St Helen's, Swansea	Lost	3 wickets	Parkhouse 154
8	30 May 1959	Middlesex; Lord's Cricket Ground, St John's Wood	Won	6 wickets	HL Jackson 5-42
9	6 Jun 1959	Yorkshire; Bramall Lane, Sheffield	Drawn		HL Jackson 5-70; Platt 6-72
10	10 Jun 1959	Kent > Queen's Park, Chesterfield	Won	Innings and 21 runs	GW Richardson 8-64; Halfyard 7-89; HL Jackson 5-38
11	13 Jun 1959	Lancashire; County Ground, Derby	Won	7 wickets	HL Jackson 6-36
12	17 Jun 1959	Surrey; Kennington Oval	Drawn		DC Morgan 5-67
13	20 Jun 1959	Nottinghamshire; Trent Bridge, Nottingham	Won	4 wickets	JM Kelly 113; DC Morgan 5-45
14	24 Jun 1959	Gloucestershire; Ashley Down Ground, Bristol	Lost	Innings and 45 runs	E Smith 5-70
15	27 Jun 1959	Indians Queen's Park, Chesterfield	Drawn		Apte 165
16	4 Jul 1959	Yorkshire; Queen's Park, Chesterfield	Lost	6 wickets	K Taylor 144
17	11 Jul 1959	Lancashire; Old Trafford, Manchester	Drawn		Marner 137; C Lee 109; DB Carr 119
18	15 Jul 1959	Somerset; Park Road Ground, Buxton	Drawn		Wright 112; Greetham 104
19	18 Jul 1959	Warwickshire; Ind Coope Ground, Burton-on-Trent	Lost	26 runs	M Smith 142; HL Jackson 7-35 and 5-80
20	25 Jul 1959	Sussex; Rutland Recreation Ground, Ilkeston	Drawn		Parks 130; Marlar 6-57
21	29 Jul 1959	Glamorgan; Queen's Park, Chesterfield	Drawn		Wooler 7-41; IR Buxton 5-62
22	1 Aug 1959	Leicestershire; County Ground, Derby	Drawn		Watson 150; DB Carr 109
23	5 Aug 1959	Kent; St Lawrence Ground, Canterbury	Won	99 runs	DB Carr 156* and 109; Pettiford 5-33; GW Richardson 7-31
24	8 Aug 1959	Hampshire; County Ground, Derby	Won	6 wickets	IW Hall 113; Shaekleton 7-86; E Smith 5-32
25	12 Aug 1959	Essex; Queen's Park, Chesterfield	Drawn		Insole 155; Knight 5-44
26	15 Aug 1959	Worcestershire; County Ground, New Road, Worcester	Won	137 runs	Aldridge 5-55; HL Jackson 5-34 and 5-26
27	19 Aug 1959	Essex; Vista Road Recreation Ground, Clacton-on-Sea	Lost	7 wickets	Barker 128*; HL Jackson 6-47
28	22 Aug 1959	Sussex; Manor Sports Ground, Worthing	Won	5 wickets	Lenham 104; Parks 113; A Hamer 118;E Smith6-44
29	26 Aug 1959	Nottinghamshire; County Ground, Derby	Won	119 runs	Hill 122; Cotton 5-55
30	29 Aug 1959	Hampshire; Dean Park, Bournemouth	Drawn		Horton 119

== Statistics ==
=== County Championship batting averages ===
Name	Matches	Inns	Runs	High score	Average	100s
DB Carr	27	49	2092	156*	49.80	5
A Hamer	28	53	1842	118	36.84	1
HL Johnson	28	50	1360	97	34.00	0
IW Hall	12	19	572	113	30.10	1
C Lee	26	49	1316	109	27.41	1
JM Kelly	14	26	620	113*	25.83	1
DC Morgan	28	52	1101	75	24.46	0
IR Buxton	8	11	216	79	21.60	0
GW Richardson	19	31	512	91	20.48	0
GO Dawkes	28	45	804	68	20.10	0
WF Oates	5	9	134	56	16.75	0
HJ Rhodes	18	21	208	44*	13.86	0
E Smith	28	39	349	43	12.46	0
HL Jackson	26	29	178	32	9.36	0
R Berry	12	14	35	11*	5.00	0
TJP Eyre	1	1	0	0	0.00	0

Additionally Ray Swallow played in the match against the touring Indians.

=== County Championship bowling averages ===
Name	Balls	Runs	Wickets	BB	Average
HL Jackson	6056	2114	117	7-35	18.06
E Smith	4224	2023	71	6-44	28.49
HJ Rhodes	3294	1484	60	5-65	24.73
DC Morgan	4223	1990	55	5-45	36.18
GW Richardson	2609	1373	54	8-54	25.42
IR Buxton	954	468	20	5-62	23.40
DB Carr	1237	734	18	3-58	40.77
R Berry	1492	645	15	3-12	43.00
TJP Eyre	150	96	1	1-75	96.00
C Lee	95	56	1	1-4	56.00
A Hamer	18	12	1	1-0	12.00
HL Johnson	18	10	0		
IW Hall	6	0	0		
GO Dawkes	1	0	0		

== Wicket Keepers ==
- GO Dawkes Catches 57, Stumping 5

== See also ==
- Derbyshire County Cricket Club seasons
- 1959 English cricket season
