= 1870 English cricket season =

Cricket season review

The 1870 English cricket season was the seventh since the legalisation of overarm bowling. It was in many ways a bridge between two eras of the game and, in a summer comparable for hot and dry weather to 1887, 1911, 1976 or 1995, saw W.G. Grace for the second of three successive years establish a record run aggregate, late-blooming slow bowler James Southerton become the first bowler to take 200 first-class wickets in a season and the first use of the heavy roller at Lord's. Although the heavy roller had been patented several decades earlier, its use was never seriously considered by MCC management despite many protests over the danger posed by the Lord's pitch where extremely frequent “shooters” alternated with balls that “flew” over the batsman's head. These dangerous pitches were viewed as a symbol of virility by many amateur batsmen, however; though when remembering one of W.G.’s finest innings – 66 on one of the roughest Lord’s pitches against a very strong Yorkshire attack against Yorkshire – fast bowlers Freeman and Emmett wondered how the champion was not maimed or killed outright.

An unfortunate accident to George Summers which led to his death from head injuries four days after being hit by a sharply rising ball from John Platts that had struck a loose pebble showed that in its first year the heavy roller had not radically altered the Lord’s pitch; though it was to do so from the following season

A number of thrilling finishes occurred, most famously the University Match where a hat-trick by Frank Cobden gave Cambridge the match when Oxford looked certain to win. (Note: Some eleven-a-side matches played from 1772 to 1863 have been rated "first-class" by certain sources. However, the term only came into common use around 1864, when overarm bowling was legalised. It was formally defined as a standard by a meeting at Lord's, in May 1894, of Marylebone Cricket Club (MCC) and the county clubs which were then competing in the County Championship. The ruling was effective from the beginning of the 1895 season, but pre-1895 matches of the same standard have no official definition of status because the ruling is not retrospective. Matches of a similar standard since the beginning of the 1864 season are generally considered to have an unofficial first-class status. Pre-1864 matches which are included in the ACS' "Important Match Guide" may generally be regarded as top-class or, at least, historically significant. For further information, see First-class cricket.)

== Playing record (by county) ==
County	Played	Won	Lost	Drawn
Gloucestershire	2	2	0	0
Hampshire	2	0	2	0
Kent	8	2	6	0
Lancashire	4	3	1	0
Middlesex	2	1	1	0
Nottinghamshire	6	3	2	1
Surrey	14	5	9	0
Sussex	4	2	2	0
Yorkshire	6	5	0	1
^{[a]}

== Leading batsmen (qualification 15 innings) ==
1870 English season leading batsmen
Name	Team	Matches	Innings	Not outs	Runs	Highest score	Average	100s	50s
WG Grace	Gloucestershire; Marylebone Cricket Club (MCC)	21	38	5	1808	215	54.78	5	9
Richard Daft	Nottinghamshire	9	15	4	565	117	51.36	1	3
Isaac Walker	Marylebone Cricket Club (MCC); Middlesex	13	25	3	820	179	37.27	1	4
William Yardley	Cambridge University; Kent; Marylebone Cricket Club (MCC)	13	25	1	643	100	26.79	1	4
Cuthbert Ottaway	Kent; Cambridge University	9	18	2	427	69	26.68	0	4

== Leading bowlers (qualification 800 balls) ==
1870 English season leading bowlers
Name	Team	Balls bowled	Runs conceded	Wickets taken	Average	Best bowling	5 wickets in innings	10 wickets in match
George Freeman	Yorkshire	1930	484	68	7.11	8/43	9	4
Frank Farrands	Marylebone Cricket Club (MCC)	856	281	28	10.03	6/23	4	2
Jem Shaw	Nottinghamshire	3302	990	97	10.20	7/30	11	4
Walter Anstead	Surrey	1063	424	39	10.87	6/27	4	1
Edgar Willsher	Kent	3675	1062	84	12.64	7/22	9	2

== Events ==
- 2–4 June: Gloucestershire County Cricket Club played its initial first-class match v. Surrey at Durdham Downs, near Bristol.
- 15 June: George Summers, during the MCC v Nottinghamshire match at Lord's, is hit on the temple and dies four days later. It is generally thought that Summers should have been taken to hospital rather than ride a bumpy train to Nottingham.
- 27, 28 June: "Cobden's Match". William Yardley scores the first century in the University Match, which Cambridge won by two runs after a hat-trick by Cobden when Oxford needed only three runs
- 29 August: James Southerton becomes the first bowler to take 200 wickets in an English season when he takes his first wicket in Surrey's last match against Yorkshire
- 4 November: Formation of Derbyshire County Cricket Club at a meeting in the Guildhall, Derby.

== Labels ==
^{a} Cambridgeshire, though still regarded in 1870 as first-class, played no inter-county matches

== Bibliography ==
- ACS (1981). A Guide to Important Cricket Matches Played in the British Isles 1709–1863. Nottingham: ACS. OCLC 85045528.
- ACS (1982). A Guide to First-class Cricket Matches Played in the British Isles. Nottingham: ACS. OCLC 10586869.
- Warner, Pelham (1946). Lords: 1787–1945. London: Harrap. OCLC 877106024.

== Annual reviews ==
- John Lillywhite's Cricketer's Companion (Green Lilly), Lillywhite, 1871
- Wisden Cricketers' Almanack, 1871
