= David Millner =

English cricketer (born 1938)

Personal information
- Full name: David Millner
- Born: 24 July 1938 (age 88); Dove Holes, Derbyshire, England
- Batting: Right-handed
- Bowling: Right-arm off-break

Domestic team information
- Years: Team
- 1960–1964: Derbyshire
- FC debut: 18 June 1960 Derbyshire v Worcestershire
- Last FC: 24 August 1953 Derbyshire v Hampshire
- LA debut: 12 June 1963 Derbyshire v Lancashire
- Last LA: 2 May 1964 Derbyshire v Northamptonshire

Career statistics
Competition	First-class	List A
Matches	31	2
Runs scored	701	33
Batting average	12.74	16.50
100s/50s	0/2	0/0
Top score	80	29
Catches/stumpings	6/–	0/–
- Source: CricketArchive, November 2011

David Millner (born 24 July 1938) is a former English cricketer who played first-class cricket for Derbyshire between 1960 and 1964.

Millner was born in Dove Holes, Derbyshire. He played his first game for Derbyshire Club and Ground in 1954 at the age of 16 and played for the Second XI in the Minor Counties Championship from 1955. He moved up to the first team in the 1960 season, making his debut against Worcestershire. He hit one of his two half-century innings in 1960 against Essex. Millner played regularly in the 1961 season making his top score of 80 against Kent. He spent 1962 out of first-class cricket, though he spent a small period of time covering in the Second XI. In the 1963 season, he played for the first team for some of the games and also took part in the Gillette Cup. He appeared in the Gillette Cup again in the 1964 season but was otherwise in the second XI.

Millner was a right-handed batsman and played 56 innings in 31 first-class matches with an average of 12.74 and a top score of 80. He played two innings in two one day matches in which he made a total of 29. He was a right-arm off-break bowler and bowled six overs in first-class cricket without taking a wicket.
