= Roger de Ville =

English cricketer

Personal information
- Full name: Roger Thomas de Ville
- Born: 21 January 1935; Uttoxeter, Staffordshire, England
- Died: 8 October 2021 (aged 86); Denstone, East Staffordshire, England
- Batting: Right-handed
- Bowling: Leg-break

Domestic team information
- Years: Team
- 1963–1964: Derbyshire
- 1971–1973: Staffordshire
- FC debut: 5 June 1963 Derbyshire v Northamptonshire
- Last FC: 17 June 1964 Derbyshire v Oxford University
- LA debut: 15 May 1971 Staffordshire v Glamorgan
- Last LA: 30 June 1973 Staffordshire v Dorset

Career statistics
| Competition | First-class | List A |
|---|---|---|
| Matches | 3 | 2 |
| Runs scored | 26 | 2 |
| Batting average | 8.66 | 1.00 |
| 100s/50s | 0/0 | 0/0 |
| Top score | 17 | 1 |
| Balls bowled | 192 | 42 |
| Wickets | 2 | 1 |
| Bowling average | 73.00 | 42.00 |
| 5 wickets in innings | 0 | 0 |
| 10 wickets in match | 0 | 0 |
| Best bowling | 2/47 | 1/18 |
| Catches/stumpings | 0/– | 0/– |
- Source: CricketArchive, November 2011

Roger Thomas de Ville (21 January 1935 – 8 October 2021) was an English cricketer who played first-class cricket for Derbyshire in 1963 and 1964. He was later an antiques dealer.

== Life and career ==
De Ville was born at Uttoxeter, Staffordshire. He began playing for Derbyshire in 1955, when he turned out for the Second XI in the Minor Counties Championship. In the 1963 season he was brought into the first team as a lower-order batsman. He played two games in the season. In the 1964 season he played one more game for the Derbyshire against Oxford University.

De Ville was a right-handed batsman who played five innings in three first-class matches with an average of 8.66 and a top score of 17. He was a leg-break bowler, but his lack of consistency saw him dropped in favour of quicker bowlers such as Brian Jackson. He took two wickets at an average of 73.00 and a best performance of 2 for 47.

De Ville moved to Staffordshire, where he played in the Minor Counties Championship until 1973. He played two ListA matches for Staffordshire. Later in his career, he played for Marylebone Cricket Club, until 1977.

After his cricket career de Ville became an antiques dealer, specialising in 18th and 19th century British pottery. He died at home in Denstone in October 2021, aged 86.
