= William Richardson (Derbyshire cricketer) =

English cricketer (born 1938)

Personal information
- Full name: George William Richardson
- Born: 26 April 1938 (age 88); Marylebone, London, England
- Batting: Right-handed
- Bowling: Left-arm medium-fast
- Relatives: Arthur Walker Richardson (father); Alastair Richardson (son)

Domestic team information
- Years: Team
- 1959–1965: Derbyshire
- FC debut: 23 May 1959 Derbyshire v Worcestershire
- Last FC: 31 July 1965 Derbyshire v Worcestershire
- LA debut: 22 May 1963 Derbyshire v Hampshire
- Last LA: 22 May 1965 Derbyshire v Middlesex

Career statistics
Competition	First-class	LA
Matches	69	3
Runs scored	1,460	44
Batting average	15.86	14.66
100s/50s	0/6	0/0
Top score	91	39
Balls bowled	8,170	229
Wickets	147	8
Bowling average	27.70	19.12
5 wickets in innings	5	0
10 wickets in match	2	0
Best bowling	8/54	4/49
Catches/stumpings	12/–	0/–
- Source: Cricinfo, 21 April 2011

George William Richardson (born 26 April 1938) is a former English cricketer who played first-class cricket for Derbyshire between 1959 and 1965.

== Cricket career ==
Richardson was born at Marylebone, London, the son of Arthur Richardson, who played for Derbyshire between 1928 and 1936 and was club captain for five of those years, leading the team to the County Championship in 1936.

A left-arm medium-fast bowler and right-handed lower-order batsman, Richardson was educated at Winchester College. He started his career as an amateur at Derbyshire in the 1959 season, taking three wickets in his debut match against Worcestershire, and making his top score of 91 in his next match against Glamorgan. Against Kent, in one match he achieved his best bowling performance of 8 for 54 and in the other almost matched it with 7 for 31. In the 1960 season in a single match against Warwickshire he took 6 for 46 and 5 for 35 and scored 51 in an innings victory. From 1961 he played intermittently. He played seven games in the 1961 season, but fifteen in the 1962 season. He played for the Gentlemen in the last-ever Gentlemen v Players match in 1962.

After amateur status was abolished in cricket, Richardson played three first-class matches in the 1963 season and one in the 1964 season, as well as the Gillette Cup in both years. In the 1965 season he played one Gillette Cup match and six first-class matches in the course of which he took 5 for 57 against Kent.

Richardson scored 1,460 runs in 69 first-class matches with an average of 15.86 and a top score of 91. He played three innings in three one-day matches and made 39 runs. He took 147 first-class wickets with an average of 27.70 and a best performance of 8 for 54. He took 8 wickets in the one-day game.

Richardson was the second of three generations of Richardson family members to play first-class cricket for Derbyshire. His son Alastair Richardson played in 1992 and 1993.
