= Alastair Richardson =

English cricketer

Alastair William Richardson
Personal information
- Born: 23 October 1972 (age 54); Derby, England
- Batting: Right-handed
- Bowling: Right-arm medium-fast
- Role: Batsman
- Relatives: William Richardson (father); Arthur Richardson (grandfather)

Domestic team information
- Years: Team
- 1992–1993: Derbyshire
- FC debut: 12 September 1992 Derbyshire v Glamorgan
- Last FC: 12 August 1993 Derbyshire v Somerset

Career statistics
Competition	First-class
Matches	2
Runs scored	14
Batting average	4.66
100s/50s	0/0
Top score	9
Balls bowled	210
Wickets	2
Bowling average	56.00
5 wickets in innings	0
10 wickets in match	0
Best bowling	2/38
Catches/stumpings	0/–
- Source: ESPNcricinfo, 23 April 2025

Alastair William Richardson (born 23 October 1972) is an English former cricketer. He was a right-handed batsman and a right-arm medium-fast bowler who played for Derbyshire between 1992 and 1993.

Born at Derby and the son of William Richardson and grandson of former Derbyshire captain Arthur Walker Richardson, he had a short-lived first-class career, despite taking two wickets on his debut against Glamorgan in the final match of the 1992 season, including that of Matthew Maynard. He played only once more for the 1st Xl, against Somerset the following summer. Although a "regular wicket taker" in the 2nd XI, Derbyshire did not offer him terms in 1995.

Richardson studied at Durham University (1992–1996), where he played for the university team.
