= David Short (cricketer) =

English cricketer

Personal information
- Full name: John David Short
- Born: 13 June 1934 (age 92); Chesterfield, Derbyshire, England
- Batting: Right-handed
- Bowling: Right-arm off-break
- Relatives: Bob Short (brother)

Domestic team information
- Years: Team
- 1957–1960: Derbyshire
- FC debut: 17 August 1957 Derbyshire v Somerset
- Last FC: 30 July 1960 Derbyshire v Northamptonshire

Career statistics
| Competition | First-class |
|---|---|
| Matches | 11 |
| Runs scored | 271 |
| Batting average | 14.26 |
| 100s/50s | 0/1 |
| Top score | 86 |
| Balls bowled | 18 |
| Wickets | 0 |
| Bowling average | – |
| 5 wickets in innings | – |
| 10 wickets in match | – |
| Best bowling | – |
| Catches/stumpings | 6/– |
- Source: CricketArchive, January 2012

John David Short (born 13 June 1934) is a former English cricketer who played first-class cricket for Derbyshire in 1957 and 1960.

Short was born at Chesterfield, Derbyshire. He was educated at Denstone College, where he played in the first XI from 1950 to 1952. He then joined Derbyshire and played in the club and ground and second XI teams. From 1955 to 1956 he played for the RAF. His debut in first-class cricket came for Derbyshire in the 1957 season when he played in July against Somerset. He also continued playing second XI games. In the 1960 season he returned to the first team in time for the start of 1960, and hit his only half-century against Warwickshire. He then stopped playing for Derbyshire.

Short was a right-handed batsman and played 19 innings in eleven first-class matches with an average of 14.26 and a top score of 86. He was a right-arm offbreak bowler but only bowled three overs in the first-class game and took no wickets.

Short's brother, Bob played cricket for the Derbyshire Second XI from 1967 to 1968 and for Cambridge University from 1969 to 1970.
