= Ian Gibson (cricketer) =

English cricketer and doctor

Personal information
- Born: 15 August 1936; Glossop, Derbyshire, England
- Died: 3 May 1963 (aged 26); Bowden, Lancashire, England
- Batting: Right-handed
- Bowling: Leg break, googly

Domestic team information
- Years: Team
- 1956–1958: Oxford University
- 1957–1961: Derbyshire
- 1961: MCC
- FC debut: 30 April 1955 Oxford Univ. v Gloucestershire
- Last FC: 30 August 1961 Derbyshire v Hampshire

Career statistics
Competition	First-class
Matches	51
Runs scored	1,697
Batting average	19.96
100s/50s	1/10
Top score	100*
Balls bowled	3,299
Wickets	51
Bowling average	38.41
5 wickets in innings	2
10 wickets in match	0
Best bowling	5/29
Catches/stumpings	29/–
- Source: CricketArchive, December 2011

Ian Gibson (15 August 1936 – 3 May 1963) was an English doctor and cricketer who played first-class cricket for Oxford University between 1955 and 1958, for Derbyshire between 1957 and 1961 and for Marylebone Cricket Club (MCC) in 1961.

== Biography ==
Gibson was born in Glossop and was educated at Manchester Grammar School, where he was in the first XI from 1951 to 1954 and was captain in the last two years. In 1953 he played for the Public Schools XI and at the age of 17 began playing for the Lancashire Second XI in the Minor Counties Championship. He went to Brasenose College, Oxford, and in 1955 began his first-class cricketing career with Oxford University. He made his first-class debut against Gloucestershire, and played fifteen first-class games for the university and followed up his series of university matches playing for Lancashire 2nd XI. Gibson played as a lower-order batsman for Oxford, and took just four wickets with the ball during his first season. He continued to play for both teams in 1956, with similar batting statistics, scoring three further first-class half-centuries.

In 1957, Gibson achieved his career-best innings of 100 not out in a draw for Oxford University against Gloucestershire. He joined Derbyshire in the 1957 season and spent his university holidays in both the first and second teams. He made his County Championship debut for Derbyshire against Nottinghamshire, in which he scored a half-century in his first innings. He played six further first-class matches for the Derbyshire in the latter stages of the season, when Derbyshire finished the season in fourth place in the County Championship.

Gibson played for Oxford University in 1958, keeping his position in the upper order. After Oxford, he continued his medical training at Guy's Hospital, playing cricket for the hospital and also for the Free Foresters. By 1961 season, he was turning out again for the Derbyshire Second XI and played one first-class game. He also played two matches for Marylebone Cricket Club.

Gibson was described as excellent batsman especially strong in strokes off the back foot, a fine fieldsman and a useful leg-break bowler. He was a right-handed batsman and played 92 innings in 51 first-class matches with an average of 19.96 and a top score of 100 not out. He was a leg-break and googly bowler and took 51 first-class wickets with an average of 38.41 and a best performance of 5 for 29.

His mental health deteriorated at the start of the 1960s, with Gibson suffering a nervous breakdown just before Christmas in 1962. Weighed down by high parental expectations and his workload as a doctor, Gibson committed suicide by gassing himself in Bowdon at the age of 26.
