= Bob Short (cricketer) =

English cricketer

Personal information
- Full name: Robert Leslie Short
- Born: 12 September 1948 (age 78); Chesterfield, Derbyshire, England
- Batting: Right-handed
- Relatives: David Short (brother)

Domestic team information
- Years: Team
- 1969–1970: Cambridge University

Career statistics
Competition	First-class
Matches	11
Runs scored	355
Batting average	18.68
100s/50s	–/1
Top score	58
Catches/stumpings	4/–
- Source: Cricinfo, 10 January 2022

Robert 'Bob' Leslie Short (born 12 September 1948) is an English former first-class cricketer.

Short was born at Chesterfield in September 1948. He was educated at Denstone College, before going up to Emmanuel College, Cambridge. While studying at Cambridge, he played first-class cricket for Cambridge University Cricket Club in 1969 and 1970, making eleven appearances against. Playing as a batsman in the Cambridge side, Short scored 355 runs at an average of 18.68; he recorded one half century, a score of 58, which was his only score above fifty. His brother, David, played first-class cricket at county level.
