= William Oates (cricketer, born 1929) =

English cricketer (1929–2001)

Personal information
- Full name: William Farrand Oates
- Born: 11 June 1929; Sheffield, England
- Died: 15 May 2001 (aged 71); Canada
- Batting: Right-handed
- Bowling: Right-arm off-break; Right-arm medium

Domestic team information
- Years: Team
- 1956: Yorkshire
- 1959–1965: Derbyshire
- FC debut: 27 June 1956 Yorkshire v Australians
- Last FC: 1 September 1965 Derbyshire v Yorkshire
- LA debut: 22 May 1963 Derbyshire v Hampshire
- Last LA: 22 May 1965 Derbyshire v Middlesex

Career statistics
Competition	First-class	List A
Matches	124	5
Runs scored	4,588	50
Batting average	22.94	10.00
100s/50s	2/28	0/0
Top score	148*	14
Balls bowled	1,090	–
Wickets	13	–
Bowling average	44.38	–
5 wickets in innings	1	–
10 wickets in match	0	–
Best bowling	6/47	–
Catches/stumpings	54/–	0/–
- Source: CricketArchive, May 2011

William Farrand Oates (11 June 1929 – 15 May 2001) was an English first-class cricketer, who played for Yorkshire in 1956, and for Derbyshire from 1959 to 1965.

== Life ==
Oates was born in Aston, Sheffield, Yorkshire, England. He played his early cricket with the local Aston Hall club, where his father was president as well being President of the Sheffield League. Oates also played with Sheffield United and headed the Yorkshire 2nd XI averages in 1956.

Oates played three matches for Yorkshire in 1956, including one against the touring Australians, but failed to cement a first team place.

Oates moved to Derbyshire in the 1959 season where he played five matches in the season. In the 1960 season he played seven matches with no significant performances. In the 1961 season he scored over 1200 runs and made his best score of 148 not out against Sussex. In the 1962 season he made 1100 runs and scored 101 against Somerset. He scored well in the 1963 and in the 1964 season achieved his best bowling performance of 6 for 47 against Oxford University. In 1965 he was much less successful, and he left Derbyshire at the end of the season.

Oates was a right-handed batsman, and played 214 innings in 124 first-class matches in the middle-order, scoring 4,588 runs at an average of 22.94 and making two centuries. He was an off-break bowler and took 13 first-class wickets at an average of 44.38, and a best performance of six for 47 with a mixture of right-arm medium pace and offbreaks, In all matches, he took 54 catches. Oates also played in 5 one-day matches, scoring 50 runs at 10.00.

In 1965, and after leaving Derbyshire, Oates became a professional at Golcar C.C. and from 1966 to 1968 with Paddock C.C. when they twice won the Sykes Cup. He assisted Elland C.C. in 1969 and 1970, also leading the Huddersfield League representative side. He returned to play for Aston Hall C.C. in the 1970s.

Oates emigrated to Canada after his retirement from the game, dying there at the age of 71.

Every year the Yorkshire Cricket Southern Premier League holds the Billy Oates Memorial Cup in his honour.
