= Eric Hollies =

English cricketer

Personal information
- Full name: William Eric Hollies
- Born: 5 June 1912; Old Hill, Staffordshire, England
- Died: 16 April 1981 (aged 68); Chinley, Derbyshire, England
- Batting: Right-handed
- Bowling: Right arm leg spin

International information
- National side: England
- Test debut (cap 277): 8 January 1935 v West Indies
- Last Test: 25 July 1950 v West Indies

Domestic team information
- Years: Team
- 1932–1957: Warwickshire

Career statistics
Competition	Test	First-class
Matches	13	515
Runs scored	37	1,673
Batting average	5.28	5.00
100s/50s	0/0	0/0
Top score	18*	47
Balls bowled	3,554	130,625
Wickets	44	2,323
Bowling average	30.27	20.94
5 wickets in innings	5	182
10 wickets in match	0	40
Best bowling	7/50	10/49
Catches/stumpings	2/–	179/–
- Source: Cricinfo, 6 June 2009

William Eric Hollies (5 June 1912 – 16 April 1981) was an English cricketer, who is mainly remembered for dismissing Donald Bradman for a duck in Bradman's final Test match innings, in which he needed only four runs for a Test average of 100. Hollies played all his first-class cricket career for Warwickshire, taking 2,323 wickets at less than 21 apiece.

Cricket writer Colin Bateman noted "Hollies was one of cricket's most extraordinary characters, whose meagre thirteen Tests in no way reflected his contribution to the game. He was a fastish leg-break bowler who rarely had much use for the googly." Bateman added "loquacious, with a rich seam of Black Country humour, he was an immensely respected and hard-working cricketer".

== Life and career ==
Hollies was born in Old Hill, Staffordshire. A leg spin bowler, Hollies made his English county debut for Warwickshire in 1932 and debuted for England in 1935, after showing his skill on the generally easy Edgbaston wickets. Hollies did not spin the ball as much as most leg-spinners but he gained in accuracy as a result, and he frequently bowled amazingly long spells for his county, most notably 73 overs in one innings against Worcestershire in 1949. He varied his stock leg-break with a top-spinner and a googly that was well concealed and gained him many wickets, most famously the one of Bradman in 1948.

He took over 100 wickets for Warwickshire every year between 1935 and 1957, with the exceptions of 1936 (dreadful weather that reduced his normally prodigious output of overs), 1953 (injury) and 1956 (poor form, probably due to him captaining the side). During the war, when three-day cricket was impossible due to the labour demands of war production and military service, Hollies bowled for West Bromwich Dartmouth in the Birmingham and District League and his skill was such as to make them invincible. With Hollies taking a total of 499 wickets as their professional, West Bromwich Dartmouth won the league every year from 1941 to 1945 and lost only seven matches during the war period.

At his peak, he was one of the best bowlers in England, and it is believed that the Marylebone Cricket Club (MCC) erred in not taking him to Australia, after he was the leading wicket-taker in the country for a struggling Warwickshire side in 1946. That year, on one of the relatively few hard pitches, he took, without the direct assistance of a fielder, all ten wickets (seven bowled, three LBW) in an innings against Nottinghamshire.

After a poor season in 1947, Hollies returned to form in 1948, and was the one bowler who looked threatening against the Australian batsmen. He famously bowled out Bradman second ball for a duck, when the latter needed just four runs to ensure a Test match average of at least 100. In addition to his performance in the Oval Test, he took eight for 107 against a strong batting side for his county. In 1949, he played in all four Tests against New Zealand but the pitches blunted his effectiveness (though he was always steady), and from 1951, when English bowling recovered some of its pre-Second World War strength, he was never in the running for Test honours, despite playing a major role in Warwickshire's County Championship success in 1951.

He continued to bowl well right up to his last match, and was finally named as one of the Wisden Cricketers of the Year in 1955, after taking 100 wickets for the tenth time. By the time of his retirement from first-class cricket in 1957, he had taken more wickets for Warwickshire than any other player.

After Hollies retired from county cricket, he played for Staffordshire a few times in 1958, and continued to bowl in league cricket until the 1970s.

Hollies was, however, remarkable for his incompetence as a batsman. His total of 1,673 runs was 650 fewer than his haul of wickets, and only once (in 1954) did he reach 30 in an innings. In fact, he did not reach 20 in any innings between 1946 and 1953, and equalled an all-time first-class record,^{[a]} between July 1948 and August 1950, of seventy-one consecutive innings without reaching double figures. The nearest approach was by Nobby Clark of Northamptonshire with sixty-five innings without reaching double figures between 1925 and 1927.

"The last time I saw Eric Hollies bat at Birmingham,” recalled Jack Fingleton in 1958, "he was clapped and cheered all the way to the middle at No. 11. Everybody knew there would be no pretty passes at the ball and deft deflections from Eric. They knew that if he could only survive two balls they would see something in batting unknown to any textbook". Bateman added: "when it was time to get his pads on, Eric would prop his bat up in the Edgbaston dressing room window and say to it: 'Now while I’m getting ready, you find out what the ball’s doing'”.

Warwickshire CCC named one of the stands at Edgbaston Cricket Ground, the 'Eric Hollies Stand.

Hollies died in Chinley, Derbyshire in April 1981, at the age of 68.

== Bibliography ==
- Fingleton, Jack: Masters of Cricket: From Trumper to May (Heinemann, 1958).

== Notes ==
^{a} Jem Shaw between 1865 and 1870 played his first seventy-one first-class innings before reaching double figures.
