= Bob Berry (cricketer) =

English cricketer

Personal information
- Full name: Robert Berry
- Born: 29 January 1926; Gorton, Manchester, Lancashire, England
- Died: 2 December 2006 (aged 80); Manchester, England
- Batting: Left-handed
- Bowling: Slow left-arm orthodox

International information
- National side: England
- Test debut: 8 June 1950 v West Indies
- Last Test: 24 June 1950 v West Indies

Domestic team information
- Years: Team
- 1948–1964: Lancashire
- 1955–1958: Worcestershire
- 1959–1962: Derbyshire

Career statistics
Competition	Test	First-class
Matches	2	273
Runs scored	6	1,463
Batting average	3.00	7.58
100s/50s	0/0	0/0
Top score	4*	40
Balls bowled	653	50,680
Wickets	9	703
Bowling average	25.33	24.73
5 wickets in innings	1	34
10 wickets in match	0	5
Best bowling	5/63	10/102
Catches/stumpings	2/–	138/–
- Source: CricketArchive, 24 May 2011

Robert Berry (29 January 1926 – 2 December 2006) was an English cricketer. He played in two Test matches in 1950. He played county cricket for Lancashire from 1948 to 1954, for Worcestershire from 1955 to 1958, and for Derbyshire from 1959 to 1962. He was the first cricketer to be capped by three different counties.

== Life and career ==
Berry was born in Gorton, Manchester, Lancashire, the youngest of 10 children. He played League cricket in both Lancashire and Cheshire before making his debut for Lancashire in 1948. Within two years and having taken barely more than 50 first-class wickets, he was in the England Test side, having taken 5 wickets in a Test trial. He was picked for the 1st Test against the West Indies at his home ground of Old Trafford in 1950, on a pitch made for spinners – each side played three. Berry took 5–63 in the first innings and 4–53 in the second, to finish with match figures of 9–116. Eric Hollies took another 8 wickets for England (3–70 and 5–63), and West Indian debutant Alf Valentine took 11–204 (for West Indies 8–104 and 3–100). England won by 202 runs.

Berry retained his place for the 2nd Test at Lord's. On a much less helpful pitch to spinners, he was unable to match his Old Trafford success. He bowled economically, but took no wickets (0–45 in 19 overs, and 0–67 in 32 overs). By contrast, the West Indian spinners Sonny Ramadhin and Alf Valentine continued their success from Manchester, taking 18 wickets between them, and the West Indies won the match, their first Test victory in England. Berry was dropped after this match.

By the end of the 1950 season, Berry was not even first-choice left-arm spinner for Lancashire, his long-time friend Malcolm Hilton being often preferred as the spin alternative to the off-spin of Roy Tattersall. Hilton was reckoned as the more devastating bowler on a turning wicket, and could also bowl flatter and faster than Berry, which meant that he was at times used to open the bowling. Berry was known for flight and spin, but was also inclined to be more expensive than Hilton. Nonetheless, it was Berry who was picked for the 1950–51 Marylebone Cricket Club (MCC) tour to Australia and New Zealand under Freddie Brown. He had a poor tour on pitches not designed for spin and was not chosen for any of the Test matches, with Doug Wright being preferred. Hilton was picked for the 1951–52 tour to India, and Berry did not play Test cricket again.

Berry stayed with Lancashire for four more seasons, but was usually considered as second choice to Hilton, except in 1953, when Hilton had the first experience of the loss of control that was eventually to end his career. In that season, Berry took 98 wickets at an average of 18.97, including all 10 in an innings for Lancashire against Worcestershire at Blackpool. He toured India successfully in the winter of 1953–54 with a Commonwealth XI, but with the return of Hilton, Lancashire picked him for only six County Championship matches in 1954, and he left at the end of the season to join Worcestershire.

Berry enjoyed considerable success in his four seasons with Worcestershire, before leaving to join Derbyshire in the 1959 season He played four further seasons until the 1962 season. He was the first cricketer to receive a county cap from three different first-class counties.

Berry was an orthodox slow left-arm spin bowler and took 703 first-class wickets. He was an excellent outfielder, but a tail-end left-handed batsman. In all first-class cricket, his highest first-class score was 40.

Berry became a publican after he retired from professional cricket, running pubs in Burton, Derby, Mansfield and Farnsfield. He was president of Farnsfield Cricket Club and of the Lancashire Players' Association. It is often claimed that he bred pigeons, but that misapprehension originates from an incident at a match against Derbyshire at Queen's Park, Chesterfield, when Berry rescued a pigeon from the pitch.

He married twice. After his first wife, Eileen, died in 1992, Berry married Vera Hilton, the widow of his long-time friend and rival Malcolm Hilton, who had died in 1990. He finally retired to Greenfield near Oldham in 2004, and died in Manchester. He was survived by his second wife.
