= 1995 English cricket season =

The 1995 English cricket season was the 96th in which the County Championship had been an official competition. There was a continued dominance of the domestic scene by Warwickshire after they won the Britannic Assurance County Championship and the NatWest Trophy. The West Indies toured England to compete in a test series which was drawn 2-2.

== Honours ==
- County Championship - Warwickshire CCC
- NatWest Trophy - Warwickshire CCC
- Sunday League - Kent CCC
- Benson & Hedges Cup - Lancashire CCC
- Minor Counties Championship - Devon
- MCCA Knockout Trophy - Cambridgeshire
- Second XI Championship - Hampshire II
- Wisden - Dominic Cork, Aravinda de Silva, Angus Fraser, Anil Kumble, Dermot Reeve

== Test series ==
=== West Indies tour ===
England played against West Indies and drew 2–2.

== Annual reviews ==
- Playfair Cricket Annual 1996
- Wisden Cricketers' Almanack 1996
