= Ray Swallow =

English cricketer and footballer

Personal information
- Full name: Raymond Swallow
- Born: 15 June 1935 (age 91); Southwark, London
- Batting: Right-handed

Domestic team information
- Years: Team
- 1959–1963: Derbyshire
- FC debut: 3 July 1957 MCC v Scotland
- Last FC: 8 June 1963 Derbyshire v Yorkshire

Career statistics
Competition	First-class
Matches	38
Runs scored	1,323
Batting average	20.04
100s/50s	1/6
Top score	115
Balls bowled	24
Wickets	0
Bowling average	–
5 wickets in innings	–
10 wickets in match	–
Best bowling	–
Catches/stumpings	13/–
- Source: CricketArchive, May 2011

Raymond Swallow (born 15 June 1935) is an English former cricketer and footballer. He played football for Arsenal between 1955 and 1957 and cricket for Marylebone Cricket Club (MCC) in 1957. He then played football for Derby County between 1958 and 1963 and cricket for Derbyshire between 1959 and 1963.

== Football career ==
Swallow was born in Southwark, and started his footballing career at Tooting & Mitcham United where he was part of the Athenian League Reserve Section Cup winning side of 1950–51. He then joined Arsenal as a trainee in 1952. After three years in Arsenal's youth and reserve sides (interrupted by a bout of National Service) he made his Arsenal first-team debut on 8 April 1955 against Cardiff City. He was only a bit-part player at Arsenal and made a total of 13 appearances at wing half or inside forward, scoring four goals, over the course of four seasons.

In September 1958 he moved to Derby County; over the course of five years he played 118 times and scored 21 goals in the league, before leaving the game in 1963.

== Cricket career ==
Swallow played a one-off game for MCC against Scotland in 1957. He made his debut for Derbyshire in the 1959 season in a single game against the touring Indians, playing otherwise in the second XI. His first County Championship appearance came in the 1960 season. During this first season he scored heavily, making two half-centuries, the first on his debut performance. In the 1962 season he made his top score of 115 against Oxford University.

Throughout his career, Swallow played mainly as an opening batsman, though in his last season he moved to the middle-order.

Swallow was a right-handed batsman and played 68 innings in 38 first-class games with an average of 20.04 and a top score of 115. He bowled four overs without taking a wicket.

== See also ==
- List of English cricket and football players
