= Nobby Clark (cricketer) =

English cricketer

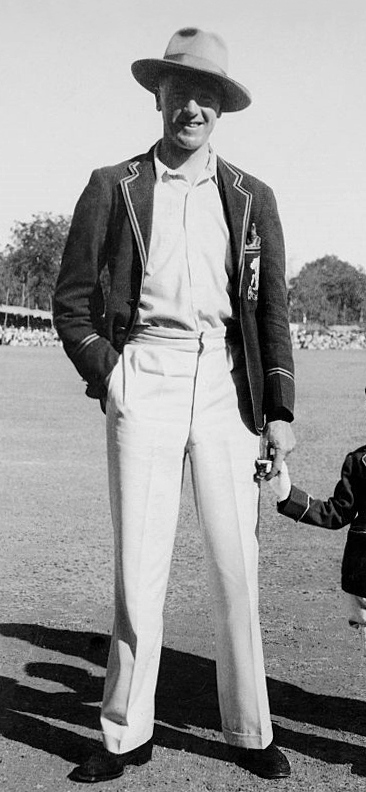
- Clark in India in 1934

Personal information
- Full name: Edward Winchester Clark
- Born: 9 August 1902; Elton, Huntingdonshire, England
- Died: 28 April 1982 (aged 79); King's Lynn, Norfolk, England
- Batting: Left-handed
- Bowling: Left-arm fast

International information
- National side: England (1929-1934)
- Test debut: 17 August 1929 v South Africa
- Last Test: 18 August 1934 v Australia

Career statistics
Competition	Tests	First-class
Matches	8	338
Runs scored	36	1,971
Batting average	9.00	6.25
100s/50s	0/0	0/0
Top score	10	30
Balls bowled	1,931	60,997
Wickets	32	1,208
Bowling average	28.09	21.49
5 wickets in innings	1	63
10 wickets in match	0	15
Best bowling	5/98	8/59
Catches/stumpings	0/–	102/–
- Source: CricInfo, 17 March 2019

Edward Winchester "Nobby" Clark (9 August 1902 – 28 April 1982) was a Northamptonshire and England cricketer of the inter-war period. He was regarded at the time as one of the best fast bowlers in England.

== Talents and limitations ==
While Clark was playing for them, Northamptonshire was considered one of the weakest counties ever to play in the County Championship. Nonetheless, Clark was a bowler of fast pace who could swing the ball in and make it break away to produce catches in the slips. He could also bowl, as Bill Voce did under Jardine, to a leg-side field, but was never as effective doing so. Like Voce, Clark often bowled round the wicket. At his best, "Nobby" Clark was the fastest professional bowler apart from Harold Larwood and his action enabled him to stand up to the considerable spells of work required of him given that Northamptonshire had little support in the field apart from Fred Bakewell at short leg.

However, his fiery temperament – he would get angry over even slight problems like broken footholds or missed chances – greatly reduced Clark's appeal to selectors for Test and other representative matches. "Nobby"'s extreme weakness as a batsman further reduced his chances of competing with players who were much better bats and could bowl almost as well. Between July 1925 and June 1927 Clark played sixty-five innings without reaching double figures and he never made more than 30 in a first-class innings.

== Career ==
Clark was born near Peterborough and first played for Northamptonshire as a teenager in 1922 after success in Yorkshire League cricket. He came to prominence in 1925, when he took eleven wickets in a surprise win over Kent and was in the top twenty of the national averages. Despite playing in the 1928 Test Trial, injury meant he was not seriously in contention for a place on the Ashes tour.

In 1929, however, Clark recovered his form to miss 150 wickets by only one and play his first Test at Kennington Oval, where he was criticised for overdoing leg theory. The extreme financial difficulties faced by Northamptonshire – at one point the club was poised to exit the first-class arena – caused "Nobby" Clark to leave in July 1930 for league cricket. He returned to the county in 1932.

Clark, in early 1933, bowled as fast and as well as he ever had done. In the first match against the touring West Indians he took ten for 61 and in his first six matches 52 wickets for 574 runs. However, after that he was affected by injury but he still took eleven wickets in his two Tests and was chosen for the first Test-playing tour of India that winter.

Clark's 1934 season was again plagued by injury, but he was still regarded so highly that he played in two Tests against Australia. At Old Trafford he bowled well on one of the most docile of pitches but had no luck, but in the last Test at the Oval he took five for 98 including the valuable scalps of Brown, Ponsford, McCabe and Kippax. He also failed twice by the narrowest of margins to bowl Don Bradman.

In 1935 Clark was bowling for a Northamptonshire side growing weaker and weaker by the year: they lost thirteen consecutive matches in the second half of the season, in several of which "Nobby"'s bowling gave them the upper hand only for feeble batting to ruin their advantage. He would have played in the Old Trafford Test against the South Africans but for yet another injury, but, though he bowled well in an unfavourably wet summer in 1936, his age was already making it hard to maintain speed beyond a few overs and he was never considered for a Test place.

It was still a surprise, though, when Clark in 1937 declined so much apart from one haul of six for 29 against Essex that Northamptonshire, already so weak that they had not won any of their last 71 county matches, decided not to re-engage him. After the war in 1946, although he was forty-three, Northamptonshire surprisingly re-engaged "Nobby" and he showed himself still the fastest bowler for four or five overs in England. He was, however, quite naturally unable to bowl any long spell and consequently he did nothing exceptional. 1947 saw him play about half the matches before he retired for good as Northamptonshire's greatest-ever wicket-taker.
