= Jem Shaw =

English cricketer

James Shaw
Personal information
- Full name: James Coupe Shaw
- Born: 11 April 1836; Sutton-in-Ashfield, Nottinghamshire, England
- Died: 7 March 1888 (aged 51); Sutton-in-Ashfield, England
- Nickname: Jem
- Height: 5 ft 9 in (175 cm)
- Batting: Right-handed
- Bowling: Left-arm fast

Domestic team information
- Years: Team
- 186–1875: Nottinghamshire
- FC debut: 26 June 1865 Notts v Surrey
- Last FC: 14 June 1875 Notts v MCC

Career statistics
Competition	First-class
Matches	115
Runs scored	467
Batting average	4.24
100s/50s	0/0
Top score	18*
Balls bowled	27,321
Wickets	642
Bowling average	14.41
5 wickets in innings	59
10 wickets in match	18
Best bowling	9/86
Catches/stumpings	62/–
- Source: CricketArchive, 22 February 2011

James Coupe "Jem" Shaw (11 April 1836 – 7 March 1888) was an English professional cricketer who played for Nottinghamshire from 1865 to 1875 making 115 appearances. According to WG Grace, few bowlers had a better record.

Shaw was born at Sutton-in-Ashfield, Nottinghamshire. He joined Nottinghamshire in 1865 and played every consecutive Notts game over a ten-year period. He also made numerous appearances in representative teams such as the Players in the Gentlemen v Players series, the North of England cricket team and the All England Eleven. He played against W G Grace many times and had some successes, including twice dismissing him for nought in 1871. Grace said after the second of these that he "would pay particular attention to J C Shaw". In the next innings, Grace scored a double-century. Shaw's comment afterwards was famous for its ruefulness and it has often been quoted: "I puts the ball where I likes and he puts it where he likes".

Shaw was a left-arm round arm fast bowler and took 642 first-class wickets at an average of 14.41 and a best performance of 9 for 86. WG Grace noted that he had a high-delivery that was sometimes difficult to play, and brought his arm from behind with a very quick action making it difficult to see. Shaw still has the best ever bowling figures for Nottinghamshire, taking 10 wickets for 20 runs in a match against an England XI in 1870 He was a right-hand batsman and played 176 innings in 115 matches with an average of 4.24 and a top score of 18 not out. Grace described him as a very poor bat – in fact Shaw did not reach double figures until his seventy-second first-class innings, setting a record since equalled only by Eric Hollies for consecutive single-figure innings. Indeed, for Nottinghamshire Shaw reached double figures only once in 109 visits to the crease.

Shaw died at Sutton-in-Ashfield, Nottinghamshire, at the age of 51.

== Bibliography ==
- Simon Rae, W G Grace: A Life, Faber & Faber, 1998
