= Laurie Johnson (cricketer) =

West Indian cricketer (1927–2020)

Personal information
- Full name: Hubert Laurence Johnson
- Born: 8 November 1927; St Michael, Barbados
- Died: 4 February 2020 (aged 92); Sutton Coldfield, West Midlands, England
- Batting: Right-handed
- Bowling: Right-arm off-spin
- Role: Batsman

Domestic team information
- Years: Team
- 1948–1966: Derbyshire
- First-class debut: 18 June 1949 Derbyshire v Gloucestershire
- Last First-class: 20 August 1966 Derbyshire v Glamorgan
- List A debut: 22 May 1963 Derbyshire v Hampshire
- Last List A: 21 May 1966 Derbyshire v Essex

Career statistics
Competition	First-class	List A
Matches	361	5
Runs scored	14,286	69
Batting average	26.40	13.80
100s/50s	16/57	0/0
Top score	154	32
Balls bowled	1,178	0
Wickets	21	–
Bowling average	39.14	–
5 wickets in innings	0	–
10 wickets in match	0	–
Best bowling	3/12	–
Catches/stumpings	217/2	2/–
- Source: Cricinfo, 16 April 2011

Hubert Laurence Johnson (8 November 1927 – 4 February 2020) was a Barbados-born cricketer who played first-class cricket for Derbyshire between 1949 and 1966, scoring more than 14,000 runs.

== Life and career ==
Johnson was born at Pine Hill, St Michael, Barbados. He was educated at The Lodge School, well known as the cradle of cricket in Barbados, where he benefited from the coaching of Leslie Arthur "Bessie" Walcott. Johnson was invited to the BCA trials in 1945 and in 1946 he was part of the Barbados team to Trinidad, but did not play. However, he scored centuries against Combermere, Spartan and Wanderers, and then migrated to England to train as a sugar industry engineer.

Johnson played for the Swarkestone Cricket Club, and appeared for Derbyshire in 2nd XI matches in 1947 and 1948. He made his first-class debut against Gloucestershire in June 1949 and made 23 and 6 in the match. He played regularly in the first and second Derbyshire teams in 1949 and 1950, but then returned to British Guiana. He reappeared for Derbyshire in 1955 and was a first team regular for the next ten years. He built up his scoring rate to reach over 1400 runs in 1959 and then became a top scorer. In 1960 he hit his first centuries with 140 against Glamorgan, 130 against Essex, 113 against Lancashire and 109 against Leicestershire. In 1961 he scored 122 against Gloucestershire, 119 against Essex, 116 against Leicestershire and 112 against Hampshire. In 1962 he made his top score of 154 against Leicestershire, and scored 108 against Somerset and 114 against Sussex. He scored five centuries in 1964 with 137 against Nottinghamshire, 132 against Somerset, 101 against Warwickshire, 101 not out against the Australians and 100 against Middlesex. The run scoring fell back in 1965 and 1966, and he ended his career at the end of the 1966 season. For the last four years he played in the List A Gillette Cup competition.

Johnson was a right-handed batsman and played 606 innings in 351 first-class matches to make 14,286 runs. He scored 16 centuries with a top score of 154 and an average of 26.40. He was an occasional right-arm off-break bowler and took 21 first-class wickets with an average of 39.14 and a best performance of 3 for 12. He also stood in as wicket keeper for Bob Taylor and took two wickets by stumping in 1964.
