= Milles =

Milles is a surname. Notable people with the surname include:

- Carl Milles (1875–1955), Swedish sculptor
- Isaac Milles (1638 – 1720), English cleric
- George Milles, 1st Earl Sondes (1824–1894), British peer and Conservative politician
- George Milles-Lade, 2nd Earl Sondes (1861–1907), English cricketer, the son of the 1st Earl Sondes
- Henry Milles (cricketer) (1867–1937), English cricketer, the son of the 1st Earl Sondes
- Henry Milles-Lade, 5th Earl Sondes (1940–1996), the son of Henry Milles
- Olga Milles (1874–1967), Austrian-born Swedish painter
- Richard Milles (c. 1735 - 1820), English landowner and politician
- Ruth Milles (1873–1941), Swedish sculptor and writer
- Samuel Milles (1669–1729), MP for Canterbury
- Thomas Milles (bailiff) (1550?– 1627?), English customs official

== See also ==
- Millis (disambiguation)
