= George Milles =

George Milles may refer to:

- George Milles, 4th Baron Sondes (1794–1874)
- George Milles, 1st Earl Sondes (1824–1894), British politician
