= Henry Milles (cricketer) =

English cricketer

Personal information
- Full name: Henry Augustus Milles
- Born: 24 November 1867; Lees Court, Sheldwich, Faversham, Kent
- Died: 30 July 1937 (aged 69); Nash Court, Boughton under Blean, Faversham, Kent
- Batting: Right-handed
- Bowling: Right-arm off break
- Relatives: George Milles, 1st Earl Sondes (father); George Milles-Lade, 2nd Earl Sondes (brother); Henry Milles-Lade, 5th Earl Sondes (grandson); Francis Gore (brother-in-law)

Domestic team information
- Years: Team
- 1888–1897: Kent
- First-class debut: 26 July 1888 Kent v Notts
- Last First-class: 26 July 1897 Kent v Gentlemen of Philadelphia

Career statistics
Competition	First-class
Matches	4
Runs scored	24
Batting average	4.80
100s/50s	0/0
Top score	11
Balls bowled	181
Wickets	3
Bowling average	33.00
5 wickets in innings	0
10 wickets in match	0
Best bowling	1/16
Catches/stumpings	1/–
- Source: CricInfo, 8 December 2018

Henry Augustus Milles (24 November 1867 – 30 July 1937) was an English cricketer who played in four first-class cricket matches towards the end of the 19th century. Milles was a member of the Sondes family and was styled The Honourable Henry Augustus Milles from 1880 when the title was created for his father. In early 1900 he changed his surname to Henry Augustus Milles-Lade.

Milles was the fourth son of George Milles, 1st Earl Sondes. He born at the family seat, Lees Court at Sheldwich to the south of Faversham in Kent, and educated at Eton College and Trinity Hall, Cambridge. He did not play cricket for either team but his family were closely associated with Kent County Cricket Club throughout the 19th century and Milles played in two first-class matches for the county First XI, one in 1888 and one in 1897. He was elected to the club committee in 1902.

He played club cricket for amateur teams, primarily Eton Ramblers, and in 1891 toured North America with Lord Hawke's team, playing in both first-class matches on the tour against the Gentlemen of Philadelphia alongside his brother Viscount Throwley.

Milles was a captain in the Royal East Kent Yeomanry between 1898 and 1901. During the Second Boer War he was commissioned as an officer in the Imperial Yeomanry, and saw active service in South Africa. After he retired, he retained the rank of honorary lieutenant. He was magistrate and county councillor and in 1919 was High Sheriff of Kent.

Milles-Lade married Esther Benyon in 1912. The couple had five children, three daughters and two sons, one of who died as an infant. He died at his house at Nash Court at Boughton under Blean near Faversham in 1937 aged 69. At the time of his death he was the heir presumptive to the title of Lord Sondes, the title held by his brother, Lewis Arthur Milles, 3rd Earl Sondes. The title was inherited by Milles-Lade's son George in 1941.
