= Milli (disambiguation) =

Milli- is the SI prefix for one thousandth (10^{−3}, symbol m)

Milli may also refer to:

- Milli (rapper) (born 2002), Thai rapper
- Milli, a character in Team Umizoomi
- Birinci Milli, a village in Azerbaijan, also known as Milli
- "A Milli", a 2008 song by Lil Wayne
- Milli Bus, a government-run bus service operating across Afghanistan
- Milli Fire, wildfire in Oregon forest during the summer of 2017

== People with the given name Milli ==
- Milli Jannides (born 1986), Australian-born New Zealand artist
- Michael Milli Husein, South Sudanese politician

== People with the surname Milli ==
- Camillo Milli (born 1929), Italian stage, film and television actor
- Emin Milli (born 1979), Azerbaijani writer and human rights activist
- Matteo Milli (born 1989), Italian swimmer
- Robert Milli (born 1933), American television actor

== See also ==
- Milli Vanilli, German R&B duo from Munich consisting of Fab Morvan and Rob Pilatus
- Milli-Q, a trademark created by Millipore Corporation to describe 'ultrapure' water of "Type 1"
- Mili (disambiguation)
- Millie (disambiguation)
- Milly (disambiguation)
- Millis (disambiguation)
- Millis (surname)
