= Lord Hawke's cricket team in North America in 1891–92 =

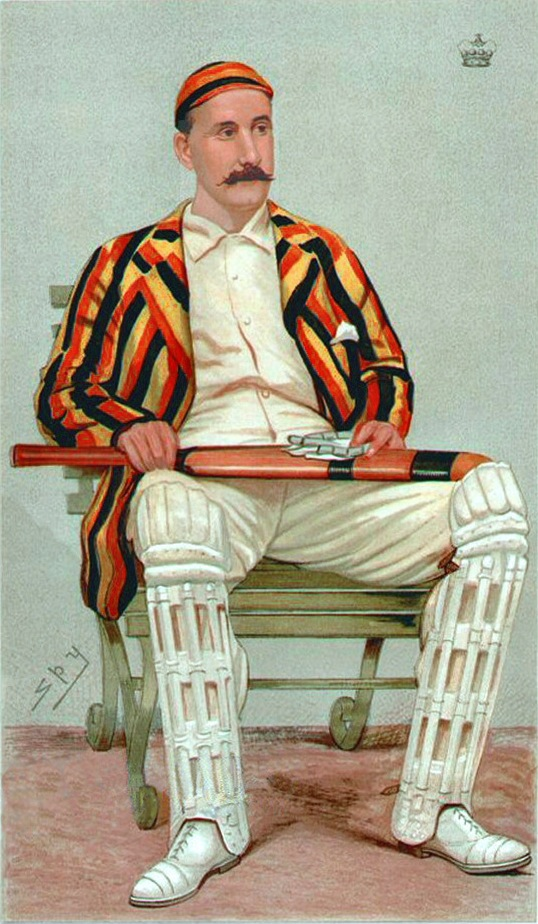
Caricature of Lord Hawke by Spy.

In the English winter of 1891–92, Lord Hawke led a touring party of English amateur cricketers on a tour of North America. During their tour they played eight matches, six in the United States of America and two in Canada. The tour contained two first-class fixtures, both contested against the Gentlemen of Philadelphia.

C.W. Alcock of Surrey originally intended to take the team, but finding himself unable to go had to find a successor. Lord Hawke took on the role of organising the tour. The team was weaker than he wished but the inclusion of Sammy Woods at the last hour considerably strengthened the bowling. Woods turned out to be the success of the tour, taking 76 wickets in the 8 matches at an average of 7, as well as scoring 260 runs.

== Touring party ==
Lord Hawke's Team in America.

Name	County	Birth date	Batting Style	Bowling Style	Refs
Lord Hawke (Captain)	Yorkshire	16 August 1860 (aged 31)	Right-handed	–	
Herbie Hewett	Somerset	25 May 1864 (aged 27)	Left-handed	Unknown arm medium	
George Hillyard	–	6 February 1864 (aged 27)	Right-handed	Right arm fast-medium	
John Hornsby	–	18 April 1860 (aged 31)	Right-handed	Slow left-arm orthodox	
Kingsmill Key	Surrey	11 October 1864 (aged 26)	Right-handed	Right arm off break	
Kenneth McAlpine	–	11 April 1858 (aged 33)	Right-handed	–	
Henry Milles	Kent	24 November 1867 (aged 23)	Right-handed	Right arm off break	
George Ricketts	–	2 June 1864 (aged 27)	Right-handed	Right arm medium	
Viscount Throwley	Kent	11 May 1861 (aged 30)	Right-handed	Right arm medium	
Sammy Woods	Somerset	13 April 1867 (aged 24)	Right-handed	Right arm fast-medium	
Charles Wreford-Brown	Gloucestershire	9 October 1866 (aged 24)	Right-handed	Right arm slow	
Charles Wright †	Nottinghamshire	27 May 1863 (aged 28)	Right-handed	–	

== Matches ==
=== First-class matches ===
The party left Liverpool on 16 September 1891, and during the voyage Herbie Hewett, George Ricketts and Charles Wreford-Brown suffered badly from seasickness. Sammy Woods, who was not affected by such ailments, attempted to get the three men to take dinner with him on the fourth evening. He served champagne and vegetable soup, but an American who was also suffering from nausea commented "Say steward, did you bring this up or did I?" None of Woods' three team-mates ate the dinner. The party landed in New York on the evening of 23 September and immediately made their way to Philadelphia for a half-day's practice before their first match.

25–28 September 1891
Scorecard

Lord Hawke's XI	v	Gentlemen of Philadelphia
259 (93.3 overs); Lord Hawke 74; Henry Brown 4/44 (23 overs)		248 (95 overs); George Patterson 68; Sammy Woods 3/65 (34 overs)
171 (59.4 overs); Herbie Hewett 49; Henry Brown 6/55 (27 overs)		183/2 (72.1 overs); Reynolds Brown 62*; Henry Milles 1/39 (11.1 overs)

Gentlemen of Philadelphia won by 8 wickets
Germantown Cricket Club Ground
Umpires: Unknown

1–2 October 1891
Scorecard

Gentlemen of Philadelphia	v	Lord Hawke's XI
56 (36.1 overs); Francis Brewster 11; Sammy Woods 8/32 (18.1 overs)		82 (32.1 overs); Lord Hawke 24; George Patterson 4/14 (8.1 overs)
119 (66.4 overs); Samuel Welsh 28; Sammy Woods 7/55 (32.4 overs)		95/6 (36.2 overs); Herbie Hewett 29; George Patterson 3/32 (15 overs)

Lord Hawke's XI won by 4 wickets
Germantown Cricket Club Ground
Umpires: Unknown

=== Match log ===
No.	Date	Opponents	Venue	Country	Result	Ref
1	5–7 October	All New York	Livingston Field, Staten Island	United States	Drawn	
2	9–10 October	Baltimore	Baltimore	United States	Won by an innings and 150 runs	
3	12–13 October	Boston Athletic Association	Boston	United States	Won by 242 runs	
4	16–17 October	Chicago	Chicago	United States	Won by an innings and 90 runs	
5	20–21 October	Western Ontario	Rosedale, Toronto	Canada	Won by an innings and 54 runs	
6	23–24 October	Eastern Ontario	Ottawa	Canada	Won by an innings and 84 runs	

== Bibliography ==
- James Lillywhite's Cricketers' Annual. 1892. pp. 24–33.
- Cricket: A Weekly Record of the Game. 1891. pp. 461–465, 472–473, 483.
- Woods, S.M.J. (1925). My Reminscences. London: Chapman and Hall Ltd.
