= George Sondes =

George Sondes may refer to:

- George Sondes, 1st Earl of Feversham (1599–1677), politician and peer
- George Milles, 1st Earl Sondes (1824–1894, politician and peer
