= Mili =

Mili may refer to:

== Film ==
- Mili (1975 film), a Bollywood romantic drama film directed by Hrishikesh Mukherjee
- Mili (2015 film), a Malayalam-language drama film directed by Rajesh Raman Pillai
- Mili (2022 film), a Bollywood survival thriller film directed by Mathukutty Xavier

== People ==
=== Surname ===
- Farhana Mili, Bangladeshi actress
- Itula Mili (born 1973), American football player
- Lamine Mili, American electrical engineer
- Mohamed Ezzedine Mili (1917–2013), Tunisian diplomat
- Stavroula Mili, Greek molecular biologist

=== Given name ===
- MILI (singer-songwriter), Indian singer-songwriter
- Mili Avital (born 1972), Israeli actress, writer, and director
- Mili Hadžiabdić (born 1963), Yugoslav footballer
- Mili Smith (born 1998), Scottish curler
- Mili Urién, fictional character in the Argentine telenovela Chiquititas
- Pili and Mili (born 1947), Spanish comic acting duo

== Other uses ==
- Mili (veil), a form of Chinese veil
- Mili (musical group), Japanese classical indie music group
- Mili Airport, public use airstrip in the Marshall Islands
- Mili Atoll, a coral atoll of 92 islands in the Pacific Ocean which forms a legislative district of the Ratak Chain of the Marshall Islands
- Mili language, a Loloish language spoken in Jingdong County
- Mili Pictures Worldwide, a Shanghai feature film animation company
- Mili, a colloquial Spanish term for conscription in Spain

== See also ==
- Milli (disambiguation)
- Millis (disambiguation)
- Miilee, a 2005 Indian soap opera
