= Francis Gore (cricketer) =

English cricketer and British Army officer

Personal information
- Full name: Francis William George Gore
- Born: 22 June 1855; Newton St Loe, Somerset, England
- Died: 17 July 1938 (aged 83); Victoria, London, England
- Batting: Unknown
- Relatives: Viscount Throwley (brother-in-law); Henry Milles (brother-in-law)

Career statistics
Competition	First-class
Matches	1
Runs scored	0
Batting average	0.00
100s/50s	–/–
Top score	0*
Catches/stumpings	2/–
- Source: Cricinfo, 19 September 2019

Col. Francis William George Gore DL TD (22 June 1855 – 17 July 1938) was a British Army officer and first-class cricketer.

== Early life and education ==
Gore was born in Somerset at Newton St Loe, into the aristocratic Gore family of Ango-Irish origin. He was the only son of Rev. George Gore and his wife, Frances Anne Rous, granddaughter of George Rous.

He was educated at Harrow School, before going up to Christ Church, Oxford. Gore was also a student of the Inner Temple, but was never called to the bar.

== Cricket ==
He made a single appearance in first-class cricket when he played for I Zingari against Yorkshire in the Scarborough Festival of 1881. Batting twice in the match, he was dismissed without scoring by Edmund Peate in the I Zingari first-innings, while in their second-innings of 236 all out he was unbeaten without scoring.

== Military career ==
Gore was a lieutenant in the North Somerset Yeomanry, a Yeomanry regiment based in the county. He volunteered for active service in the Second Boer War, and on 18 April 1900 was commissioned a lieutenant in the Imperial Yeomanry, serving in the 20th Battalion which departed Southampton for South Africa on board the SS Canada in the middle of April 1900. Promotion to the rank of captain followed in January 1901, and to major the following April. Gore later transferred to the City of London Yeomanry in April 1908, with promotion to the honorary rank of lieutenant colonel coming shortly before his transfer in March 1908. Gore served in the First World War, obtaining the full rank of lieutenant colonel in November 1914, before reverting shortly after at his own request to the rank of major and honorary lieutenant colonel. He was again promoted to the rank of lieutenant colonel in January 1917, antedated to June 1916. He retired from active service in February 1920, having reached the age limit for service, at which point he was decorated with the Territorial Decoration.

He served as the deputy lieutenant of Monmouthshire in 1889–90. He also served during his life as a justice of the peace for Glamorgan.

== Personal life ==
Gore married Lady Constance Grace Milles, the daughter of George Milles, 1st Earl Sondes, in October 1885. They had three children: Christopher Gerald Gore, Violet Gladys Gore, and Crystal Gloria Gore. Through his son, he is the ancestor of Georgina Fitzalan-Howard, Duchess of Norfolk (née Gore) and Henry Fitzalan-Howard, Earl of Arundel, heir to the Duke of Norfolk.

His brothers-in-law, Henry Milles and George Milles-Lade, both played first-class cricket.

Gore died in July 1938 at Victoria, London. He was survived by his wife and three of their four children.
