= LCDR Sondes class =

Sondes class
Type and origin
- Power type: Steam
- Designer: Thomas Russell Crampton
- Builder: R. & W. Hawthorn & Co.
- Serial number: 1006–1011
- Build date: 1857-1858
- Total produced: 6
Specifications
- Configuration
  - Whyte: 4-4-0ST
  - UIC: 2′B n2t
- Gauge: 4 ft 8 1/2 in (1,435 mm)
- Coupled dia.: 5 ft 6 in (1.676 m)
- Cylinders: Two, outside
- Cylinder size: 15 in × 20 in (381 mm × 508 mm)
Career
- Operators: East Kent Railway; London, Chatham and Dover Railway
- Delivered: November 1857 – March 1858
- Disposition: All rebuilt to Second Sondes class

The LCDR Sondes class was a class of six steam locomotives of the 4-4-0ST wheel arrangement. They were designed by Thomas Russell Crampton for the East Kent Railway (EKR) to specifications prepared by Joseph Cubitt. An order was placed in March 1857 with R. & W. Hawthorn & Co. for six locomotives at £2,700 each; they were delivered to the EKR between November 1857 and March 1858. The first section of the EKR (between Chatham and Faversham) opened on 25 January 1858; and the EKR became the London, Chatham and Dover Railway (LCDR) in 1859.

The locomotives were prone to frequent failure: at one point before the sixth had been received, the first five were all out of service simultaneously. The LCDR asked Daniel Gooch of the Great Western Railway to report on the condition of the locomotives; he found that there were a number of significant problems with the design. The Sondes class were all laid aside as unfit for use in mid-1863, and during 1865, all six were rebuilt by the LCDR as 2-4-0T, becoming the Second Sondes class.

Like other EKR/LCDR locomotives delivered prior to 1874, the locomotives had no numbers, being distinguished by name.

Name	Works no.	Built	Rebuilt
Lake	1006	November 1857	August 1865
Sondes	1007	December 1857	October 1865
Faversham	1008	February 1858	November 1865
Chatham	1009	February 1858	September 1865
Sittingbourne	1010	March 1858	September 1865
Crampton	1011	March 1858	November 1865

Three of the locomotives (Faversham, Chatham and Sittingbourne) were named after places served by the EKR. The other three were named after people involved in the EKR: James Lake and Lord Sondes were directors, whilst T. R. Crampton, besides being the designer of the class, was also the engineer of the EKR.
