= Lewis Watson, 2nd Baron Sondes =

British Whig politician and peer

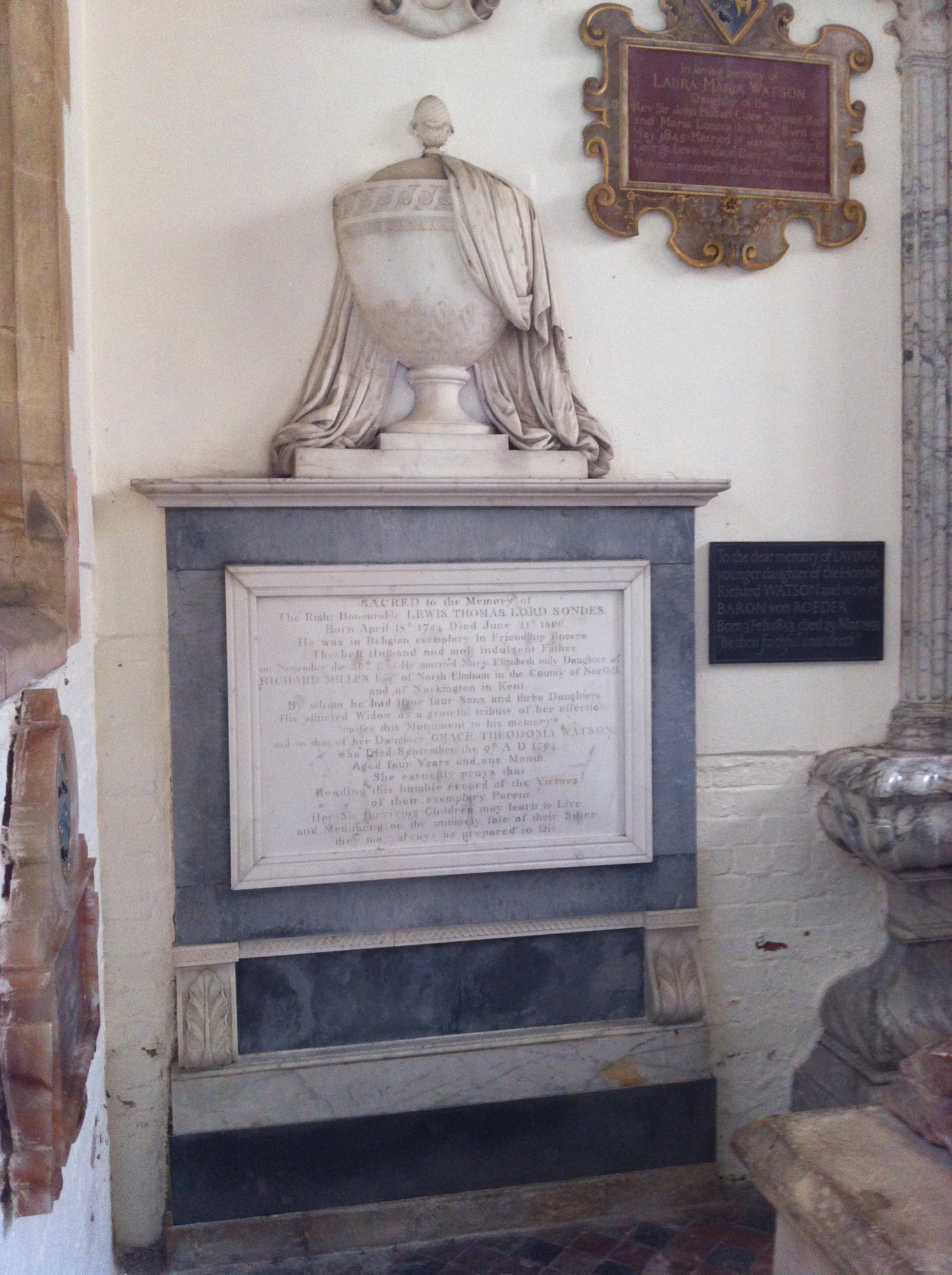
Memorial to Lewis Thomas Watson, 2nd Baron Sondes, in St Leonard's Church, Rockingham

Lewis Thomas Watson, 2nd Baron Sondes (18 April 1754 – 21 June 1806), was a British Whig politician and peer.

== Early life ==
Lewis Thomas Watson was the son of Lewis Watson, 1st Baron Sondes, and Grace Pelham, a daughter of Henry Pelham. He was educated at Eton between 1765 and 1771.

== Career ==
In 1774, his father's old friend (and first cousin twice removed), Lord Rockingham, offered Sondes a seat in Parliament for Lewis at Pontefract; however, Sondes declined due to the price of £3,500 asked by the borough's patron, Lord Galway. In 1775, the death of Sir Charles Saunders left a vacancy at Hedon. Rockingham did not wish to lose the seat to the Government, and recommended Watson as a candidate to Saunders' election manager, William Iveson, who had inherited Saunders' interest in the borough. However, the by-election in January 1776 was contested by Christopher Atkinson, and proved unexpectedly expensive; Sondes paid £3,600 and complained to Rockingham when bills came for a further £1,200 later in the year.

Watson was a faithful member of Rockingham's opposition to the North ministry, but never spoke in the Commons. He put himself forth as a candidate for Kent in 1780 but withdrew on finding that he was not supported in the county. At the 1784 election, he stood for Seaford on the long-dormant Pelham interest against the Treasury candidates. Defeated by one vote, he lodged an election petition holding that the bailiff had not given the four days notice required of the election, and the election was voided in 1785, although he did not stand there again.

Without his knowledge, he was put in as a Whig candidate at Canterbury at the 1790 election, but finished at the bottom of the poll. Watson was appointed a deputy lieutenant of Northamptonshire in April 1793, and of Kent on 29 June.

=== Peerage ===
In 1795, he succeeded to his father's title and assumed his seat in the House of Lords. Sondes sold the manor of Garthorpe, Leicestershire to Wilbraham Tollemache, 6th Earl of Dysart in 1803.

=== Militia activities ===
On 19 May 1798, he was commissioned Colonel of the Kent Supplementary Militia. This was converted into the 3rd Kent Militia, and he was breveted colonel in the Army on 13 October, his rank to last while the militia remained embodied. When a number of volunteer regiments were raised after the breakdown of the Peace of Amiens, Sondes was commissioned lieutenant-colonel commandant of the Lees Court Volunteer Infantry on 27 September 1803, and colonel of the 2nd East Kent or Lath of Scray and Wingham Regiment of Local Militia on 20 October. He held the colonelcy of the latter until his death, when he was succeeded by George Harris.

== Family ==
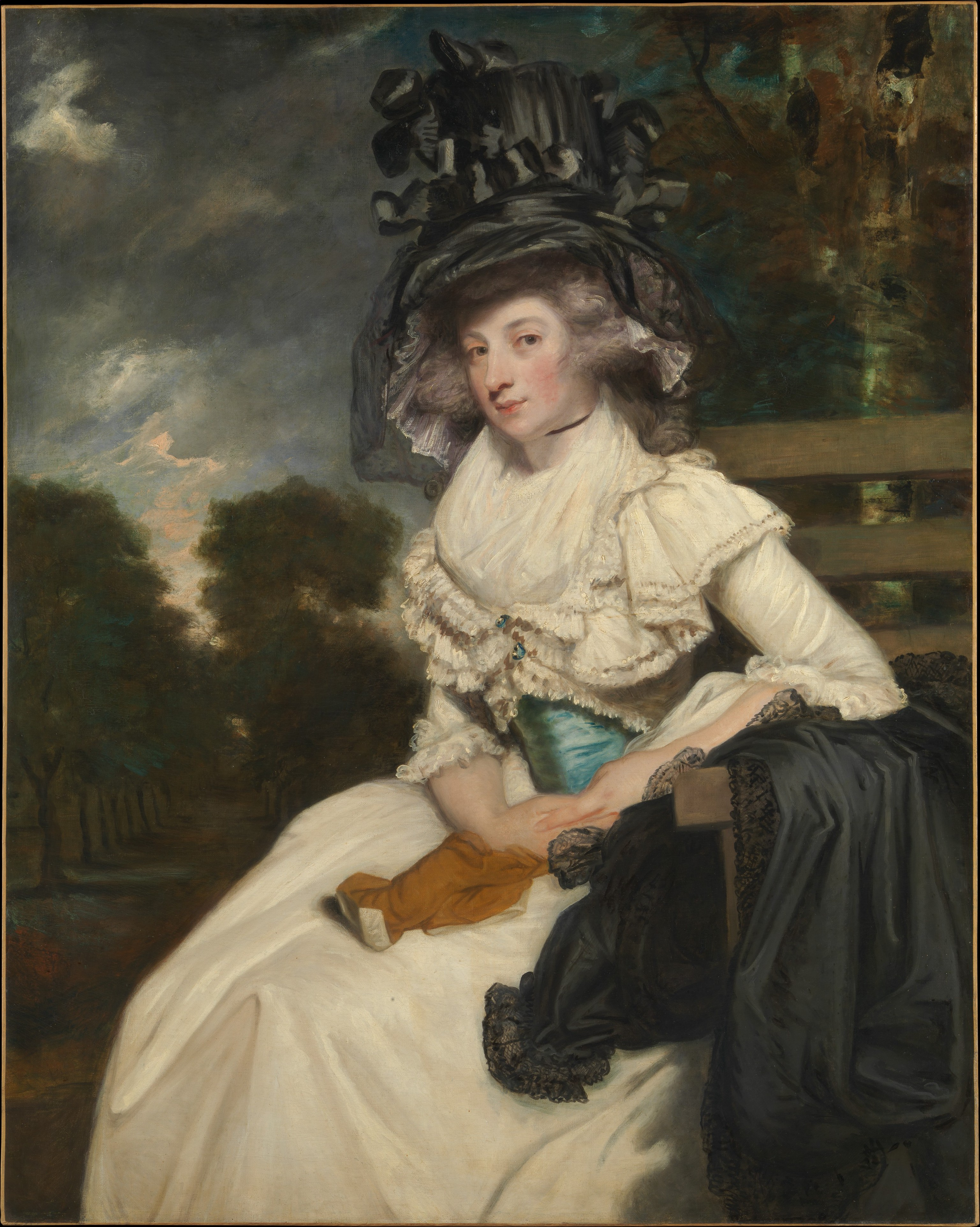
Portrait of his wife, Mary Elizabeth Milles, by Sir Joshua Reynolds, 1789, at the Metropolitan Museum of Art

On 30 November 1785, he married Mary Elizabeth Milles (1767–1818), only daughter and heiress of Richard Milles (c. 1735 – 1820), a Member of Parliament for Canterbury from 1761 to 1780. They had seven children:

- Hon. Mary Grace Watson (29 December 1786 – 24 November 1853), married Sir John Henry Palmer, 7th Baronet, on 3 May 1808
- Grace Theodosia Watson (1 August 1790 – 9 September 1794)
- Lewis Watson, 3rd Baron Sondes (1792–1836)
- George Milles, 4th Baron Sondes (1794–1874)
- Hon. Rev. Henry Watson (10 August 1796 – 23 September 1849)
- Hon. Richard Watson (1800–1852)
- Hon. Catherine Watson (10 June 1802 – 24 November 1884), married William de Capell Brooke on 23 April 1829

He was succeeded by his son, Lewis Watson, when he died on 21 June 1806. Sondes was buried at Rockingham, Northamptonshire.

Parliament of Great Britain
Preceded by Sir Charles Saunders; Beilby Thompson	Member of Parliament for Hedon; 1776–1780; With: Beilby Thompson	Succeeded by Christopher Atkinson Saville; William Chaytor
Peerage of Great Britain
Preceded by Lewis Watson	Baron Sondes; 1795–1806	Succeeded by Lewis Watson
