= Earl Sondes =

Earldom in the Peerage of the United Kingdom

Earl Sondes, of Lees Court in the County of Kent, was a title in the Peerage of the United Kingdom. It was created in 1880 for the former Conservative Member of Parliament for East Kent, George Milles, 5th Baron Sondes. He was made Viscount Throwley, of the County of Kent, at the same time, which title was used as a courtesy title by the eldest son and heir apparent of the Earl.

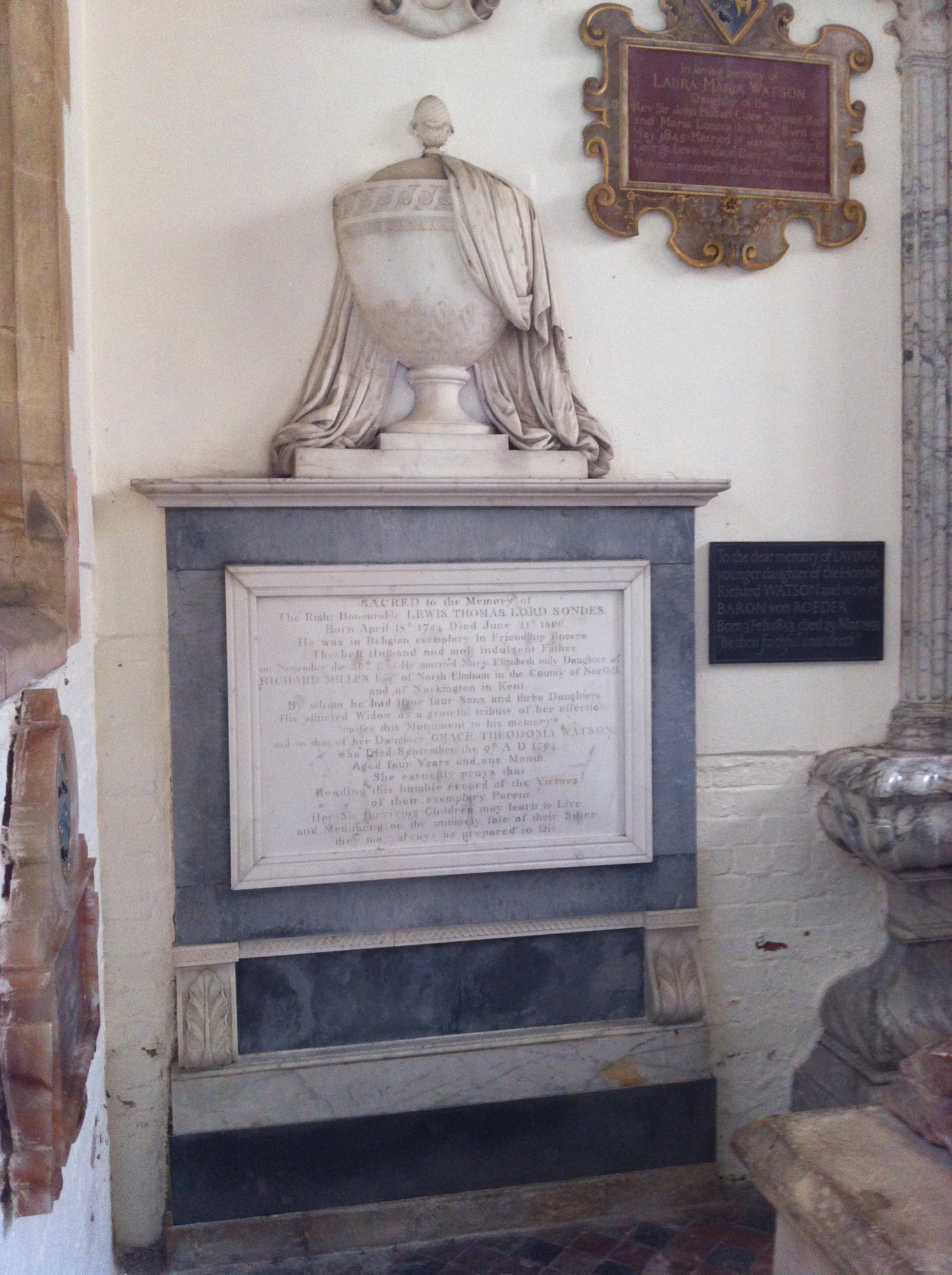
Memorial to Lewis Thomas Watson, 2nd Baron Sondes, in St. Leonard's Church, Rockingham

The title of Baron Sondes, of Lees Court in the County of Kent, was created in the Peerage of Great Britain in 1760 for Lewis Watson. Born the Hon. Lewis Monson, he was the second son of John Monson, 1st Baron Monson, and his wife Lady Margaret Watson, youngest daughter of Lewis Watson, 1st Earl of Rockingham (see these titles for earlier history of the families). In 1746 he assumed the surname of Watson on succeeding to the estates of his cousin, Thomas Watson, 3rd Earl of Rockingham (who was also Viscount Sondes). His son, the second Baron, represented Hedon in the House of Commons. His younger son, the fourth Baron, who succeeded his brother in 1836, assumed in 1820 by Royal licence the surname of Milles only. On his death the title passed to his son, the aforementioned fifth Baron, who was created Earl Sondes in 1880.

The sister of the 4th Earl Sondes, Lady Isobel Milles-Lade (d.1990), was married to the 18th Earl of Derby, of Knowsley Hall, Lancashire.

The family seat of the Earls Sondes was Lees Court, in the village of Sheldwich, three miles south of Faversham. The Lees Court Estate is today owned by the Countess Sondes, widow of the 5th and last Earl Sondes. Lees Court itself was entirely destroyed by fire in November 1910, but was carefully rebuilt and is now subdivided into private apartments. The Estate during the early 1900s was 85,000 acres. Today the Estate is 7,000 acres which includes the Swale Estuary and the Faversham and Oare Creeks.

== Barons Sondes (1760) ==
- Lewis Watson, 1st Baron Sondes (1728–1795)
- Lewis Thomas Watson, 2nd Baron Sondes (1754–1806)
- Lewis Richard Watson, 3rd Baron Sondes (1792–1836)
- George John Milles, 4th Baron Sondes (1794–1874)
- George Watson Milles, 5th Baron Sondes (1824–1894) (created Earl Sondes in 1880)

== Earls Sondes (1880) ==
- George Watson Milles, 1st Earl Sondes (1824–1894)
- George Edward Milles-Lade, 2nd Earl Sondes (1861–1907), died without male issue
- Lewis Arthur Milles, 3rd Earl Sondes (1866–1941), died without male issue
- George Henry Milles, 4th Earl Sondes (1914–1970), son of Henry Milles.
- Henry George Herbert Milles-Lade, 5th Earl Sondes (1940–1996)

== Arms ==
Coat of arms of Earl Sondes

Coronet
A Coronet of an Earl
Crest
1st: A Leopard's Head affrontée erased Sable bezantée charged on the neck with two Cross Crosslets fitchée in saltire Or (Lade); 2nd: A Lion rampant Erminois holding between the paws a Fer-de-moulin Sable (Milles)
Escutcheon
Quarterly: 1st and 4th, Argent on a Fess wavy between three Escallops Sable two Cross Crosslets fitchée in saltire Or (Lade); 2nd and 3rd, Ermine a Fer-de-moulin between two Martlets in pale Sable on a Chief engrailed Azure two Marlion's Wings conjoined Or (Milles)
Supporters
Dexter: A Griffin Argent gorged with a Marquess's Coronet Or; Sinister: A Bear proper gorged with a Belt Argent thereon two Crescents Buckle and Pendant Or
Motto
Esto Quod Esse Videris (Be what you seem to be)

== See also ==
- Baron Monson
- Viscount Monson
- Monson baronets
- Earl of Rockingham
- Earl of Feversham
