= LCDR Second Sondes class =

Class of locomotives

Second Sondes class
Type and origin
- Power type: Steam
- Designer: William Martley
- Rebuilder: Longhedge works
- Rebuild date: 1865
- Number rebuilt: 6
Specifications
- Configuration
  - Whyte: 2-4-0T
- Gauge: 4 ft 8 1/2 in (1,435 mm)
- Leading dia.: 3 ft 6 in (1.07 m)
- Coupled dia.: 5 ft 6 in (1.68 m)
- Wheelbase
  - Engine: 15 ft 0 in (4.57 m)
- Frame type: Double
- Loco weight: 31.8 long tons (32.3 t)
- Fuel capacity: 1 1/4 long tons (1.3 t)
- Water cap.: 715 imp gal (3,250 L; 859 US gal)
- Firebox
  - Grate area: 16 1/2 sq ft (1.53 m^{2})
- Boiler
  - Diameter: 4 ft 1 in (1.24 m)
  - Tube plates: 10 ft 1 in (3.07 m)
  - Small tubes: 152 x 2 in (51 mm)
- Boiler pressure: 120 psi (830 kPa)
- Heating surface
  - Firebox: 75 sq ft (7.0 m^{2})
  - Tubes: 820 sq ft (76 m^{2})
  - Total surface: 895 sq ft (83.1 m^{2})
- Cylinders: 2, inside
- Cylinder size: 15 in × 24 in (380 mm × 610 mm)
Career
- Operators: London, Chatham and Dover Railway; South Eastern and Chatham Railway
- Class: F
- Numbers: LCDR: 59–64; SECR: 518–523
- Withdrawn: 1909
- Disposition: All scrapped

The LCDR Second Sondes class was a class of six 2-4-0T steam locomotives. They were designed by William Martley for the London, Chatham and Dover Railway (LCDR), and built at the LCDR's Longhedge works during 1865, using components from the Sondes class 4-4-0ST locomotives, including the boilers.

In November 1875, William Kirtley (who had replaced Martley following the latter's death in 1874) allotted the class letter F. During 1876–78, the locomotives were rebuilt with new boilers and cylinders; at the same time they were given numbers, the names being removed. They passed to the South Eastern and Chatham Railway (SECR) at the start of 1899, and their numbers were increased by 459 to avoid duplication with former South Eastern Railway locomotives. New boilers were again provided in 1905–07, but all six locomotives were withdrawn in 1909.

| Name | Built | LCDR Number | SECR Number | Reboilered | Withdrawn |
|---|---|---|---|---|---|
| Lake | August 1865 | 62 | 521 | December 1876, July 1905 | August 1909 |
| Chatham | September 1865 | 64 | 523 | August 1877, January 1906 | September 1909 |
| Sittingbourne | September 1865 | 60 | 519 | November 1876, December 1907 | July 1909 |
| Sondes | October 1865 | 59 | 518 | January 1878, January 1907 | July 1909 |
| Faversham | November 1865 | 63 | 522 | September 1877, June 1907 | September 1909 |
| Crampton | November 1865 | 61 | 520 | December 1876, August 1907 | August 1909 |

The names were all retained from the Sondes class.
