= George Milles-Lade, 2nd Earl Sondes =

English cricketer and aristocrat

Viscount Throwley
Personal information
- Full name: George Henry Milles-Lade
- Born: 11 May 1861; Lees Court, Sheldwich, Faversham, Kent
- Died: 1 October 1907 (aged 46); Marylebone, London
- Batting: Right-handed
- Bowling: Right-arm medium
- Relatives: George Milles, 1st Earl Sondes (father); Henry Milles (brother); Francis Gore (brother-in-law)

Domestic team information
- Years: Team
- 1882–1884: Kent
- First-class debut: 12 June 1882 Kent v Yorkshire
- Last First-class: 1 October 1891 Lord Hawke's XI v Gentlemen of Philadelphia

Career statistics
Competition	First-class
Matches	8
Runs scored	168
Batting average	16.80
100s/50s	0/1
Top score	82
Balls bowled	200
Wickets	5
Bowling average	25.00
5 wickets in innings	0
10 wickets in match	0
Best bowling	3/29
Catches/stumpings	7/–
- Source: CricInfo, 8 December 2018

George Edward Milles-Lade, 2nd Earl Sondes (11 May 1861 – 1 October 1907), styled Viscount Throwley from 1880 to 1894, was an English aristocrat and amateur cricketer. He was the eldest son of George Milles, 1st Earl Sondes, and succeeded as the 2nd Earl in September 1894. He was born at Lees Court at Sheldwich south of Faversham in Kent in 1861.

== Cricket ==
Educated at Eton College and Magdalene College, Cambridge, Milles-Lade was in the Eton cricket team in 1879 and 1880. In 1882 he made his first-class cricket debut for Kent County Cricket Club against Yorkshire at Sheffield, the first of six matches he played for the county, four in 1882 and two in 1884. He played regularly in club cricket for teams such as I Zingari and Band of Brothers, a club closely associated with Kent. He was elected President of the county club in 1891 and in the same year toured North America with Lord Hawke's team. He played in the two matches against the Gentlemen of Philadelphia.

Milles-Lade's brother, Henry Milles, also played occasionally for Kent as well as on Lord Hawke's American tour. His father had also been a keen cricketer, playing in a single first-class game for the Gentlemen of Kent in 1849. The family were closely associated with Kent cricket throughout the 19th century.

== Military service and death ==
Milles-Lade served in the Second Boer War with the Royal East Kent Yeomanry where he was shot and wounded. His health suffered due to pleurisy contracted as a result of the wound and he required repeated operations. He died aged 46 from heart failure following an operation in October 1907. He was unmarried and he was succeeded as Lord Sondes by his brother Lewis Arthur Milles, 3rd Earl Sondes.

== Bibliography ==
- Carlaw, Derek (2020). Kent County Cricketers, A to Z: Part One (1806–1914) (PDF). Cardiff: ACS.

Peerage of the United Kingdom
Preceded by George Milles	Earl Sondes; 1894–1907	Succeeded by Lewis Milles
