= North Street, Kent =

Hamlet in Kent, England

Coordinates: 51.285°N 0.8854°E

North Street
- Location within Kent
- OS grid reference: TR013579
- Civil parish: Sheldwich
- District: Swale
- Shire county: Kent
- Region: South East
- Country: England
- Sovereign state: United Kingdom
- Post town: Faversham
- Postcode district: ME13 0
- Police: Kent
- Fire: Kent
- Ambulance: South East Coast

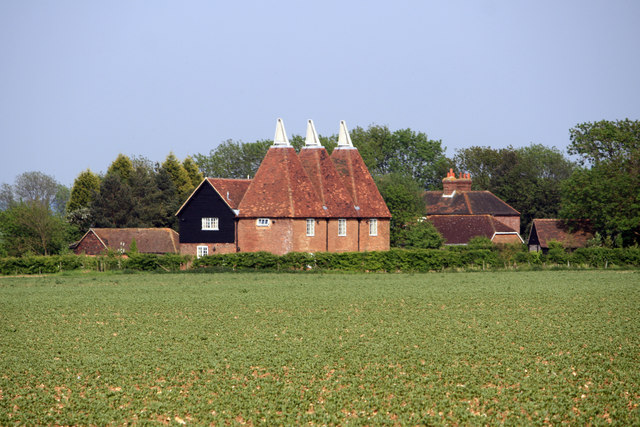

North Street is a hamlet two miles (3.2 km) south of Faversham in Kent, England. The hamlet lies on the A251 road immediately south of its crossing of the M2 motorway. It is in the civil parish of Sheldwich.
