= 3rd Troop of Horse Guards =

The 3rd Troop of Horse Guards was formed in 1658 as the 2nd, or The Duke of York's Troop of Horse Guards from followers of Charles II in exile in Holland. In 1670, it became the 3rd Troop of Horse Guards and was absorbed by the 1st Troop of Horse Guards in 1746.

== Colonels and former names of the 3rd Troop of Horse Guards ==
- 1658-1660 Unknown
- 1660-1665 Col. Charles, Earl of Falmouth —Berkeley's or Earl of Falmouth's Horse Guards
- 1665-1685 Lt-Gen. Louis, Earl of Feversham —Duras' or Earl of Feversham's Horse Guards
- 1685-1688 Gen. John, Baron Churchill —Churchill's Horse Guards
- 1688-1689 Lt-Gen. James, Duke of Berwick —FitzJames's or Duke of Berwick's Horse Guards
- 1689-1692 Gen. John, Earl of Marlborough (reappointed) —Earl of Marlborough's Horse Guards
- 1692-1703 Gen. Richard, Earl Rivers —Savage's or Lord Colchester's or Earl Rivers' Horse Guards
- 1703-1715 Lt-Gen. Charles, Earl of Arran —Earl of Arran's Horse Guards
- 1715-1733 Gen. George, Earl of Cholmondeley —Earl of Cholmondeley's Horse Guards
- 1733-1745 Gen. Willem, Earl of Albemarle —Keppel's or Earl of Albemarle's Horse Guards
- 1745-1746 F.M. James, Baron Tyrawley —O'Hara's or Lord Tyrawley's Horse Guards
