= Earl of Feversham =

Earldom in the Peerage of Great Britain

Earl of Feversham is a title that has been created three times (the second time as Countess of Feversham), once in the Peerage of England, once in the Peerage of Great Britain and once in the Peerage of the United Kingdom. All three creations are now extinct.

The first creation came in the Peerage of England in 1676 when Sir George Sondes was made Viscount Sondes and Earl of Feversham. Sondes had already been created Baron Throwley in 1676. The second Earl had already been created Baron Duras in the Peerage of England in 1673 by the time he succeeded to the earldom in 1677. However, all the titles became extinct on his death in 1709.

The second creation came in the Peerage of Great Britain in 1719, when Ehrengard Melusine von der Schulenburg, Duchess of Munster was made Countess of Feversham. She was created Baroness Glastonbury and Duchess of Kendal at the same time. The titles were for life only and became extinct on her death in 1743.

The third creation came in the Peerage of the United Kingdom in 1868 when William Ernest Duncombe, 3rd Baron Feversham, was made Viscount Helmsley, of Helmsley in the North Riding of the County of York, and Earl of Feversham, of Ryedale in the North Riding of the County of York. For more information on this creation, see the Baron Feversham.

== Earls of Feversham, First Creation (1676) ==
- George Sondes, 1st Earl of Feversham (1600–1677)
- Louis de Duras, 2nd Earl of Feversham (1641–1709)

== Countesses of Feversham, Second Creation (1719) ==
- Ehrengard Melusine von der Schulenburg, Duchess of Munster and Kendal, Countess of Feversham (1667–1743)

== Earls of Feversham, Third Creation (1868) ==
- see the Baron Feversham

== See also ==
- Earl of Rockingham
- Earl Sondes
