= Millis =

Millis may refer to:

- Millis (surname)
- Millis, Massachusetts, a town in Norfolk County, Massachusetts, United States
  - Millis (MBTA station), a former train station in that town
    - Millis Branch, a rail line formerly ending at that station
  - Millis High School
- Millis, Syria, a village in Syria

== See also ==
- Millis-Clicquot, Massachusetts, a census-designated place in Millis, Massachusetts
- Milles
- Milli (disambiguation)
