= 1st Troop of Horse Guards =

c. 1672 portrait of a regimental lieutenant colonel

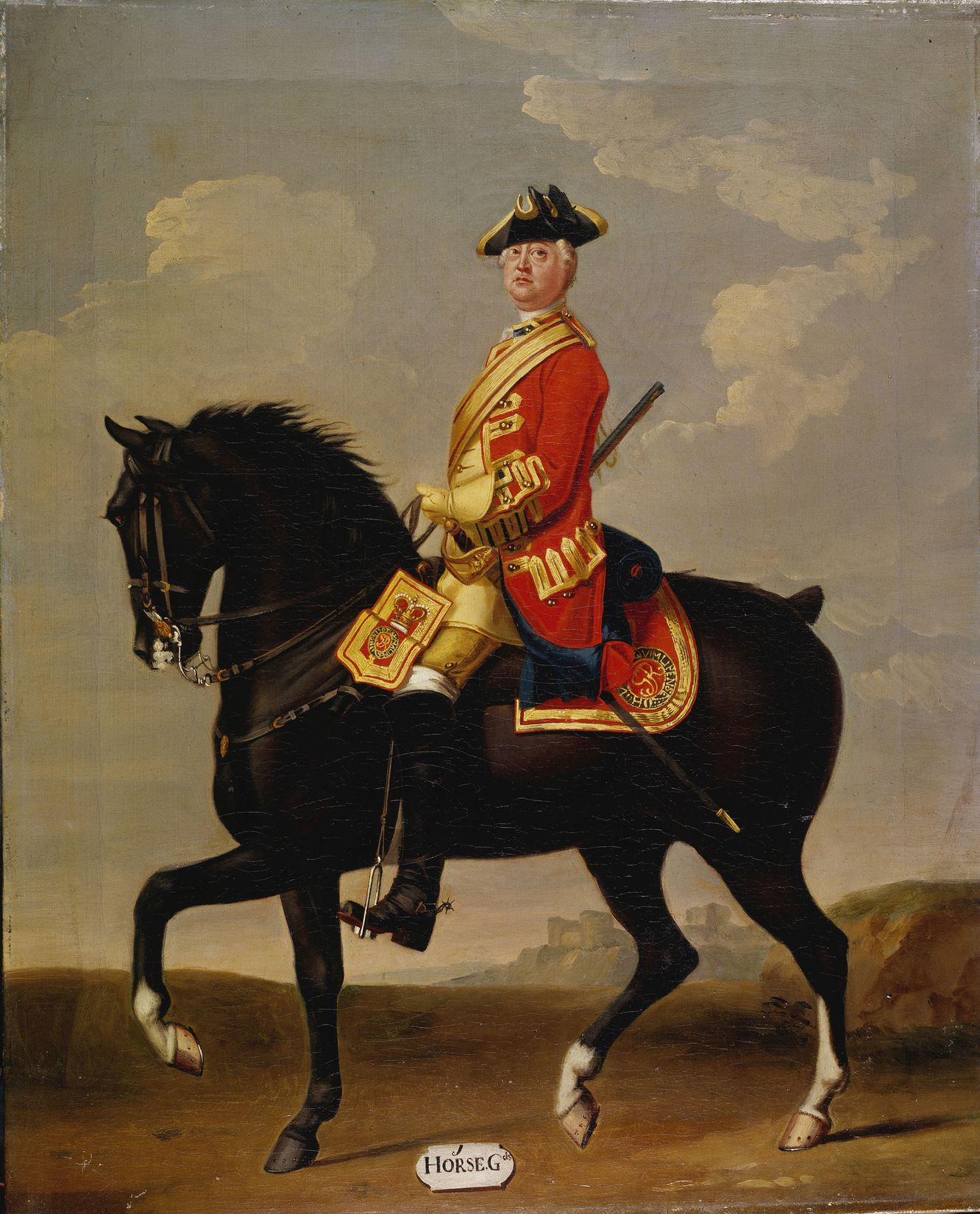
c. 1751 painting of a regimental private

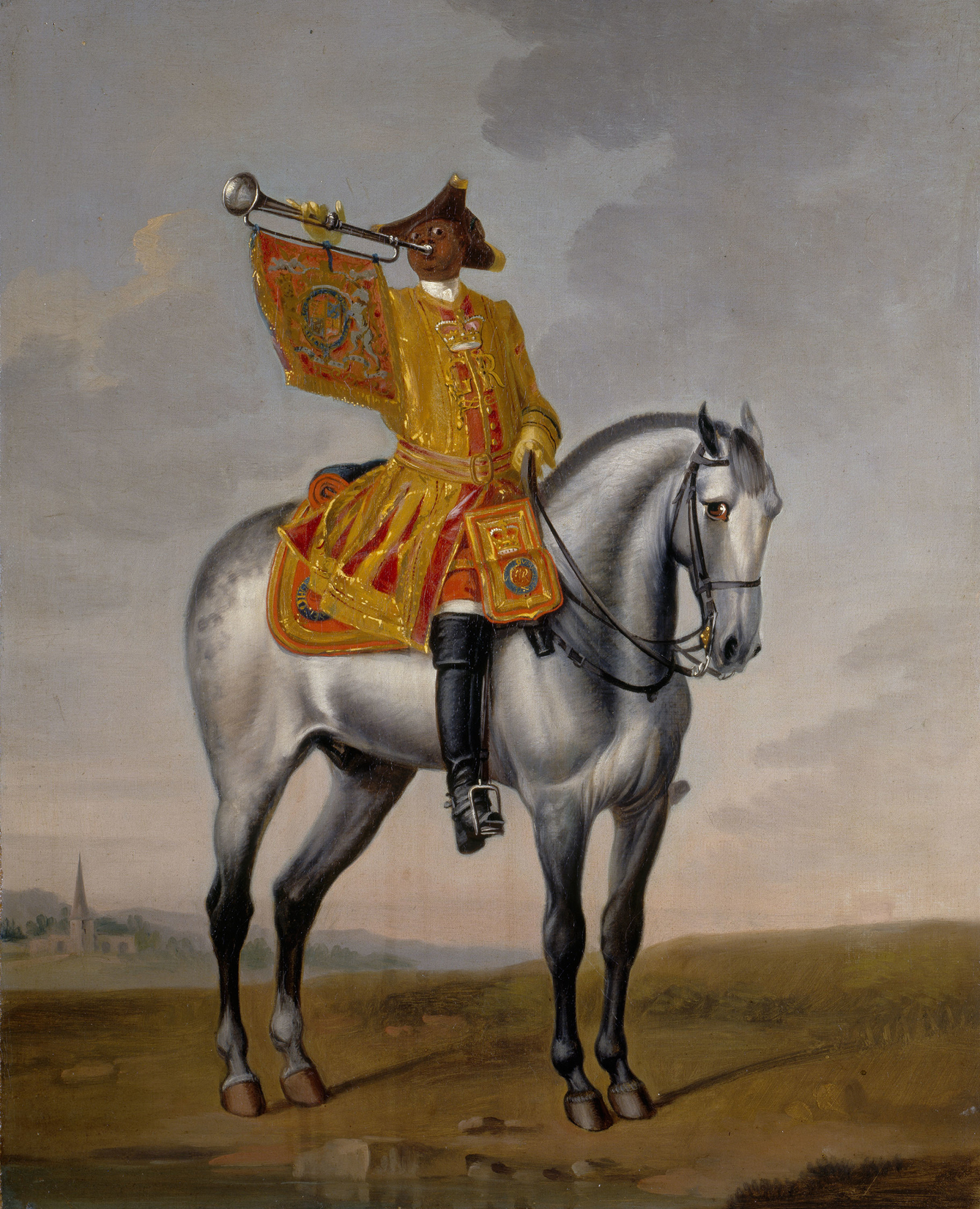
c. 1750 painting of a regimental trumpeter

The 1st (His Majesty's Own) Troop of Horse Guards was formed from King Charles II's exiled followers in the Netherlands (the Stuart monarchs had been overthrown during the English Civil War, and replaced with the Commonwealth). The regiment was formed in 1658, and became part of the English Army in 1661. It fought at Dettingen, along with four other troops of the Royal Horse Guards, and eventually absorbed the 3rd Troop of Horse Guards and the 1st Troop, Horse Grenadier Guards. On 25 June 1788, the regiment became the 1st Regiment of Life Guards.

== Colonels and former names of the 1st Troop, Horse Guards ==
- 1660 Charles, Baron Gerard —Lord Gerard's Horse Guards
  (17 May 1660 - 16 September 1668)
- 1668 James, Duke of Monmouth —Duke of Monmouth's Horse Guards
  (16 September 1668 - 29 November 1679)
- 1679 Christopher, Duke of Albemarle —Monck's or Duke of Albemarle's Horse Guards
  (29 November 1679 - 1 August 1685)
- 1685 Louis, Earl of Feversham —Duras' or Earl of Feversham's Horse Guards
  (1 August 1685 - 2 April 1689)
- 1689 Richard, Viscount Lumley —Lord Lumley's or Earl of Scarbrough's Horse Guards
  (2 April 1689 - 9 March 1699)
- 1699 Arnold, Earl of Albemarle —Keppel's or Earl of Albemarle's Horse Guards
  (9 March 1699 - 26 July 1710)
- 1710 Henry, Earl of Portland —Bentinck's or Earl of Portland's Horse Guards
  (26 July 1710 -7 July 1713)
- 1713 John, Baron Ashburnham —Ashburnham's Horse Guards
  (7 July 1713 - 10 May 1715)
- 1715 John Montagu, 2nd Duke of Montagu —Duke of Montagu's Horse Guards
  (10 May 1715 - 20 September 1721)
- 1721 Henry, Lord Herbert —Herbert's or Earl of Pembroke's Horse Guards
  (20 September 1721 - 4 July 1733)
- 1733 John, Baron Catherlough —Lord Catherlough's or Earl of Westmorland's Horse Guards
  (4 July 1733 - 21 June 1737)
- 1737 John, Duke of Montagu —Duke of Montagu's Horse Guards
  (21 June 1737 - 30 August 1737)
- 1737 John, Baron De La Warr —West's or (1st) Earl De La Warr's Horse Guards
  (30 August 1737 - 16 March 1766)

in 1746 absorbed 3rd Troop of Horse Guards

On 1 July 1751 a royal warrant provided that in future regiments would not be known by their colonels' names, but by their "number or rank".

- 1766 John, Earl De La Warr
  (21 March 1766 - 12 December 1777)
- 1777 William, Marquess of Lothian
  (12 December 1777 - 25 June 1788)

in 1788 absorbed 1st Troop, Horse Grenadier Guards

On 25 June 1788 became 1st Regiment of Life Guards
