= Lewis Watson, 3rd Baron Sondes =

English peer

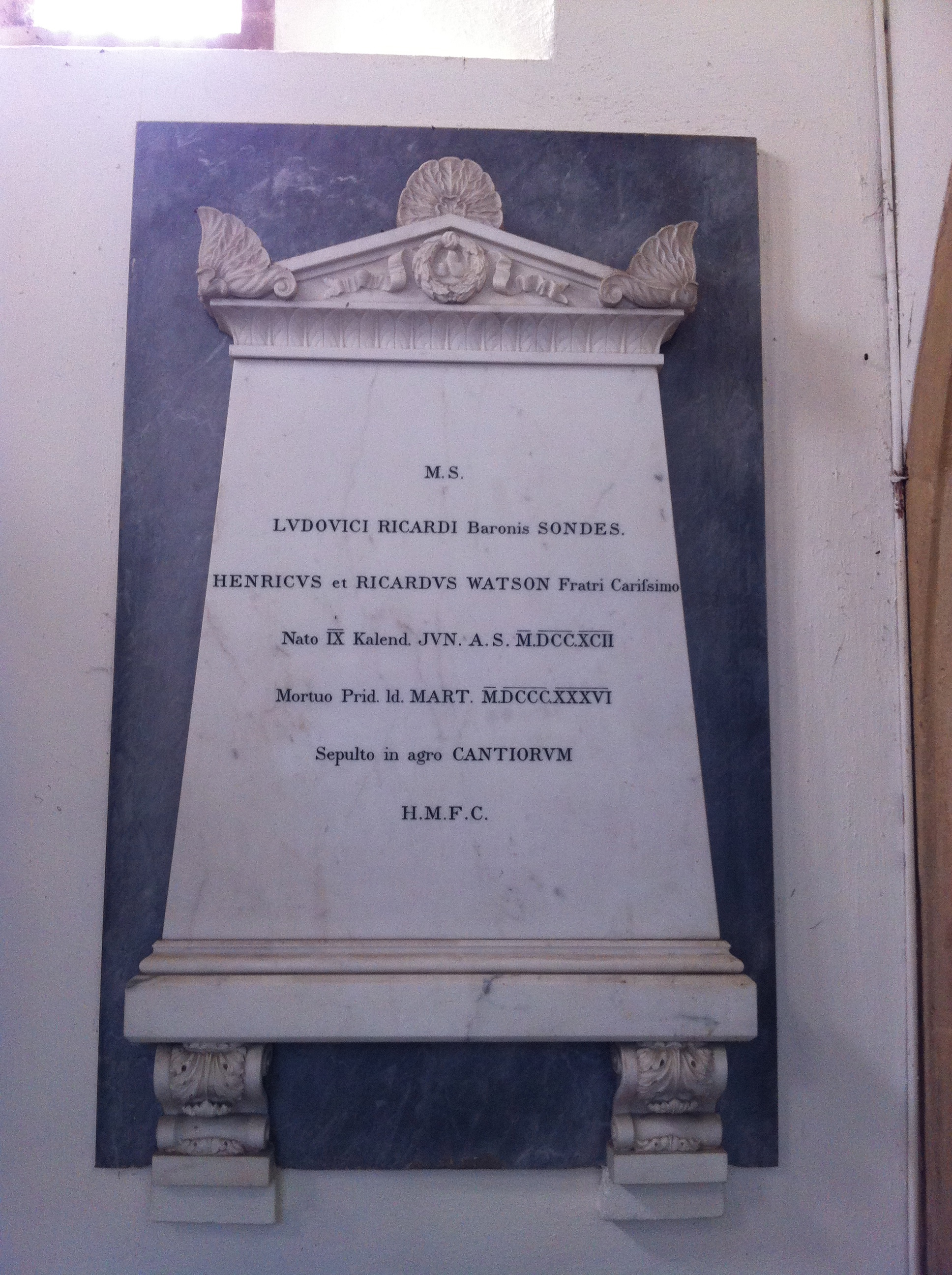
Memorial to Lewis Richard Watson, 3rd Baron Sondes, in St. Leonard's Church, Rockingham

Lewis Richard Watson, 3rd Baron Sondes (24 May 1792 – 14 March 1836), styled Hon. Lewis Watson until 1806, was an English peer. His legal struggle with his former tutor over the occupation of the rectory of Kettering led to the case of Fletcher v. Lord Sondes, in which the House of Lords declared that bonds of special resignation were simoniacal. After extensive litigation, he succeeded in instituting his younger brother in the rectory.

The eldest son of Lewis Watson, 2nd Baron Sondes, and his wife Mary, he succeeded his father in the peerage in 1806. On 1 February 1810, he matriculated at Christ Church, Oxford.

In 1814, Sondes presented his tutor, William Brice Fletcher, to the rectory of Kettering, of which he held the advowson. Fletcher entered into a bond with Sondes that he should resign the rectory when either of Sondes' younger brothers became capable of accepting a benefice. Sondes requested Fletcher's resignation in 1820 for the purpose of presenting his younger brother Henry; Fletcher, who had expected Sondes to find another benefice for him, refused, and Sondes successfully sued him for non-compliance. Fletcher appealed the verdict up to the House of Lords; in 1827, on judicial advice, they reversed the verdict and declared the bond to be simoniacal. Bonds of general resignation, where the appointee to a benefice bonded himself to resign whenever called upon by a patron to do so, had been held to be simoniacal in the case of Bishop of London v. Ffytche. However, bonds of special resignation, like that signed by Fletcher, were thought to have been legal and were frequently used until Fletcher v. Lord Sondes was decided. Parliament subsequently passed legislation indemnifying existing bondholders and legalizing bonds of special resignation under certain regulated terms. As the presentation of Fletcher had been adjudged simoniacal, it was held to be void and the right to make the next presentation fell to the Crown; the King presented Henry Watson to the rectory.

On 20 December 1830, Sondes was commissioned first major in the East Kent Regiment of Yeomanry Cavalry. He was present to give homage in person at the coronation of William IV in 1831. He died unmarried in 1836 and was succeeded by his brother George. An obituarist recalled his dislike of sentiment and cant, and his aversion to women, employing manservants instead of housemaids at Rockingham Castle.

Peerage of Great Britain
Preceded by Lewis Watson	Baron Sondes; 1806–1836	Succeeded by George Milles
