= Stavroula Mili =

Greek molecular biologist

- Σταυρούλα Μίλη
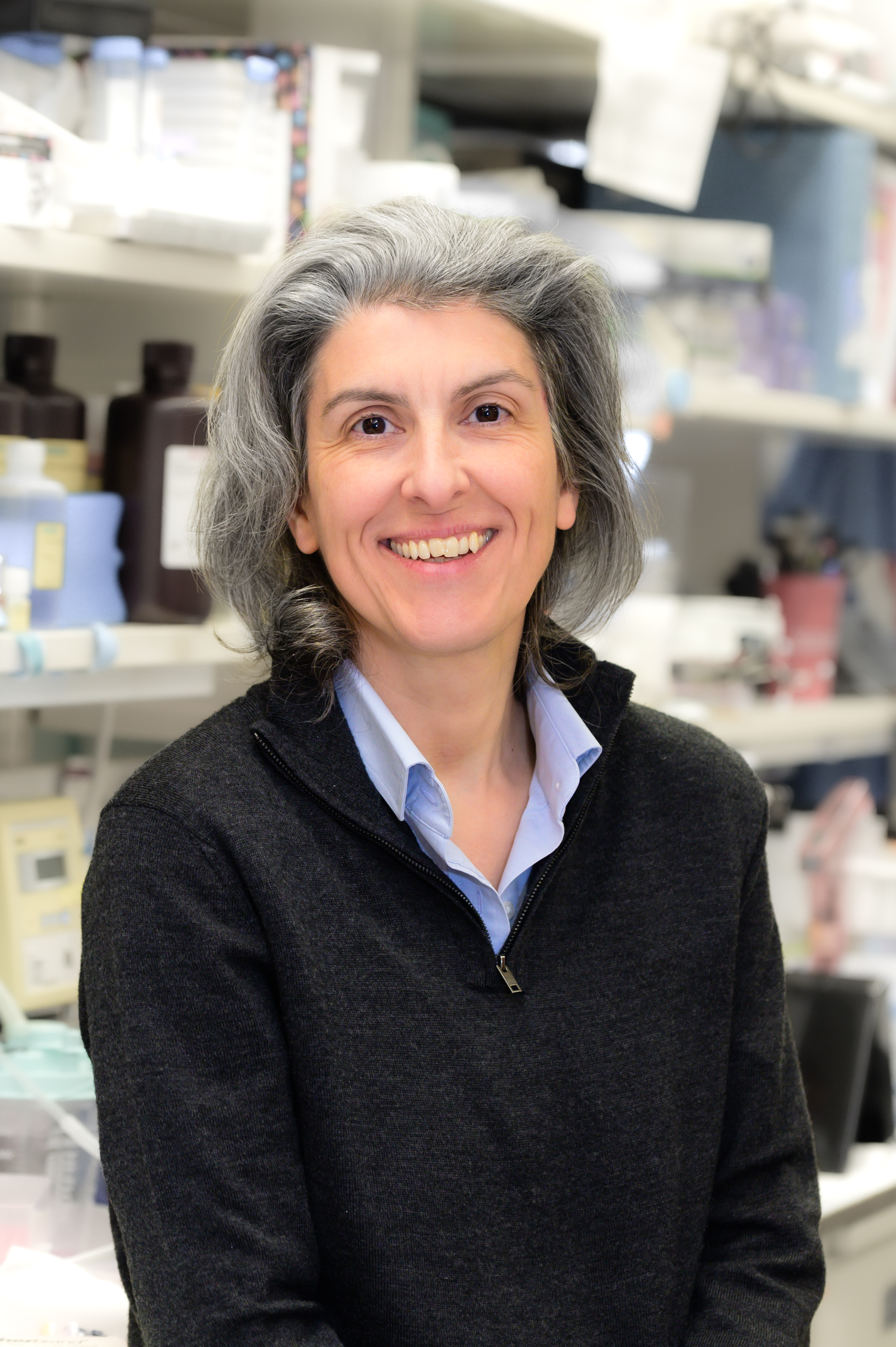
- Education: National and Kapodistrian University of Athens (BS); Icahn School of Medicine at Mount Sinai (PhD)
- Scientific career
- Fields: Molecular biology, cancer research
- Workplaces: National Cancer Institute
- Doctoral advisor: Serafin Piñol-Roma

Stavroula "Voula" Mili is a Greek molecular biologist researching the regulation, functional consequences, and disease associations of localized RNAs. She is a NIH Stadtman Investigator at the National Cancer Institute.

== Education ==
Mili obtained her B.S. in Biology from the National and Kapodistrian University of Athens and a Ph.D. degree in Biomedical Sciences from the Icahn School of Medicine at Mount Sinai under Serafin Piñol-Roma. Her 2003 dissertation was titled, Ribonucleoprotein Complexes In Gene Expression : Remodeling Events And Common Components In Nuclear And Mitochondrial Mrna Maturation. As a postdoctoral researcher she joined Joan A. Steitz's laboratory at Yale University and subsequently Ian Macara's laboratory at the University of Virginia.

== Career and research ==
Mili joined the laboratory of cellular and molecular biology as a NIH Stadtman Investigator at the National Cancer Institute (NCI) in September 2012. She discovered a localization pathway that targets RNAs at cellular protrusions. The goal of Mili's laboratory is to understand the regulation, functional consequences, and disease associations of localized RNAs.
