= Priestfield Stadium =

Association football stadium in Kent, England

Priestfield
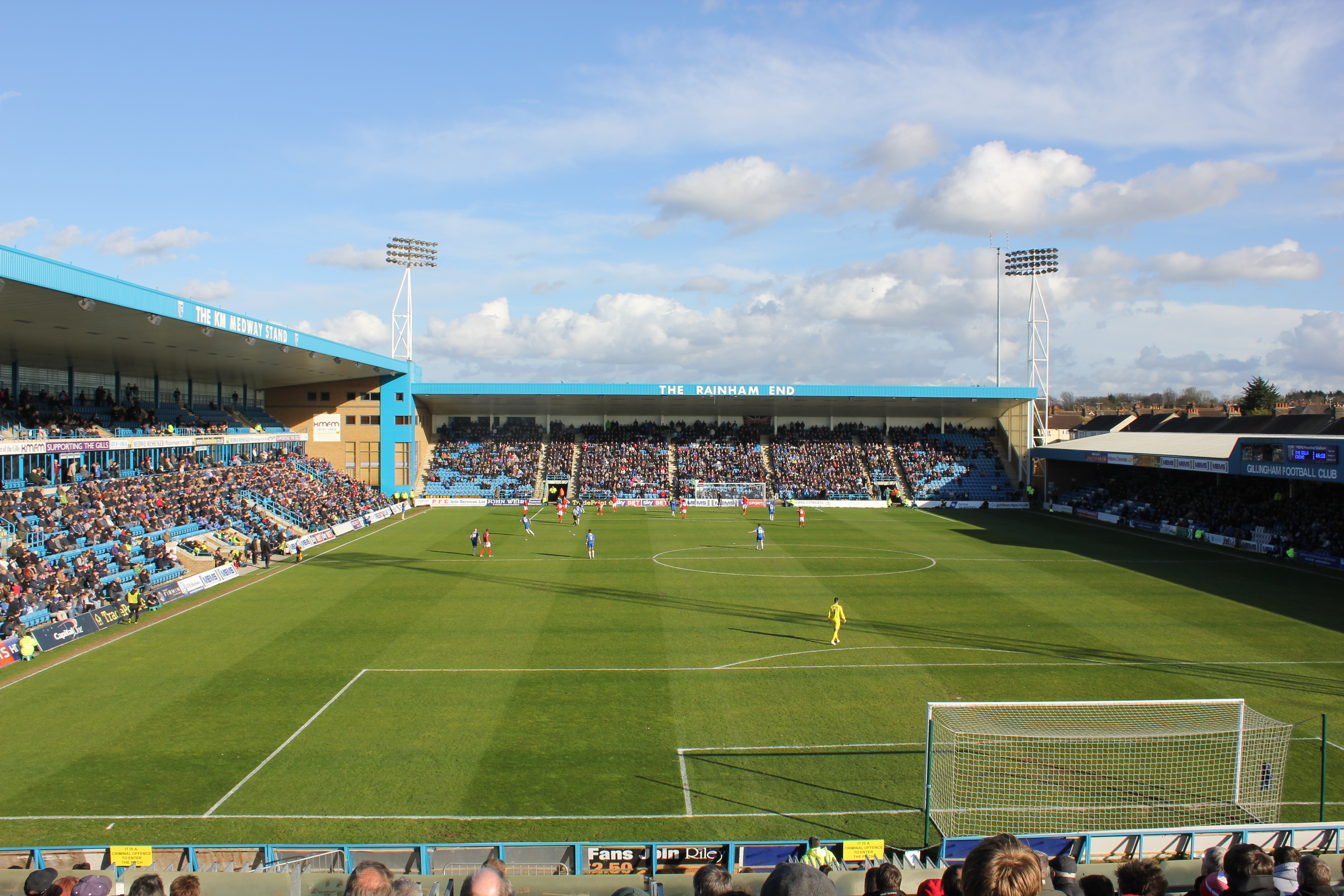
- Interior view
- Interactive map of Priestfield
- Full name: MEMS Priestfield Stadium
- Location: Gillingham, Kent, England
- Coordinates: 51°23′03″N 0°33′39″E
- Owner: Gillingham F.C. (1893–present, known as New Brompton F.C. until 1912)
- Operator: Gillingham F.C.
- Capacity: 11,582
- Surface: Grass
- Field size: 114 yd × 75 yd (104.2 m × 68.6 m)

Construction
- Built: 1893
- Opened: 1893

Tenants
- Gillingham F.C. (1893–present); Brighton & Hove Albion F.C. (1997–1999)

Priestfield Stadium (popularly known simply as Priestfield and officially known from 2007 to 2010 as KRBS Priestfield Stadium and from 2011 to 2023 and again from 2024 as MEMS Priestfield Stadium for sponsorship purposes) is a football stadium in Gillingham, Kent, England. It has been the home of Gillingham Football Club since the club's formation in 1893, and was also the temporary home of Brighton & Hove Albion Football Club for two seasons during the 1990s. The stadium has also hosted women's and youth international football matches and a London Broncos rugby league match.

The stadium underwent extensive redevelopment during the late 1990s, which has brought its capacity down from nearly 20,000 to a current figure of 11,582. It has four all-seater stands, all constructed since 1997, although one is only of a temporary nature. There are also conference and banqueting facilities and a nightspot named The Factory. Despite having invested heavily in its current stadium, Gillingham F.C. has plans to relocate to a new stadium.

== History ==
New Brompton Football Club, the forerunner of Gillingham Football Club, formed in June 1893. At the same time an area of land in Gillingham was acquired by the club's founders, the purchase being funded through an issue of 1,500 £1 shares. The stadium was initially referred to simply as the Athletic Ground and subsequently named Priestfield Road until 1947, after one of roads leading to it. A pitch was laid and a pavilion erected, and the first matches at Priestfield were staged on 2 September 1893. New Brompton's reserve team played Grays, followed immediately by the first match for the club's first team, against Woolwich Arsenal's reserves. The admission charge for the two matches was 3d. A newspaper report on the matches noted that the club had recently purchased an additional acre and three-quarters of ground and had accepted a contract for the construction of a stand containing 500 seats. Most spectators stood on terracing, banked earth, or simply along the perimeter of the pitch, as was the case at most football grounds at the time. In order to raise funds to assist with the running of the football club, New Brompton allowed the ground to be used for other events, such as smoking concerts, fêtes, athletics meetings and a ladies' football match. Sheep were allowed to graze on the pitch during the week, a common practice at many grounds at that time. In 1899, a second stand was added along part of the Gordon Road side of the ground, reportedly built by off-duty dock workers in exchange for beer and cigarettes.

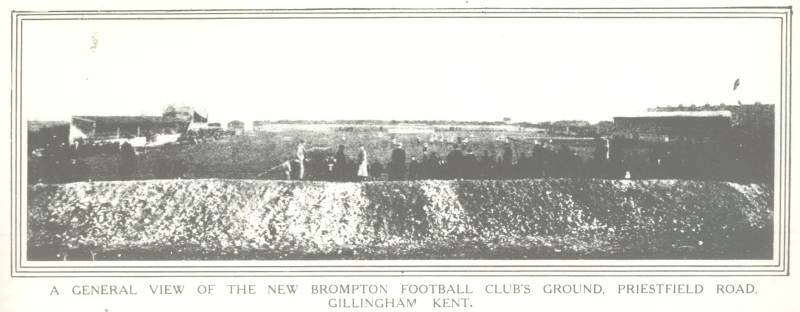
A view of the ground in 1906, taken from the Rainham end of the ground

By 1908, the total number of seats had been increased to 800 and terracing added at the Rainham end of the ground. In 1912, the club's first Supporters' Association was formed, its initial project being to raise the necessary funds to construct terracing at the opposite end of the ground. Two years later the club, which had changed its name to Gillingham F.C. in 1912, secured a bank loan of £1,570 which was used to build a new grandstand, but just a month after it was completed the stand was severely damaged by high winds, which ripped off the roof and twisted most of the ironwork. The club sued the contractors, but it took a further three months for the damage to be repaired.

A new attendance record was set in 1924 when an FA Cup match against First Division leaders Cardiff City drew a crowd of 19,472. This record stood until 1948, when 23,002 fans watched Gillingham take on Queens Park Rangers in the FA Cup, with many more turned away. In the same year the club, which had lost its place in the Football League ten years earlier after failing to gain re-election, produced a glossy brochure as part of its bid to be elected back into the league. The facilities at Priestfield were highlighted as one of the club's strengths in the brochure, which listed the ground's capacity as "between 25,000 and 30,000" but stated that plans had been drawn up to increase the capacity to 50,000, with 5,000 seats.

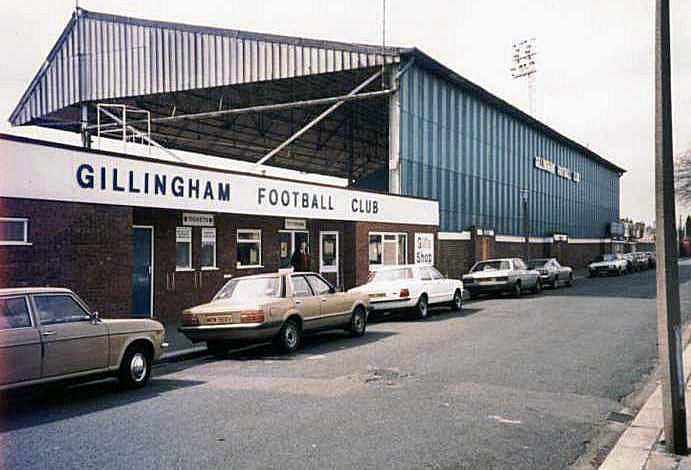
The exterior of the Main Stand in the mid-1980s

The ground underwent its most extensive redevelopment to date in 1955, at a total cost of £28,500. The previously sloping pitch was levelled, the terracing that occupied part of the Gordon Road side of the ground replaced, and new covered accommodation, known as the Stanley Stand, erected between the Rainham End and Gordon Road Stand. The first floodlights were erected in 1963, at a cost of over £14,000, but this was to be the last significant development work at Priestfield for over thirty years. By the early 1980s the capacity of the ground was listed as 22,000, although this was reduced to 19,000 when the Gordon Road Stand was closed for safety reasons. In 1987, a clock was erected at the corner of the Rainham End and the Stanley Stand, dubbed the Lord Sondes Clock in honour of Henry Milles-Lade, 5th Earl Sondes, a member of the club's board of directors. The clock was removed during later stadium redevelopment work.

New owner Paul Scally took over at the club in 1995 and soon instigated a programme of redevelopment which completely transformed the formerly run-down ground. A new Gordon Road Stand was built in 1997 at a cost of more than £2 million. A vote of supporters initially proposed that the new stand be named "The Paul Scally Stand", but this was rejected by its namesake as he felt "uncomfortable and embarrassed" by the idea. Two years later the Rainham End terracing was replaced with a new all-seater stand, with the sports centre behind it demolished and replaced with a car park.

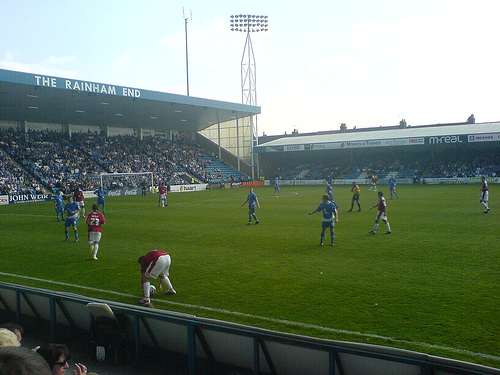
The Rainham End and Gordon Road Stand during a match in 2007

The main stand on the northern side of the pitch was demolished in 1999, along with a section of away terracing, to be replaced with a new state-of-the-art facility dubbed the Medway Stand, but the work was beset by problems. Due to serious delays with the building of the new stand, the club was forced to spend most of the subsequent season first with that side of the ground completely empty, then later with building work ongoing. Supporters were not able to sit in the new stand until the latter stages of the 1999–2000 season, and even then many of the facilities had not been finished. The stand also caused severe financial problems for the club, as its facilities eventually cost significantly more than the original estimate. The stand was named following a vote by Gillingham supporters.

The fourth side of the ground was redeveloped in 2003 when the Town End terracing was removed and a temporary stand put in its place, named after the late football commentator and Gillingham supporter Brian Moore. It was hoped that work would begin on a permanent Brian Moore Stand in 2004, but due to talk of relocating the club to a new ground and the club's current financial problems, this has been put on hold.

On 1 June 2007, the stadium was officially renamed KRBS Priestfield Stadium as part of a sponsorship deal that lasted three years with the Kent Reliance Building Society. In 2011 another such deal led to the rebranding of the stadium as MEMS Priestfield Stadium.

== Structure and facilities ==
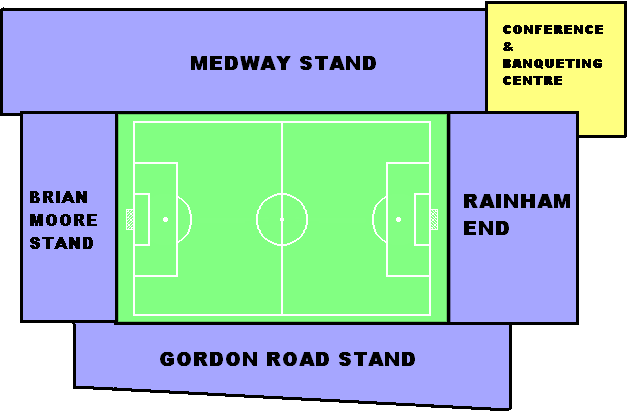
A plan of the stadium's layout

The pitch is surrounded by four all-seater stands – the Medway Stand, the Rainham End, the Gordon Road Stand and the Brian Moore Stand. All are covered with the exception of the Brian Moore Stand. The Medway Stand, which replaced the old Main Stand and part of the terracing at each end, is the largest and northernmost of the four. It has two tiers with a row of twenty executive boxes between the top and bottom tier. The stand also contains the changing rooms, physiotherapy facilities, club offices and club shop. The Rainham End, located behind the goal at the eastern end of the pitch, opened in 1999 and houses 2,400 fans. This stand, like the terrace it replaced, is known for housing the club's most vocal supporters. The Gordon Road Stand, which seats 2,600, was opened in 1997 and is opposite the Medway Stand. Due to planning requirements, the stand had a height restriction placed upon it, making it significantly lower than the other three sides of the ground, and due to the road layout behind it is narrower at one end than the other. A gantry for television cameras is located on the roof of this stand.

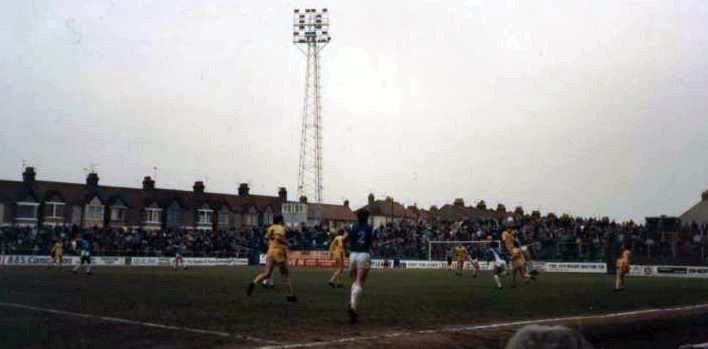
The slope of the old Gillingham End is apparent in this photo from the mid-1980s.

Opposite the Rainham End is the Brian Moore Stand. This stand is a temporary one, and accommodates visiting supporters. It occupies the site of the former Town End terracing, which was unusual in that it had a pronounced slope, with one end of the terracing being higher up than the other. In 1955 the pitch, which previously sloped at that end of the stadium, was levelled out but the gradient of the Town End was left unchanged.

The state of the stadium's pitch caused the club severe problems in 2003. A number of fixtures had to be postponed due to the state of the pitch, which was described as resembling a ploughed field, and the surface had to be heavily sanded before an FA Cup match against Leeds United. At the end of the season, taking advantage of the demolition of the old Town End, which allowed better access to the pitch, the club had the drainage system replaced and a completely new pitch laid.

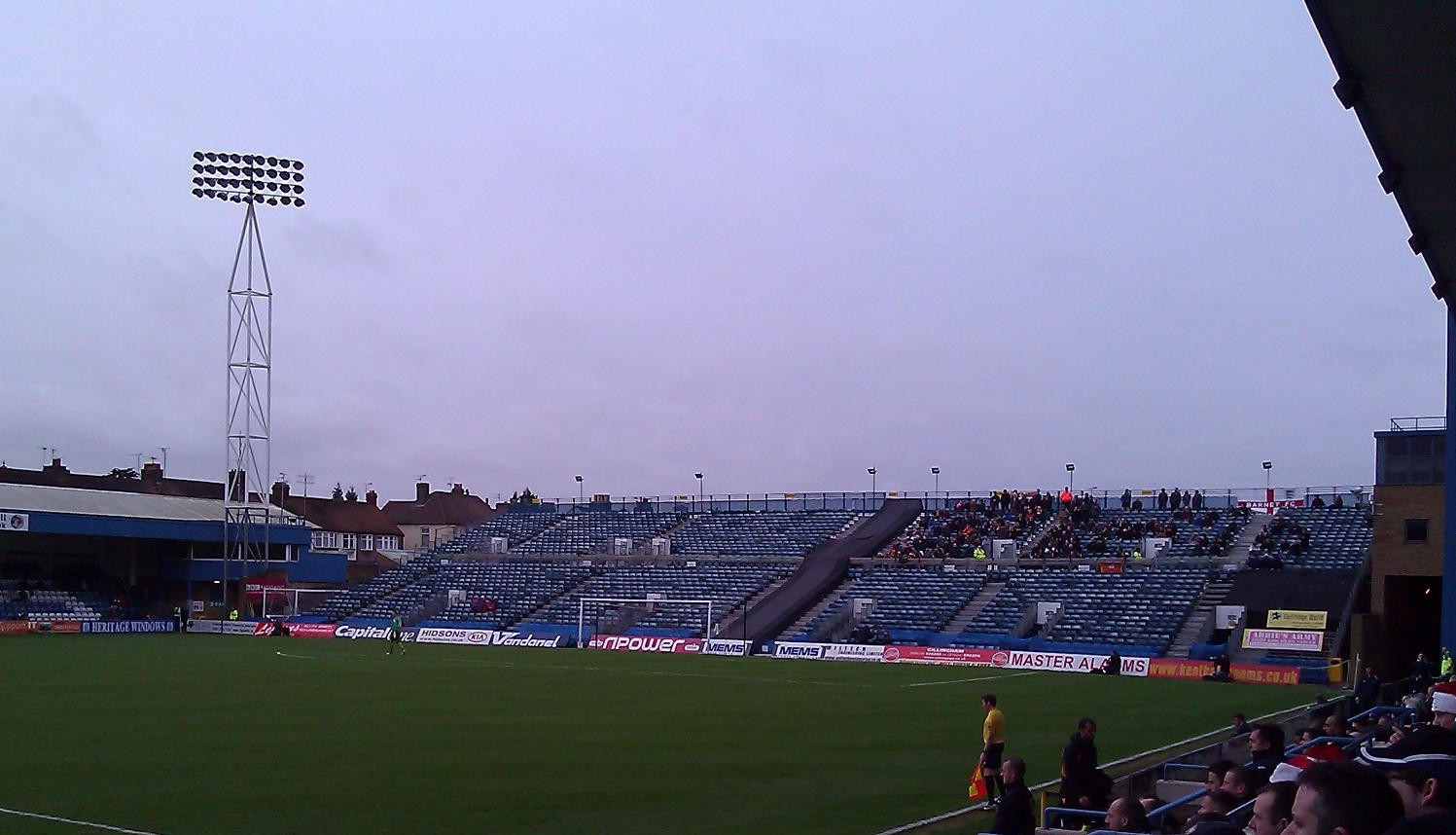
The current Brian Moore Stand, at the Gillingham end of the stadium, has been constructed on a temporary basis only.

Added to the new stands were several new developments. The Conference and Banqueting Centre, which is located behind the Rainham End, comprises the Great Hall, which can accommodate up to 600 delegates for events, and twenty smaller delegate rooms. The centre is connected to the Medway Stand, thus allowing views from the banqueting suite onto the pitch, and is also licensed for wedding ceremonies. The Blues Rock Café nightspot, located within the Medway Stand, is open between four and five nights a week and stages live music and screenings of major sporting events. The club purchased many of the fixtures and fittings for these new developments at discounted prices when the furnishings of the Millennium Dome were sold off upon its closure.

== Future ==
Former Gillingham chairman Paul Scally made it clear that he intended to relocate the club away from its current stadium, announcing in September 2003 that "there is no future for the club at the Priestfield". In 2004, the club outlined plans for a new stadium at Cuxton but abandoned them soon afterwards due to the cost of improving transport links to the site. At the time Scally stated that he anticipated the club moving within four years, but by 2007 the proposed date had been pushed back to 2010. In March 2017, he again identified Mill Hill, on the east of the A289 Yokosuka Way, as his preferred site for a new stadium, re-iterated that this was necessary for the club to have ambitions of future Premier League football, and that he would be launching a bond scheme to fund the early stages of the development.

Despite the proposed move, the club promoted its facilities, in conjunction with Medway Council, as a possible training base for athletes competing in the 2012 Summer Olympics, saying:

The Medway Stand is fully equipped with physio rooms, a hydrotherapy pool, a sauna and steam rooms to assist with the athletes' training, and a lounge bar, a cinema and a snooker room for them to enjoy during their free time. The club's offices, media centre and press room could also provide the coaches with a good administrative base. We are excited about the prospect of international athletes benefiting from our excellent facilities in preparation for London 2012.

In December 2007, Gillingham shareholders passed a resolution to sell the ground to Priestfield Developments Ltd, a company wholly owned by Paul Scally, for £9.8m as part of a restructuring of the club's debts. The deal was to allow three years use of the stadium at £1 p.a., with the club meeting running costs, with tenure secured for a further seven years at a rent as yet unspecified. In 2011, however, the club purchased the stadium back for around 10% of the fee paid by Priestfield Developments.

== Other uses ==
The stadium has occasionally been the "home" of clubs other than Gillingham. In 1895, Woolwich Arsenal played a Second Division home game against Burton Swifts at Priestfield after their own Manor Ground had been closed by the Football League for five weeks after crowd trouble at a match there earlier that year. Over a century later, during the 1997–98 and 1998–99 seasons Brighton & Hove Albion played their home matches at Priestfield, as they had entered a ground-share agreement with Gillingham as a result of the sale of their Goldstone Ground to property developers. The move, undertaken by the club after a plan to groundshare with Portsmouth fell through, was a controversial one for Brighton's fans, who faced a 150 mi (240 km) round trip to each home game. The two clubs subsequently became embroiled in a dispute over the charges levied by Gillingham for the hire of the ground, which was eventually settled out of court in 2001. In May 2012 the London Broncos hosted a rugby league match at the stadium, the first Super League match to be staged in Kent, and the club later announced the possibility of making Priestfield their permanent home venue with effect from 2013, although this did not occur.

In April 2006, the ground hosted the England women's team's World Cup Qualifier against Austria, achieving a gate of 8,068 (a higher attendance than Gillingham's average home gate for the 2005–06 season). Priestfield has also been the venue for home matches for the England youth team, including a November 2007 match against their counterparts from Ghana.

A greyhound racing track was opened around the outside of the pitch in December 1927. The racing was independent of the National Greyhound Racing Club and as such was known as a flapping track.

== Records ==
The highest attendance recorded at Priestfield was 23,002 for a match against Queens Park Rangers in the FA Cup 3rd round on 10 January 1948. The highest Football League attendance was 20,128 against Millwall in the Third Division South on 2 September 1950. The record modern (all-seated) attendance is 11,418, set on 20 September 2003 against West Ham United in the First Division.

The highest seasonal average attendance for league matches at Priestfield since Gillingham returned to the Football League in 1950 was 12,576 in the 1951–52 season. Gillingham's lowest seasonal average was 2,979 in the 1994–95 season, although Brighton recorded a lower figure of 2,328 in the 1997–98 season.

== Transport ==
The stadium is approximately 0.5 mi (1 km) from Gillingham railway station, which lies on Southeastern's Chatham Main Line from London Victoria to Dover Priory and Ramsgate. The station is also the southern terminus of the North Kent Line, which connects to London Charing Cross.
