= George Sondes, 1st Earl of Feversham =

English politician (1599–1677)

George Sondes, 1st Earl of Feversham KB (November 1599 – 16 April 1677) was an English politician who sat in the House of Commons at various times between 1626 and 1676 and was then created a peer and member of the House of Lords.

== Life ==
Sondes was born at Lees Court, in the parish of Sheldwich, near Faversham in Kent, the son of Sir Richard Sondes (1571–1645) of Throwley and his wife Susan Montagu, daughter of Sir Edward Montagu of Boughton House. He was educated at Queens' College, Cambridge, where he entered in 1615, and where his tutor was John Preston; but he does not appear to have proceeded to a degree. He entered the Middle Temple in 1619.

Sondes was created a Knight of the Bath at the coronation of Charles I on 2 February 1626. In 1626 he was elected Member of Parliament for Higham Ferrers. He was re-elected MP for Higham Ferrers in 1628 and sat until 1629 when King Charles decided to rule without parliament for eleven years. He was High Sheriff of Kent for 1636-37, and Colonel of the St Augustine Lathe Trained Band at the time of the First Bishops' War in 1639.

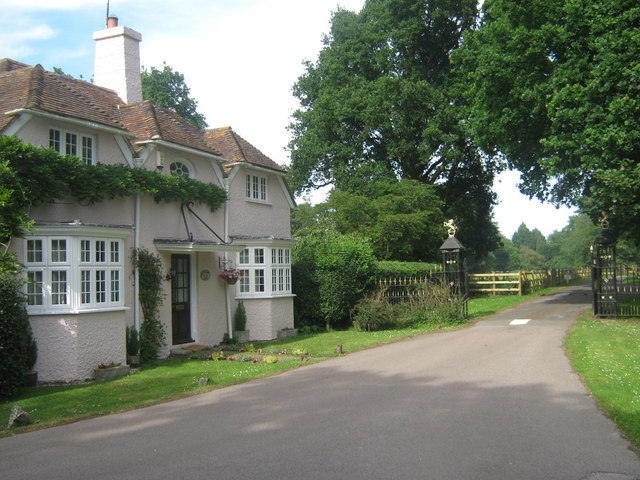
Lees Court Lodge

On the outbreak of the First English Civil War, he was named a deputy lieutenant for Kent, and was on the royalist committee for the county in 1643. As a result, he suffered greatly in his estate, and was imprisoned from 1645, first in Upnor Castle and then in the Tower of London. He was released from the Tower in May 1650, but not finally discharged until 25 June following, after compounding for his estate by a payment of £3,350. On his release, he began rebuilding Lees Court from the plans of Inigo Jones.

Whilst both were youths, one of Sondes' sons killed the other in 1655. Freeman, the youngest murdered his elder brother George whilst he was asleep in his bed. Freeman was taken to Maidstone to be tried before the Assizes. He was convicted and executed for the crime at Pennendenheath a fortnight after the crime. The body was then laid to rest in the church of Bearsted.

Sondes was blamed for moral remissness. He had failed (it was said) to continue the endowment of Throwley free school as purposed by his father, had improperly executed the will of his father-in-law, Sir Ralph Freeman, and had generally mismanaged his sons' education. Sir George answered the charges in a 'Plaine Narrative to the World, of all Passages upon the Death of his Two Sonnes' (London, 1655).

At the English Restoration in 1660, Sondes was again made deputy lieutenant of Kent. In 1661, he was elected MP for Ashburton in the Cavalier Parliament. He sat for that constituency until 1676, when he was created Earl of Feversham, Viscount Sondes, and Baron of Throwley.

Feversham died at Lees Court, without male issue, at the age of about 77. Thomas Southouse dedicated his Monasticon Favershamiense to Sondes in 1671.

== Family ==
Feversham was twice married: first, in 1620, at St. Michael, Cornhill, London to Jane Freeman, daughter and heiress of Ralph Freeman of Aspenden, Hertfordshire, Lord Mayor of London in 1633–4 and his wife Joan Crouch, by whom he had three sons: Freeman, (born 1629, died 1634), George (born 1633, died 1655) and a second Freeman (born 1635, died 1655). He married, secondly, on 25 February 1656, at St Paul's, Covent Garden, Mary Villiers, daughter of Sir William Villiers, of Brooksby. By his second wife he had two daughters: Mary, baptised in Sheldwich church on 15 March 1657 and Catherine, baptised on 20 April 1658.

On 7 August 1655, the younger son, Freeman, aged nineteen, apparently actuated by jealousy, killed his elder brother George, while he was asleep in an upper room in Lees Court, by a blow on the back of the head with a cleaver. The murderer, who at once told his father of his crime, was taken to Maidstone the next day and arraigned at Maidstone assize on 9 August. He pleaded guilty, was sentenced to death, and was hanged at Penenden Heath, near Maidstone on 21 August. The fratricide proved a theme for the pulpit: Robert Boreman at once issued 'A Mirrour of Mercy and Judgment, or an exact true narrative of the Life and Death of Freeman Sonds, Esq.,' 1655. There followed from other pens 'The Devils Reign upon Earth, being a Relation of several sad and bloudy Murthers lately committed, especially that of Sir George Sonds his son upon his own brother ....' London, 1655; and 'A Funeral Elegie upon the Death of George Sonds, Esq. ... by William Annand Junior of Throwllgh, whereunto is annexed a Prayer compiled by his sorrowful Father,' 1655..

Sondes was succeeded in his titles by special remainder by his son-in-law, Louis de Duras, 2nd Earl of Feversham, who had married his daughter, Lady Mary Sondes, on 9 March 1676. His other daughter, Lady Catherine Sondes, married Lewis Watson on 17 July 1677. Watson became Baron Rockingham in 1689, and upon the death of the second Earl of Feversham, was created Baron Throwley, Viscount Sondes of Lees Court, and Earl of Rockingham (19 October 1714).

Parliament of England
Preceded by Sir Charles Montagu	Member of Parliament for Higham Ferrers; 1626–1629	Parliament suspended until 1640
Preceded by Sir William Courtenay; John Fowell	Member of Parliament for Ashburton; 1661–1676; With: John Fowell	Succeeded by William Stawell; Rawlin Mallock
Peerage of England
New creation	Earl of Feversham; 1676–1677	Succeeded by Louis de Duras
