= George Ricketts (cricketer) =

English cricketer

George William Ricketts (2 June 1864 – 16 June 1927) was an English first-class cricketer active 1887–1902 who played for Surrey, Marylebone Cricket Club (MCC) and Oxford University.

Ricketts was born in Allahabad (then within the Bengal Presidency), a son of a British official in the Bengal Civil Service. He was educated at Winchester College and Oriel College, Oxford. He was called to the bar at the Inner Temple in 1889 and was recorder of Portsmouth from 1914. He became a Bencher in 1920. He died in South Kensington.
