= Ian Macara =

British-American biologist

Ian G. Macara is a British-American biologist, currently the Louise B. McGavock Chair at Vanderbilt University. He received his PhD from the University of Sheffield in the United Kingdom and completed postdoctoral training at Harvard University before moving to the University of Virginia, where he was the Harrison Distinguished Professor of Microbiology and Director of the Advanced Microscopy Facility. He was named the chair of the Vanderbilt Department of Cell and Developmental Biology in 2012. His research focuses on the molecules that establish Cell polarity in Epithelium, both in normal cells and in cancer.
