= Thomas Craven (cricketer) =

English cricketer

Personal information
- Full name: Thomas Craven
- Born: 20 August 1831; Whitechapel, Middlesex, England
- Died: 31 March 1868 (aged 67); Folkestone, Kent, England
- Batting: Unknown
- Bowling: Unknown

Domestic team information
- Years: Team
- 1842–1843: Marylebone Cricket Club
- 1850–1851: Middlesex

Career statistics
Competition	First-class
Matches	14
Runs scored	158
Batting average	7.18
100s/50s	–/–
Top score	41
Balls bowled	602
Wickets	38
Bowling average	?
5 wickets in innings	3
10 wickets in match	1
Best bowling	6/?
Catches/stumpings	4/–
- Source: Cricinfo, 15 August 2019

Thomas Craven (15 March 1801 – 31 March 1868) was an English first-class cricketer.

Born at Whitechapel in March 1801, Craven made his debut in first-class cricket for the Gentlemen in the Gentlemen v Players fixture of 1837 at Lord's. His next first-class appearance came five years later for the Marylebone Cricket Club (MCC) against Oxford University, with Craven also playing two matches each for the Gentlemen of England and England in 1842. He played in three first-class matches in 1843, playing once each for the Gentlemen of England, the MCC and the Gentlemen. In 1844 and 1845, he made one appearance for the Gentlemen of England, before reappearing in first-class cricket four years later when he played for the Gentlemen of England against the Gentlemen of Kent at Lord's. His final two first-class appearances came in 1850 and 1851 for Middlesex against Surrey. Craven appeared in fourteen first-class matches, scoring 158 runs with a high score of 41, while with the ball he took 38 wickets, taking five wickets in an innings on three occasions and ten wickets in a match once. He died at Folkestone in March 1868.
