= Milli Jannides =

Australian-born New Zealand artist

Milli Jannides (born 1986 in Sydney) is an Australian-born New Zealand artist, living and based in London, United Kingdom.

== Education ==
Jannides was born in Sydney, Australia, but moved to New Zealand and received her Bachelor of Fine Arts in Painting conjoint with a Bachelor of Arts in English Literature in 2009 from Elam School of Fine Arts in Auckland, while spending one semester in 2007 abroad on exchange at the Glasgow School of Art. In 2010 she was a guest student at the Düsseldorf Art Academy. In 2013 she received her Master of Arts in Painting from the Royal College of Art in London.

== Career ==
In August 2013, Jannides exhibited work at the Hermes' lack of words exhibit at Artspace NZ in Auckland, together with Manon de Boer, Eleanor Cooper, William Hsu, and Rosalind Nashashibi. In her paintings she knots vision and memory together, with each work beginning with a quote or passage from literature and often connecting the physical landscape of the scene with the emotion of a character. She uses symbols like a tree, chains, an hourglass, and steps.

== Work ==
=== Exhibitions ===
- Frottage Cottage, Hopkinson Mossman, Auckland, 2017
- The Company of Volcanoes, Hopkinson Mossman, Auckland, 2016
- Necessary Distraction: A Painting Show, Auckland Art Gallery Toi o Tāmaki, Auckland, 2015
- Sound Bow (with Ruth Buchanan), Johan Berggren, Malmö, 2014
- As the light dips, Hopkinson Mossman, Auckland, 2014
- Method & Gesture, Utopian Slumps, Melbourne, 2013
- Part Two Soft Eyes, TCB, Melbourne, 2013
- Hermes' lack of words, Artspace, Auckland, 2013
- Royal College of Art graduation show, London, 2013
- Eyelash Gnawing, Hopkinson Cundy, Auckland, 2012
- David Hofer and Milli Jannides, Hopkinson Cundy, Auckland, 2011
- Sue Crockford Gallery Window, Auckland, 2011
- Milli Jannides and Sam Rountree Williams, Victor and Hester, Glasgow, 2010
- Keeping Still, A Center for Art, Auckland, 2009
- Jokes with Strangers, A Center for Art, Auckland, 2008
- Paintings, Window Onsite, Auckland, 2008
- Here Today, Glasgow School of Art, Glasgow, 2007
