= Louis de Duras, 2nd Earl of Feversham =

British army officer, diplomat and courtier (1641–1709)

The Right Honourable The Earl of Feversham
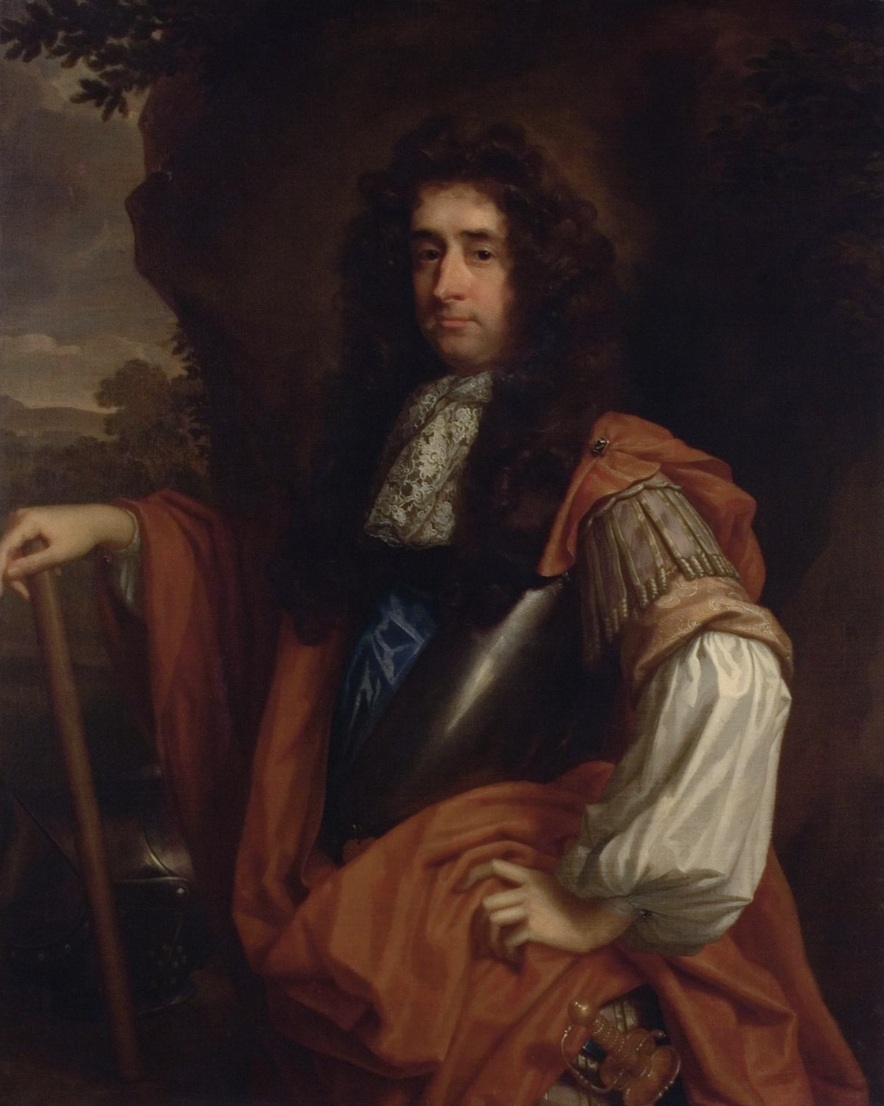
- Portrait by John Riley, c. 1685
- Born: c. 1641; France
- Died: 19 April 1709 (aged 67–68); London, England
- Spouse: Mary Sondes (m. 1676)
- Children: 7
- Military career
- Allegiance: England; Great Britain
- Branch: English Army
- Rank: Colonel
- Units: 3rd Troop of Horse Guards; 1st Troop of Horse Guards
- Conflicts: Monmouth Rebellion; Battle of Sedgemoor; 1688 Invasion of England
- Awards: Order of the Garter

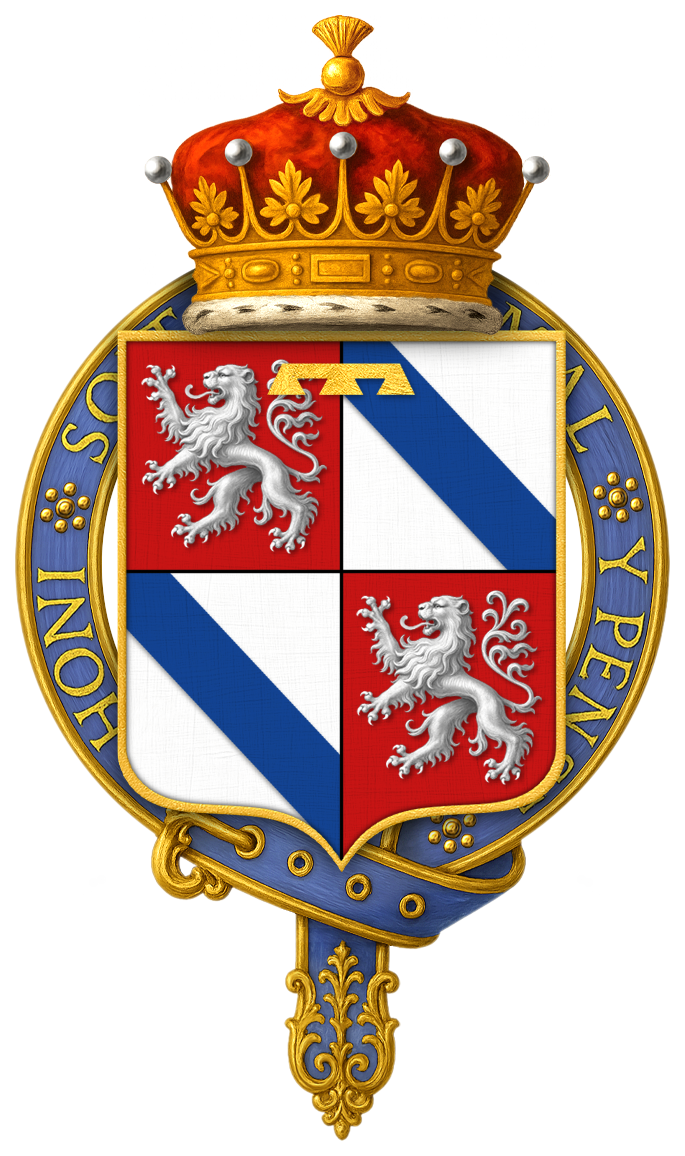
Feversham's coat of arms

Colonel Louis de Duras, 2nd Earl of Feversham, KG (c. 1641 – 19 April 1709) was a French-born English army officer, courtier and diplomat. He commanded the royal army which suppressed the Monmouth Rebellion against James II of England in 1685.

== Biography ==
Born in the Kingdom of France, he was marquis de Blanquefort and sixth son of Guy Aldonce, Marquis of Duras and Count of Rozan, from the noble Durfort family. His mother was Elizabeth de la Tour d'Auvergne, the sister of Henri de La Tour d'Auvergne, Viscount of Turenne. His two brothers Jacques Henri and Guy Aldonce were both appointed as Marshal of France. He was a Huguenot. In 1663 he came to England in the suite of James, Duke of York, and was naturalized in the same year. On 19 January 1673 he was raised to the English peerage as Baron Duras, of Holdenby, his title being derived from an estate in Northamptonshire bought from the Duke of York, and in 1676 he married Mary, daughter and elder co-heir of Sir George Sondes, created in that year Baron Throwley, Viscount Sondes and Earl of Feversham.

On the death of his father-in-law in 1677, Duras succeeded to his titles under a special remainder. His wife died in 1679. He was appointed by Charles II successively to the command of the 3rd and 1st Troop of Horse Guards, was sent abroad on several important diplomatic missions, and became Master of the Horse (1679) and Lord Chamberlain to the queen, Catherine of Braganza (1680). In 1682 he was appointed as Lord of the Bedchamber, and was present at the king's deathbed conversion to Roman Catholicism. When the Duke of York became James II of England, Feversham became a member of the Privy Council of England, and in 1685 was given the chief command against the Monmouth Rebellion under James Scott, 1st Duke of Monmouth, in which he mainly distinguished himself by his cruelty to the vanquished rebels after the Battle of Sedgemoor. He was rewarded with being made a Knight of the Garter and the colonelcy of the 1st Troop of Horse Guard, and in 1686 Feversham was appointed to the command of the army assembled by James II on Blackheath, London to overawe the people.

After James II was deposed in the Glorious Revolution, Feversham succeeded in making his peace with King William III, on the intercession of Queen Catherine, at whose instance he received the mastership of the Royal Hospital of St Katherine near the Tower (1698). According to his relation Louis de Rouvroy, duc de Saint-Simon, in her widowhood Catherine secretly married him, despite the earl being a lifelong Protestant. He died without issue on 19 April 1709 and was buried in the Savoy, in the Strand (London); but his remains were moved on 21 March 1740 to Westminster Abbey.

Military offices
Preceded by The Earl of Falmouth	Captain and Colonel of the 3rd Troop of Horse Guards; 1665–1685	Succeeded by The Lord Churchill
Preceded by The Duke of Albemarle	Captain and Colonel of His Majesty's Own Troop of Horse Guards; 1685–1689	Succeeded by The Viscount Lumley
Honorary titles
Preceded by The Lord Teynham	Lord Lieutenant of Kent; 1688–1689	Succeeded by The Earl of Winchilsea
Peerage of England
Preceded by George Sondes	Earl of Feversham; 1677–1709	Extinct
New title	Baron Duras; 1673–1709	Extinct
