= Millis (surname) =

Millis is a surname. Notable people with the surname include:

- Harry A. Millis (1873–1948), American economist
- Keith Millis (1915–1992), American metallurgical engineer
- Nancy Millis (1922–2012), Australian microbiologist
- Robert L. Millis, astronomer
- Walter Millis (1899–1968), American writer
