= Sheldwich =

Village in Kent, England

Coordinates: 51.2754°N 0.8817°E

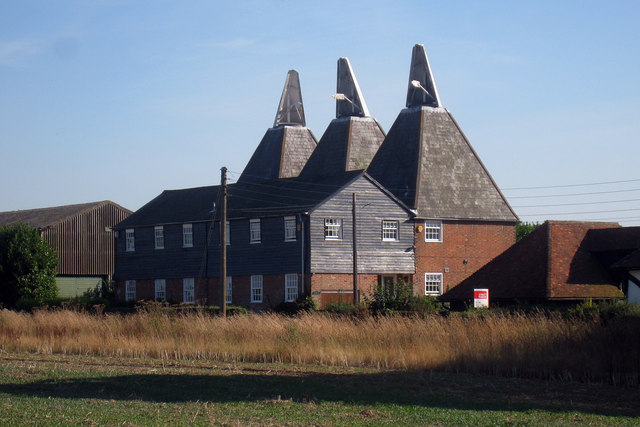
- Jesmondene Oast, Sheldwich

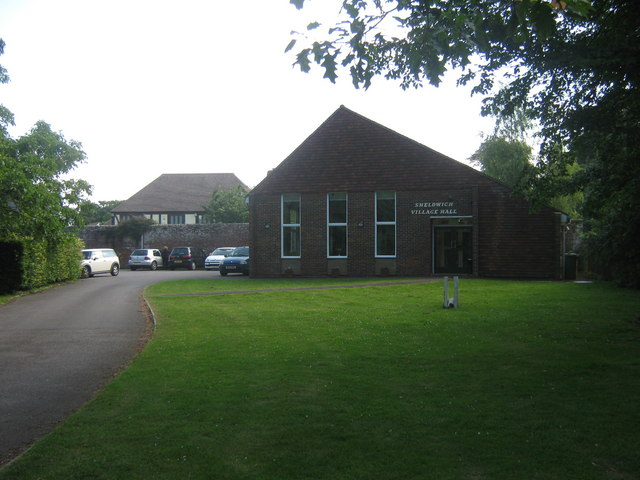
- Village hall

- Location within Kent
- Population: 485 (2021)
- OS grid reference: TR010567
- Civil parish: Sheldwich, Badlesmere & Leaveland
- District: Swale
- Shire county: Kent
- Region: South East
- Country: England
- Sovereign state: United Kingdom
- Post town: FAVERSHAM
- Postcode district: ME13 0 or 9
- Dialling code: 01795, 01227 or 01233
- Police: Kent
- Fire: Kent
- Ambulance: South East Coast
- UK Parliament: Faversham and Mid Kent

Sheldwich is a village and civil parish in the far south of the Borough of Swale in Kent, England.

== Geography ==
Sheldwich is a rural parish situated 3 miles (4.8 km) south of the market town of Faversham, 10 miles (16 km) north of Ashford and 12 miles west of Canterbury via the M2 and A2. It is fragmented into five parts, with North Street a distinct settlement on the A251, Sheldwich (including the Church and school) scattered further south on or close to the main road; Sheldwich Lees, a small village in its own right (and where the Village Hall and Village Green (known as the Lees) are situated) lying 0.5 miles (0.80 km) south-east of the junction of Lees Court Road and the Ashford Road (A251), and the hamlets of Gosmere and Copton to the north, the latter being transferred to the Parish in 2012. Other than North Street, Copton and part of Gosmere, the remainder of the parish lies within the Kent Downs, (the eastern part of the North Downs), a designated Area of Outstanding Natural Beauty. The population of the parish in the 2021 census was 485, a fall of 6 from the 2011 Census and continuing the very slow decline in the number of residents. This reflects the almost complete lack of recent residential development in the village, owing to strict planning laws. The village name of Sheldwich is unique within the United Kingdom.

== Governance ==
Sheldwich in elections every four years helps to elect one representative to Kent County Council, this is currently:

Election	Member	Ward
2025	Rich Lehmann (G)	Swale East

Sheldwich elects two representatives to Swale Borough Council, currently:

Election	Member	Ward
2023	Alastair Gould (G)	Boughton and Courtenay
2023	Tim Valentine (G)	Boughton and Courtenay

There is also the parish council with delegated responsibilities, such as for trees, litter, parks, some local leisure activities and a planning advisory role.

=== Lees Court ===
South east of the settlement of Sheldwich Lees is Lees Court, a listed Grade I country house. It was built c.1652 for George Sondes, 1st Earl of Feversham, but destroyed entirely by fire in November 1910 and painstakingly rebuilt in 1912. It was the country seat for many years of the Right Honourable the late Earl Sondes.

It is now subdivided into private apartments, along with the Grade II listed Dairy Court, Estate House, Court Yard, and Stable Yard. It also retains well maintained gardens, parkland and grounds.

The estate, once covering 85,000 acres today covers only 6,900 acres, c. 2,500 acres around the villages of Sheldwich and Badlesmere and the remainder at The Swale Estuary, Oare and Faversham Creeks.

== History ==
In ancient charters it was called 'Schyldwic'. In 784, it was given this name by Ealhmund of Kent, to Abbot Wetrede and his convent of 'Raculf Cestre', or Reculver. During King Edward I's reign (1239–1307), it passed to the family of Atte-Lese, which included the Manor of Sheldwich. This then became the Manor of Leescourt due to the name of the Atte-lese family mansion.

In 1367, Sir Richard At-Lese (MP) was an owner of the manor, he was later Sheriff of Kent. He died in 1394. In King James I's reign, Sir Richard Sondes became the owner and his son Sir George Sondes destroyed a large section of the manor house. After Sir George, Marquis of Blanquefort inherited the manor. It then stayed under his family control until 1798.

The village church, parts of which are eleventh century, is listed as Grade II*, and is dedicated to St. James. It was extended and extensively restored in 1888.

The village features its manor house, rebuilt almost entirely, lying close to woodland known as Church Plantation. There is also a Primary School, rated as outstanding at the last full assessment. The village Post Office closed in 1988.

Because of the small scattered population (485 according to the 2021 census) the civil parish is joined with those of two smaller neighbouring villages, and is known as Sheldwich, Badlesmere and Leaveland. As most of the parish lies within the Kent Downs Area of Outstanding Natural Beauty, planning laws are tight with very little new development permitted since its establishment in the mid-1960s. Property prices are mostly high as a consequence, supported by a popular and outstanding primary school.

The following are listed structures within the Parish:

- Throwley House (Grade II* )
- Church of St James (Grade II* )
- Lees Court (Grade I)
- Yew Tree Cottage
- Bier House 30 m SE of Church of St James
- The Manor House
- Dairy Court, Estate House And Courtyard, Lees Court
- Yew Tree Cottage
- Stocks Cottages
- Barn, now converted to residence. 10 m E of The Stocks
- Three Chest Tombs about 10 m S of Chancel of Church of St James
- Colbrahamsole Farmhouse and Garden Wall
- Gates about 5 m E of the Gate House (T.R. 016559)
- Chambers Cottage
- West End
- The Old School and Old School House
- Lords Cottages
- Stable Yard
- The White House
- The Old Post Office and adjoining Post Office Cottage
- The Old Bakery
- Meadow Cottage
- The Old Cottage
- Stable Block About 10 m N of Throwley House
- Little Lords
- Lees Court (Grade I listed)

== Economy ==
There are several listed oast houses, mostly now residential, such as Gosmere Oast (pictured). The area is almost wholly agricultural with a particularly fine herd of cattle at Badlesmere Court Farm and some sheep. It is also home to Sheldwich Primary School.
