= George Milles, 4th Baron Sondes =

English peer

The Right Honourable The Baron Sondes
- Born: John George Watson; 20 January 1794
- Died: 17 December 1874 (aged 80); Norfolk
- Burial place: North Elmham, Norfolk
- Military career
- Allegiance: United Kingdom
- Branch: British Army
- Service years: 1812–1816; 1826–1838
- Rank: Major
- Units: Royal Horse Guards; Norfolk Yeomanry
- Conflicts: Napoleonic Wars; Peninsular War; Battle of Toulouse; Hundred Days; Battle of Waterloo
- Awards: Military General Service Medal

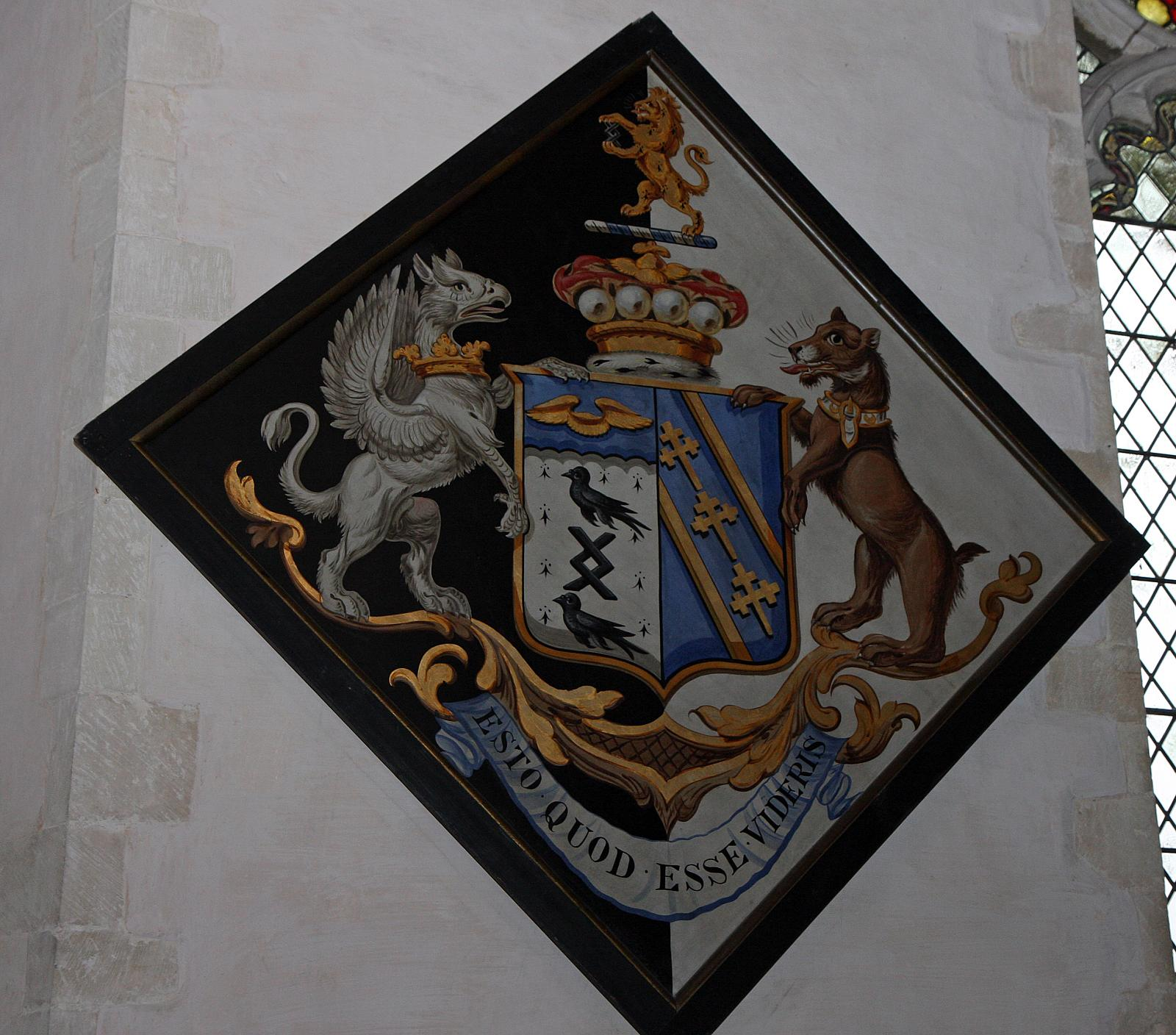
Funeral Hatchment of George Milles, 4th Baron Sondes, in St Mary's Church, North Elmham, Norfolk. Arms of Milles impaling Knatchbull

George John Milles, 4th Baron Sondes (20 January 1794 – 17 December 1874), styled Hon. George Watson until 1820 and Hon. George Milles from 1820 to 1836, was an English peer.

George was the second son of Lewis Watson, 2nd Baron Sondes, and his wife Mary Milles. On 17 October 1811, he matriculated at Christ Church, Oxford. He purchased a cornetcy in the Royal Horse Guards on 15 December 1812. He purchased a lieutenancy on 24 March 1814, and fought at the Battle of Waterloo. He retired from the army in May 1816. George changed his surname to Milles, that of his mother's family, on 27 December 1820, in accordance with the will of his grandfather Richard Milles. He inherited Milles' estate at North Elmham in Norfolk. He married Eleanor Knatchbull, 5th daughter of Sir Edward Knatchbull, 8th Baronet.

He was commissioned a captain in the 2nd Regiment of Norfolk Yeomanry Cavalry on 27 June 1826. In 1830, he served as High Sheriff of Norfolk. On 31 March 1831, he was promoted to major in the Norfolk Yeomanry.

He succeeded his brother in the peerage on 14 March 1836. On 20 September 1836, he was commissioned a captain in the East Kent Regiment of Yeomanry Cavalry, and resigned his commission in the Norfolk Yeomanry in April 1838. He was present to give homage in person at the coronation of Queen Victoria in June 1838.

Sondes was a shareholder in the Faversham Public Rooms Company, which was wound up in 1871. He died on 17 December 1874 and was succeeded by his eldest son George Milles, 1st Earl Sondes.

Honorary titles
Preceded by Andrew Fontaine	High Sheriff of Norfolk; 1830	Succeeded by John Angerstein
Peerage of Great Britain
Preceded by Lewis Watson	Baron Sondes; 1836–1874	Succeeded by George Milles
