= Henry Milles-Lade, 5th Earl Sondes =

British peer

The Right Honourable The Earl Sondes

5th Earl Sondes
- Preceded by: George Henry Milles-Lade, 4th Earl Sondes

Personal details
- Born: Henry George Herbert Milles-Lade; 1 May 1940 England
- Died: 2 December 1996 (aged 56)
- Spouse(s): 1st: Primrose Ann Cresswell (married 1968, divorced 1969); 2nd: Countess Silvia-Gabrielle zu Salm-Reifferscheidt-Raitz (married 1976, divorced 1981); 3rd: Sharon McCluskey (married 1981, divorced 1984); 4th: Phyllis Kane Schmertz, Rt Honourable Countess Sondes, (married 1986)
- Children: No issue
- Known for: Director of Gillingham Football Club, Kent landowner and socialite

Henry George Herbert Milles-Lade, 5th Earl Sondes (1 May 1940 – 2 December 1996), styled Viscount Throwley between 1941 and 1970, was a British peer. He inherited the title upon the death of his father in 1970, and the peerage became extinct when he died without an heir.

== Personal life ==
The fifth earl was considered a colourful character. As a child, he was a page at the wedding of his aunt and uncle, Nadine McDougall and Prince Andrei Alexandrovich of Russia. In his pre-teen years, he was a page at the coronation of Queen Elizabeth II but was later expelled from Eton College for operating gambling books. He owned racehorses and greyhounds, but his strongest connection with sport was with the football club, Gillingham F.C., where he served as vice-chairman of the board of directors. Upon his retirement from the role, a large clock was erected at the club's Priestfield Stadium and dubbed the "Lord Sondes Clock" in his honour. The clock was removed as part of ground redevelopment work in the 1990s, and its subsequent whereabouts are unknown.

The Earl was married four times. His wives included the New York socialite Sharon McCluskey (daughter of Ellen Lehman McCluskey of the Lehman family), whom he married in 1981 and divorced in 1984, and another American whom he married in 1986, Phyllis Kane Schmertz (widow of Robert Schmertz, owner of the Boston Celtics), who survived him and inherited Lees Court in Kent, which she transformed into an agricultural business growing pharmaceutical and biofuel crops. The Earl died from cancer, and was buried in the church in the village of Sheldwich south of Faversham in Kent.

== Lees Court estate ==
The Sondes family estate in Kent had been in family hands for over 700 years and once stretched to over 85,000 acres (34,000 ha) in the early 1900s. The estate at Earl Sondes' death was 6,900 acres (2,800 ha) including a core of 2,663 acres (1,078 ha) around the villages of Sheldwich and Badlesmere with the balance at the Swale Estuary, Oare and Faversham Creeks.

== Marriages ==
1. 1968 (divorced 1969) Primrose Ann Cresswell (former wife of Richard Hugh Nicholas Cresswell), daughter of Laurence Stopford Llewellyn Cotter (1912–1943), younger son of Sir James Laurence Cotter, 5th Baronet.
2. 1976 (divorced 1981) Countess Silvia-Gabrielle zu Salm-Reifferscheidt-Raitz (widow of Hugo, Altgraf zu Salm-Reifferscheidt-Raitz), daughter of Hans Otto Schied.
3. 1981 (divorced 1984) Sharon McCluskey, daughter of Ellen Lehman McCluskey of the Lehman Brothers banking family.
4. 1986 Phyllis Kane Schmertz. Right Honourable Countess Sondes.

== Title from birth ==
- The Honourable Henry George Herbert Milles-Lade (1 May 1940 – 17 January 1941)
- Viscount Throwley (17 January 1941 – 30 April 1970)
- The Right Honourable The Earl Sondes (30 April 1970 – 2 December 1996)

== Family titles ==
There were no heirs to his titles, and on Right Honourable Henry George Herbert, 5th Earl Sonde's death on 2 December 1996, the titles became extinct.

- Earl Sondes of Lees Court, County of Kent, created letters patent 4 May 1880 – extinct 2 December 1996
- Viscount Throwley of Throwley, County of Kent, created letters patent 4 May 1880 – extinct 2 December 1996
- Baron Sondes of Lees Court, County of Kent, created letters patent 20 May 1760 – extinct 2 December 1996

== Arms ==
Coat of arms of Henry Milles-Lade, 5th Earl Sondes

Coronet
A Coronet of an Earl
Crest
1st: A Leopard's Head affrontée erased Sable bezantée charged on the neck with two Cross Crosslets fitchée in saltire Or (Lade); 2nd: A Lion rampant Erminois holding between the paws a Fer-de-moulin Sable (Milles)
Escutcheon
Quarterly: 1st and 4th, Argent on a Fess wavy between three Escallops Sable two Cross Crosslets fitchée in saltire Or (Lade); 2nd and 3rd, Ermine a Fer-de-moulin between two Martlets in pale Sable on a Chief engrailed Azure two Marlion's Wings conjoined Or (Milles)
Supporters
Dexter: A Griffin Argent gorged with a Marquess's Coronet Or; Sinister: A Bear proper gorged with a Belt Argent thereon two Crescents Buckle and Pendant Or
Motto
Esto Quod Esse Videris (Be what you seem to be)

Peerage of the United Kingdom
Preceded by George Henry Milles	Earl Sondes; 1970–1996	Extinct
