= George Milles, 1st Earl Sondes =

British peer and Conservative politician

George Watson Milles, 1st Earl Sondes (2 October 1824 – 10 September 1894), was a British peer and Conservative politician. Sondes was the son of George Milles, 4th Baron Sondes, by his wife Eleanor Knatchbull, 5th daughter of Sir Edward Knatchbull, 8th Baronet.

== Political career ==
Sondes was elected Member of Parliament for Kent East in 1868, a seat he held until 1874 when he succeeded his father as fifth Baron Sondes and entered the House of Lords. In 1880 he was created Viscount Throwley, of the County of Kent, and Earl Sondes, of Lees Court in the County of Kent.

== Cricket ==
A keen amateur cricketer, Milles made a single appearance in first-class cricket for the Gentlemen of Kent against the Gentlemen of England at Lord's in 1849. Batting twice in the match, he was dismissed for 3 runs in the Gentlemen of Kent first innings by Thomas Craven, while in their second innings he was dismissed without scoring by the same bowler.

== Family ==
Lord Sondes married Charlotte Stracey, daughter of Sir Henry Stracey, 5th Baronet, in 1859. They had several children. Mary Georgina was born in 1859 and died in 1908. Lily Geraldine was born in 1862 and died in 1914. He died in September 1894, aged 69, and was succeeded in his titles by his eldest son, George Milles-Lade, 2nd Earl Sondes. Lady Sondes died in June 1927.

== Arms ==
Coat of arms of George Milles, 1st Earl Sondes
Coronet A Coronet of an Earl Crest 1st: A Leopard's Head affrontée erased Sable bezantée charged on the neck with two Cross Crosslets fitchée in saltire Or (Lade); 2nd: A Lion rampant Erminois holding between the paws a Fer-de-moulin Sable (Milles) Escutcheon Quarterly: 1st and 4th, Argent, on a fess wavy between three escallops sable two cross crosslets fitchée in saltire or (Lade); 2nd and 3rd, Ermine, a fer-de-moline between two martlets in pale sable on a chief engrailed azure two wings conjoined or (Milles) Supporters Dexter: A Griffin Argent gorged with a Marquess's Coronet Or; Sinister: A Bear proper gorged with a Belt Argent thereon two Crescents Buckle and Pendant Or Motto Esto Quod Esse Videris (Be what you seem to be)

Parliament of the United Kingdom
Preceded by Sir Edward Dering, Bt; Edward Leigh Pemberton	Member of Parliament for Kent East; 1868–1874; With: Edward Leigh Pemberton	Succeeded by Edward Leigh Pemberton; Sir Wyndham Knatchbull, Bt
Peerage of the United Kingdom
New creation	Earl Sondes; 1880–1894	Succeeded by George Milles-Lade
Peerage of Great Britain
Preceded by George Milles	Baron Sondes; 1874–1894	Succeeded by George Milles-Lade
