= Edward Watson, 2nd Baron Rockingham =

English landowner and peer (1630–1689)

Edward Watson
- Baron Rockingham
- Coat of arms
- Reign: Charles II; James II; William III
- Predecessor: Lewis Watson, 1st Baron Rockingham
- Successor: Lewis Watson, 1st Earl of Rockingham
- Other titles: Baronet of Rockingham Castle
- Born: 30 June 1630; Rockingham Castle
- Baptised: 13 July 1630; Rockingham
- Died: 22 June 1689 (aged 58)
- Buried: 26 June 1689; Rockingham church
- Noble family: Watson
- Spouse: Anne Wentworth
- Issue: Lewis Watson, 1st Earl of Rockingham; Edward Watson; Thomas Watson; George Watson; Eleanor Watson; Arabella Watson; Anne Watson; Margaret Watson
- Father: Lewis Watson, 1st Baron Rockingham
- Mother: Eleanor Manners
- Occupation: politician

Edward Watson, 2nd Baron Rockingham (30 June 1630 – 22 June 1689) was an English landowner and peer. He was the only surviving son of Lewis Watson, 1st Baron Rockingham (1584 – 1653) of Rockingham Castle and his second wife, Eleanor Manners (1629 – 1696), daughter of Sir George Manners, of Haddon Hall, Derbyshire and Grace Pierrepont, daughter of Sir Henry Pierrepont.

A Whig in politics, he took his seat in the House of Lords in June 1660. He was Keeper of Corby Woods, Rockingham Forest in 1660. His claims, as owner of the manor of Little Weldon, to do service as Master of the Buckhounds at the coronation of Charles II, and at that of James II, were not allowed.

He married, on 13 November 1654 at St. Giles's-in-the-Fields, Anne Wentworth (1629 – 1696), daughter of Thomas Wentworth, 1st Earl of Strafford (1593 – 1641) and Arabella Holles (d. 1631), daughter of John Holles, 1st Earl of Clare. They had four sons and four daughters:

- Lewis Watson, 1st Earl of Rockingham married Catherine Sondes (d. 1696), daughter of George Sondes, 1st Earl of Feversham.
- Edward Watson (4 February 1657 – 2 February 1676).
- Thomas Watson (17 June 1665 – 6 October 1723) married Anne Proby, daughter of Sir Thomas Proby of Elton Hall.
- George Watson (b. 26 December 1669) died unmarried.
- Eleanor Watson (b. 26 February 1659) married, 23 October 1679, Thomas Leigh, 2nd Baron Leigh (1652 – 1710) of Stoneleigh, Warwickshire.
- Arabella Watson (18 March 1661 – 1734) married Sir Thomas Oxenden.
- Anne Watson (b. 4 February 1663) died unmarried.
- Margaret Watson (22 November 1667 – 3 February 1714).
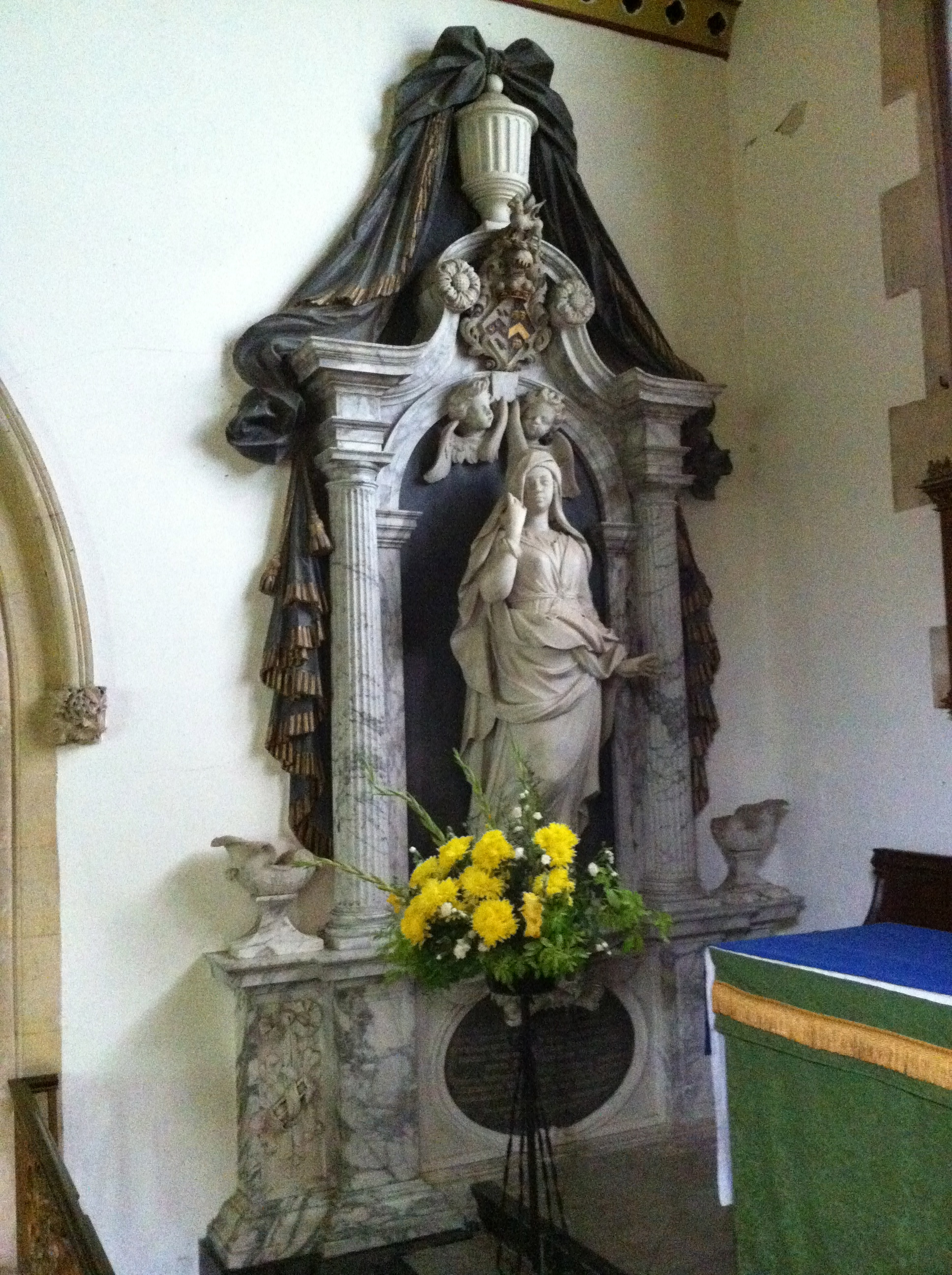
Memorial to Anne, née Wentworth, wife of Edward Watson, 2nd Baron Rockingham

Arms of Watson, of Rockingham Castle: Argent, on a chevron engrailed azure between three martlets sable as many crescents or

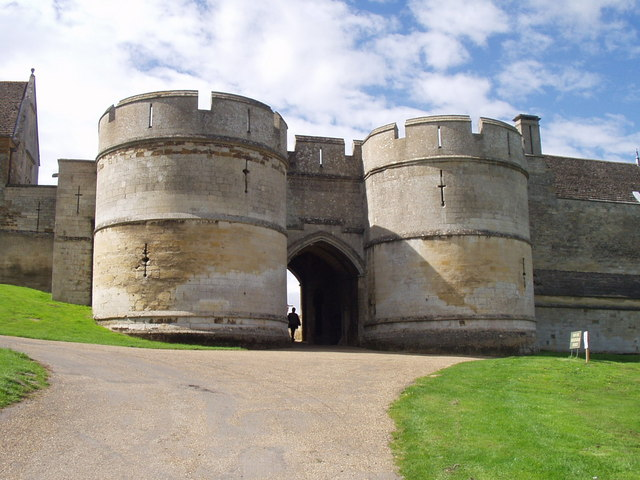
Rockingham Castle, Northamptonshire, seat of the Watson family

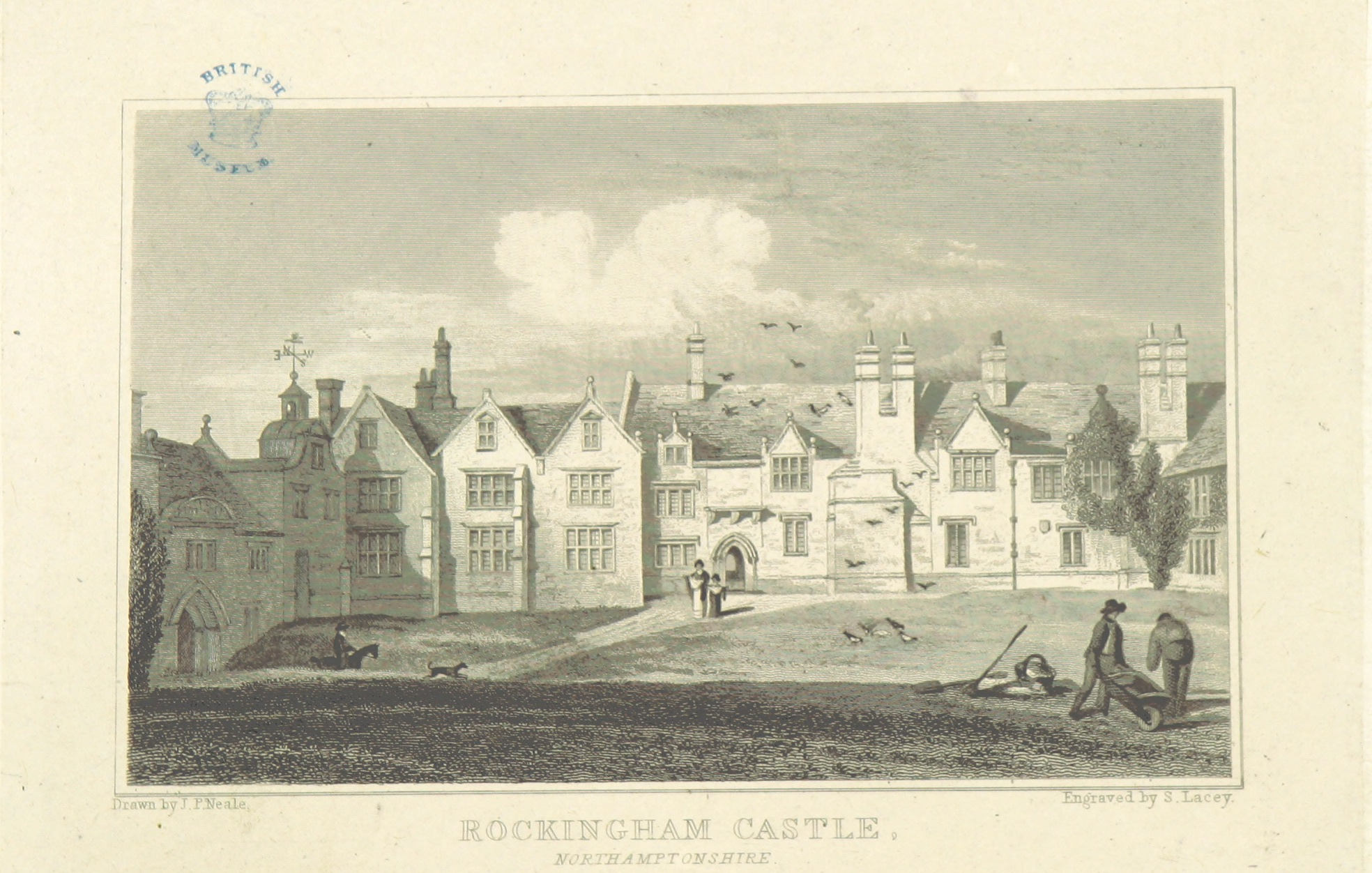
Rockingham Castle, Northamptonshire

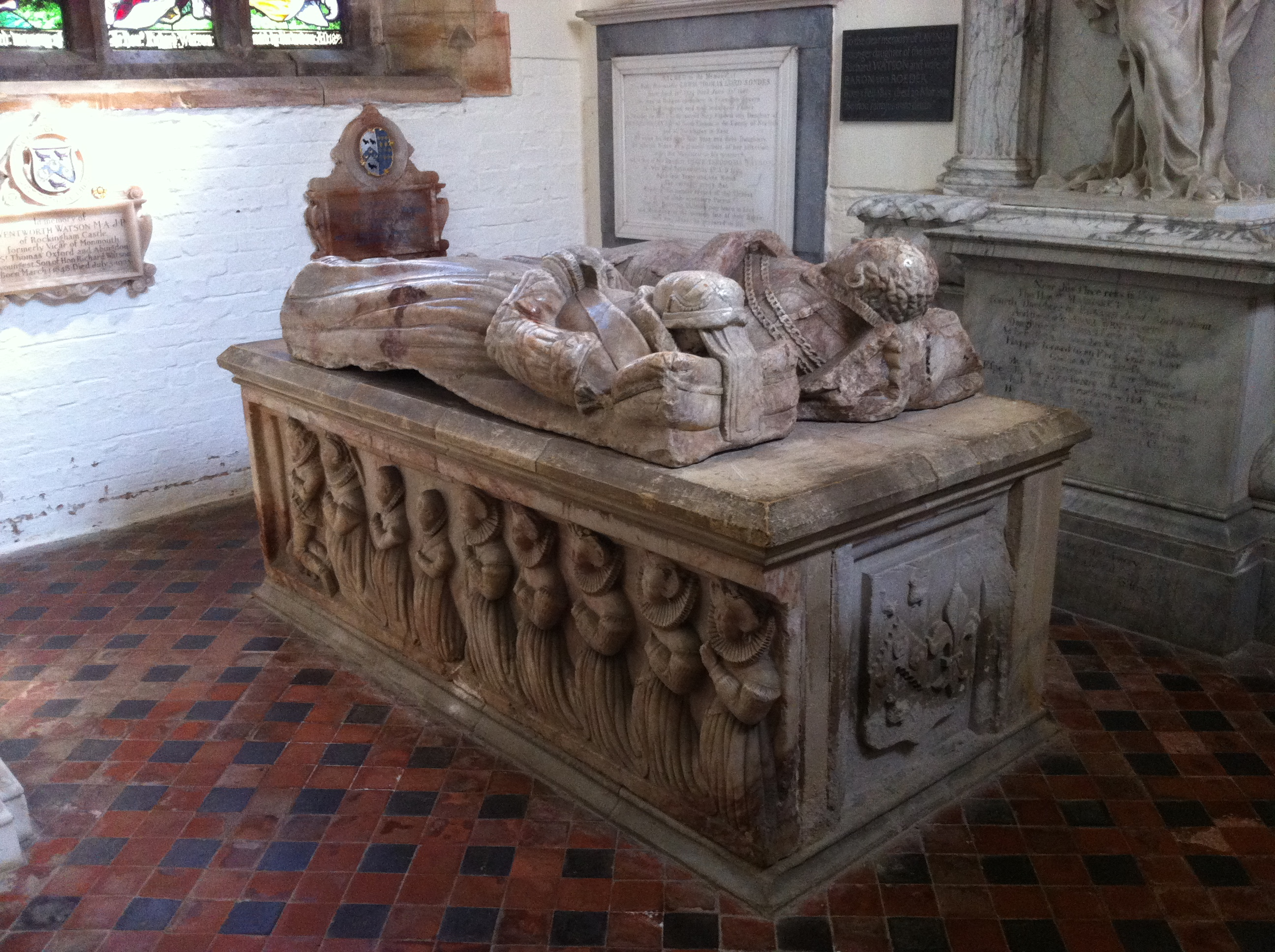
Memorial in St Leonard's Church, Rockingham, erected by Lewis Watson, 1st Baron Rockingham (1584–1653) after the Civil War

He died 22 June and was buried 26 June 1689 at Rockingham. He was succeeded in the Barony by his son, Lewis, later created Earl of Rockingham. His widow died 2 January and was buried with her husband at Rockingham 8 January 1696.

== Sources ==
- Bennett, Martyn (23 September 2004). "Watson, Lewis, first Baron Rockingham (bap. 1584, d. 1653), landowner". Oxford Dictionary of National Biography (online ed.). Oxford University Press. doi:10.1093/ref:odnb/28853. (Subscription, Wikipedia Library access or UK public library membership required.)
- Cokayne, George Edward (1949). White, Geoffrey H. (ed.). The Complete Peerage, or a History of the House of Lords and all its Members from the Earliest Times. Vol. 11. London: St Catherine Press. p. 57.
- Henning, Basil Duke (1983). "Watson, Hon. Lewis (1655-1724), of Rockingham Castle, Northants". In Henning, Basil Duke (ed.). The History of Parliament: the House of Commons 1660-1690. British History Online.
- Watson, Paula; Sgroi, Rosemary (2010). "Watson, Sir Lewis (1584-1653), of Rockingham Castle, Northants". In Thrush, Andrew; Ferris, John P. (eds.). The History of Parliament: the House of Commons 1604-1629 (Online ed.) – via History of Parliament Online.
- Wise, Charles (1891). Rockingham Castle and the Watsons. London: Elliot Stock. OCLC 902976023.
