= Edward Montagu (judge) =

English judge (1488–1557)

The Right Honourable Sir Edward Montagu
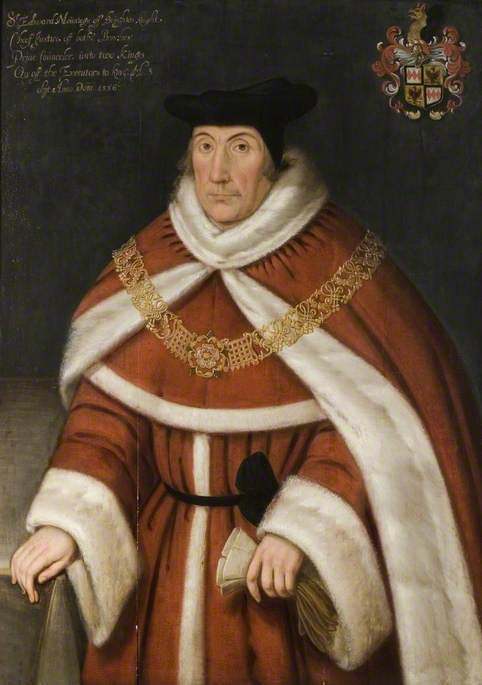
- Portrait of Sir Edward Montagu of Boughton (d. 1557)

Chief Justice of the Common Pleas
- In office 6 November 1545 – 26 July 1553
- Appointed by: Henry VIII
- Preceded by: Sir John Baldwin
- Succeeded by: Sir Richard Morgan

Chief Justice of the King's Bench
- In office 22 January 1539 – 6 November 1545
- Appointed by: Henry VIII
- Preceded by: Sir John FitzJames
- Succeeded by: Sir Henry Montagu

Personal details
- Born: c. 1488 Brigstock, Northamptonshire
- Died: 10 February 1557 (aged 68–69) Boughton
- Resting place: St Mary, Weekley
- Spouses: Cicely Lane; Agnes Kirkham; Eleanor Roper
- Children: with Cicely: Ralph; Thomas; Robert; Dorothy; Anne; Amey; with Eleanor: Edward; Roger; Simon; Thomas; William; Elizabeth; Eleanor; Isabel; Mary; Margaret; Agnes
- Parent(s): Thomas Montagu; Agnes Dudley
- Education: University of Cambridge
- Profession: Lawyer, Judge

Sir Edward Montagu (c. 1488 – 10 February 1557) of Boughton, Hanging Houghton and Hemington in Northamptonshire was an English lawyer and judge in the time of Henry VIII and Edward VI. He was Chief Justice of the King's Bench from 1539 to 1545 and Chief Justice of the Common Pleas from 1545 to 1553.

== Life ==
He was born in or before 1488 at the royal manor house at Brigstock, Northamptonshire, the 2nd son of Thomas Montagu (d. 1517) of Hemington, and Agnes Dudley, daughter of William Dudley of Clopton, and Christiana Darrell. His grandfather, Richard Ladde, assumed the name of Montagu in about 1447.

Montagu was a student at Cambridge and was admitted to Middle Temple on 22 May 1506. He served as Autumn Reader for the Inn in 1524 and 1531. He was made Serjeant-at-law in 1531, King's Serjeant in 1537 and was knighted on 18 October 1537. He was appointed Chief Justice of the King's Bench in 1539, which office he resigned in 1545 and was transferred to the "less onerous, but more profitable" post of Chief Justice of the Common Pleas. He was a member of the Privy Council of Henry VIII, who appointed him one of sixteen executors of his last will, and governor to his son Edward. During the crisis of 1553 when Edward VI wished to alter the succession in favour of Lady Jane Grey, Montagu protested at the illegality of the proceedings. However, when the Duke of Northumberland called him a traitor and threatened him with physical violence, he withdrew his protest. He was imprisoned in the Tower of London on Mary's accession but bought his way out.

In 1528, he purchased the manor of Boughton, near Kettering, Northamptonshire, and built the family seat of Boughton House on the site.

== Marriages and children ==
Montagu married three times:

- First, Cicely Lane, of Orlingbury by whom he had three sons who all died young, and three daughters:

- Ralph Montagu,
- Thomas Montagu
- Robert Montagu
- Dorothy Montagu, the eldest daughter, married, in 1535, Edward Watson (d. 1584) of Rockingham Castle, the son of Edward Watson (d. 1530) of Lyddington, Rutland and Emma Smith. After the death of his father in 1530 Watson became a ward of Thomas Cromwell, was educated and later employed by the minister. Edward and Dorothy had a son and six daughters, including:

- Sir Edward Watson (c. 1549 – 1617) married, in April 1567, Anne Digby (d. 1612), daughter of Kenelm Digby of Stoke Dry, Rutland. They had two sons and eight daughters, including:

- Lewis Watson, 1st Baron Rockingham (1584 – 1653)

- Catherine Watson married Arthur Brooke of Great Oakley.
- Mary Watson
- Elizabeth Watson married Thomas Furtho of Furtho, Northamptonshire.
- Ellen Watson married George Flower.
- Anne Watson
- Emma Watson

- Anne Montagu, married John Rowse of Rowse Lench, Worcestershire
- Amey Montagu, married George Linne of Southwick, Northamptonshire.

- Second, Agnes Kirkham, daughter George Kirkham (d. 1527) of Warmington, by whom he had no children.
- Third, Eleanor Roper (d. 1563), daughter of John Roper (d. 1524), of Well Hall, chief clerk of the king's bench and attorney-general to Henry VIII, widow of John Moreton, by whom he had eleven children (five sons and six daughters):

- Edward Montagu (1532–1602), his eldest surviving son, was father of eight sons and four daughters, including:

- Edward Montagu, 1st Baron Montagu of Boughton, ancestor of the Dukes of Montagu
- Henry Montagu, 1st Earl of Manchester, ancestor of the Earls of Halifax
- Charles Montagu (of Boughton), MP
- James Montagu, Bishop of Winchester
- Sir Sidney Montagu, MP, ancestor of the Earls of Sandwich

- Roger Montagu
- Simon Montagu
- Thomas Montagu
- William Montagu
- Elizabeth Montagu, married 1. Richard Cave, son and heir of Sir Thomas Cave of Stanford, Northamptonshire; 2. William Markham of Oakley, Northamptonshire.
- Eleanor Montagu, married George Tirrell of Thornton, Buckinghamshire.
- Isabel Montagu, married Bryan Lasscells of Gateford, Nottinghamshire.
- Mary Montagu, married William Wattes of Blakesley, Northamptonshire.
- Margaret Montagu, married Robert Woode of Colwick, Nottinghamshire
- Agnes, died unmarried.

== Gallery ==
Arms of Montagu of Boughton

Arms of Sir Edward Montagu

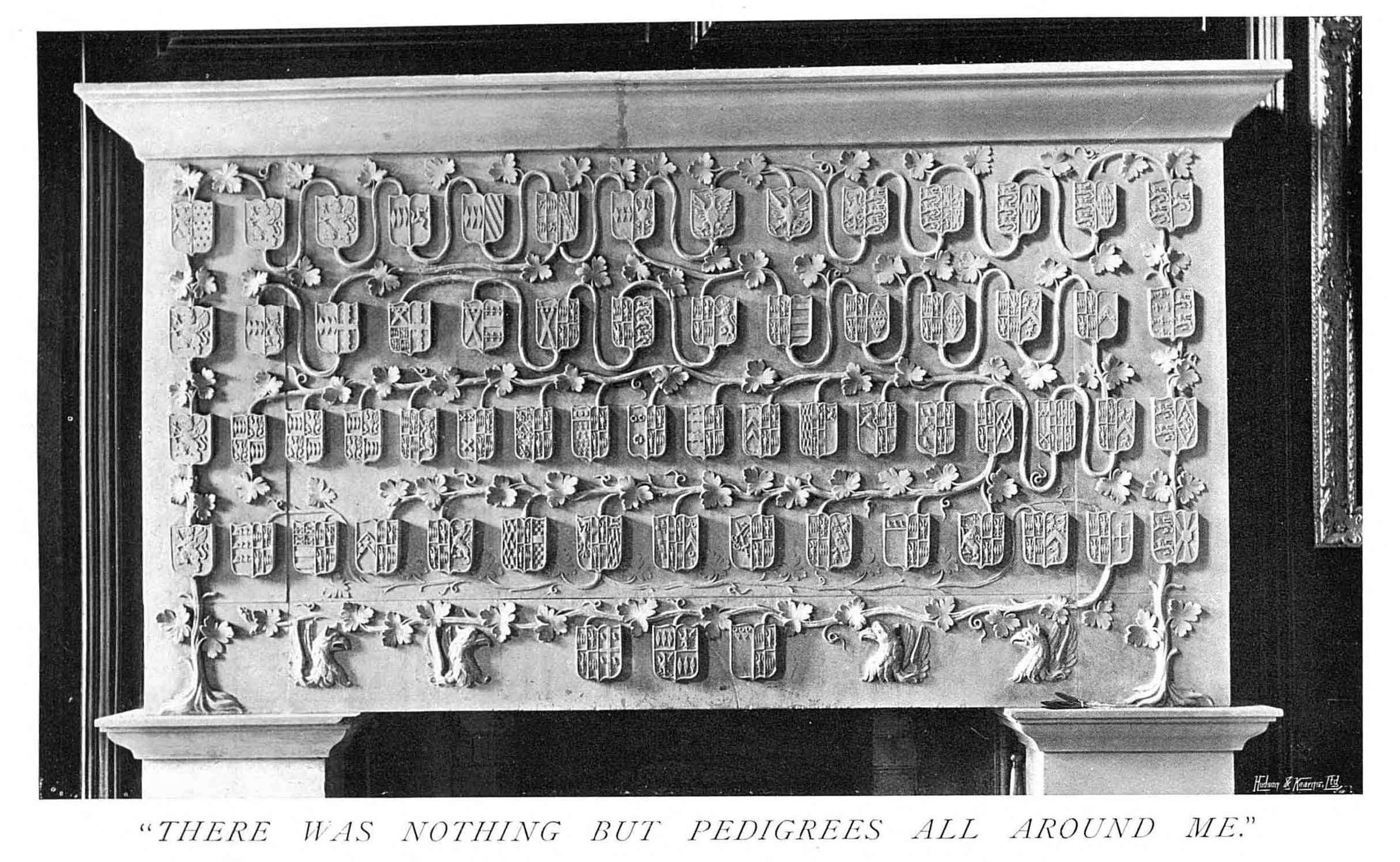
Montagu Pedigree, Heraldic Mantelpiece, Boughton House, Northamptonshire

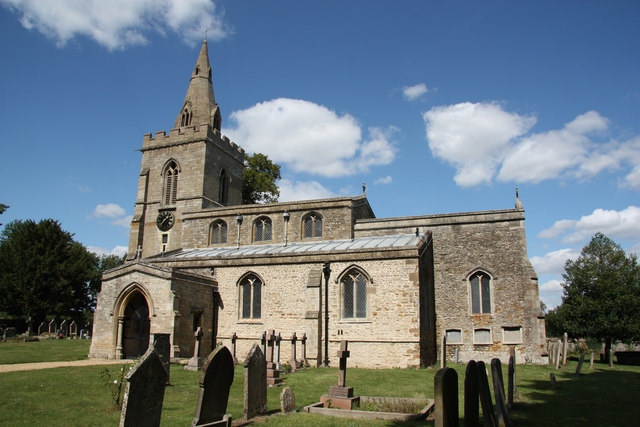
St.Marys church, Weekley

== Death ==
He died at Boughton on 10 February 1557 and was buried on 5 March with much pomp (including a "hearse of wax") in the church of St Mary, Weekley, where there is an altar tomb with his full-length effigy in robes and collar of SS and the motto "Pour unge pleasoir mille dolours" ("For every pleasure, a thousand sorrows"). His widow married as her third husband, Sir John Digby. She died in May 1563.

== See also ==
- Boughton House
- Coleridge Collar

== Sources ==
- Baker, J. H. (23 September 2004). "Montagu, Sir Edward (1480s–1557), Judge". Oxford Dictionary of National Biography (online ed.). Oxford University Press. doi:10.1093/ref:odnb/19006. (Subscription, Wikipedia Library access or UK public library membership required.)
- Collins, Arthur; Brydges, Egerton (1812). Collins's Peerage of England: Genealogical Biographical and Historical. Vol. 2. Greatly Augmented and Continued to the Present Time, by Sir Egerton Brydges, K. J. London: Printed for F. C. and J. Rivington Otridge and Son. OCLC 3986749.
- Foss, Edward (1870). Biographia Juridica: A Biographical Dictionary of the Judges of the England from the Conquest to the Present Time, 1066-1870. London: John Murray. OCLC 154151693.
- Ives, Eric (2009). Lady Jane Grey: A Tudor Mystery. Chichester: Wiley-Blackwell. ISBN 9781405194136.
- Metcalfe, Walter C., ed. (1887). The Visitations of Northamptonshire Made in 1564 and 1618-19, with Northamptonshire Pedigrees from Various Harleian MSS. London: Mitchell and Hughes. pp. 17, 37, 114–115. OCLC 807194019.
- Owen, David (1981). "Watson, Edward (c.1549-1617), of Rockingham, Northants". In Hasler, P. W. (ed.). The History of Parliament: the House of Commons 1558-1603 – via History of Parliament Online.
- Pratt, Tony; Repko, Karen (23 March 2019) [2010]. The Montagu Family: The Montagus of Lackham and their Historical Connections (PDF). The Manor of Lackham. Vol. 3. Wiltshire College Lackham. Archived from the original (PDF) on 16 December 2022.
- Rigg, James McMullen (1894). "Montagu, Edward (d.1557)". In Lee, Sidney (ed.). Dictionary of National Biography. Vol. 38. London: Smith, Elder & Co.
- Stokes, Ethel (1936). "The Ancestry of Sir Edward Montagu of Boughton, Chief Justice of the King's Bench 1539". In Doubleday, H. A.; Lord Howard de Walden (eds.). The Complete Peerage: or A History of the House of Lords and All its Members From the Earliest Times, by G.E.C. Vol. 9 (revised ed.). London: St Catherine Press. pp. 25–29 (Appendix D).
- Venn, John; Venn, J. A. (1924). Alumni Cantabrigienses, A Biographical List of All Known Students, Graduates and Holders of Office at the University of Cambridge, From the Earliest Times to 1900. Part 1: From the Earliest Times to 1751. Vol. 3. Cambridge: Cambridge University Press. p. 201.
- Wise, Charles (1888). The Montagus of Boughton and their Northamptonshire Homes. Kettering: W. E & J. Goss. OCLC 319927684.
- Wise, Charles (1891). Rockingham Castle and the Watsons. London: Elliot Stock. OCLC 902976023.

Legal offices
Preceded by John Fitz-James	Lord Chief Justice; 1539–1545	Succeeded by Richard Lyster
Preceded by Sir John Baldwin	Chief Justice of the Common Pleas; 1545–1553	Succeeded by Sir Richard Morgan
Honorary titles
Preceded by ?	Custos Rotulorum of Rutland bef. 1544–1557	Succeeded by Kenelm Digby
