= All Saints' Church, Bakewell =

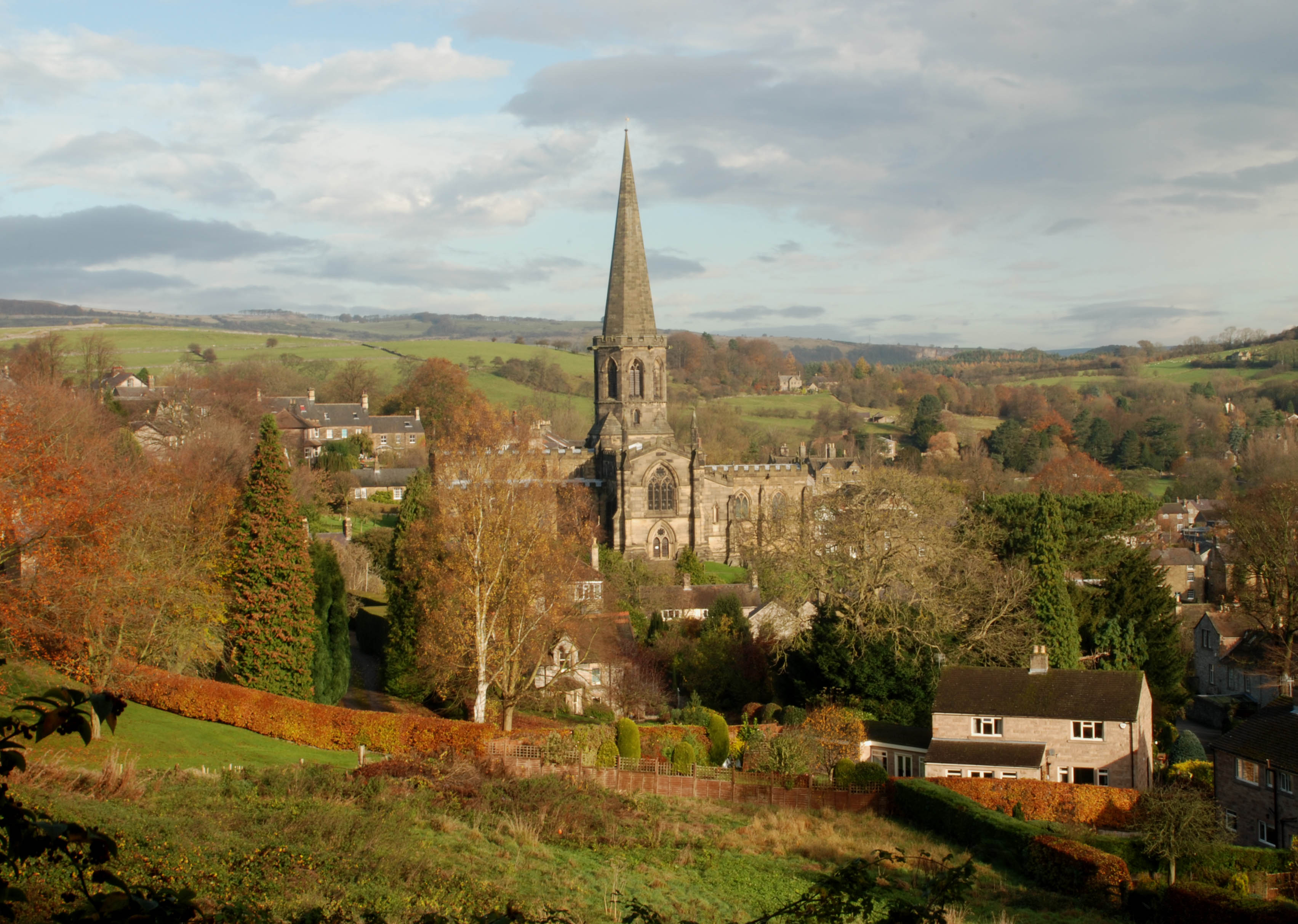
- All Saints' Church, Bakewell

- Location within Derbyshire
- 53°12′46.44″N 1°40′42.96″W
- OS grid reference: SK 21556 68483
- Location: Bakewell, Derbyshire
- Country: England
- Denomination: Church of England
- Website: bakewellchurch.co.uk

History
- Founded: 920
- Dedication: All Saints

Architecture
- Heritage designation: Grade I listed

Administration
- Province: Canterbury
- Diocese: Derby
- Archdeaconry: Derbyshire Peak and Dales
- Deanery: Peak
- Parish: Bakewell

Clergy
- Bishop: Right Revd Libby Lane
- Vicar: Revd Canon Tony Kaunhoven

All Saints' Church, Bakewell, is the parish church of Bakewell, Derbyshire, England. It is a Grade I listed building.

== The first church ==
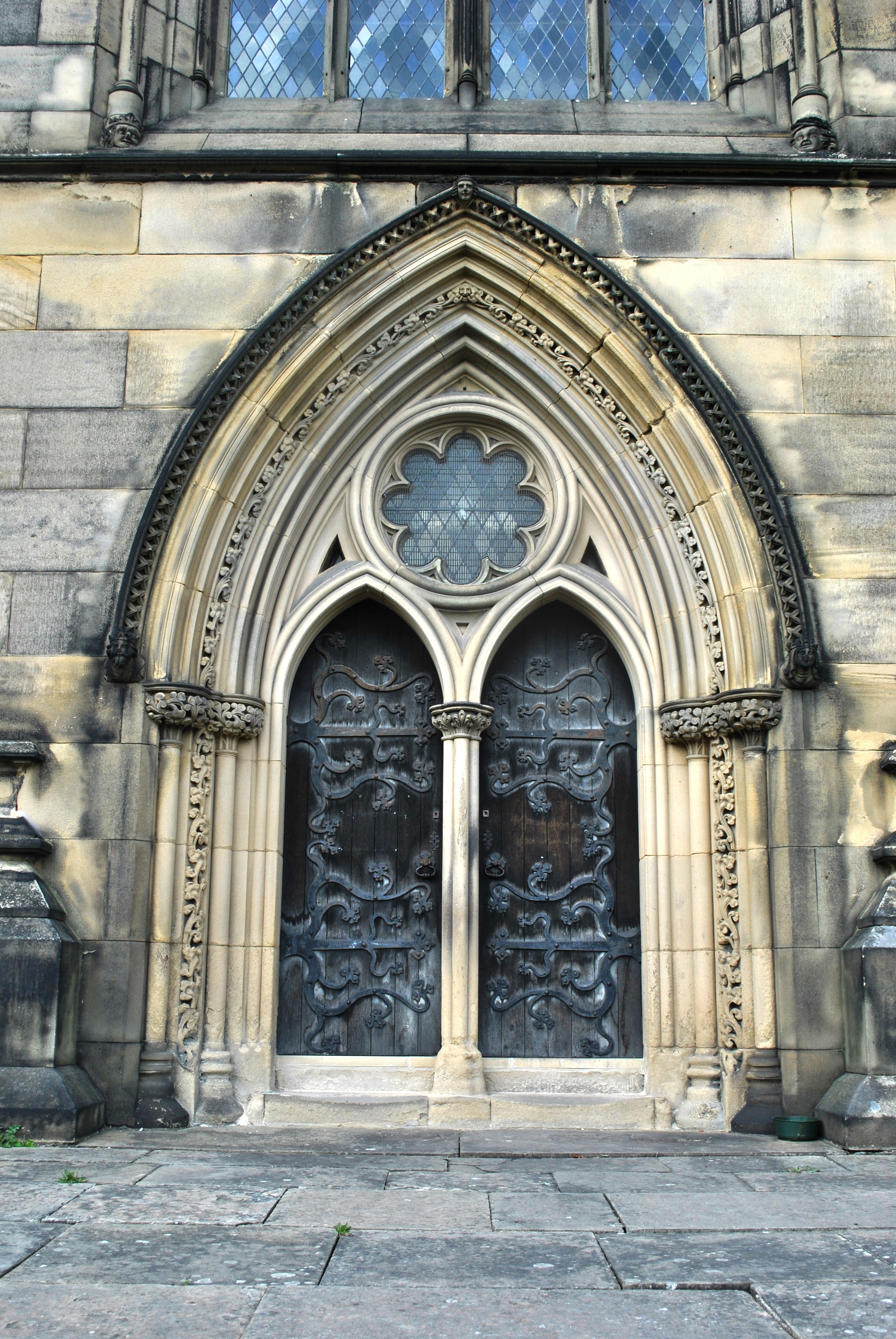
All Saints' Church, Bakewell

The church was founded in 920, during Anglo-Saxon times and the churchyard has two 9th-century crosses. During restoration work, in the 1840s, many carved fragments of Anglo-Saxon stonework were found in and around the porch, as well as some ancient stone coffins.

== The present church ==
The present church was started in the 12th century in Norman style; however, only the west front and part of the nave survive from that time. The remainder of the church was built between 1220 and 1240. The spire was added in 1340 but, was taken down in 1825, and the tower also removed in 1830. Before the restoration work the church measurements were from the level of the church floor to the top of the spire 180 feet (55 m), from east to west 153 feet (47 m), transepts from north to south 106 feet (32 m).

Between 1841 and 1844, it was almost completely rebuilt, as part of the restoration by William Flockton, as it had become dangerous. Once the external works were completed in 1844, internal restorations were undertaken. The church was re-pewed throughout. The Norman piers from the nave were substituted for Early English Gothic style ones, and steam heating was introduced. This work was carried out by Mr Bath of Haddon under the supervision of the architects John Grey Weightman and Matthew Ellison Hadfield of Sheffield. The church re-opened on 4 September 1851.

The chancel was restored between 1879 and 1882 by George Gilbert Scott Jr. The restoration was carried out at the expense of the Ven. Archdeacon Balston, vicar, with the outside walls being paid for by the Ecclesiastical commissioners. A new screen was provided under the chancel arch, with carving mimicking that on the screen in the Vernon Chapel. A new pavement of marble was laid. In the sanctuary, a new reredos was installed, with an engraving of the scene on Mount Calvary. The woodwork was done by Mr Elwell of Beverley. The walls by Burlison and Grylls, the floor by Belham of Buckingham Palace Road, London and the marble work by Twigg of Ashford.

A north vestry was added in 1897–98 at a cost of £700 (equivalent to £78,700 in 2025). The architects were Naylor and Sale of Derby, and the contractor T. Allsop and Son of Bakewell. The vestry was fitted out with furniture from Booth and Wright of Bakewell, and the woodwork was installed by Groom and Co of Bakewell and Matlock. It was dedicated by the Bishop of Southwell on 15 May 1898.

In 1906–07 the nave roof was repaired by Charles Hodgson Fowler. He fixed a large crane on an elevated timber platform just over the roof of the south porch, and covered the nave with a temporary iron roof. The crane was used to remove the old roof timbers. Oak trees from Holton Park, Oxfordshire were selected for the new roof timbers. Hodgson Fowler also replaced the tie beams and the wall plates. The cost of restoration was £445 (equivalent to £46,300 in 2025).

=== Misericords ===
All Saints' contains three early-15th-century misericords, along with eighteen 19th-century misericords in the choir stalls. Additionally, there is one 19th-century misericord on a priest's seat. The 19th-century misericords date from 1881.

== Relics and monuments ==
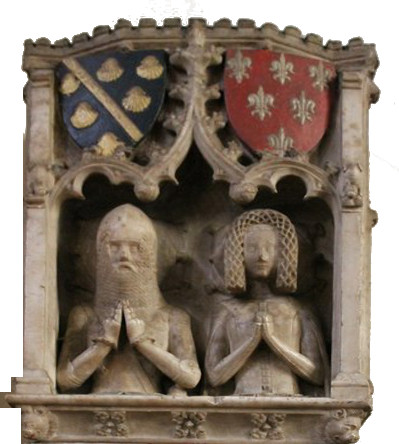
Since 1376 Godfrey and Avena de Foljambe, Lord Chief Justice of Ireland, have appeared to look out of an alabaster window.

The church has some interesting relics of the Vernon and Manners families as well as a fine 14th-century baptismal font. In the Vernon Chapel (off the South aisle) there are several magnificent tombs: Sir Thomas Wensley (killed at the Battle of Shrewsbury in 1403); John Vernon of Haddon Hall, who died in 1477; and Sir George Vernon and his two wives.

Sir George, nicknamed 'King of the Peak', died in 1567, is famous as the father of Dorothy Vernon, who eloped with John Manners, both of whom have a monument at the South end of the chapel. There is also a monument to their son, George Manners and his wife Grace.

Outside the chapel is a much smaller 14th-century alabaster monument to Sir Godfrey de Foljambe (died 1376) and his wife Avena (died 1382). The monument is said to be very rare, with only two of that age surviving to the present day. It shows Foljambe and his wife as if they are looking out of a window, and this can still be seen on the south wall. Below the mural is an explanatory inscription, but this dates from only 1803 and was "added by Mr Blore".

== Stained glass ==
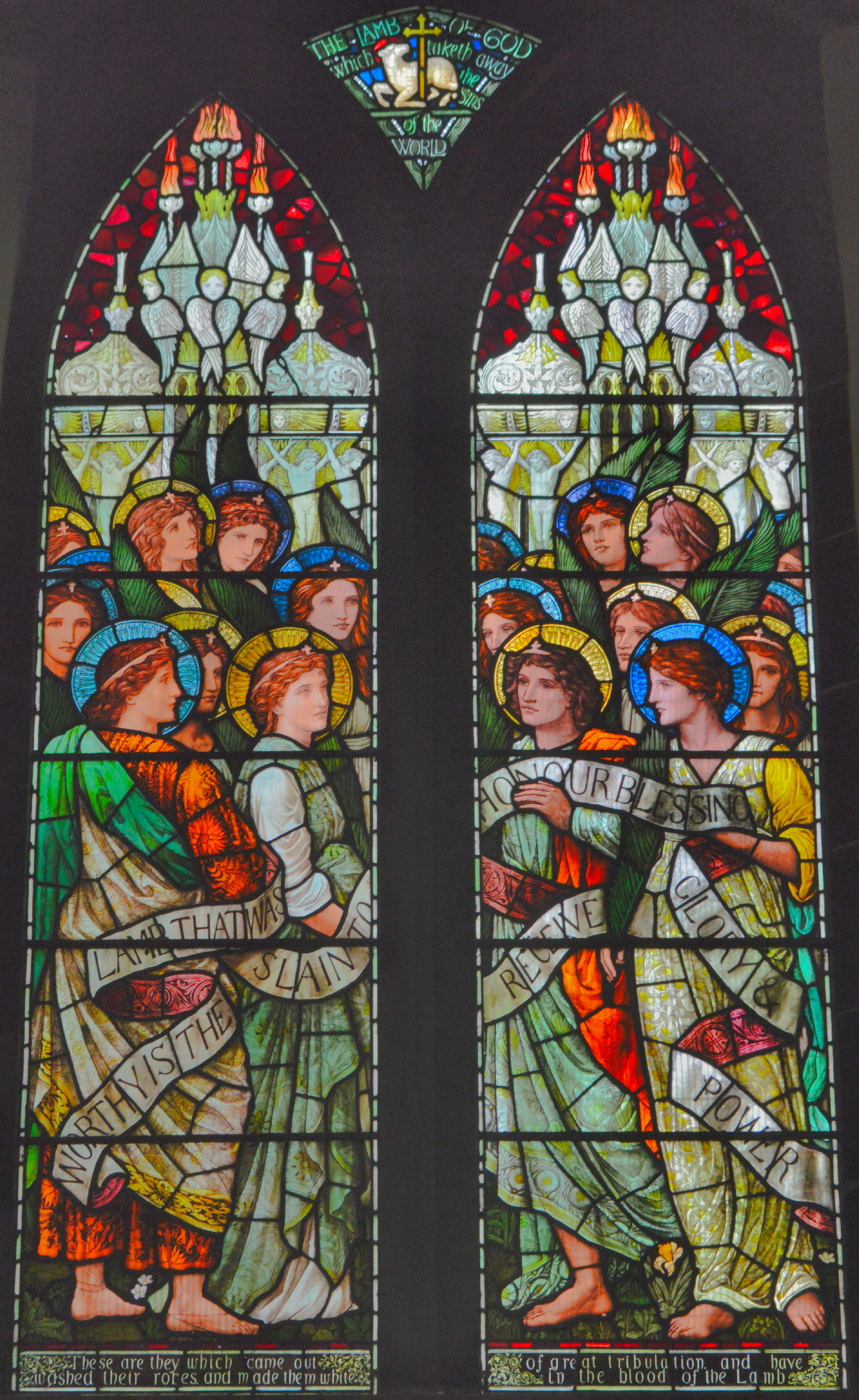
- Saints and Angels adoring the Lamb of God by Henry Holiday
  North aisle window of 1893 by Henry Holiday depicting Saints and Angels adoring the Lamb of God
- North aisle window by Charles Eamer Kempe depicting St George and St Hubert
- Chancel east window of 1892
- North transept window of 1881 by Hardman & Co.
- Resurrection window in Vernon Chapel, 1859 also by Hardman & Co.
- South transept south window, 1851 by William Wailes.

== Vicars of Bakewell ==
The majority of this list is taken from an article in the Sheffield Independent on 30 July 1901.

- Henry of Lexington. Rector. Dean of Lincoln 1253
- Peter, Rector 1254
- Robert, Vicar, 1272
- John de Osmundeston 1286–1323
- Robert Bernard 1327–1331
- Walter de Newton 1331
- Gervase de Hassop 1333–1343
- William de Snell
- William de Kyrtelington 1349–1365
- Roger de TIbshelf 1365–1405
- John de Burton 1409–1418
- John Huckyns 1424
- Thomas Stavndon 1428
- William Brome 1435–1439
- Richard Crichelowe 1457–1469
- Thomas Crichelowe 1474
- Thomas Heyward 1481–1493
- Thomas Forte 1493–1494
- William Massey 1494
- John Wilcock 1511–1512
- Richard Hoton 1512–1533
- Richard Gwent 1533–1537
- Edmund Webster 1537
- Ralph Clayton 1569–1605
- Edmund Clayton 1605
- Hamlet Charlton 1609–1614
- John Rowlandson 1615–1649
- John Rowlandson Jun. 1650–1662
- John Beardmore 1662–1668
- Christopher Lawson 1668–1672
- Edward Smith 1672–1673
- Thomas Wilson 1673–1708
- Gorstelow Monck 1708–1724
- Jonathan Birch 1724–1735
- Thomas Grove 1735–1769
- Richard Weston 1769
- Richard Chapman 1769–1816
- Francis Hodgson 1816–1840 Archdeacon of Derby
- Hubert Kestell Cornish 1840–1869
- Edward Balston 1869–1891 Archdeacon of Derby
- Charles F. Thornewill 1892–1894
- Edward T. Billings 1894–1897
- Charles T. Abraham 1897–1918
- Edmund Spink 1919–1931
- Arthur E.J.B. Barrow 1931–1938
- Norman S. Kidson 1939–1955
- George Sinker 1955–1962
- Charles R. Heywood 1962–1973
- Edmund R. Urquhart 1973–2005
- Anthony P. Kaunhoven 2007–current

== Organ ==
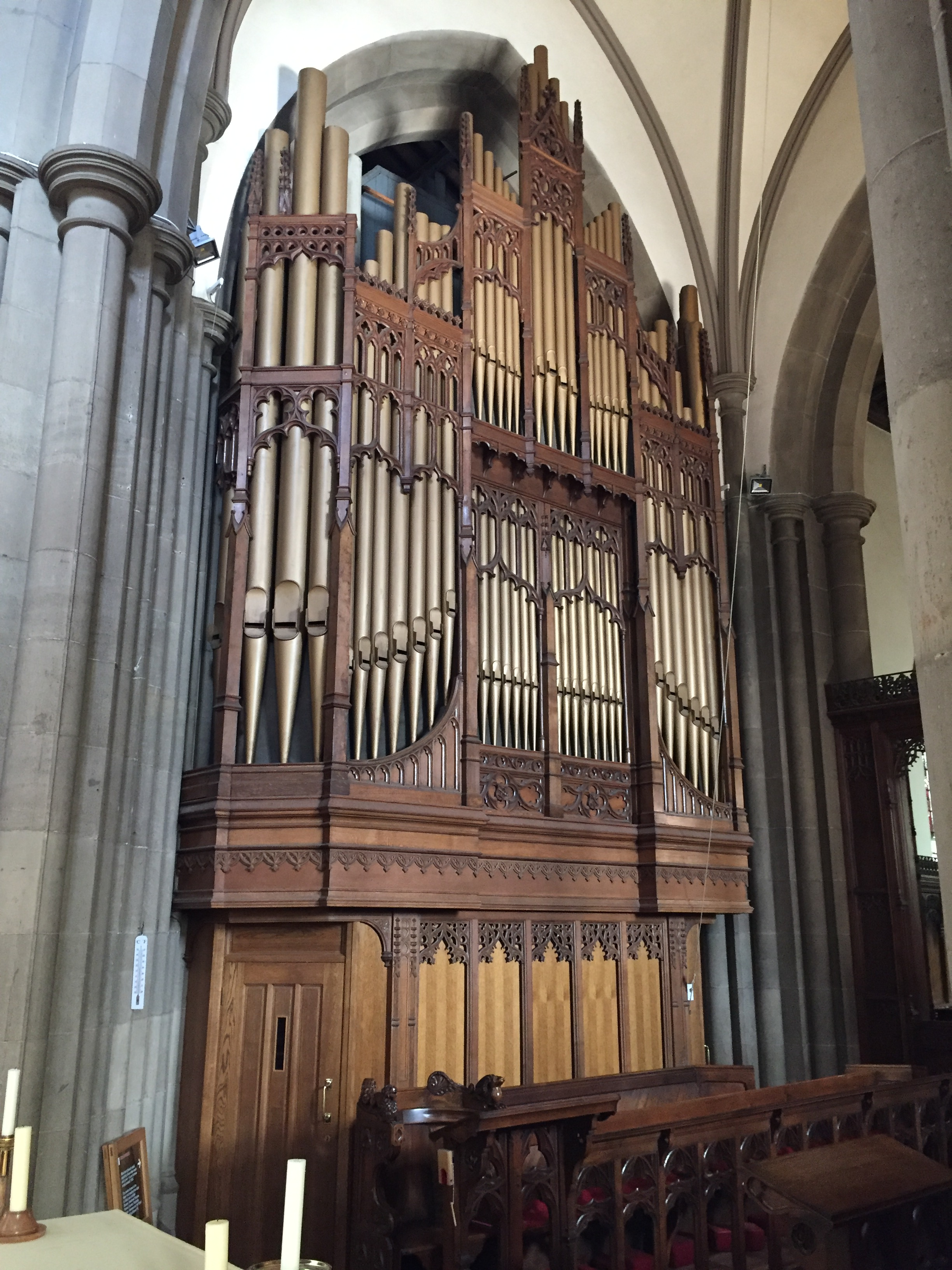
The organ case

The organ dates from 1810 when a "finger organ" by J Lincoln was installed. This was rebuilt in 1851 by William Hill, but this appears to have been unsatisfactory as it was rebuilt again in 1859 and again in 1883 by Brindley & Foster. Further work by Jardine and Co in 1954 and George Sixsmith in 1989 have left the church with a 3 manual 42 speaking stop pipe organ. A specification of the organ can be found on the British Institute of Organ Studies National Pipe Organ Register at N00212.

=== Organists ===
- John Fritche 1846–1860
- Mr. Craddock of Truro 1860–1864
- Mr. Hopper 1864–1868
- W.H. Marsden 1868–1869
- Frederick Burgess 1869–1873
- C.C. Mitchell 1873–1877
- Thomas Barker Mellor 1877–1913
- G.C.E. Eyres 1913–???? (formerly organist of Walsall Parish Church)
- W.E. Cave 1913–1932 (afterwards organist of Whitby Parish Church)
- T.H. Mosley 1932–???? (previously organist of St Peter's Church, Edensor, Derbyshire)
- Glyn Davies 1982–2016
- Neil Clarke 2016–2018
- Christopher Matthew Dell 2019–

== The church today ==
Today, along with its regular religious services, the church is an important building in the town and the wider Peak District. It is used for, amongst other things, concerts by Bakewell Choral Society and the annual Commemoration service of Lady Manners School when they staff and pupils give thanks to Grace, Lady Manners, for founding their school in 1636.

The church website has much more information about the ongoing life and worship of the parish, including forthcoming services and other events.

== Parish status ==
The church is in a joint parish with:

- Holy Trinity Church, Ashford-in-the-Water
- St Anne's Church, Over Haddon
- St Katherine's Church, Rowsley
- St Michael and All Angels' Church, Sheldon

== See also ==
- Grade I listed churches in Derbyshire
- Listed buildings in Bakewell

== Gallery ==
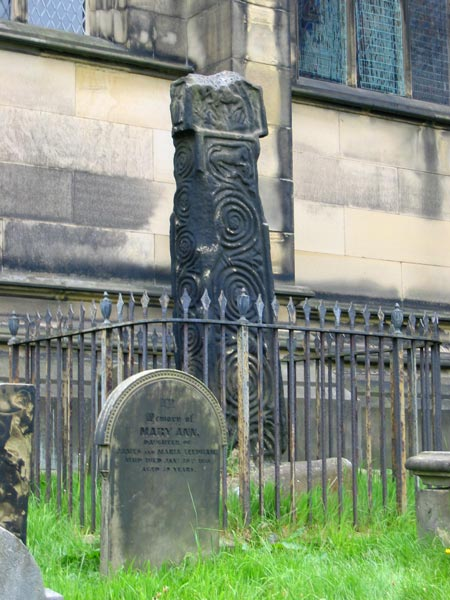
9th-century cross in the churchyard
