= Edward Watson (died 1617) =

English MP (c. 1549–1617)

The Honourable Sir Edward Watson
- Arms of Watson, of Rockingham Castle: Argent, on a chevron engrailed azure between three martlets sable as many crescents or

Member of Parliament for Stamford
- In office 1601–1601

Personal details
- Born: c. 1549
- Died: 1 March 1617 (aged 67–68)
- Resting place: Rockingham church
- Spouse: Anne Digby
- Children: Lewis Watson, 1st Baron Rockingham; Edward Watson; Anne Watson; Emma Watson; Mary Watson; Catherine Watson; Elizabeth Watson.; Temperance Watson; Frances Watson; Dorothy Watson
- Parents: Edward Watson; Dorothy Montagu

Sir Edward Watson (c. 1549 – 1 March 1617) of Rockingham, Northamptonshire was an English landowner and politician. He was Sheriff of Northamptonshire from 1591 to 1592, was elected MP for Stamford in 1601 and was knighted in 1603.

Born about 1549, he was the eldest son of Edward Watson (d. 1584) of Rockingham and Dorothy, eldest daughter of Sir Edward Montagu (c. 1488–1557) of Boughton and his first wife, Cicely Lane.

He married, in April 1567, Anne (d. 1612), daughter of Kenelm Digby (d. 1590) of Stoke Dry, Rutland, with whom he had two sons and eight daughters:

- Lewis Watson, 1st Baron Rockingham (1584 – 1653)
- Edward Watson (bap. 25 January 1586)
- Anne Watson (bap. 22 September 1569) married Sir Charles Norwich of Brampton Ash, Northamptonshire.
- Emma Watson married John Graunte of North Bucks, Warwickshire.
- Mary Watson married Sir Anthony Maney of Lutton, Kent.
- Catherine Watson married Sir Thomas Palmer of East Carlton, Northamptonshire.
- Elizabeth Watson married, firstly, Sir John Nedham (d. 1618); secondly, Sir Edward Tyrrell of Thornton, Buckinghamshire.
- Temperance Watson married Thomas Dolman.
- Frances Watson married Rowland Vaughan of London.
- Dorothy Watson married Sir George Throgmorton of Fulbrook.
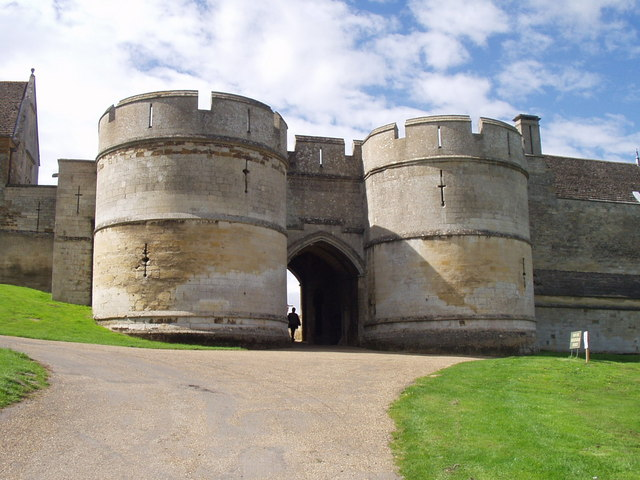
Rockingham Castle, Northamptonshire, seat of the Watson family

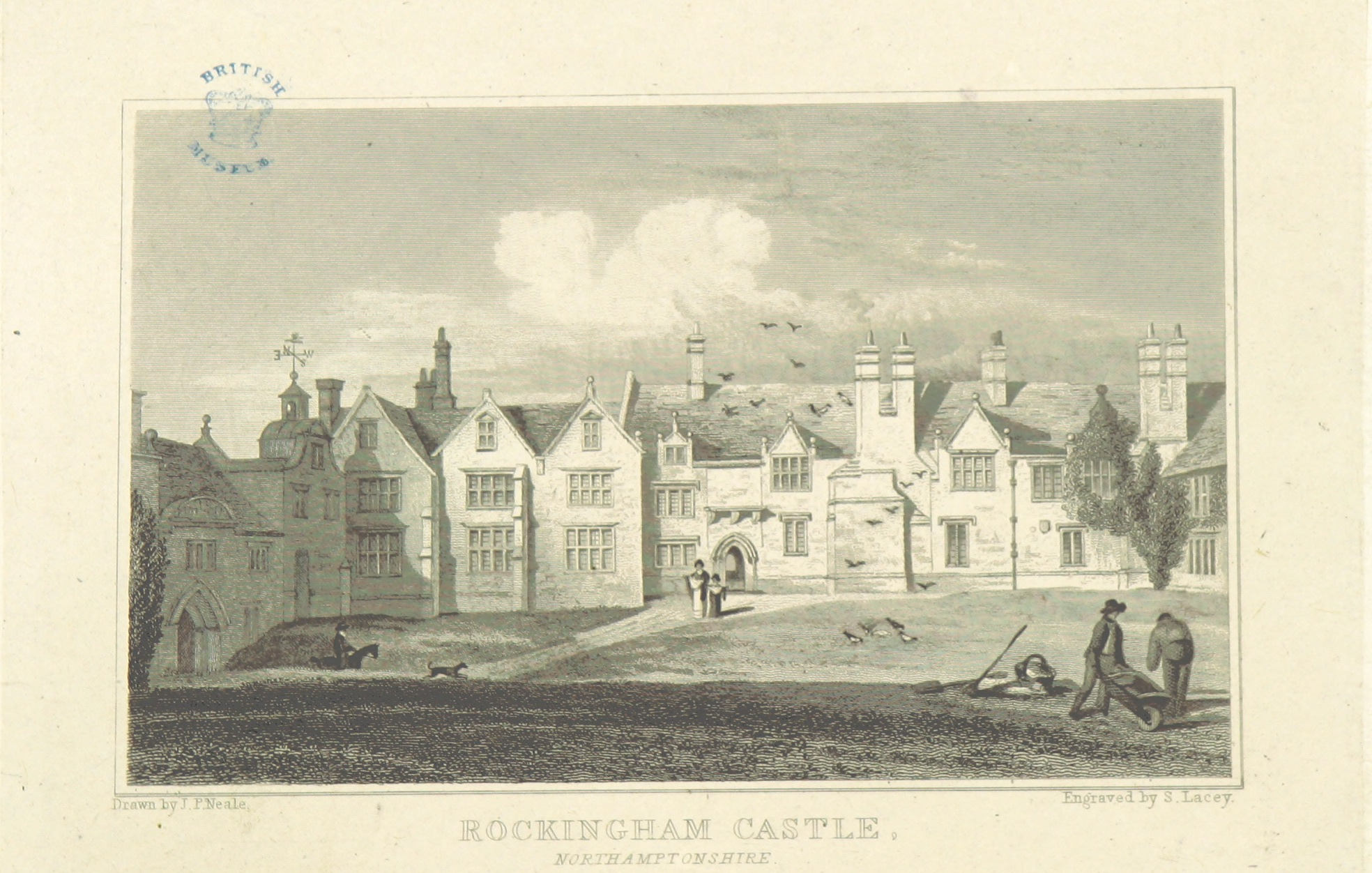
Rockingham Castle, Northamptonshire

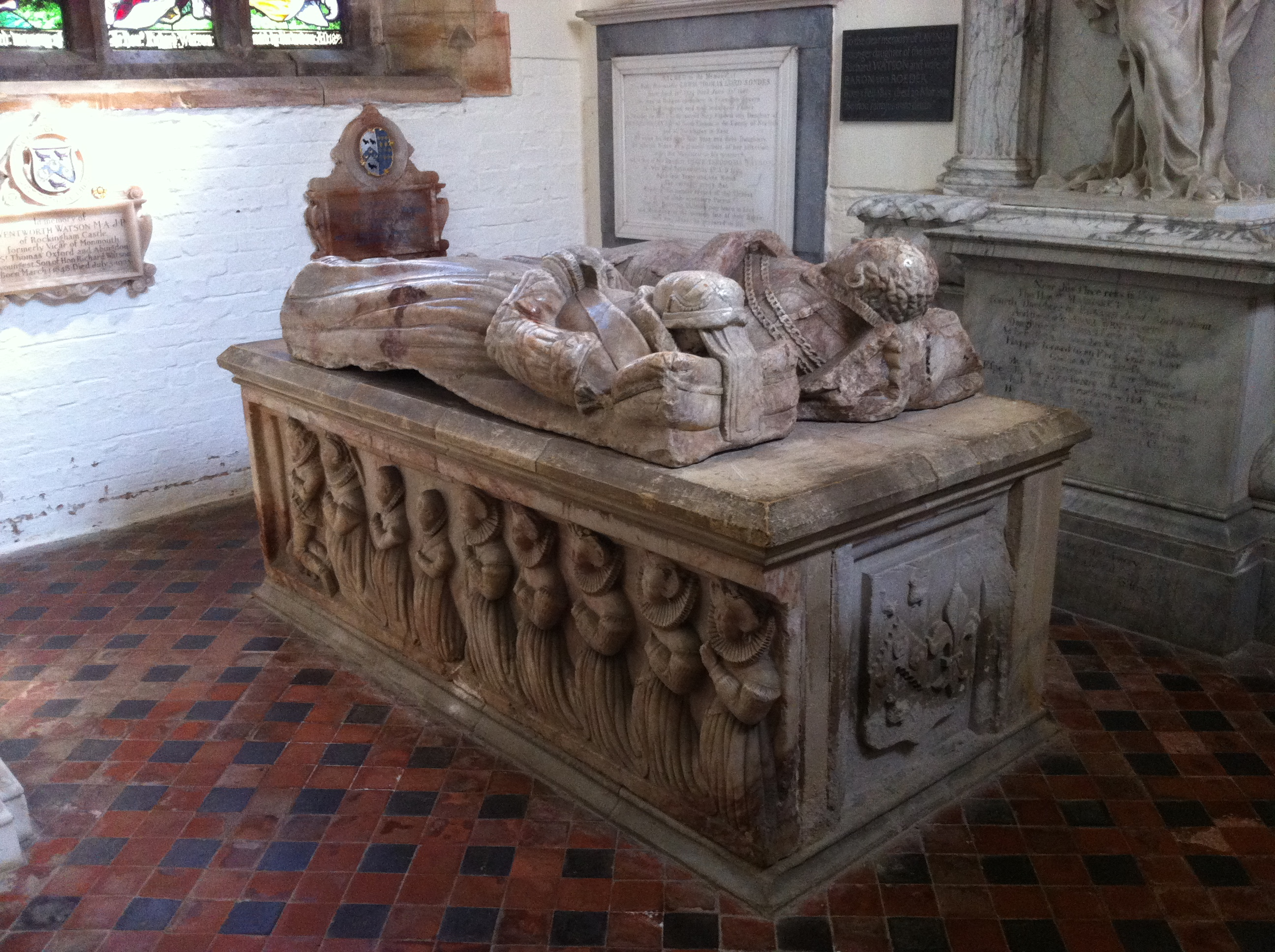
Memorial in St Leonard's Church, Rockingham, erected by Lewis Watson, 1st Baron Rockingham (1584-1653) after the Civil War

Watson was knighted by James I at the Charterhouse on 11 May 1603 and the king was his guest for three days in 1605. In 1613 Watson made over his estates to his eldest son, Sir Lewis. He died 1 March 1617 and was buried 4 March at Rockingham.

== Sources ==
- Bennett, Martyn (23 September 2004). "Watson, Lewis, first Baron Rockingham (bap. 1584, d. 1653), landowner". Oxford Dictionary of National Biography (online ed.). Oxford University Press. doi:10.1093/ref:odnb/28853. (Subscription, Wikipedia Library access or UK public library membership required.)
- Metcalfe, Walter C. (1885). A Book of Knights Banneret Knights of the Bath and Knights Bachelor, Made between the Fourth Year of King Henry VI and the Restoration of King Charles II and Knights Made in Ireland between the Years 1566 and 1698, Together with an Index of Names. London: Mitchell and Hughes. OCLC 5319383.
- Metcalfe, Walter C., ed. (1887). The Visitations of Northamptonshire Made in 1564 and 1618-19, with Northamptonshire Pedigrees from Various Harleian MSS. London: Mitchell and Hughes. pp. 37, 114–115. OCLC 807194019.
- Owen, David (1981). "Watson, Edward (c.1549-1617), of Rockingham, Northants". In Hasler, P. W. (ed.). The History of Parliament: the House of Commons 1558-1603 – via History of Parliament Online.
- Watson, Paula; Sgroi, Rosemary (2010). "Watson, Sir Lewis (1584-1653), of Rockingham Castle, Northants". In Thrush, Andrew; Ferris, John P. (eds.). The History of Parliament: the House of Commons 1604-1629 (Online ed.).
- Wise, Charles (1891). Rockingham Castle and the Watsons. London: Elliot Stock. OCLC 902976023.
