= Lady Manners School =

Location
- Shutts Lane; Bakewell, Derbyshire, DE45 1JA; England
- 53°12′22″N 1°41′01″W

Information
- Type: Comprehensive foundation school
- Motto: Pour y parvenir (Strive to Attain)
- Established: 1636; 390 years ago
- Founder: Grace, Lady Manners
- Local authority: Derbyshire
- Department for Education URN: 112996 Tables
- Ofsted: Reports
- Headteacher: Gary Peat
- Gender: Coeducational
- Age: 11 to 18
- Enrollment: 1515
- Former pupils: Old Mannerians
- Website: Lady Manners School

Lady Manners School is an English secondary school located in Bakewell, a market town in the Peak District National Park, Derbyshire. It was founded on 20 May 1636 by Grace, Lady Manners, who lived at Haddon Hall, the current home of Lord and Lady Edward Manners, and has also in the past been known as the Bakewell Grammar School.

== History ==
Lady Manners has a long history of providing education in the Peak District area. It began as a boys' school, but later changed to admit girls as well. It was a successful grammar school, but later changed to become a comprehensive school.

=== Beginnings ===
In May 1636 Grace, Lady Manners bought some land at Elton which was to provide an annual income of £15 for "the mayntayninge of a Schoolemaister for ever to teach a free Schoole within the Townshippe of Bakewell, for the better instructinge of the male children of the Inhabitants of Bakewell and Great Rowsley aforesaid..."

The schoolmaster would "be appointed by the Lords of the Manor of Haddon, in the said Countie of Derby, being the heires or posteritie of the said Grace, Ladie Manners..." and as with the Pursglove Grammar School in Tideswell, the deed stipulated that the schoolmaster was to remain unmarried, and "if the said Schoolemaister shall at any time afterward marry, or shall live disorderly or scandalously, that then the said Schoolemaister shall have noe benefitt by the said Annuitie or rente charge, but shall be displaced from the said Schoole". Additional to his annuity, the schoolmaster was permitted to take a registration fee of a shilling for each new boy. Additionally the schoolmaster would have received a pay rise following Grace's death as her 1649 will allowed for all the monies generated by the land at Elton to be used for school use (during her life she had kept 25% of the income). The school is first referred to as a "Grammer Schoole" in her will.

The original school day ran from 7 to 11 a.m. and 1 to 5 p.m. "except Sundays and holidays".

=== 19th century ===
In 1806 the schoolmaster, Rev. M. Chapman handed over to the Rev. J. Browne who was appointed by the Duke of Rutland receiving an annual salary of £50 and, for a while, the school became known as "Mr. Browne's".

Up until now, the school had shared accommodation with the older Chantry School, South Church Street, Bakewell. In 1826, the school moved around the corner to the Old Town Hall King Street. The Old Town Hall had been built in 1709 and, as well as being Town Hall, and Buttermarket, the upper floor had been used for Court and Quarter Sessions.

In 1846 Rev. T. Hurst, a graduate of Pembroke College, Cambridge, and a curate at the Parish Church, took over as schoolmaster.

According to White's Directory of Derbyshire (1857) –

Bakewell Grammar School, King street, established in 1637, (see Charities) is conducted by Mr Wm. Kay, L.C.P., assisted by the undernamed resident masters. The school is now in a very flourishing state, numbering 67 pupils, of whom 30 are boarders, 25 daily, and 12 foundation pupils. Mr. Wm. Kay, L.C.P., Head master. Mr. Ascough, second master. Mr. W. Mann, Third master. Herr J. B. Burke, German master. Mons. C. De St. Hubert, French and Drawing master... The New Market House is in King street, and the rooms above the basement are occupied by the Free Grammar school.

Under Charities, White's Directory adds "Lady Manners, in 1637, left a rent charge of £15 per annum, out of lands at Elton, to a schoolmaster, for the instruction of male children of the township of Bakewell and Great Rowsley. The master also receives a voluntary addition of £40 from the Duke of Rutland, making in the whole, £55 per annum; and according to the revised regulations and rules, 20 youths are admitted on the foundation, on the payment of 1s. for registration, and instructed in English generally, Latin, and Greek. at 5s. 3d. per quarter. Mr. Wm. Kay, L.C.P., the master, has good accommodation for boarders, at his own residence, Bridge street."

In 1862 the school was briefly annexed to Mr. William Kay's private Grammar and Commercial Academy in Bridge Street but remained in the King Street premises. A School Inquiry Report of 1866 states that the Foundation had become "a mere appendage and advertisement to an inferior commercial boarding school kept by the headmaster". At this time "there were then thirty-two boarders, fourteen dayboys not on the Foundation, and seven who were".

When Mr. Kay died in 1874, Archdeacon Balston, then Vicar of Bakewell, and a former Headmaster of Eton, recommended that the school should be closed, and in the absence of a suitable successor the monies from Lady Manners' Foundation should be allowed to accumulate. The school closed in 1874, and remained closed for 22 years. Lady Manners School ceased to exist.

=== A new start ===
The Charity Commissioners decided that a new building could be built "to be used as a grammar school by day, earning through its examinations grants from the Science and Art Department, and as a centre for technical classes in the evenings". The new school backed onto Bath Gardens and was opened on 22 September 1896. The school now admitted girls as well as boys – a pre-condition of the County Council's grant of £600 towards the building costs. This was the first time an endowed School of this type had become co-educational.

The school opened with fifty pupils on roll, all between the ages of eight and eighteen. The first Headmaster was Charles J. Mansford, B.A.(London). Subjects taught were Religious Knowledge, English, Classics, Mathematics, Science, French and Drawing. Boys did Woodwork, girls did Domestic Science. The Bakewell Show Ground was used for games. Fees were £2 per head, but this meant the school operated at a loss and so the County Council agreed to fund 12 scholarships.

The school was one of the first to establish a more modern curriculum. An article in Review of Reviews (1898) says "Within the school there is a School of Science, affiliated with South Kensington, about one half of the scholars being so classed. Girls are taught exactly the same science, for instance, as boys, and at the same time, in the same room. So far the science taught embraces Practical and Theoretical Chemistry, with Practical and Theoretical Physics".

=== The 20th century ===
In 1900 two boarding houses were set up, at Dagnall for boys, and in The Avenue for girls, and in 1909 the Old Bath House (now Haig House) was bought as extra premises for Fifth and Sixth Form, and Staff.

In 1919 four acres of land who bought in Shutts Lane for use as a playing field. This remains part of the school playing field today.

The Foundation Stone of new school buildings, on the present School site in Shutts Lane, was laid by the Duke of Rutland on 20 May 1936, on the 300th anniversary of the founding of the School by Grace, Lady Manners in 1636. The new buildings were opened on 24 February 1938.

During World War II Lady Manners School shared their building with North Manchester High School for Boys who had been evacuated. On a two-week rotation, Lady Manners pupils went to school in the morning (including Saturday), and Manchester Grammar pupils in the afternoon. The following week, this was reversed.

In the 1960s the school had around 550 boys and girls and was a voluntary controlled school.

In 1972 Grace, Lady Manners Grammar School became a secondary comprehensive, admitting all pupils within its catchment for secondary education. By the late 1970s it had around 1300 boys and girls.

The school became grant maintained in the early 1990s.

== Emblem and motto ==
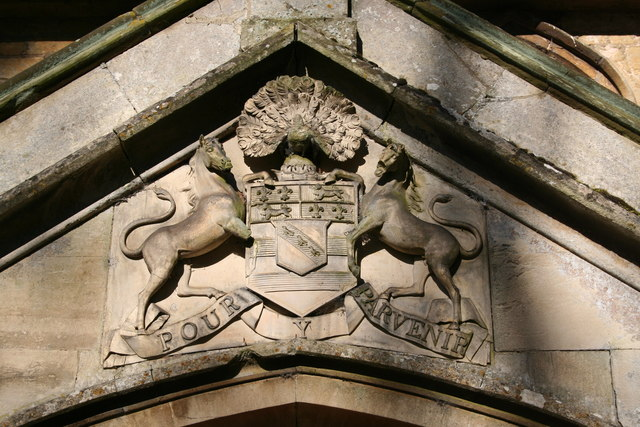
The Manners' Arms from above the south door of St. Mary's church Bloxholm.

The school's peacock emblem is the crest above the arms of the Manners family. The motto, 'Pour y parvenir', is also derived from the Manners family and its translations include "To attain", or "Strive to Attain". It now uses the three values aspire include thrive along with the motto

== The house system ==
The House system was created in 1912. At that time there were three Houses established called Town, North and South. The planning for this took place during 1911 and the reason for creating the Houses was to help develop Sport in school so that, with a competitive dimension, students would enthusiastically play for their Houses. They provided a chance for students to achieve success and enjoy friendly yet meaningful competition. So Sports Day on 21 June 1912, which was actually the Fourteenth Annual Sports Day, was the first time that the Houses competed against one another for the Wrench Shield. The first ever winners were Town House (the equivalent of the current Glossop House).

After the First World War, in 1919, the Houses were renamed and an extra House was added. The principle of allocation to the Houses was still geographical. The Houses were then called Nesfield (the South area – Matlock and beyond), Taylor (also South as far as Darley Dale), Glossop (the Bakewell 'Town' area) and Barker (the North). These names were those of Governors who had been especially important in the reopening of Lady Manners School in 1896.

In 1924 a new school was opened in Matlock (Ernest Bailey School) so fewer students came from that area and Nesfield House disappeared. Barker House also disappeared for a while at the end of 1937 because when Buxton College became a County School and the Ridgefield boarding annex was no longer needed, there were fewer students from the North area. This was a weakness of the principle of allocating students to Houses on a geographical basis. To confuse the situation a little further, there was also a 'School House' (photographs of its twenty or so members still exist for the period 1931 to 1941) which was for 'boarders'. This House did not seem to compete for the Inter-House trophies in quite the same way as the main Houses, but did have their own activities, organised internally for pupils living in the School House. By 1938, coinciding with the effective occupation of the new school buildings on Shutts Lane, the main Houses were rearranged again, now numbering four: Elton, Haddon, Glossop and Taylor.

In 1947, just after the Second World War, there was another change when the number of Houses became three again and Barker reappeared, replacing Haddon and Elton. Competition between the Houses was no longer just on the basis of sport, and other activities had become important too.

By 1959 there were plans to create a fourth House again and this time the new House was to be named Cockerton. This naming was a tribute to the Cockerton family that had given over 50 years of service to the School, firstly with Mr VR Cockerton and then with his son Mr RWP Cockerton. Both had been School Governors and Mr VR Cockerton had been actively involved in the establishing of the current school site.

So ever since the early 1960s there have been four Houses – Barker, Cockerton, Glossop and Taylor – just like now – and students are no longer allocated to these Houses according to where they live, but according to which of the pairs of form tutor groups they are in.

== New buildings ==
The school has been repeatedly extended in recent years, from the Cavendish library (named for the family surname of the Dukes of Devonshire, the influential aristocratic family of the nearby Chatsworth estate) in the 1990s to a new sixth form centre and sports facilities opened in 2005. This latest extension was funded partly by the sale of the school's boarding house, Castle Hill, which until its sale provided catered accommodation for school pupils. The boarding house closed in 2003.

== Music and orchestra ==
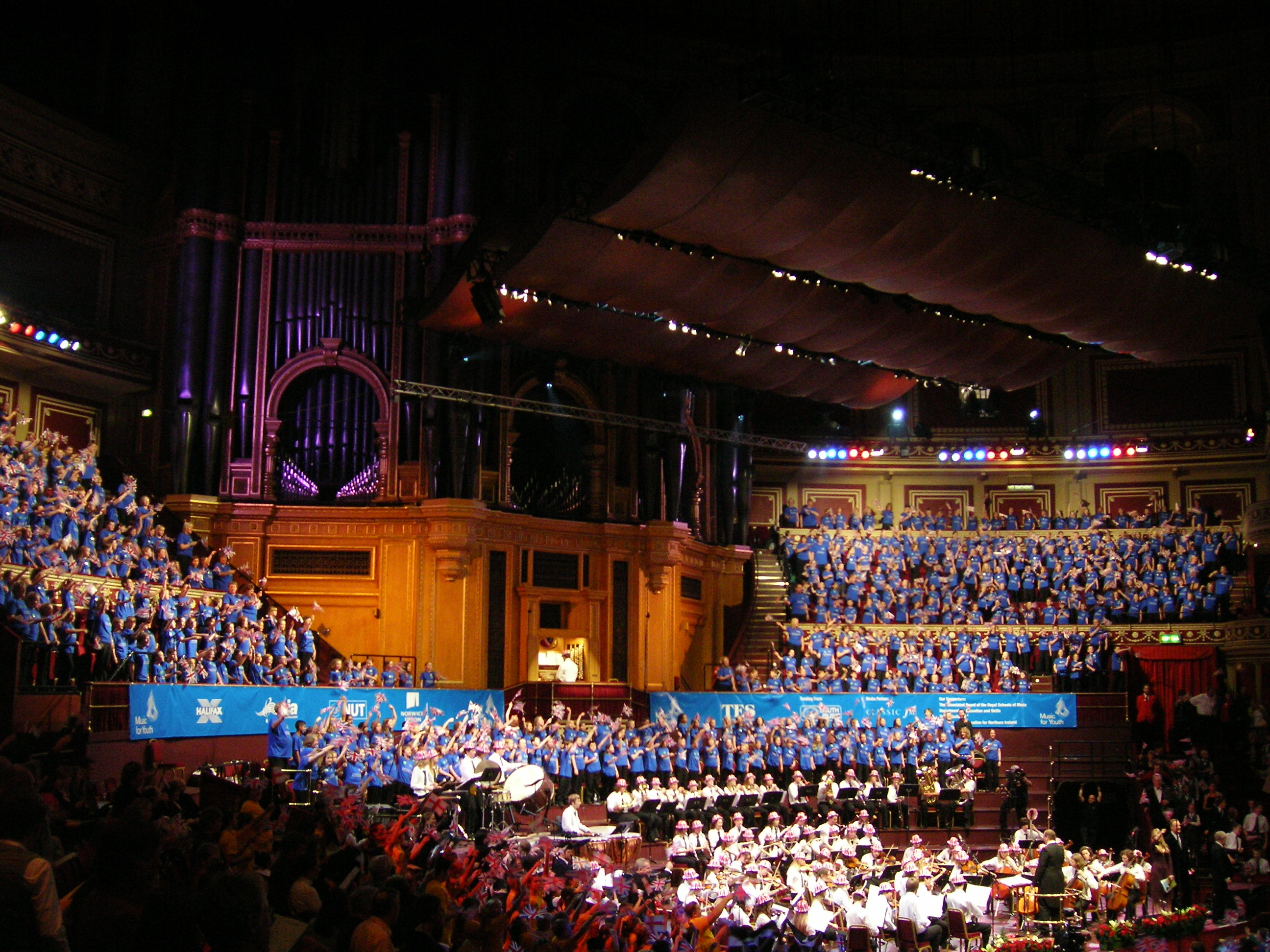
Lady Manners School Orchestra performing in the Schools' Prom at the Royal Albert Hall

Music is a major strength at the school with a wide variety of extra-curricular ensembles including Senior Orchestra (about 80 members), Senior Choir (about 100), Junior Choir (125), Brass Band (10), Senior Wind Band (60), Intermediate Strings, Junior Strings, Intermediate Wind Band, Junior Wind Band, Folk Group, clarinet choir, flute choir, etc.

In July 2004, the Lady Manners School Orchestra reached the national finals of the National Festival of Music for Youth and performed in the Royal Festival Hall, London.

In July 2005, the orchestra, conducted by Robert Steadman, was awarded "outstanding performance" at the National Festival Music for Youth Finals at Symphony Hall, Birmingham and in November 2005 they were invited to play at the Schools' Prom at the Royal Albert Hall where the 70+ strong orchestra performed a suite from John Williams' score from Jurassic Park and Elgar's Pomp & Circumstance March No. 1 (Land of Hope and Glory') with indoor fireworks and a 5,000 strong audience singing along.

In July 2007 the school's Senior String Orchestra, also conducted by Robert Steadman, was awarded "outstanding performance" at the National Festival of Music for Youth at Symphony Hall, Birmingham performing a programme of Edward Elgar, Robert Steadman and Edvard Grieg.

In July 2008, the music department managed to achieve the unprecedented by having 5 ensembles reach the National Festival of Music for Youth: the School Orchestra (who performed King Arthur a new work written by Jonathan Roberts (a 6th-form student), Nimrod from the "Enigma Variations" by Elgar and Riverdance by Bill Whelan; the String Orchestra who performed two movements from the St. Paul's Suite by Holst, the Prelude from Psycho by Bernard Hermann and Frolicsome Finale from "Simple Symphony" by Benjamin Britten; the School Jazz Orchestra who performed a programme of four works including "Birdland"; the School Brass Band; and the Senior String Quartet who performed Dvořák and Scott Joplin.

Since 2004, the music department has taken one ensemble on a short UK tour in the summer term. Most years this has been a combined brass and wind band who have visited places such as London, Edinburgh and Yorkshire giving a number of concerts. In 2009, the Senior Strings visited London and Oxford and gave performances in the Long Library, Blenheim Palace and Keble College chapel in Oxford. There are plans to take the Senior Orchestra to Hungary in summer 2010.

Last year (2017), the school orchestra made it to the Music For Youth national competition, playing in the Birmingham main concert hall. In summer 2018, the senior windband are going on tour to Bamberg, Germany, being hosted by the school there.

== Academic performance ==
It gets well above average GCSE results and A-level results. In 2010, GCSE results placed Lady Manners School 7th in Derbyshire, with 70% of students achieving 5 or more GCSEs at grades A* to C including English and Mathematics (the average in England was 53.5%). In 2011, this was bettered with 76% of GCSE students achieving 5 or more GCSEs at A* to C including English and Mathematics.

== Notable former pupils ==
=== Comprehensive ===
- Paul Aldred, former Derbyshire cricketer
- Lizzie Ball, musician
- Stephanie Hill, Miss England 2017, represented England at Miss World 2017 in Sanya, China
- Claire Askew, Former Editor Cosmopolitan Magazine
- Annie Last, professional mountain biker
- Richard Lumsden, actor, writer, composer and musician
- Becky Measures, radio DJ at Peak FM
- Madeleine Thompson
- Laura Wade, playwright

=== Grammar school ===
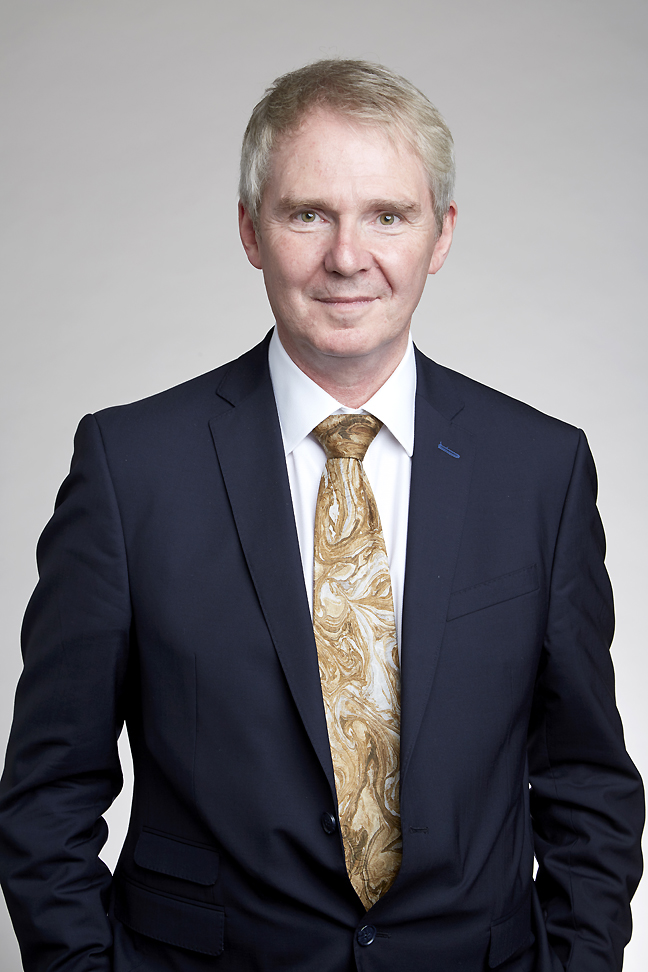
Sir Nigel Shadbolt FRS

- Barry Askew, former editor in 1981 of the News of the World, from 1961 to 1963 of the Matlock Mercury, and from 1968 to 1981 of the Sheffield Star
- Thomas Denman, (1733–1815) – physician
- Helen Goodman, former Labour MP for Bishop Auckland
- Billy Hughes, Labour MP from 1945 to 1950 for Wolverhampton West and educator
- Richard Lumsden, British actor, writer, composer and musician, former husband of actress Sophie Thompson
- Edward Milner, landscape architect
- Sir Maurice Oldfield CMG CBE, former director-general – "C" – from 1973 to 1978 of MI6
- Aydin Önaç, concert pianist, teacher, Headmaster from 2010 to 2017 of St Olave's Grammar School
- Julie Price, co-principal bassoonist of the BBC Symphony Orchestra
- Sir Nigel Shadbolt FRS FREng, Principal since 2015 of Jesus College, Oxford, founded the Web Science Trust
- Alison Uttley, writer
- Phillip Whitehead, former Labour MEP from 1994 to 2005 for the East Midlands, former chairman of the European Parliamentary Labour Party, television producer and Labour MP from 1970 to 1983 for Derby North
- Michael Wynne-Parker, author and businessman

== External links and sources ==
- The school's official website
- Article by Roy Hattersley in THE GUARDIAN, 27 September 2005
- 2011 OFSTED Report
- "The Story of the School of Grace Lady Manners, Bakewell" by R.A. Harvey, published J.W. Northend, Sheffield, 1982.
