= John Fitzjames =

John Fitzjames may refer to:

- Sir John FitzJames, Lord Chief Justice of the King's Bench, 1526–1539
- Sir John Fitzjames (MP), English politician
