= Becky Measures =

British radio presenter

Rebecca Helen Measures (born 13 October 1981 in Derbyshire, England), from Bakewell, Derbyshire, is a freelance radio presenter and a professional charity fund-raiser.

She presented the Sunday mid-morning show across BBC Yorkshire on BBC Radio Leeds, BBC Radio Sheffield and BBC Radio York, as well as being a regular cover presenter on BBC Radio Sheffield, and presenting the Saturday Breakfast show across BBC East Midlands on BBC Radio Derby, BBC Radio Leicester and BBC Radio Nottingham between 2023 and 2025. Before this, she was the host of the breakfast show on Peak FM, an independent local radio station in Derbyshire.

In June 2025, Measures left her weekend BBC radio roles and became the presenter of the weekday breakfast show on BBC Radio Derby.

Before radio, she held a variety of jobs including being an extra for the locally filmed television series Peak Practice before moving into radio.

In 2004, Measures, then 23, decided to have a double mastectomy after a genetic test revealed that she had an 80 to 90 per cent risk of developing breast cancer: she is a BRCA1 gene carrier. Both her mother and a cousin, Helen, had suffered from the same illness. On 6 June 2006, ITV broadcast a documentary entitled My Breasts or My Life about her decision to have her breasts removed. The programme, filmed over two years, follows the decision and preparation for the operation as well as her, and her family's, feelings afterwards.

To help raise funds to build Europe's first breast cancer prevention centre, she organised a calendar of tasteful, naked photographs of different local people including members of Chesterfield FC.

In October 2006, a book detailing her life, decision and operation was published called No Big Deal by Peak FM Newsreader Simon Towers on Boltneck Publishings; a song bearing the same title was also released in February 2007 by Ovacast featuring Becky on vocals. It has reached #67 on the UK Singles Chart.

Measures was for a time a volunteer dog walker for the Chesterfield & North Derbyshire Branch of the RSPCA, and was a guest judge at their Fun Dog Show on 17 June 2007.

In 2017, after having two children, Measures opted to have a hysterectomy as a preventative measure against womb-related cancers.
