= Lizzie Ball =

British musician and concert producer

- Born: 18 February 1981 (age 44); Hathersage, United Kingdom
- Occupation(s): Violinist, vocalist, producer
- Website: http://www.lizzieball.com

Lizzie Ball is a British musician, concert producer, violinist, vocalist, and advisor and educator on various musical and theatrical projects. Her career has seen her work with artists including Jeff Beck, Brian Wilson, Judith Owen, Bryan Ferry, the New York Polyphony, and Ronnie Scott's James Pearson Trio.

In November 2018, Ball's debut curated show "Corrido: A Ballad For The Brave" premiered at the Victoria and Albert Museum as part of their Frida Kahlo exhibition.

== Early career ==
Ball was born in Hathersage, Derbyshire, and attended Lady Manners School in Bakewell in the Peak District. Raised in a musical family, her father was a jazz pianist. At the age of seven, Ball heard a violin being played on the radio and decided that it was the instrument she wanted to play.

Ball became leader of the City of Sheffield Youth Orchestra, before gaining a place at St John's College, Cambridge to read Music. Whilst studying at Cambridge, Ball became principal of the Cambridge University Chamber Orchestra, and was an Instrumental Scholar.

After graduating from Cambridge University, Ball went on to undertake postgraduate studies at the Royal College of Music and the Guildhall School of Music, where she studied under violinists Yossi Zivoni and David Takeno.

== Professional career ==
Ball's professional music career has seen her work with a wide variety of classical and contemporary musicians. Her desire to present classical music to a wider audience has led to collaborations with the likes of Rod Stewart, Russell Watson, Kanye West, Adele, Kylie Minogue and Rob da Bank.

Fifteen years after first hearing him on stage, Ball met Nigel Kennedy at Ronnie Scott's Jazz Club in London. In 2010, Kennedy invited Ball to duet with him and become the concertmaster for the European tour of his Orchestra of Life, in which role Ball has performed at venues including the Royal Albert Hall, Symphony Hall Birmingham, Bridgewater Hall, Berlin Philharmonie and the Royal Festival Hall, together with Massive Attack’s Damon Reece and soul singer Carleen Anderson.

Ball's career has seen her collaborate with Jeff Beck, Brian Wilson, Judith Owen, Bryan Ferry and the New York Polyphony as a featured artist. She has also worked on numerous albums with artists including Rudimental and Paul Weller, and has been a part of film soundtracks including Terminator 3.

In November 2018, Ball collaborated with Lithuanian accordionist Martynas Levickis, performing as Orchestra Director and Soloist for a performance named Kings and Queens, Castles and Legends, an all-English programme to honour the fallen on Remembrance Day.

Ball later worked as orchestra leader on Ariana Grande at the BBC with British conductor and composer Steve Sidwell.

== Classical Kicks ==
In 2012, Ball set up Classical Kicks, a collective of classically trained musicians, based out of Ronnie Scott's Jazz Club. The collective have sold out every appearance at the jazz club since forming, and have gone on to appear at UK festivals including Bestival, collaborating with DJ Rob da Bank, and have performed at schools across the country.

== Tracks4Change ==
Ball is also co-founder of Tracks4Change, a songwriting competition in partnership with Bestival and charity Bite the Ballot. Tracks4Change is designed to entice young songwriters and composers into writing music inspired by their opinions of democracy, with the overall objective to support increasing awareness of the need for young people to register and use their right to vote. The competition is judged by DJ Rob da Bank, actress Maisie Williams and entrepreneur and founder of SB.TV, Jamal Edwards MBE.

== Corrido: A Ballad For The Brave ==
In 2018, Ball partnered with producer Emily Blacksell to create the show Corrido: A Ballad For The Brave, an audio-visual concert paying musical homage to artistic self-expression, amplifying female voices and honouring established heroines, including the life and works of Frida Kahlo. Ball and Blacksell curated the show together after Ball had returned to the United Kingdom after spending time in Mexico. Corrido premiered as a special event at the Victoria and Albert Museum as part of their Frida Kahlo exhibition on 2 November 2018, which is Day of the Dead in Mexico.

== Personal life ==
On 10 November 2018, Ball received an honorary master's degree from the University of Derby in recognition of her achievements in the field of music and her innovative and creative approach to classical music.

Ball is passionate about outreach projects, and has been working with the Sheffield Music Hub on various projects. She is also an ambassador for PRISMA, a charity founded by classical guitarist Morgan Szymanski providing art workshops for children in rural Mexico.

Ball has one older brother who resides in São Paulo, Brazil. Her mother resides in Derbyshire, United Kingdom.

== Discography ==
- You Held Me (2009)
- Hasta Siempre EP (2013)
- Hasta Siempre Otra Vez EP (2013)
