= Coleridge Collar =

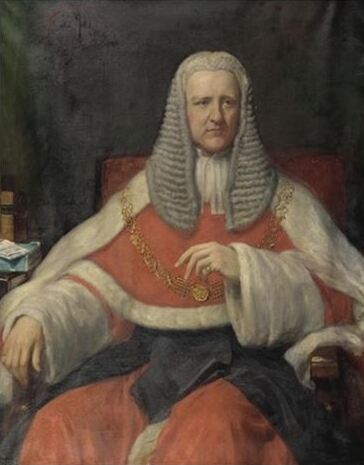
John Coleridge, 1st Baron Coleridge, wearing the Coleridge Collar.

The Coleridge Collar is a gold necklace whose provenance is disputed. It is said to be either a 16th-century chain of office, given by King Henry VIII to his adviser Sir Edward Montagu, on the latter's appointment as Lord Chief Justice of the Common Pleas in 1546; or a 17th-century copy.

A former owner, William Coleridge, 5th Baron Coleridge, was advised by Sotheby's that the collar was a 22-carat copy, and so sold it privately, in 2006, for £35,000.

However, on 6 November 2008 the purchaser resold it, as a 20-carat 16th-century original, for more than £300,000 via Sotheby's rival Christie's; the purchaser was Christopher Moran. By Christie's catalogue description, the Coleridge Collar is 'an extraordinary survival of English renaissance goldsmith-work and, on the basis of stylistic and scientific analyses, can be dated to between 1st April 1545 and October 1551, making it the only known, complete, surviving gold collar of office from the time of Henry VIII'.

In 2012, Lord Coleridge sued Sotheby's, at the High Court, London, for the difference. Lord Coleridge lost the case and had to pay some 90% of the costs, about £1 million.
