= John FitzJames =

Sir John Fitzjames (c. 1465/70 – c. 1542) was Lord Chief Justice of the King's Bench from 1526 until 1539.

Sir John was a nephew of Richard Fitzjames, Bishop of London during the Hunne case. Sir John had also been Recorder of Bristol, Attorney-General and Chief Baron of the Exchequer.

According to William Roper's Life of Sir Thomas More, when Lord Chancellor Thomas Audley was challenged by More as to the sufficiency of the indictment under which he was condemned at his trial for treason on July 1, 1535, the Chancellor (who, according to Roper, wished to avoid all the blame for More's condemnation being imputed to himself) consulted with Fitzjames, "who, like a wise man answered, 'My Lords all, by St. Julian,' (that was ever his oath) 'I must needs confess that if the act of parliament be not unlawful, then is the indictment in my conscience not insufficient,' whereupon the Lord Chancellor said to the rest of the Lords, 'Lo, my Lords, lo! you hear what my Lord Chief Justice saith,' and so immediately gave judgment against him."

Later in that same month, when the King's chief minister, Thomas Cromwell, wanted to halt the export of coin he decided to consult Fitzjames on whether a proclamation could be used for this. Cromwell asked him what the King could do if "there wer no law nor statute made alreadye for any suche purpose", to which Fitzjames replied that a proclamation was "of as good effecte as any law made by parlyament or otherwyse". Cromwell was "veray gladde to here" Fitzjames' answer.

When the Reformation Parliament was prorogued in 1536 Fitzjames was rewarded £40 by the King.

He married, after 1514, (as her second husband) Elizabeth, daughter of Sir Humphrey Coningsby, Knt., (c1450-1535) Judge of King's Bench, by his spouse Alice Ferriby. She died between November 1545 and May 1546.

== Notes ==
Legal offices
Preceded by John Ernley	Attorney General for England and Wales; 1518 – 1522	Succeeded by John Roper
Preceded by John Scot	Chief Baron of the Exchequer; 1522 – 1526	Succeeded by Sir Richard Broke
Preceded by John Fineux	Lord Chief Justice of the King's Bench; 1526 – 1539	Succeeded by Edward Montagu
