= Lewis Watson, 1st Baron Rockingham =

English landowner and politician

Lewis Watson
- Baron Rockingham
- Coat of arms
- Reign: Charles I
- Successor: Edward Watson, 2nd Baron Rockingham
- Other titles: Baronet of Rockingham Castle
- Born: Before 14 July 1584; Rockingham Castle
- Baptised: 14 July 1584; Rockingham church
- Died: 5 January 1653 (aged 68)
- Buried: 12 January 1653; Rockingham church
- Noble family: Watson
- Spouses: Catherine Bertie; Eleanor Manners
- Issue: with Eleanor: Edward Watson, 2nd Baron Rockingham; Grace Watson; Anne Watson; Frances Watson; Elizabeth Watson; Eleanor Watson
- Father: Sir Edward Watson
- Mother: Anne Digby
- Occupation: politician

Lewis Watson, 1st Baron Rockingham (before 14 July 1584 – 5 January 1653) was an English landowner and politician who sat in the House of Commons from 1621 to 1624. From 1621 to 1645 when he received his peerage he was known as Sir Lewis Watson, 1st Baronet. He supported the Royalist cause in the English Civil War and for his services was created Baron Rockingham in 1645.

== Life ==
Watson was the son of Sir Edward Watson (c. 1549 – 1617) of Rockingham Castle and Anne Digby, daughter of Kenelm Digby of Stoke Dry, Rutland. He was baptised at Rockingham on 14 July 1584. He matriculated at Magdalen College, Oxford, on 24 May 1599, but did not graduate. He was admitted to the Middle Temple as a student in 1601. On 19 August 1608, he was knighted at Grafton. He succeeded to Rockingham Castle, which was leased from the crown, on the death of his father on 1 March 1617 and later acquired the fee of the castle and its lands from the crown.

In 1621, Watson was elected Member of Parliament for Lincoln. He was created a baronet on 23 June 1621. In 1624 he was re-elected MP for Lincoln. He was Sheriff of Northamptonshire from 1632 to 1633. In 1633 he acquired from the Brocas family the title of "hereditary" Master of the Buckhounds which was a serjeanty associated with the Manor of Little Weldon. In 1638 he became verderer of Rockingham and Brigstock.

Watson served the King during the Civil War and as a result was created Baron Rockingham on 29 January 1645.

== Marriages and children ==
Watson married twice.

- Firstly, in 1609, Catherine Bertie (d. 15 February 1611), daughter of Peregrine Bertie, Baron Willoughby de Eresby and Mary de Vere. She died in childbirth on 15 February 1610, and was buried at Spilsby, Lincolnshire.
- Secondly on 3 October 1620, Eleanor Manners (d. 23 October 1679), daughter of Sir George Manners, of Haddon Hall, Derbyshire and Grace Pierrepont, daughter of Sir Henry Pierrepont. They had six children, a son and five daughters:

- Edward Watson, 2nd Baron Rockingham (30 June 1630 – 22 June 1689)
- Grace Watson (b. 1623) married Sir Edward Barkham of West Acre, Norfolk.
- Anne Watson (1625 – 1697)
- Frances Watson (b. 1626) married Edward Dingley of Worcestershire.
- Elizabeth Watson (1627 – 1658)
- Eleanor Watson (b. 1629) married Sir Charles Dymock of Scrivelsby, Lincolnshire.

== Gallery ==
Arms of Watson, of Rockingham Castle: Argent, on a chevron engrailed azure between three martlets sable as many crescents or

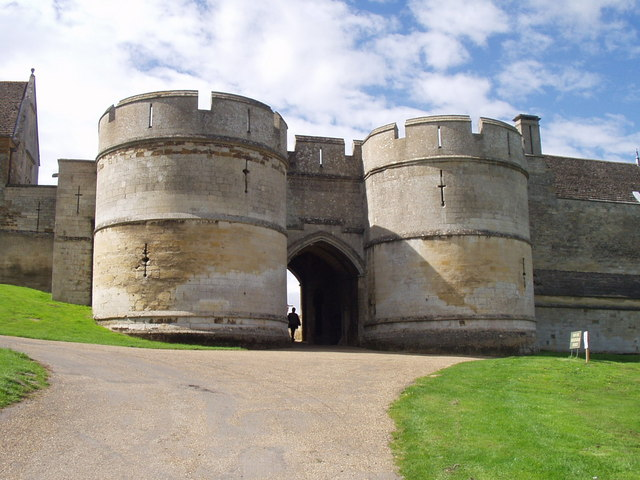
Rockingham Castle, Northamptonshire, seat of the Watson family

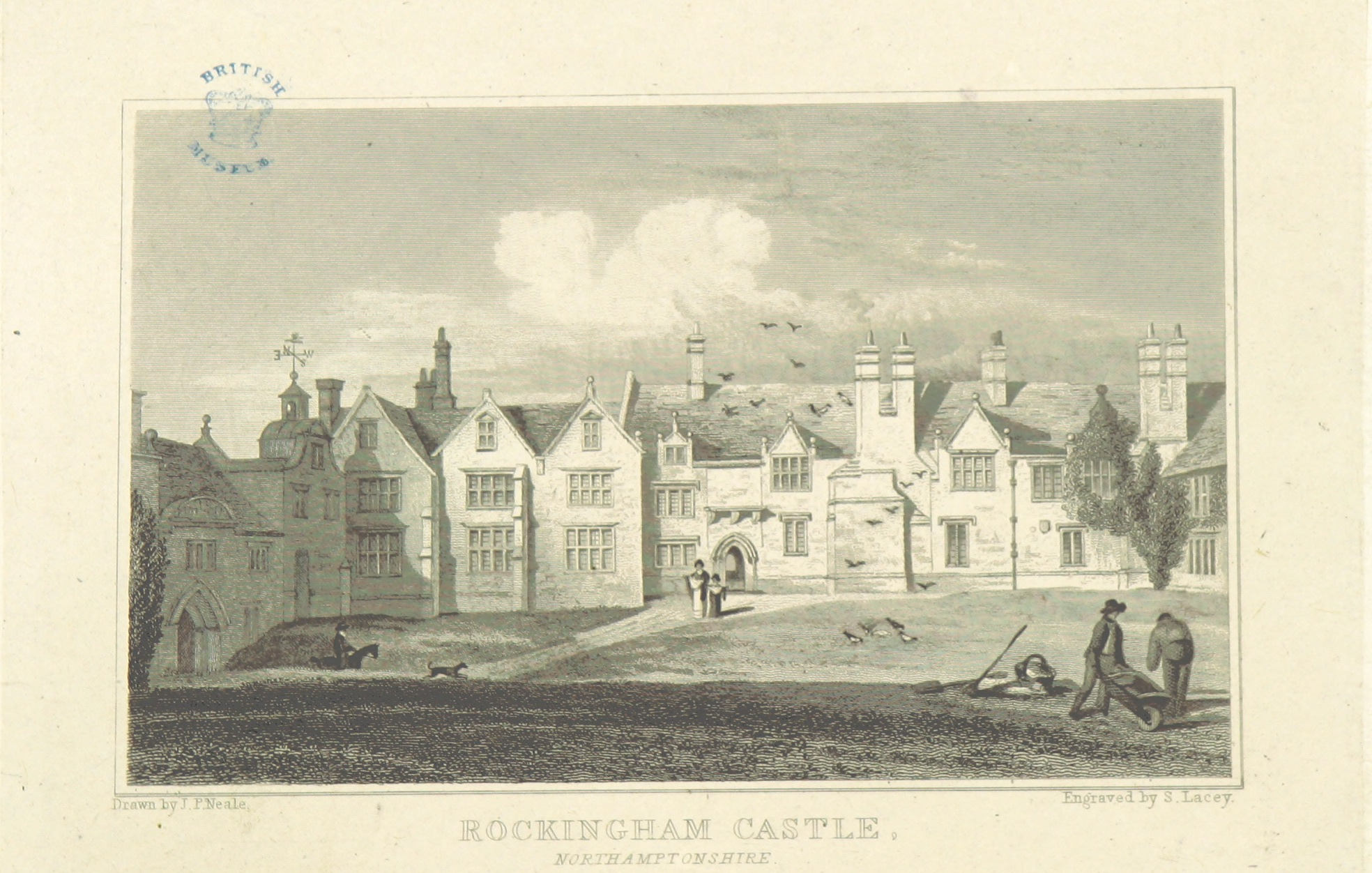
Rockingham Castle, Northamptonshire

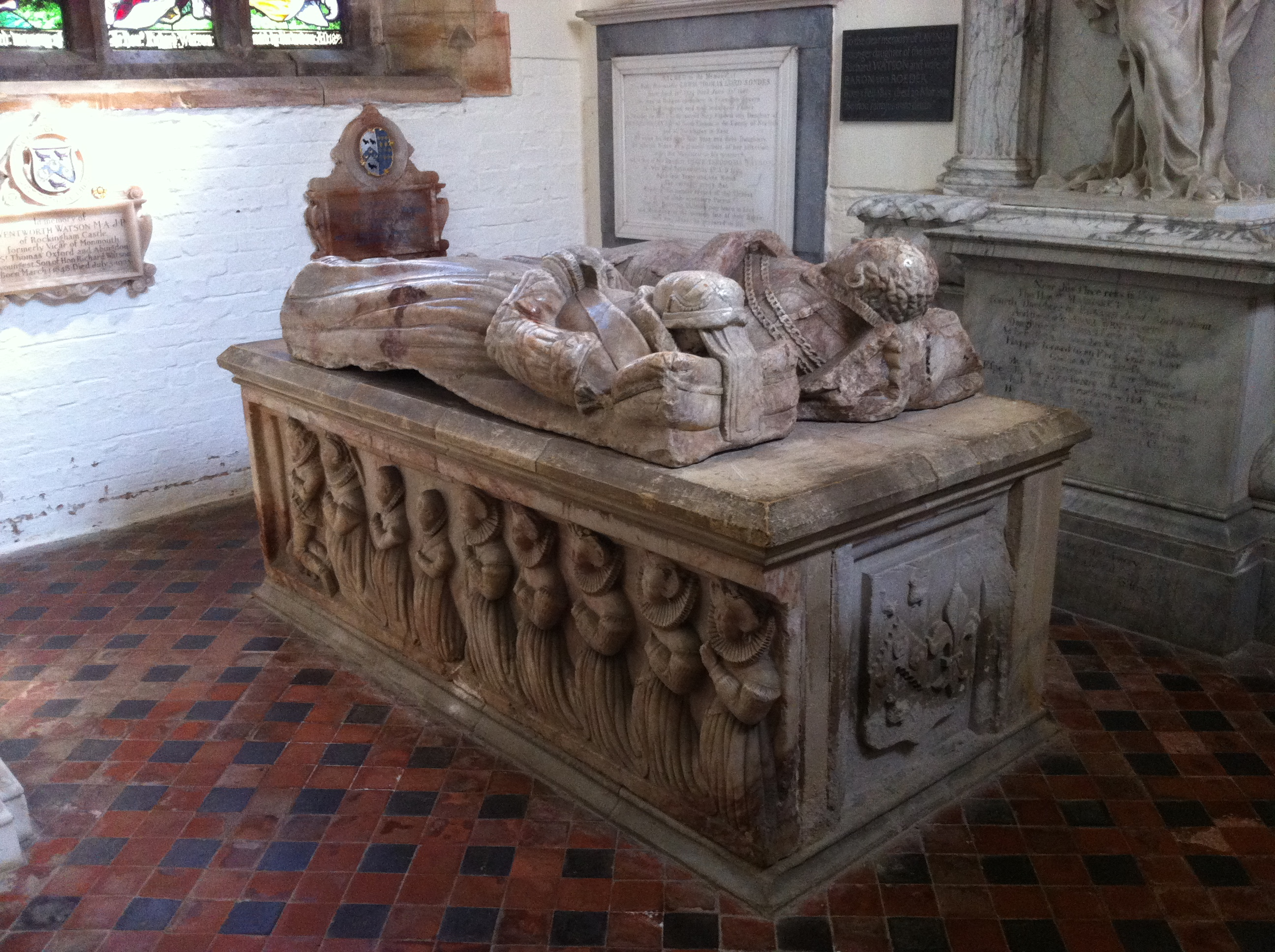
Memorial in St Leonard's Church, Rockingham, erected by Lewis Watson, 1st Baron Rockingham (1584-1653) after the Civil War

== Death ==
He died on 5 January 1653 and was buried in Rockingham church a week later. His widow died in London on 23 October 1679 and was buried with her husband at Rockingham on 8 November. He was succeeded by his son Edward.

== Sources ==
- Bennett, Martyn (23 September 2004). "Watson, Lewis, first Baron Rockingham (bap. 1584, d. 1653), landowner". Oxford Dictionary of National Biography (online ed.). Oxford University Press. doi:10.1093/ref:odnb/28853. (Subscription, Wikipedia Library access or UK public library membership required.)
- Cokayne, George Edward, ed. (1900). Complete Baronetage. Vol. 1: 1611–1625. Exeter: William Pollard & Co. OCLC 3986751.
- Metcalfe, Walter C., ed. (1887). The Visitations of Northamptonshire Made in 1564 and 1618-19, with Northamptonshire Pedigrees from Various Harleian MSS. London: Mitchell and Hughes. pp. 17, 37, 114–115. OCLC 807194019.
- Owen, David (1981). "Watson, Edward (c.1549-1617), of Rockingham, Northants". In Hasler, P. W. (ed.). The History of Parliament: the House of Commons 1558-1603 – via History of Parliament Online.
- Watson, Paula; Sgroi, Rosemary (2010). "Watson, Sir Lewis (1584-1653), of Rockingham Castle, Northants". In Thrush, Andrew; Ferris, John P. (eds.). The History of Parliament: the House of Commons 1604-1629 – via History of Parliament Online.
- Wise, Charles (1891). Rockingham Castle and the Watsons. London: Elliot Stock. OCLC 902976023.

Parliament of England
Preceded by Sir Thomas Grantham; Edward Bash	Member of Parliament for Lincoln; 1621–1624; With: Sir Edward Ayscough 1621–1622; Thomas Hatcher 1624	Succeeded by Sir Thomas Grantham; Sir John Monson
Peerage of England
New creation	Baron Rockingham; 1645–1653	Succeeded by Edward Watson
Baronetage of England
New creation	Baronet (of Rockingham Castle); 1621–1653	Succeeded by Edward Watson
