= Grace, Lady Manners =

English noblewoman (c.1575 – c.1650)

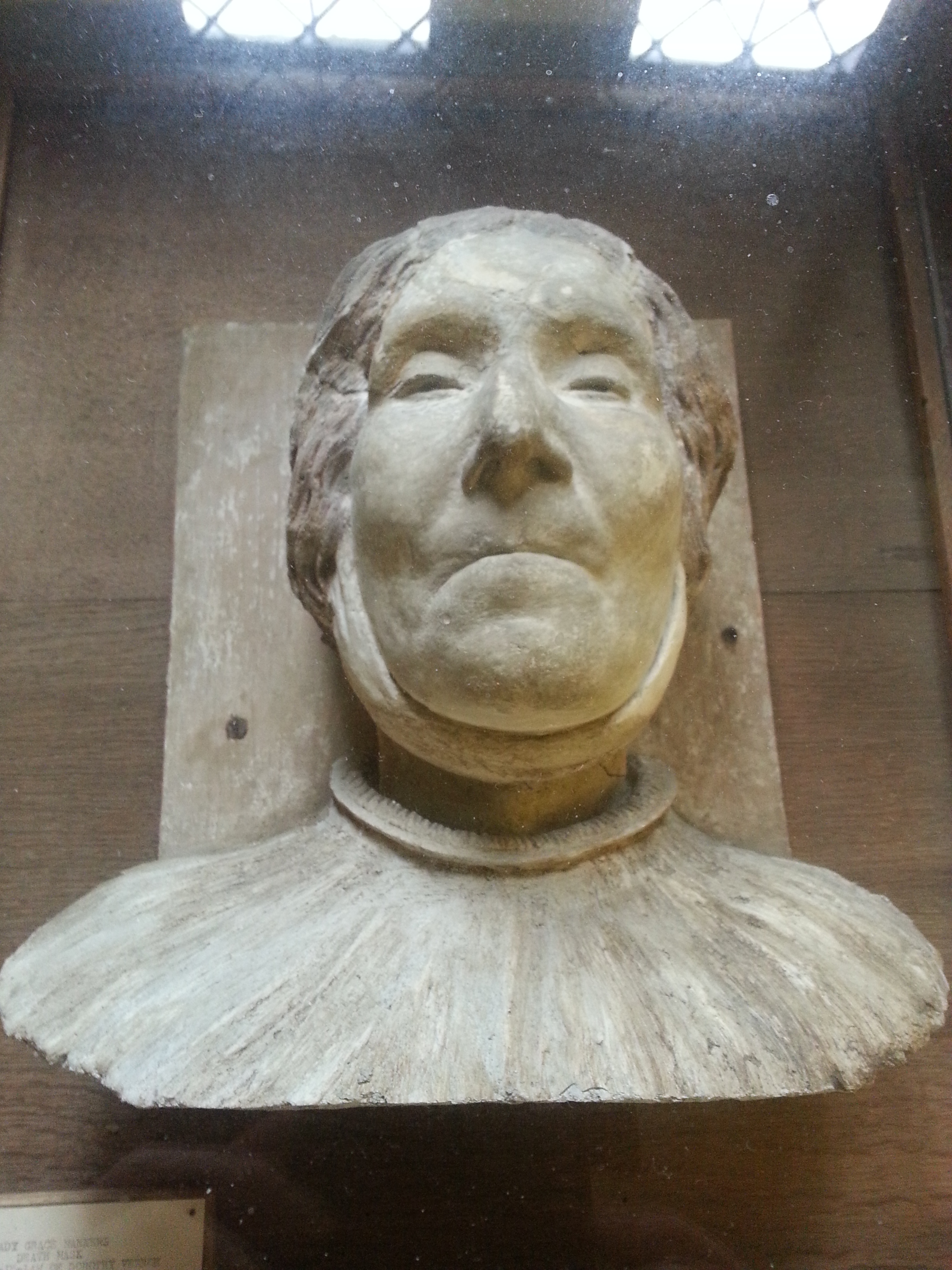
Lady Manners' death mask

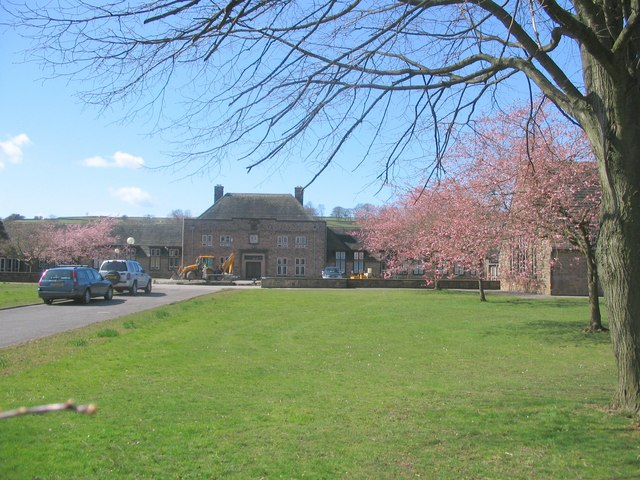
Lady Manners school

Grace, Lady Manners (c. 1575 – c. 1650) was an English noblewoman who lived at Haddon Hall near Bakewell, Derbyshire. She founded Bakewell's Lady Manners School in 1636.

== Biography ==
Grace Pierrepont was the daughter of Sir Henry Pierrepont, a Knight of the Garter, and Frances Cavendish. Her maternal grandparents were Sir William Cavendish and Bess of Hardwick. Grace's brother was Robert Pierrepont, born in 1584, who became the 1st Earl of Kingston-upon-Hull. Grace's sister, Elizabeth, was a member of the household of Mary, Queen of Scots, and later married Thomas Erskine, 1st Earl of Kellie.

On 1 August 1593, she married Sir George Manners (1569–1623) of Haddon Hall in Derbyshire, a Member of Parliament. According to the inscription in Bakewell Church, she had nine children, including:

- John Manners, 8th Earl of Rutland (1604–1679)
- Elizabeth Manners, who married Robert Sutton, 1st Baron Lexinton
- Eleanor Manners, who married Lewis Watson, 1st Baron Rockingham, and had children
- Frances Manners (died 1652), who married Nicholas Saunderson, 2nd Viscount Castleton, and had children
- Dorothy Manners, who married Sir Thomas Lake
- Mary Manners, who married Sackville Crowe

On 20 May 1636, she founded Lady Manners School in Bakewell, Derbyshire.

Her body is interred in Bakewell Parish Church.
