= George Manners (died 1623) =

English politician (1569–1623)

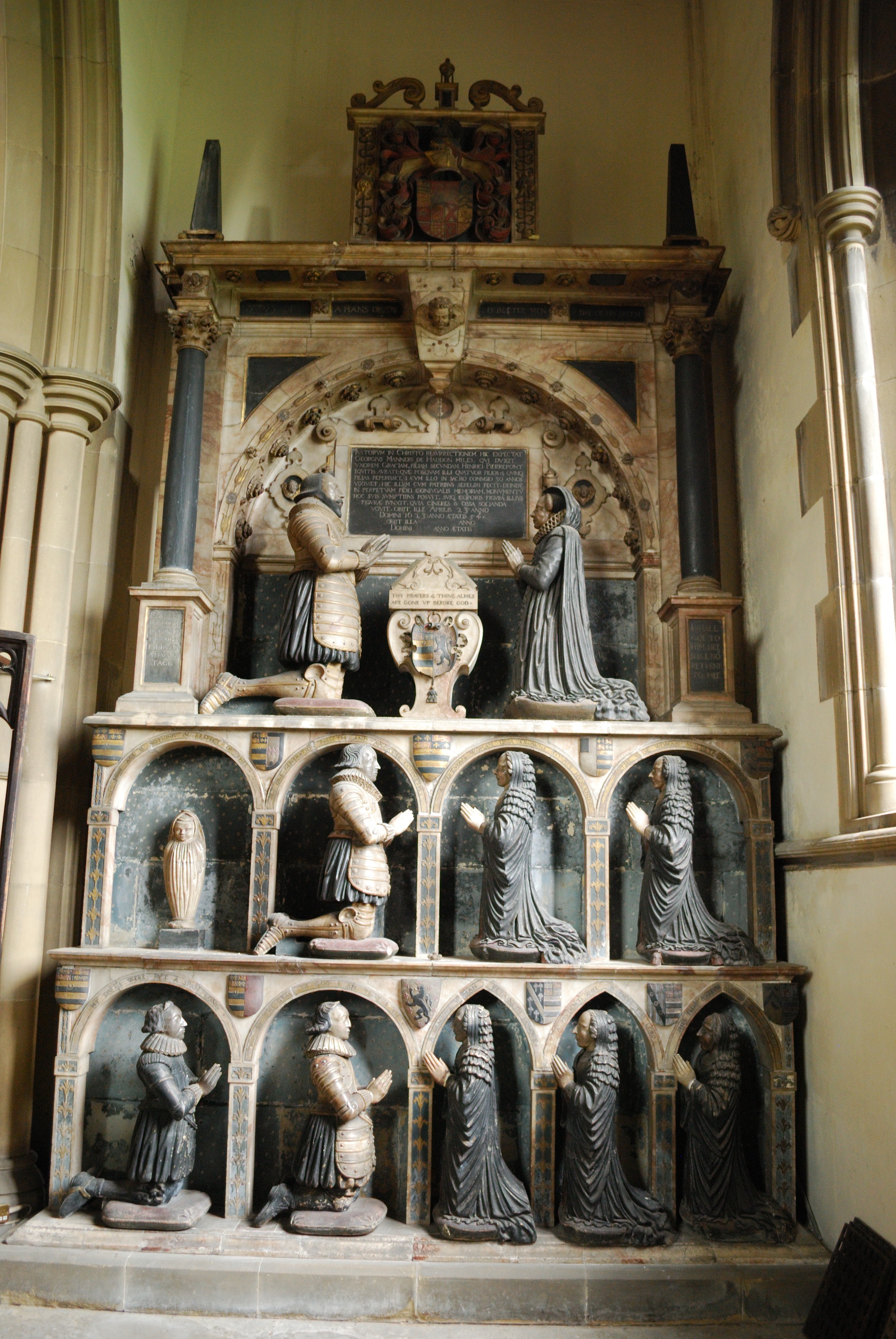
Monument to Sir George Manners, All Saints Church, Bakewell, Derbyshire

Arms of Manners: Or, two bars azure a chief quarterly azure and gules in the 1st and 4th quarters two fleurs-de-lis and in the 2nd and 3rd a lion passant guardant all or

Sir George Manners (1569–1623) of Haddon Hall in Derbyshire, England, served as a Member of Parliament for Nottingham, 1588–1589, and for Derbyshire, 1593–1596.

His elaborate triple-decked monument with kneeling effigies of himself and his wife and family survives in the Vernon/Haddon Chapel of All Saints Church in Bakewell, Derbyshire.

== Origins ==
He was the eldest son and heir of Sir John Manners (bef.1535–1611) (the second son of Thomas Manners, 1st Earl of Rutland of Belvoir Castle) of Shelford in Nottinghamshire and of Haddon Hall, Derbyshire, MP, and his wife Dorothy Vernon, a daughter and co-heiress of Sir George Vernon of Haddon Hall.

== Marriage and children ==
He married Grace Pierrepont, a daughter of Sir Henry Pierrepont, MP, of Holme Pierrepont, Nottinghamshire, by whom he had four sons and five daughters including:

- John Manners, 8th Earl of Rutland (1604–1679), eldest son and heir, who in 1641 inherited the earldom on the death of his second cousin George Manners, 7th Earl of Rutland. He married Frances Montagu, a daughter of Sir Edward Montagu, 1st Baron Montagu of Boughton.
- Elizabeth Manners, who married Robert Sutton, 1st Baron Lexinton.
- Eleanor Manners, who married Lewis Watson, 1st Baron Rockingham, and had issue.
- Frances Manners (died 1652), who married Nicholas Saunderson, 2nd Viscount Castleton, and had issue.
- Dorothy Manners, who married Sir Thomas Lake.
- Mary Manners, who married Sackville Crowe
