= Peak FM (North Derbyshire) =

Coordinates: 53.267446°N 1.439902°W

Chesterfield; England
- Broadcast area: North Derbyshire
- Frequency: FM: 102.0, 107.4 MHz
- RDS: PEAK FM

Programming
- Format: Adult contemporary

Ownership
- Owner: Bauer

History
- First air date: 7 October 1998
- Last air date: 31 August 2020
- Former names: Peak 107 (1998–2004)

Peak FM was an Independent Local Radio station serving north Derbyshire. The station was folded into Greatest Hits Radio Yorkshire, as part of a rebrand, on 1 September 2020.

== Coverage area ==
Peak FM's coverage area included the towns of Alfreton, Bakewell, Bolsover, Clay Cross, Dronfield, Matlock, Pinxton, Ripley, Shirebrook, South Normanton and Staveley. Southern districts of the City of Sheffield were also included, though the topography of the area made reception unreliable in certain parts.

=== Frequencies ===
- 107.4 FM covered Chesterfield, south Sheffield, north Alfreton, and north-eastern Derbyshire, from the Chesterfield transmitter at Unstone.
- 102.0 FM covered Matlock, Bakewell, the Derbyshire Dales and central Alfreton from the Stanton Moor transmitter.

Peak FM was also available as an audio stream on the internet.

== History ==
The station began broadcasting to Chesterfield as Peak 107 FM on 7 October 1998, at 08:00, with the Simple Minds song "Alive and Kicking". The Radio Authority had awarded Grand Central Broadcasting the licence earlier in the spring.

The station was launched by Dave Kilner, with the (then) Mayor and Mayoress of Chesterfield. Mark Burrows presented Breakfast after the launch, followed by Dave Kilner on mid-mornings, James Hilton on drive, Trev Parsons one hour of drive and the evening show and Richard Spinks on Late Night Love.

At the same time, the authority also awarded licences for two other small stations, in nearby Bassetlaw and Mansfield.

=== Forever Broadcasting ===
In 2001, Forever Broadcasting bought Grand Central Broadcasting and Peak 107 was rebranded with "The 50/50 Music Mix of Yesterday and Today", tagline, accompanying change in music policy.

Forever sold three of its stations in 2003: with three remaining- Peak, Tower FM in Bolton and Wolverhampton's 107.7 The Wolf. In early 2004, Forever Broadcasting was itself bought by The Wireless Group, run by former newspaper editor Kelvin MacKenzie.

=== Wireless Group and UTV Radio ===
Former Logo

Under the new regime, the station's name changed from 'Peak 107' to 'Peak FM' in Summer 2004. The station had always broadcast on two frequencies.

Station output did not change dramatically after the takeover, but presenters were occasionally required to promote other stations and services offered by The Wireless Group, which was itself taken over by UTV Radio in June 2005.

=== Bauer ===
On 8 February 2019, the Wireless Group's local radio stations (including Peak FM) were sold to Bauer.

The sale was ratified in March 2020, following an inquiry by the Competition and Markets Authority, and on 27 May 2020, Bauer announced Peak FM would become part of the Greatest Hits Radio network.

On 13 July 2020, local programming excluding breakfast was replaced by networked output from GHR, resulting in redundancies among most of the presentation team.

In September 2020, Peak FM ended its local breakfast show and closed its Chesterfield studios as it completed rebranding to Greatest Hits Radio. The station was folded into Greatest Hits Radio Yorkshire, which until November 2024 provided a regional afternoon show from Bauer's Leeds studios. Thereafter all programmes were networked, primarily from London or Manchester. However, localised news bulletins, traffic updates and advertising have been retained.
