= Rockingham Castle =

Grade I listed historic house museum in Rockingham, Northamptonshire, United Kingdom

Coordinates: 52.5129°N 0.724°W

- Part of Northamptonshire
- Corby, England
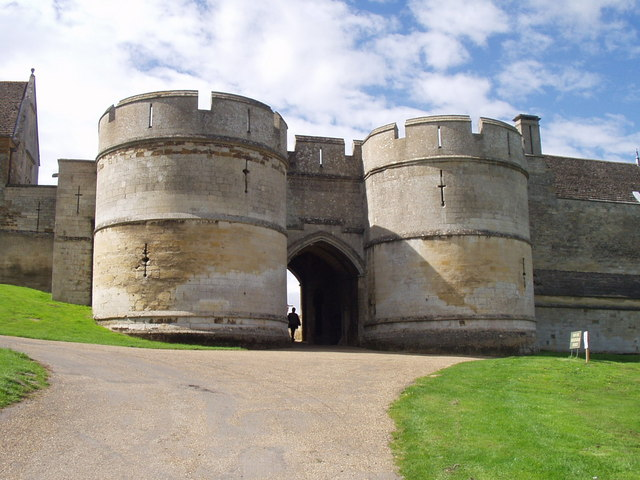
- The main gateway at Rockingham Castle

Site information
- Type: Enclosure castle
- Owner: Saunders Watson family
- Condition: Renovated

Location
- Height: 10 metres (33 ft)

Site history
- Built: 11th century
- In use: Private
- Materials: Limestone; Sandstone
- Events: English Civil War

Rockingham Castle is a former royal castle and hunting lodge in Rockingham Forest, approximately two miles from the town centre of Corby, Northamptonshire, England.

== History ==
=== 11th – 14th centuries ===
The site on which the castle stands was used in the Iron Age, in the Roman period, by the Saxons, Normans, Tudors and also in the medieval period. This is because its position on elevated ground provides clear views of the Welland Valley from a strong defensible location.

William the Conqueror ordered the construction of a wooden Motte-and-bailey at Rockingham in the 11th century shortly after the Norman conquest of England. Within three decades, William II replaced it with a stone castle. A stone keep was added to the large motte and the outer bailey was enclosed by a curtain wall. The castle was then used as a royal retreat throughout the Norman and Plantagenet periods. Nearby Rockingham Forest was especially good for hunting wild boar and deer.

A church/state council was held at the castle in 1095 to address the issue of episcopal appointments. It was attended by William II and Anselm, Archbishop of Canterbury, but failed to reach a resolution.

In 1270 Henry III strengthened the castle with the addition of a twin D-tower gatehouse. But less than a century later Edward III became the last monarch to visit the castle while it was possessed by the Crown.

=== 15th – 21st centuries ===
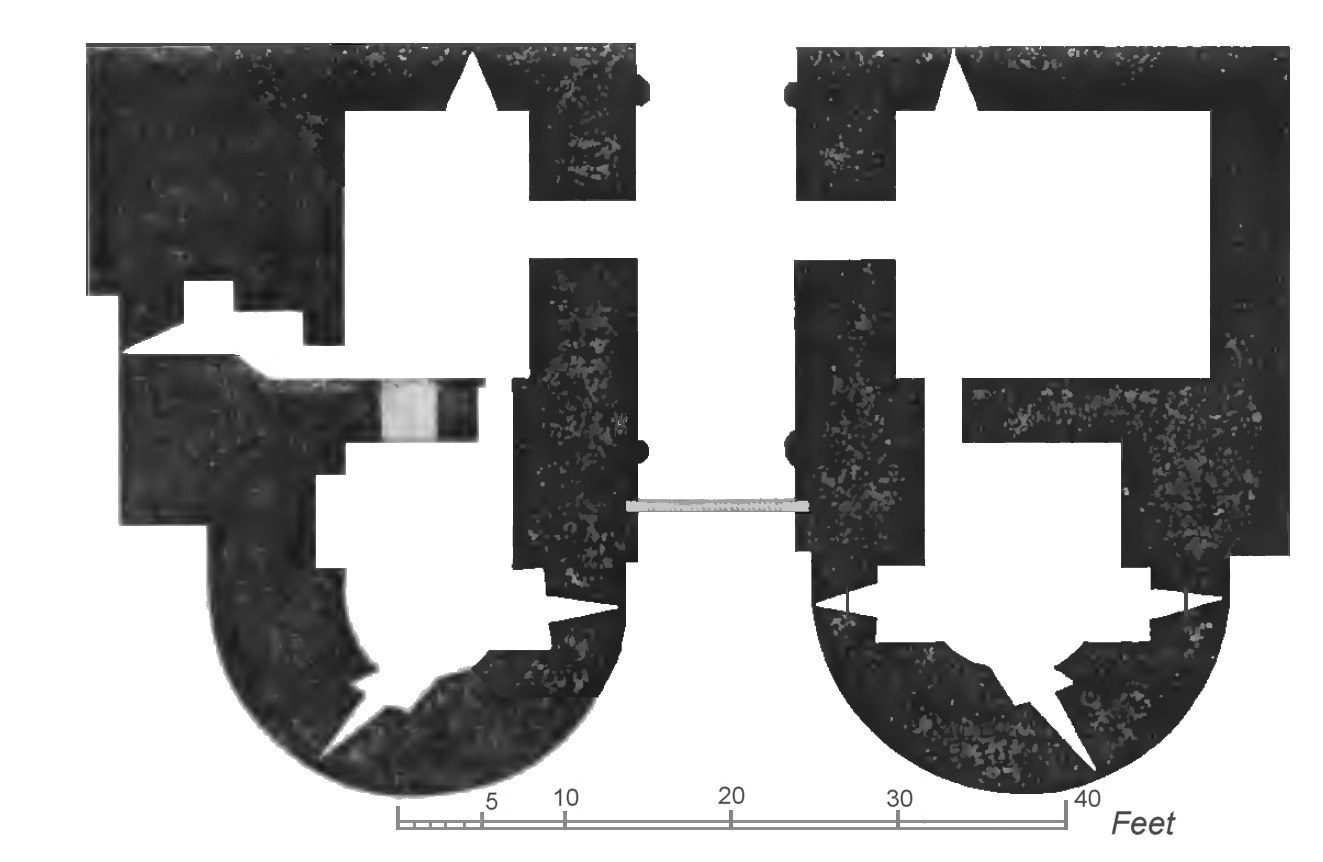
A plan of the gatehouse

By the late 15th century Rockingham Castle had fallen into disrepair. Sir Edward Watson, founder of the Watson dynasty, acquired the lease of the castle from Henry VIII. Parts of the castle were later replaced with a Tudor house with gardens. The former royal castle became a hunting lodge for the nobility. Watson's grandson Lewis Watson acquired the freehold of the castle and lands from the Crown. Watson was successively a knight, baronet and baron.

In the 1640s, during the English Civil War, Rockingham was garrisoned by royalist troops. They fought several small skirmishes with Parliamentary forces. In 1643 Rockingham was captured by Parliamentarian general Henry Grey, 1st Earl of Stamford and Lewis Watson was temporarily forced to leave. Its remaining walls were slighted in 1646. In the latter 17th and 18th centuries, Rockingham returned to being a civil residence.

Lewis' grandson, also Lewis, already Baron Rockingham, was created Earl of Rockingham and Viscount Sondes in 1714. He had inherited Lees Court, in 1709 on the death without issue of his brother in law Louis De Duras 2nd Earl of Ferversham, The earldom was extinguished with the death of the 5th baron (3rd earl) in 1746. While the Barony of Rockingham passed to another cousin, Thomas Watson-Wentworth, who was created Marquess of Rockingham later that year, The Rockingham estate along with Lees Court, Sheldwich then passed to his cousin Lewis Monson, who changed his name to Watson and later became in 1760 Baron Sondes of Lees Court. Lees Court was a modern house having been rebuilt in the mid 16th Century by George Sondes 1st Earl of Feversham and it became the principal family seat, meaning that Rockingham Castle remained unaltered during this period. Both estates descended via the 2nd and 3rd Barons Sondes, until the later's death. He was Lewis Richard Watson who died unmarried in 1836. At this point the estates of Rockingham Castle and Lees Court diverged, Lees Court remained with the Baron Sondes line and passed to Lewis Richard's brother George John Watson 4th Baron Sondes, However, from the 3rd Baron Sondes, Rockingham Castle passed firstly to his younger brother The Rev. Henry Watson and then another brother Richard Watson. The castle was inherited by successively by the sons of Richard Watson, George Lewis Watson (d.1899) and Rev Wentworth Watson, on whose death in 1925 the estate passed to his great nephew Sir Michael Culme-Seymour, 5th Baronet in 1925. He lived here with his wife, Lady Mary Faith Montagu, a daughter of the 9th Earl of Sandwich, until 1967, when he transferred it to his nephew, Commander Michael Saunders Watson CBE, chairman of the British Library.

Today the mainstay of the castle is the home of the Saunders-Watson family led by James Saunders Watson, the son of Michael Saunders, who achieved £4,000,000 in revenue from its events and rentals in 2017. He served as High Sheriff of Northamptonshire for 2018/19. He was appointed Lord-lieutenant of Northamptonshire in 2020 and currently holds the title.

== Description ==
The castle has a strong gatehouse, which is to be expected for castles of its time. There are two large semicircular towers, protruding from the castle wall, located on either side of the gate. These are also known as D-towers. This gatehouse is on the east side of the structure, facing almost entirely towards the field. The plan of the castle is a typical rectangular shape, with a passage through the center of the structure. This passage is entered through a porch beneath a drop arch, and was guarded by a portcullis in front of a wooden door. Another door is located at the end of the passage. Along the sides of the passage are openings, leading to rectangular chambers. In the east walls of these were the doorways two the semicircular chambers of the towers. The gatehouse and its towers have only two floors. This design is reminiscent of the rectangular stone gatehouse of the early Norman castle. The remainder of the castle is contained by stone walls. Within this castle are many halls, units of housing, and other buildings.

== Location ==
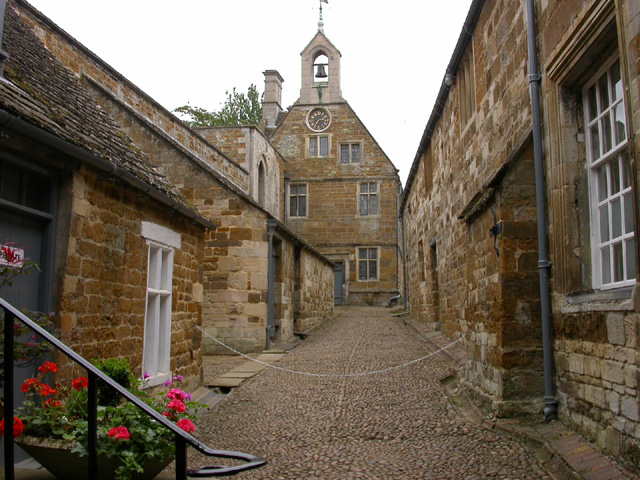
Inside Rockingham Castle

The parish borders directly onto the town of Corby. Rockingham (and Corby) are part of North Northamptonshire, part of the ceremonial county of Northamptonshire.

The castle overlooks the villages of Rockingham and Caldecott, and has views over the Welland Valley. Privately owned, it is open to the public for events and on certain days.

The place was visited by writer Charles Dickens, who was a friend of Richard and Lavinia Watson, ancestors of the current family. The castle is arguably the inspiration for Chesney Wold in Dickens' novel Bleak House, published in 1853.

The castle takes its name from the manor of Rockingham, which was the only manor of the parish which in turn had markedly few churchlands, especially as is common after the dissolution of the monasteries. Rockingham Forest was, largely outside of the parish, named after the place during the time of William the Conqueror because of the castle's importance as a royal retreat.

A cricket pitch lies within the grounds and is home to Old Eastonians Cricket Club.

== Filming ==
Rockingham Castle was used as a principal setting for the BBC English Civil War period drama By the Sword Divided. In the TV series, "Arnescote Castle" was the home of the Royalist Lacey family. The castle also featured in the film Top Secret!, which starred Val Kilmer.

== See also ==
- Castles in Great Britain and Ireland
- List of castles in England
