= David Brooke-Taylor =

English cricketer

Personal information
- Full name: David Charles Brooke-Taylor
- Born: 15 June 1920; Bakewell, Derbyshire, England
- Died: 17 July 2000 (aged 80); Tremadog, Gwynedd, Wales
- Batting: Right-handed
- Relatives: Geoffrey Brooke-Taylor (uncle)

Domestic team information
- Years: Team
- 1947–1949: Derbyshire
- FC debut: 19 July 1947 Derbyshire v Nottinghamshire
- Last FC: 27 August 1949 Derbyshire v Essex

Career statistics
Competition	First-class
Matches	15
Runs scored	375
Batting average	15.00
100s/50s	0/1
Top score	61*
Catches/stumpings	6/–
- Source: CricketArchive, October 2011

David Charles Brooke-Taylor (15 June 1920 – 17 July 2000) was an English cricketer who played first-class cricket for Derbyshire from 1947 to 1949.

Brooke-Taylor was born at Bakewell, Derbyshire. He was educated at Cheltenham College. He started playing for Derbyshire in the second XI and for the Club and Ground in 1938, and continued doing so in 1939. After the war he played similar games but made his first-class debut for Derbyshire against Nottinghamshire in July 1947 as captain. He was standing in for Edward Gothard according to the Derbyshire tradition that the captain be an amateur. He scored 1 in the first innings and 38 in the second. He played two more first-class matches that season, captaining one of them against Surrey and making his top score of 61 not out against Northamptonshire. In 1948 he played regularly in the County squad and in miscellaneous matches. In 1949 he played for the second XI in the Minor Counties Championship and in two final first-class matches in August 1949.

Brooke Taylor was a right-hand batsman and played 26 innings in 15 first-class matches at an average of 15.00 with a top score of 61 not out.

Brooke-Taylor died at Tremadog, Gwynedd at the age of 80. His uncle Geoffrey Brooke-Taylor had also played for Derbyshire.
