= A619 road =

A-road in Derbyshire and Nottinghamshire, England

Coordinates: 53.2161°N 1.6734°W

A619

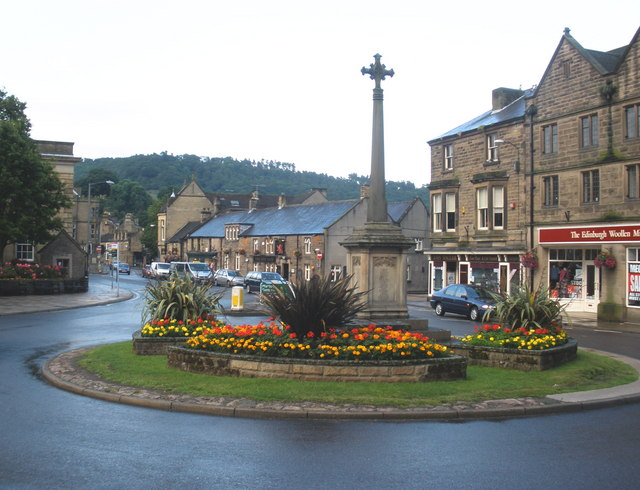
- The start of the A6135 at Bakewell

Major junctions
- A632; A61 A616

Location
- Country: United Kingdom
- Constituent country: England

Road network
- Roads in the United Kingdom; Motorways; A and B road zones
← A617	→ A6120

The A619 is an A road that links Bakewell, Derbyshire to Worksop, Nottinghamshire in England.

== Route ==
The route begins in Bakewell at Rutland Square, where it crosses the Bakewell Bridge over the River Wye, heading north towards Baslow. The road then heads east through Wadshelf before reaching Chesterfield. The road passes through the centre of the city, and briefly merges with the A61 before heading west as Rother Way and Chesterfield Road as it passes through Brimington, Hollingwood and Staveley. The road becomes Worksop Road, where it passes over the M1 into Barlborough. The road continues east through Whitwell Common where it terminates in Worksop.
