= Richard Watson (cricketer) =

English cricketer

Personal information
- Full name: Richard Martin Watson
- Born: 31 December 1921; Bakewell, Derbyshire, England
- Died: 1 October 1987 (aged 65); Penrhosgarnedd, Wales
- Batting: Left-handed
- Bowling: Leg-break

Domestic team information
- Years: Team
- 1947: Derbyshire
- FC debut: 17 May 1947 Derbyshire v Woecestershire
- Last FC: 16 July 1947 Derbyshire v South Africans

Career statistics
Competition	First-class
Matches	6
Runs scored	68
Batting average	8.50
100s/50s	0/0
Top score	25*
Catches/stumpings	3/–
- Source: Cricketarchive, January 2012

Richard Martin Watson (31 December 1921 – 1 October 1987) was an English cricketer who played first-class cricket for Derbyshire in 1947.

Watson was born at Bakewell, Derbyshire. He was educated at Denstone College where he was in the cricket team from 1936 to 1939. He made his debut for Derbyshire in the 1947 season against Worcestershire in May when he was not out for 12 and took two catches. He played five more first-class games that season and also played in the Derbyshire second XI in 1947 and 1948. His best score of 25 not out was against the South Africans.

Watson was a left-hand batsman who played eleven innings in six first-class matches with an average of 8.50 and a top score of 25 not out. He was a leg-break bowler, but did not bowl in a first-class game.

Watson died at Penrhosgarnedd, Bangor, Wales at the age of 65.
