= Jonty Hearnden =

English antiques expert and television presenter

- Born: Jonathan Philip Hearnden; 1960 (age 65–66); Brentwood, Essex, England, UK
- Occupations: Antiques expert and television personality
- Years active: 1979–present

Jonty Hernden, born Jonathan Philip Hearnden in 1960 in Brentwood, Essex) is an English antiques expert and television presenter. Though born in Brentwood, his parents owned a toy shop and a gentlemen's outfitters in Shenfield until shortly after his birth, he was later raised in Dorchester-on-Thames in Oxfordshire.

== Education ==
Hearnden was educated at Shiplake College, an independent school in Shiplake, near Henley-on-Thames in Oxfordshire. He was diagnosed with dyslexia at an early age.

== Career ==
Hearnden began working with Bonhams Auctioneers London in 1979 as a furniture cataloguer. His further career included management of Lots Road Galleries, an auction room in London. In 1990 he started as an antiques dealer through his business, Dorchester Antiques, in Dorchester-on-Thames, Oxfordshire.

== Television appearances ==
As of 2009, Hearnden has appeared on the following TV shows (all BBC):

- Antiques Roadshow
- 20th Century Road Show
- Going for a Song
- Cash in the Attic
- Sun, Sea and Bargain Spotting
- Put Your Money Where Your Mouth Is
- Through the Keyhole

== Publications ==
- 2004 - Miller's Buyer's Guide: Late Georgian to Edwardian Furniture
- 2007 - Miller's What's In Your Attic?: Discover Antique and Collectable Treasures in Your Home
