= Geoffrey Brooke-Taylor =

English cricketer

Personal information
- Full name: Geoffrey Parker Brooke-Taylor
- Born: 25 October 1895; Bakewell, Derbyshire, England
- Died: 12 January 1968 (aged 72); Buenos Aires, Argentina
- Batting: Left-handed
- Role: Occasional wicket-keeper
- Relatives: David Brooke-Taylor (nephew)

Domestic team information
- Years: Team
- 1919–1920: Cambridge University
- 1920: Derbyshire
- FC debut: 21 May 1919 Cambridge Univ. v Australian Imperial Forces
- Last FC: 29 March 1930 Argentina v Sir J Cahn's XI

Career statistics
Competition	First-class
Matches	25
Runs scored	778
Batting average	19.94
100s/50s	0/5
Top score	84
Catches/stumpings	13/3
- Source: CricketArchive, November 2011

Geoffrey Parker Brooke-Taylor MC (25 October 1895 – 13 January 1968) was an English cricketer who played first-class cricket for Cambridge University in 1919 and 1920, for Derbyshire in 1920 and for Marylebone Cricket Club (MCC) in 1928.

Brooke-Taylor was born at Bakewell Hall, Bakewell, Derbyshire. He was educated at Cheltenham College where he was cricket captain in his last year. On 6 October 1914 he joined the 4th North Midland (Howitzer) Brigade of the Royal Field Artillery as a Second Lieutenant. and served with them in World War I. In January 1918 he was awarded the Military Cross "for conspicuous gallantry and devotion to duty when under heavy and continuous shell fire for five hours with his battery. During the shelling a dump of charges caught fire, and he, with others, succeeded in removing a large pile of neighbouring shell which was all the time in imminent danger of explosion. His prompt action and gallantry saved a large amount of ammunition and material and probably many lives."

After the war, Brooke-Taylor attended Cambridge University There he played nineteen matches for Cambridge University in 1919 and 1920. In the Varsity match in 1919 he scored 55 in the second innings, helping Gilbert Ashton to put on 74 for the fifth wicket before he was run out. However Oxford won that year, and the match the following year was a draw. He made his top score for Cambridge in 1920 against Sussex. He also appeared in one match for Derbyshire in the 1920 season against Somerset and made 30 and 14. By 1926 he was in Argentina where he played two matches against MCC that winter. Back in England in 1928 he played for MCC against Derbyshire, and in 1930 had returned to Argentina where he played two matches against Julien Cahn's XI.

Brooke-Taylor was a left-hand batsman and played 40 innings in 25 first-class matches with an average of 19.94 and a top score of 84. He was an occasional wicket-keeper.

Brooke-Taylor died at Hurlingham, Buenos Aires, Argentina at the age of 72. His nephew David Brooke-Taylor also played for Derbyshire.
