= Bakewell Bridge =

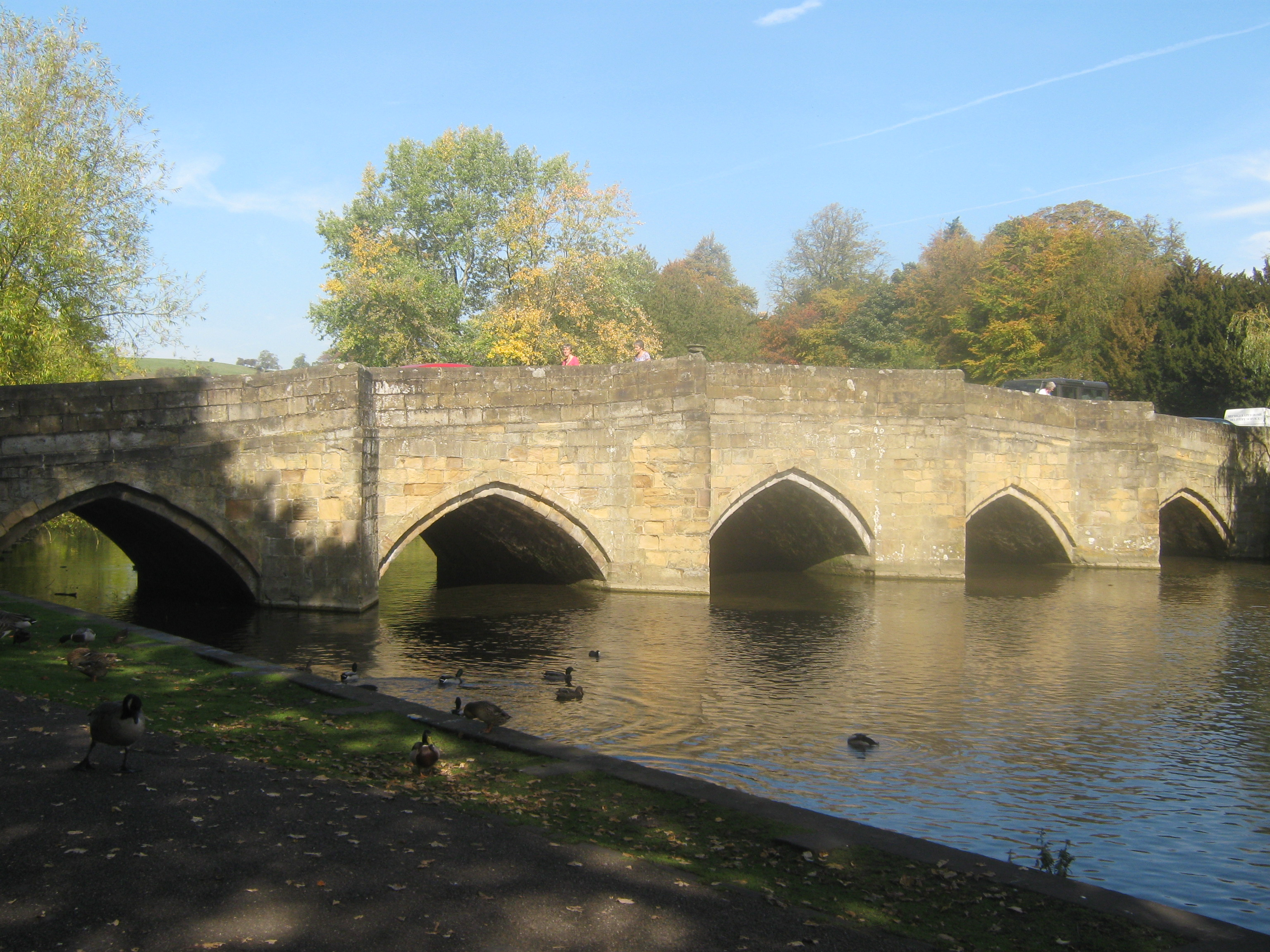
- Coordinates: 53.2144°N 1.6728°W
- Carries: A619 Bridge Street (Bakewell–Worksop)
- Crosses: River Wye
- Locale: Bakewell, Derbyshire

Characteristics
- Design: stone arch bridge

History
- Opened: c.1300
- Rebuilt: widened in 19th century

Statistics

Listed Building – Grade I
- Official name: Bakewell Bridge
- Designated: 13 March 1951
- Reference no.: 1148112

Scheduled monument
- Official name: Bakewell Bridge
- Reference no.: 1007078

Bakewell Bridge is a Grade I listed stone arch bridge spanning the River Wye in Bakewell, Derbyshire. The bridge is also a scheduled monument.

== History ==
The bridge dates back to the 14th century and was constructed using ashlar gritstone. The bridge has five arches with cutwaters, one of which supports the base of a cross, and was widened in the 19th century. It carries the A619 road, which begins in Bakewell and leads via Chesterfield to Worksop in Nottinghamshire.

== See also ==
- Grade I listed buildings in Derbyshire
- Listed buildings in Bakewell
