= Bakewell Castle =

Castle in Bakewell, Derbyshire, England

Coordinates: 53.21580°N 1.67051°W

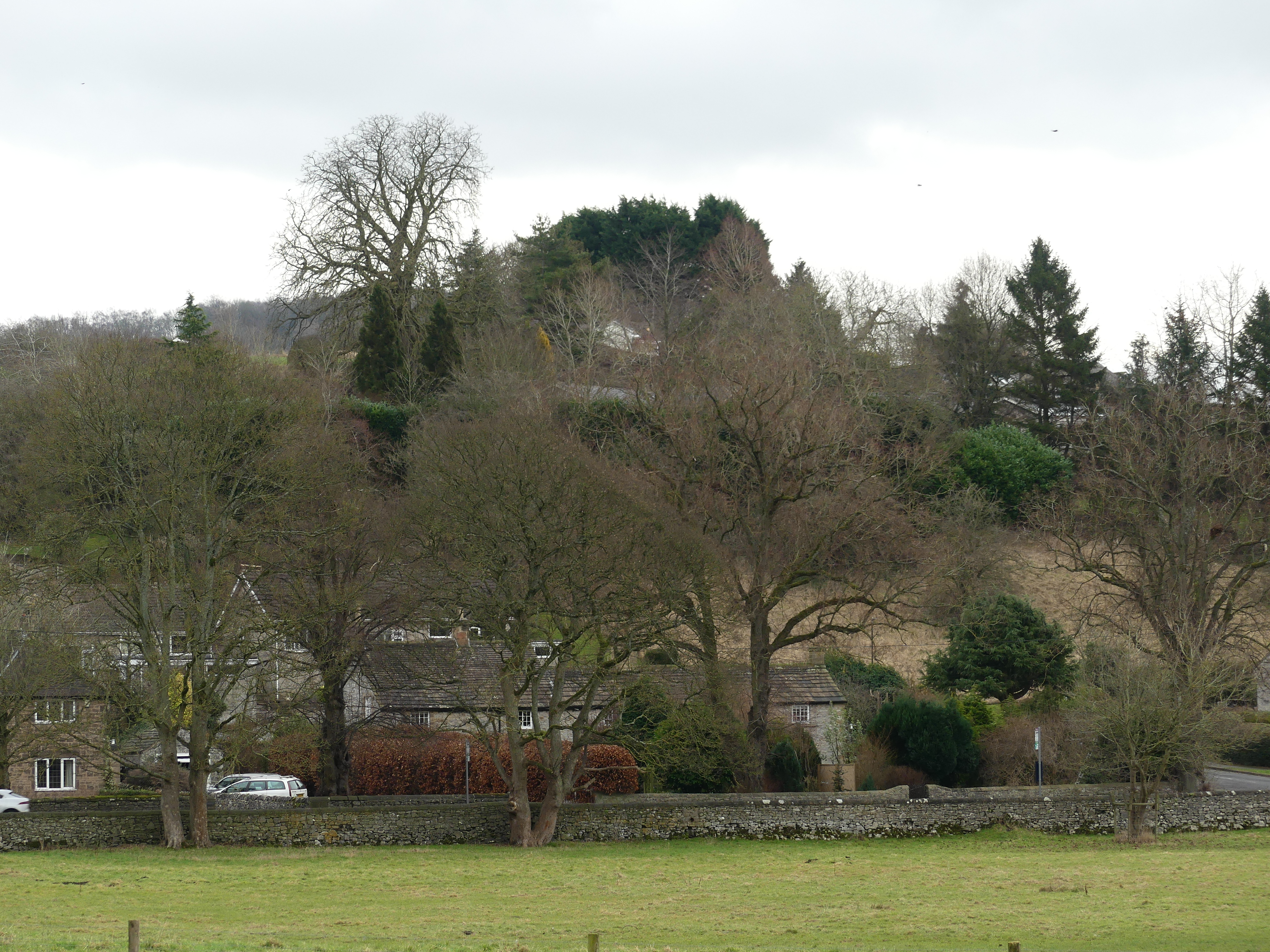
Site of Bakewell Castle: scheduled monument in Derbyshire

Bakewell Castle was in the town of Bakewell, Derbyshire (grid reference SK221688).

It was a motte and bailey castle. According to some sources it was built in the year 924 by Edward the Elder, who also established the main burh. The purpose of its erection appears to have been as a measure against the Mercian invasion. According to the Anglo-Saxon Chronicle, Edward marched into peakland after he had fortified Nottinghamshire, and from there onward he arrived at Bakewell, and commanded that a town with a garrison be established at this location. According to other sources the castle was built in the 12th century, most probably by Ralf Gernon. According to these sources, the building that existed before the 12th century at this location was not a fortification, but a simple manor, which was awarded to Gernon by Richard I during the 12th century, and Gernon fortified the manor. This hypothesis is based on the views of M.J. Swanton, formed after their 1969 and 1971 excavations of the location which showed that the remains of pottery found in the south-eastern side of the bailey were most probably from the 12th or 13th century. Some recent sources have suggested that both theories could be correct: that the castle is a 12th-century motte built upon a Saxon burh.

The castle was razed to the ground during the English Civil War. Today the only ruins that remain are certain earthworks, atop a mound that has been named as Castle Hill. The motte, which at one time may have been further fortified with a timber palisade, and its two baileys are visible, but none of the buildings remain except some foundation walls, which are now covered with vegetation; otherwise, only the earthworks remain. It is a Scheduled Ancient Monument.
