= Bakewell tart =

English shortcrust pastry

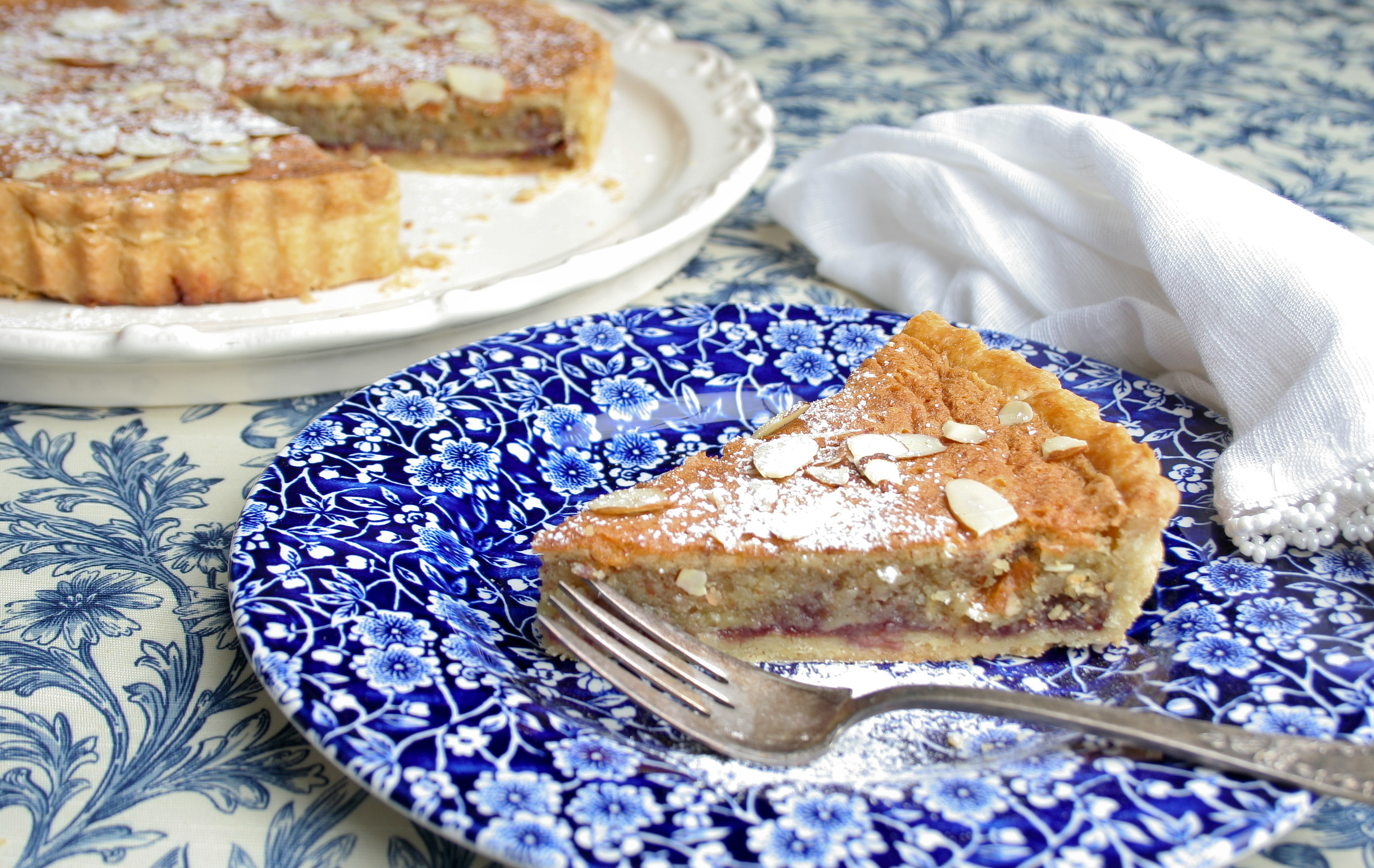
- A slice of Bakewell tart
- Course: Dessert
- Place of origin: England
- Region or state: Derbyshire
- Serving temperature: Warm (freshly baked) or cold
- Main ingredients: Ground almond, jam, shortcrust pastry, frangipane
- Variations: Gloucester tart

The Bakewell tart is a traditional English cake originating in the town of Bakewell, in the Derbyshire Dales district of Derbyshire. It consists of a shortcrust pastry shell filled with layers of raspberry jam and frangipane—a sweet sponge cake made with almond flour—topped with flaked almonds.

This dessert is a variant of the earlier Bakewell pudding.

== History ==
The Bakewell tart evolved from the Bakewell pudding in the early 20th century. The Bakewell pudding itself is believed to have been created accidentally in the 19th century at the White Horse Inn. According to one account, the landlady, Mrs. Greaves, instructed her cook to prepare a jam tart, but the cook mistakenly spread the almond paste mixture on top of the jam rather than mixing it into the pastry, resulting in a new dessert.

Over time, the Bakewell tart emerged as a distinct variation, featuring a shortcrust pastry base and a filling of jam and frangipane, topped with flaked almonds. The exact timeline of this evolution is debated, with some sources suggesting it occurred around 1820, while others propose as late as 1860. The first printed recipe for the Bakewell Pudding appeared in Eliza Acton's 1845 cookbook, Modern Cookery for Private Families.

== The Bakewell Tart Shop ==
The Bakewell Tart Shop is a long-standing family-owned business in the heart of Bakewell, and it has been producing Bakewell tarts for over 100 years. The shop was the first to sell Bakewell Tarts commercially and is widely recognised for preserving the traditional recipe, which is known only to two people.

The original Bakewell tart recipe is distinctive in its use of a "wet mixture" in the frangipane, passed down through generations, which results in a moister and more flavourful tart compared to other versions.

== See also ==
- List of almond dishes
- List of pastries
- List of pies, tarts and flans
