= Lumford Mill =

- Location in Derbyshire

Spinning watermill
- Location: Bakewell, Derbyshire, England
- Client: Richard Arkwright
- Further ownership: Duke of Devonshire (1860); Dujardin-Plante Company (1898)
- Coordinates: 53.2180°N 1.6836°W

Construction
- Built: 1777
- Employees: 350

Water Power
- Wheels: Undershot 1777; Twin Breastshot 1827 1852; Turbines ?1925?

Lumford Mill was a historic cotton mill at Bakewell in Derbyshire, England.

In 1777, Richard Arkwright leased a stretch of land by the River Wye from Philip Gell of Hopton. He installed his son as manager but there were problems with water rights. Upstream from the mill, they were owned by the Duke of Devonshire and downstream by the Duke of Rutland, both of whom were hostile to industrial development in the area as would later be the case with the railway.

But in any case Arkwright had not sought to gain permission, constructing dams and ponds, extracting sand, gravel and soil from land on the Rutland estate, altering the course of the river, and interfering with the Duke of Devonshire's fishing. This resulted in court cases in which Arkwright admitted trespass and paid compensation and a rent of £10 a year. From then on the mill prospered.

It was one of the few that Arkwright's son retained when he sold most of his cotton ventures and moved into banking.

There were difficulties in recruiting locally, so girls were brought in from Manchester. It was sold in 1860 to the Duke of Devonshire, but it burned down and was rebuilt in around 1890. At its peak it employed some 350 people. In 1898 the mill was taken over by the Dujardin-Plante Company who manufactured electric storage batteries.

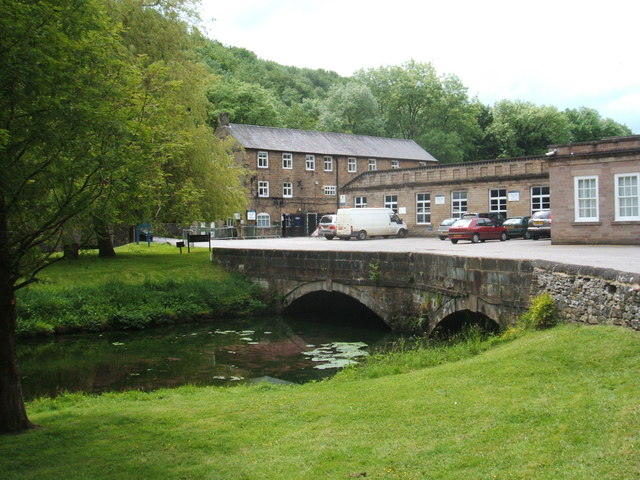
Lumford Mill

Throughout this time it continued to use water power with two high breast-shot wheels which had been installed in 1827 and 1852, replacing the original undershot wheel. After a hundred years of almost continuous working, a gear segment of the older wheel broke and jammed, to be replaced by water turbines.

Lumford Mill still stands today, under the name of Riverside Business Park Ltd. Proudly continuing its industrial lineage, the site is one of the largest industrial estates within the National Park, and is home to around 40 local businesses, some of which still work out of the old mill buildings. A number of the original mill workers cottages are also still inhabited at the site.
