= Shiplake College =

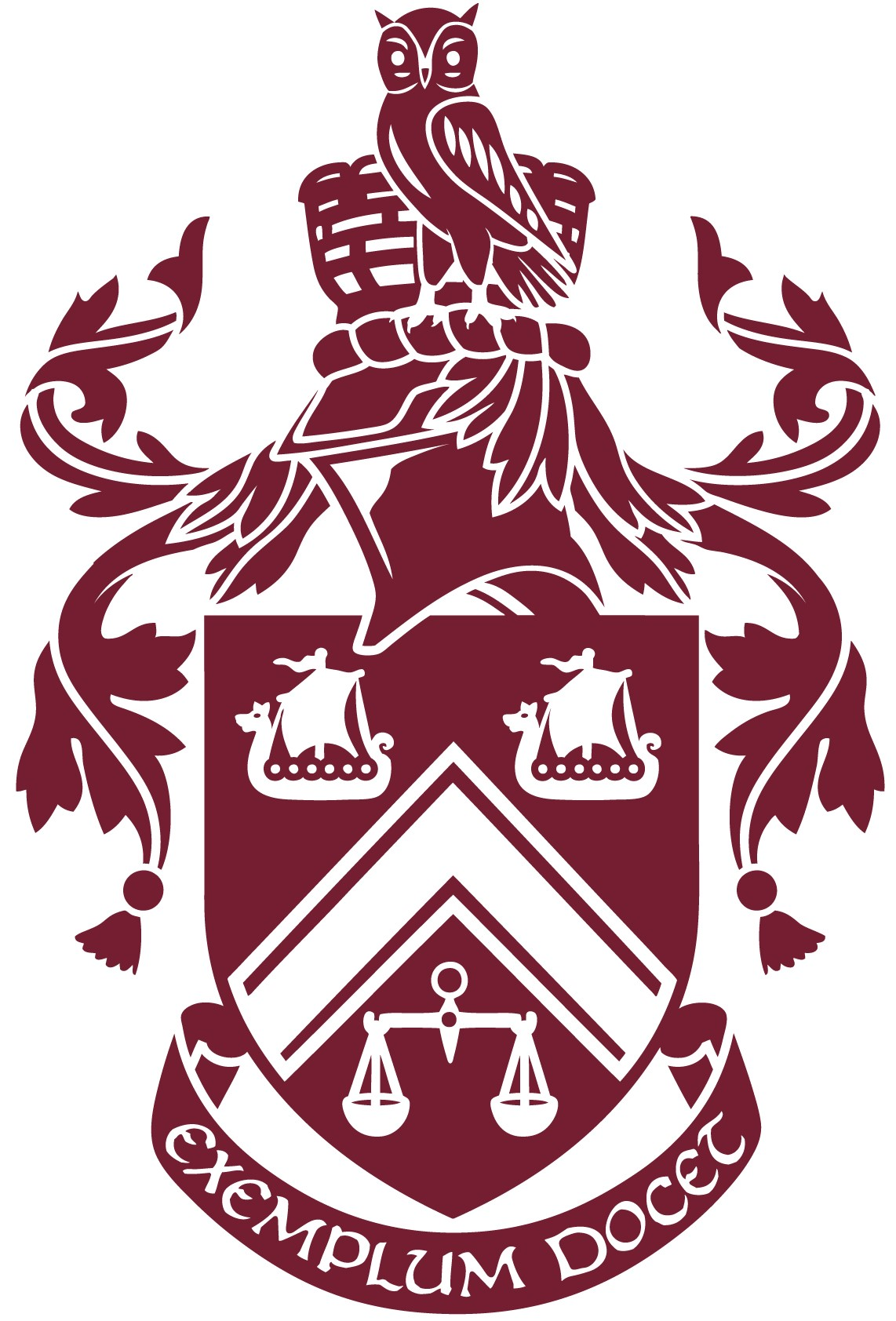

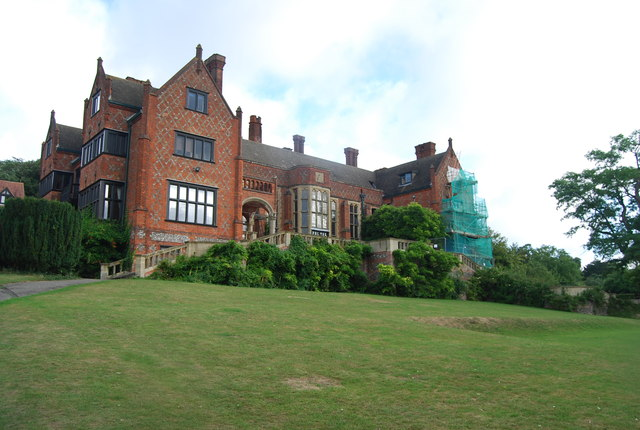

Location
- Shiplake Court; Henley-on-Thames, Oxfordshire, RG9 4BW; England; 51.498056°N 0.894167°W

Information
- Type: Private day and boarding
- Motto: Latin: Exemplum Docet ("The Example Teaches")
- Religious affiliation: Church of England
- Established: 1959
- Founder: Alexander Everett
- Local authority: Oxfordshire
- Department for Education URN: 123285 Tables
- Chairman of Governors: Sir David Tanner
- Headmaster: Tyrone Howe
- Gender: Co-educational
- Age: 11 to 18
- Houses: 8
- Colours: Black, Maroon and Gold
- Campus: 45 acres
- Athletics: 17 sports
- Former pupils: Old Vikings
- Publications: The Viking Voice
- Website: www.shiplake.org.uk

Shiplake College is a private boarding and day school in Shiplake, by the River Thames, just outside Henley-on-Thames, England. The school, with 580 pupils, takes girls and boys from 11–18. Originally boys-only, a co-educational Sixth Form was formed in 1998 and in 2023 girls started joining in Year 7, as the school became fully co-educational.

== History ==
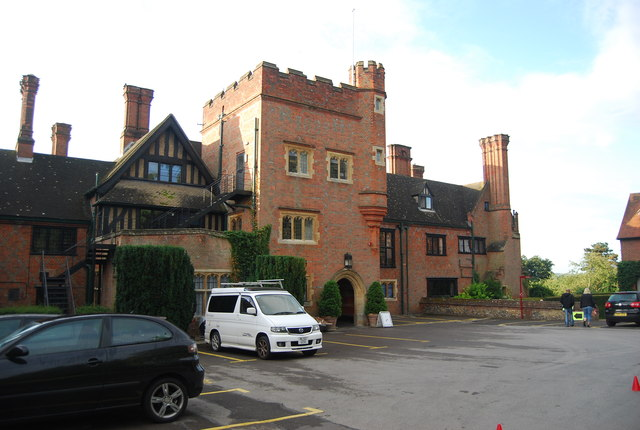
Shiplake College

Shiplake College was founded in 1959 by Alexander and Eunice Everett. The land on which the school now stands was bought by Robert Harrison in 1888 and the original buildings date from 1890. The main building, which houses Skipwith House and the Great Hall, was built as a private residence for the Harrison family. The house was sold in 1925 and was at first a private home to Edward Goulding, 1st Baron Wargrave, and then a prep school, before being sold to the BBC in 1941. Initially the BBC used Shiplake Court as a storage facility until in 1943 the BBC Monitoring Service moved to Caversham and the house became a hostel for BBC staff. The BBC closed the hostel in 1953 and the house remained largely unused until the arrival of the Everetts in 1958.

The College now stands in 45 acres of land on the banks of the Thames. In late 1958 the Everetts purchased Shiplake Court with the intention of founding a school, which duly opened as Shiplake Court on 1 May 1959. In 1963 John Eggar, a Derbyshire cricketer who had been a housemaster at Repton School, became headmaster and in 1964 renamed the school Shiplake College. By the time he retired in 1979, numbers had increased to 300.

== Sport ==
=== Rowing ===
Rowing is a school sport, and the College is on the banks of the River Thames. Girls and boys from the Shiplake College Boat Club have won medals at the Henley Royal Regatta, National Schools' Regatta, Schools' Head of the River Race and Henley Women's Regatta.

Former pupil Will Satch won an Olympic Gold medal at Rio 2016 in the Men's Eight, and an Olympic Bronze medal at London 2012 in the Men's Pair event.

=== Rugby ===
As well as rowing, the College plays rugby. For many years, Shiplake took part in a rugby event called "Friday Night Lights" hosted by local rugby clubs.

=== Outdoor Education ===
The school's island, The Lynch, along with mainland provisions, offers adventure and outdoor education experiences such as rafting, camping, and forest school.

== Headmasters ==
The following have served as headmasters of the school:

- Alexander Everett (1959)
- David Skipwith (1960–1962)
- John Eggar (1963–1979)
- Peter Lapping (1979–1988)
- Nick Bevan (1988–2004)
- Gregg Davies (2004–2019)
- Tyrone Howe (2019–present)

== Notable former pupils ==
- Tom Chilton, touring car driver
- Chris Cracknell, rugby player, head coach Fiji 7's team at 2016 Summer Olympics
- Dhani Harrison, George Harrison's son, musician
- Jonty Hearnden, antiques expert on Antiques Roadshow and Cash in the Attic
- Tom Howe, rugby union player; met his wife while a pupil at the College.
- Ben Hunt-Davis Gold Olympian rower in the Sydney 2000 Summer Olympics in the men's VIII.
- Nick Jones, Soho House proprietor
- Kia Joorabchian, businessman
- Nicholas Medforth-Mills, Romanian Prince
- Alex Pettyfer, actor
- Chris Standring, jazz musician
- Will Satch, Gold medallist in the Rio 2016 Olympic Games (Rowing Men's Eight); Bronze medallist in the London 2012 Olympic Games (Rowing Men's Pair)
- Alan Pownall, singer-songwriter
