= Bakewell pudding =

English pastry

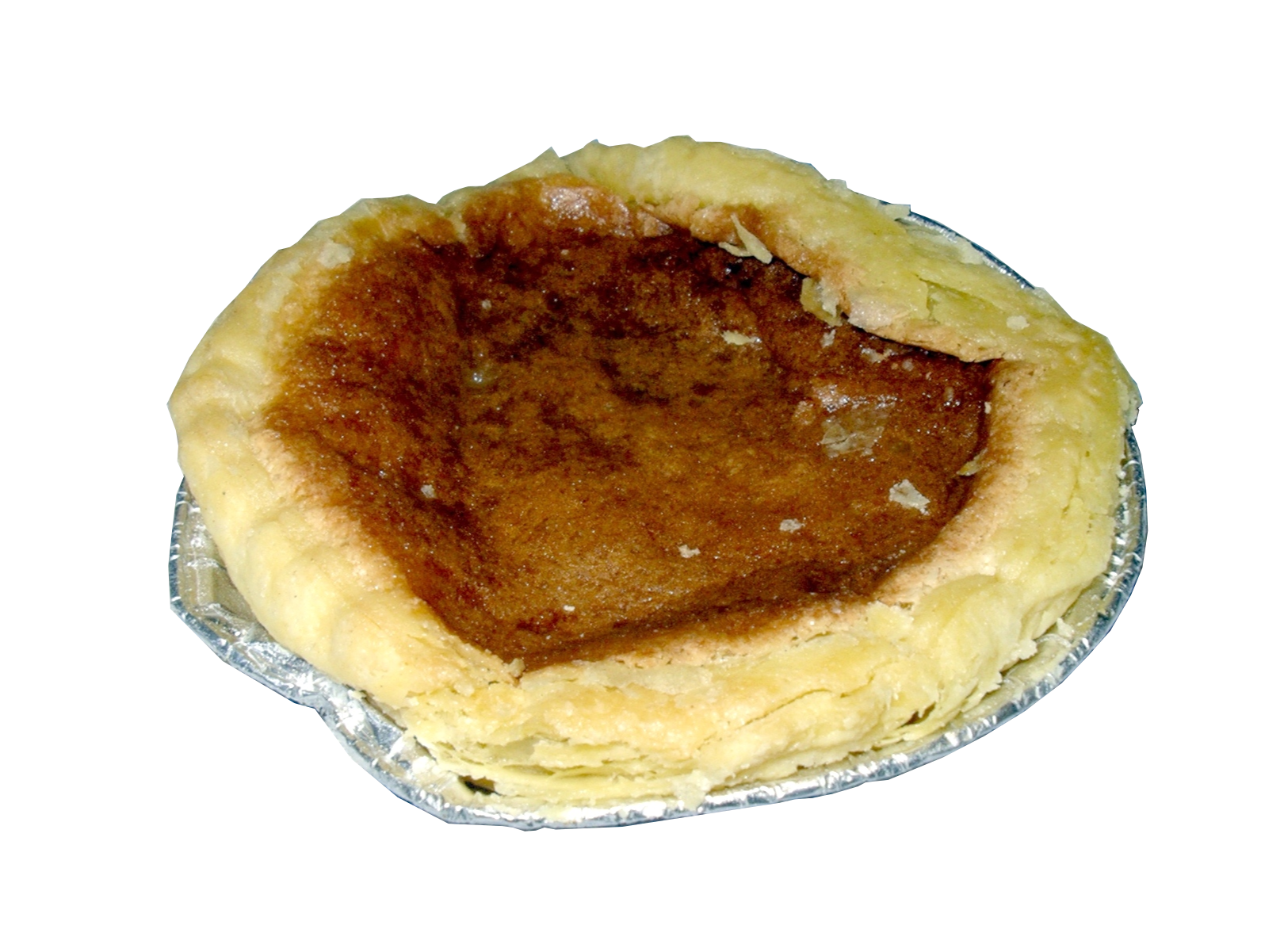
- A Bakewell pudding
- Course: Dessert
- Place of origin: England
- Region or state: Derbyshire Dales
- Serving temperature: Warm (freshly baked) or cold
- Main ingredients: Ground almond, jam, butter, eggs
- Variations: Bakewell tart

Bakewell pudding is an English dessert consisting of a flaky pastry base with a layer of sieved jam topped with a filling made of egg and almond paste.

== Name ==
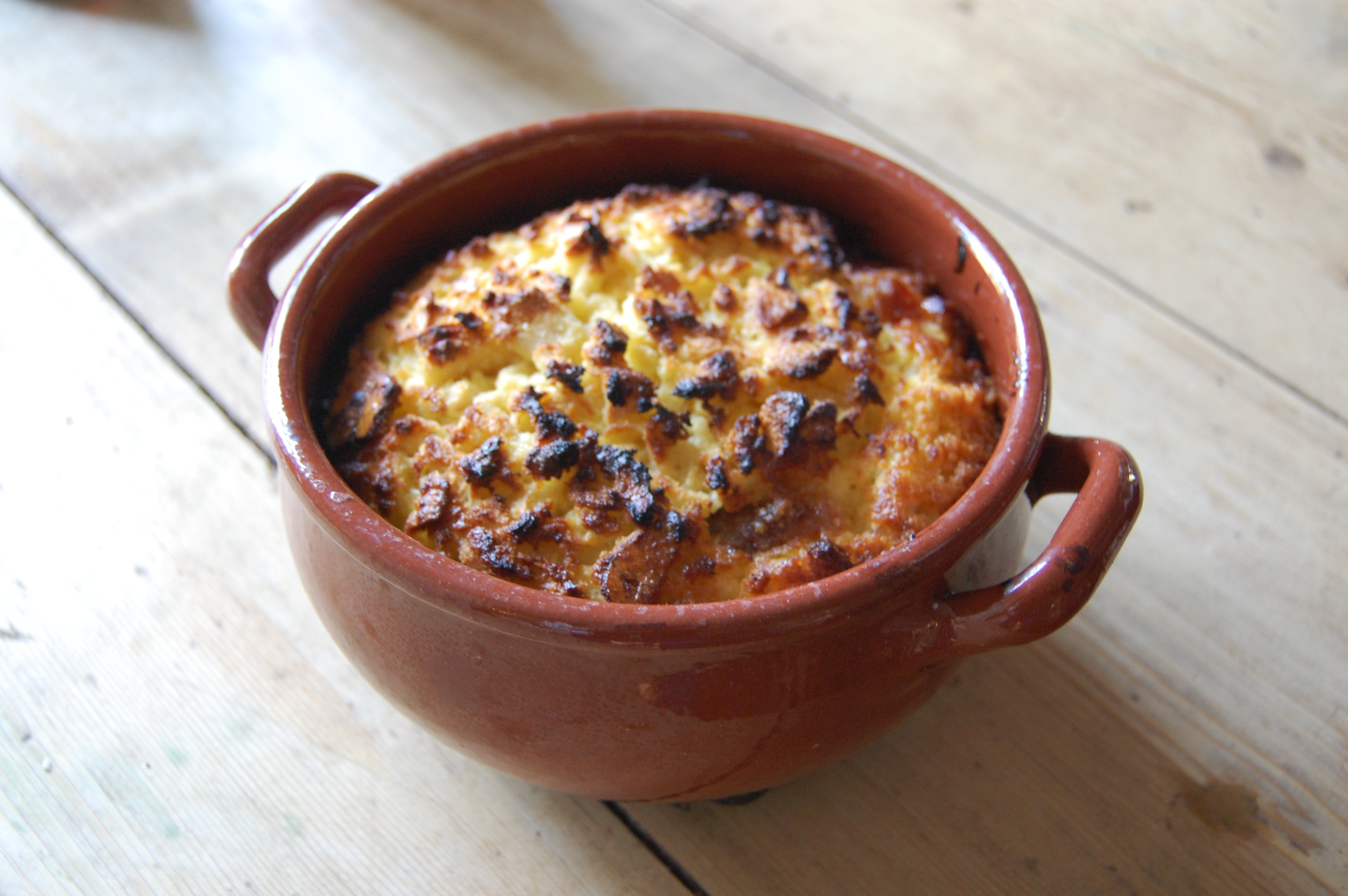
A breadcrumb-based recipe given by Mrs Beeton

References to "Bakewell pudding" appear earlier than the term "Bakewell tart", which entered common usage in the 20th century.

In the Oxford Companion to Food by Alan Davidson, it is claimed the earliest reference to "Bakewell pudding" comes from The Cook and Housewife's Manual by Margaret Dods, published in 1826. This is, however, erroneous as no recipe for "Bakewell pudding" (or indeed Bakewell tart) appears in the 1826 edition. A recipe for "bakewell pudding" does, however, appear in the 1847 edition.

== History ==
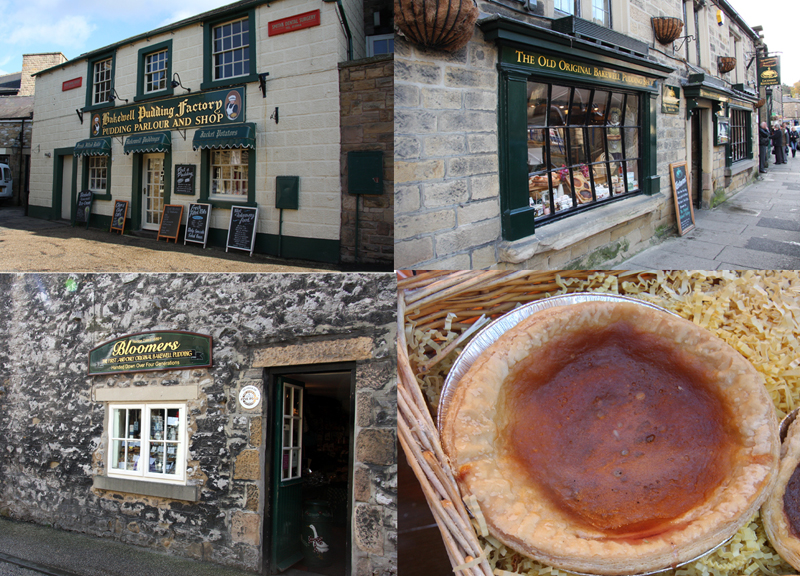
Three shops in Bakewell claim to own the original recipe of the Bakewell pudding.

The pudding originated in the Derbyshire town of Bakewell. The origins of the pudding are not clear, but a common story is that it was first made by accident in 1820 (other sources cite 1860) by Mrs Greaves, who was the landlady of the White Horse Inn (since demolished). She supposedly left instructions for her cook to make a jam tart. The cook, instead of stirring the eggs and almond paste mixture into the pastry, spread it on top of the jam. When cooked, the egg and almond paste set like an egg custard, and the result was successful enough for it to become a popular dish at the inn.

The dates and/or premises given in this story are unlikely to be accurate as the White Horse Inn was demolished in 1803 to make way for the development of Rutland Square and subsequently the Rutland Arms Hotel. Additionally, Eliza Acton provides a recipe for 'Bakewell pudding' in her book Modern Cookery for Private Families which was published in 1845, making the pudding's proposed latter creation date of 1860 impossible.

One of the earliest verifiable examples of a Bakewell pudding recipe comes from The Magazine of Domestic Economy issued in London in 1836. Eliza Acton published a recipe in her 1845 work Modern Cookery for Private Families and Mrs Beeton published two recipes for Bakewell pudding, one which used a pastry base and one which used breadcrumbs, in her Book of Household Management in 1861.

== See also ==
- List of pastries
