= Bakewell =

Market town in Derbyshire, England

Coordinates: 53.214°N 1.676°W

- Market town and civil parish
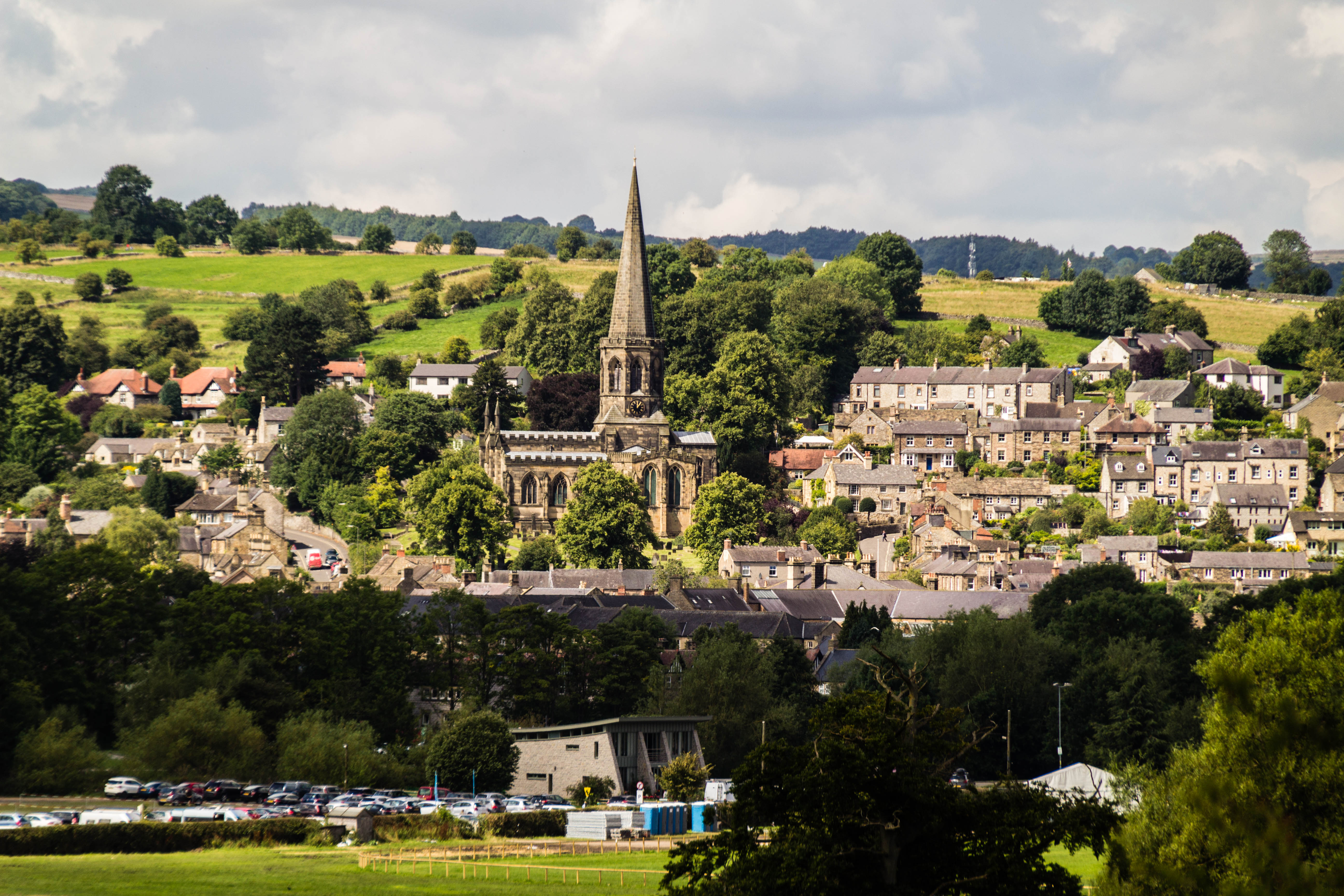
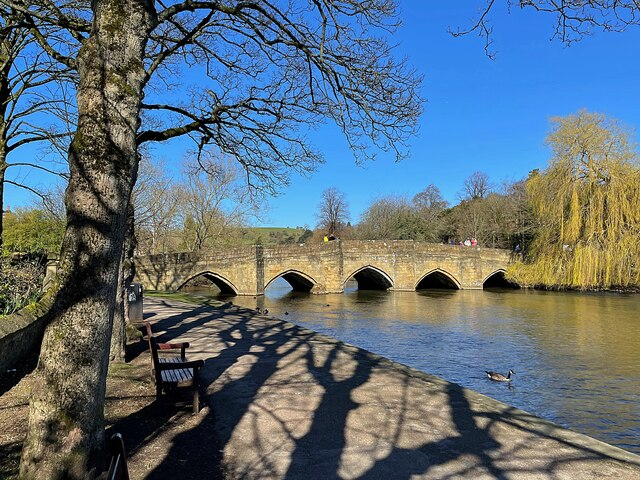
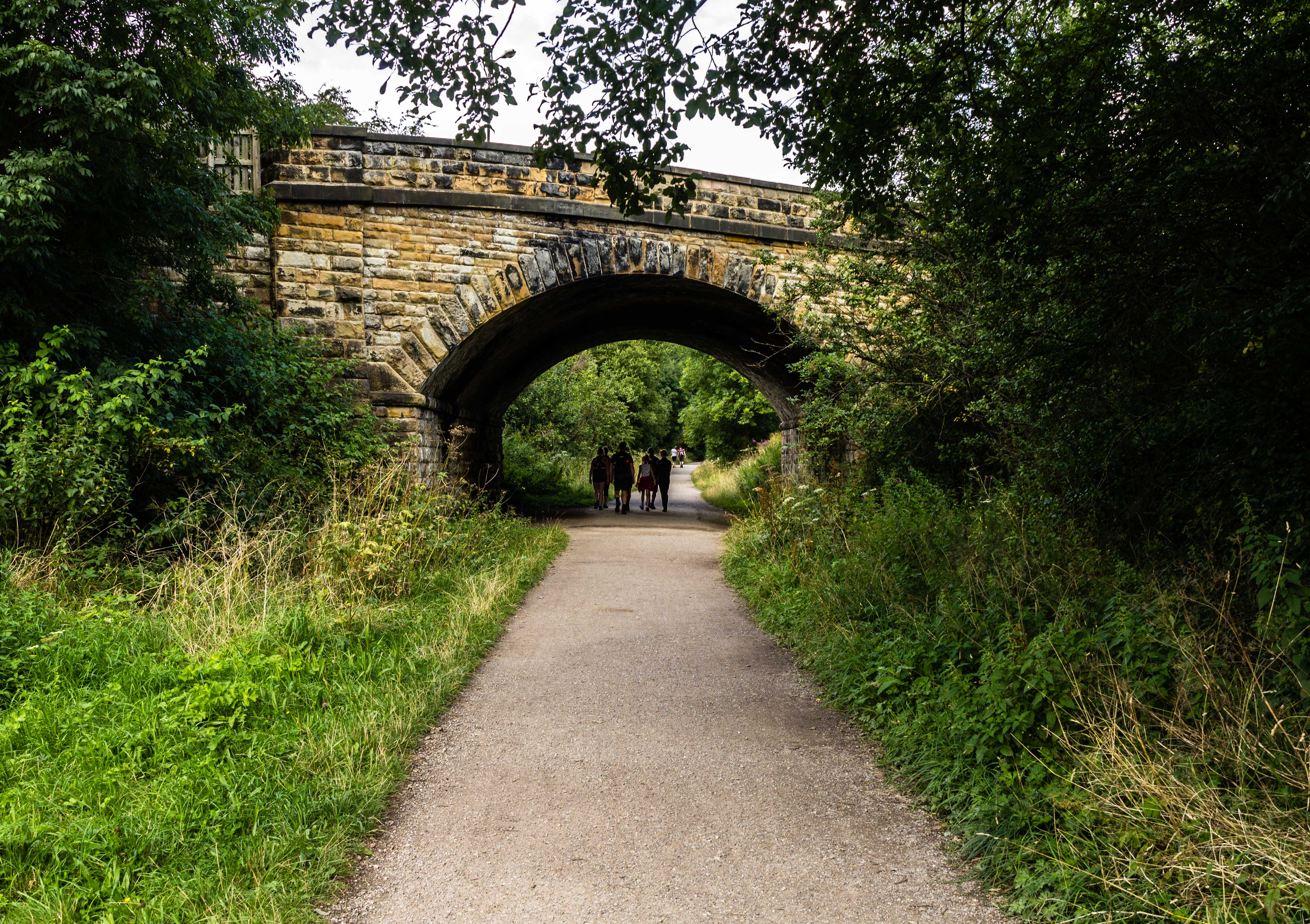
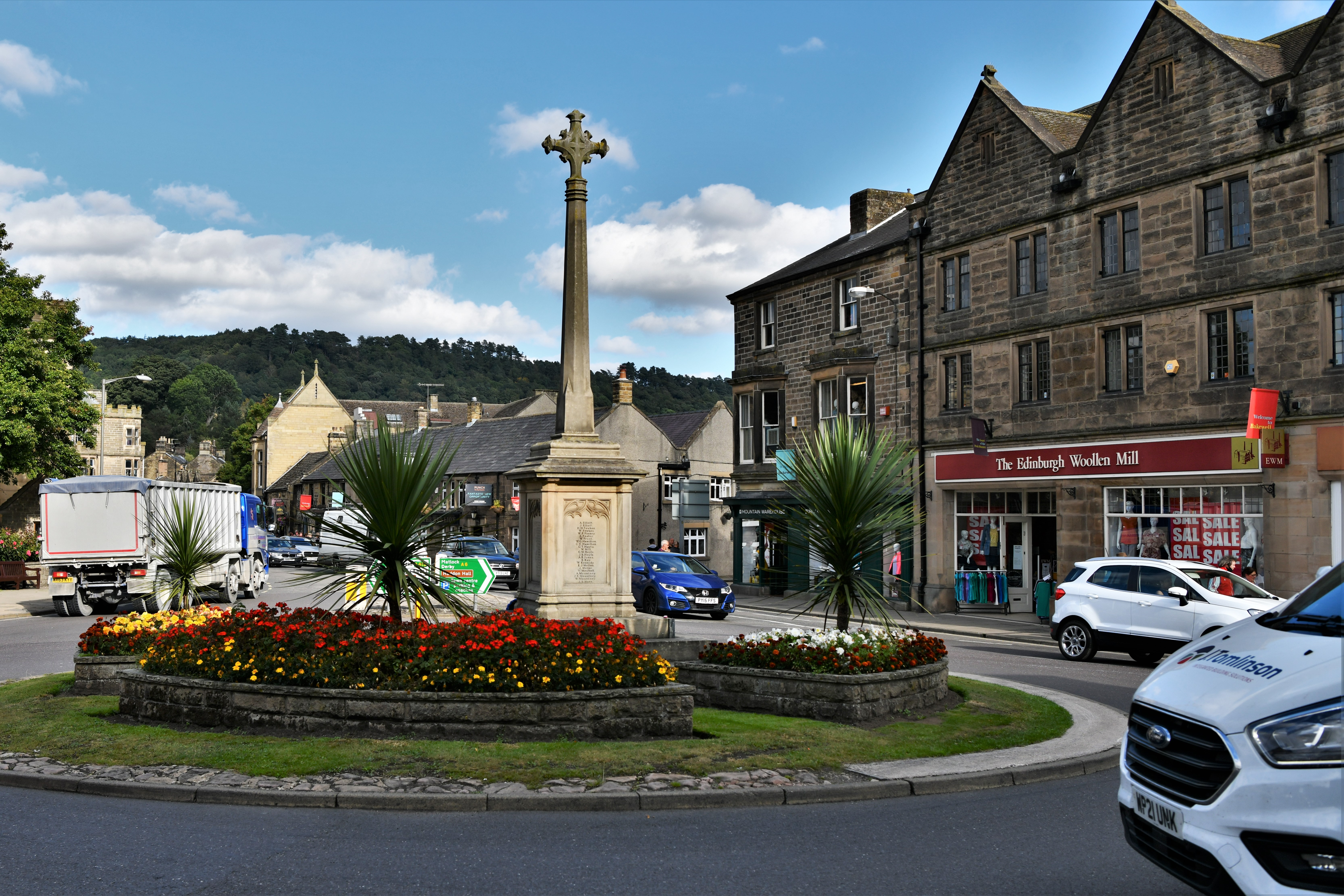
- All Saints Church The Bridge Monsal Trail Matlock Street

- Bakewell parish highlighted within Derbyshire

- Location within Derbyshire
- Interactive map of Bakewell
- Population: 3,499 (2021 Census)
- OS grid reference: SK2168
- Civil parish: Bakewell
- District: Derbyshire Dales
- Shire county: Derbyshire
- Region: East Midlands
- Country: England
- Sovereign state: United Kingdom
- Post town: BAKEWELL
- Postcode district: DE45
- Dialling code: 01629
- Police: Derbyshire
- Fire: Derbyshire
- Ambulance: East Midlands
- UK Parliament: Derbyshire Dales
- Website: https://www.bakewelltowncouncil.gov.uk/

Bakewell is a market town and civil parish in the Derbyshire Dales district of Derbyshire, England. It lies on the river Wye, 15 miles (24 km) south-west of Sheffield. It is the largest settlement and only town within the boundaries of the Peak District National Park. At the 2021 census, the population of the civil parish was 3,499. The town is close to the tourist attractions of Chatsworth House and Haddon Hall; it is best known for its Bakewell pudding and Bakewell tart.

== Toponymy ==
The name Bakewell means a spring or stream of a woman named Badeca or Beadeca, so deriving from a personal name with the Old English suffix wella. In 949, it was called Badecanwelle and Badequelle in the 1086 Domesday Book. The Domesday Book listing stated that King Edward the Confessor held land here and there was a church and a mill.

== History ==
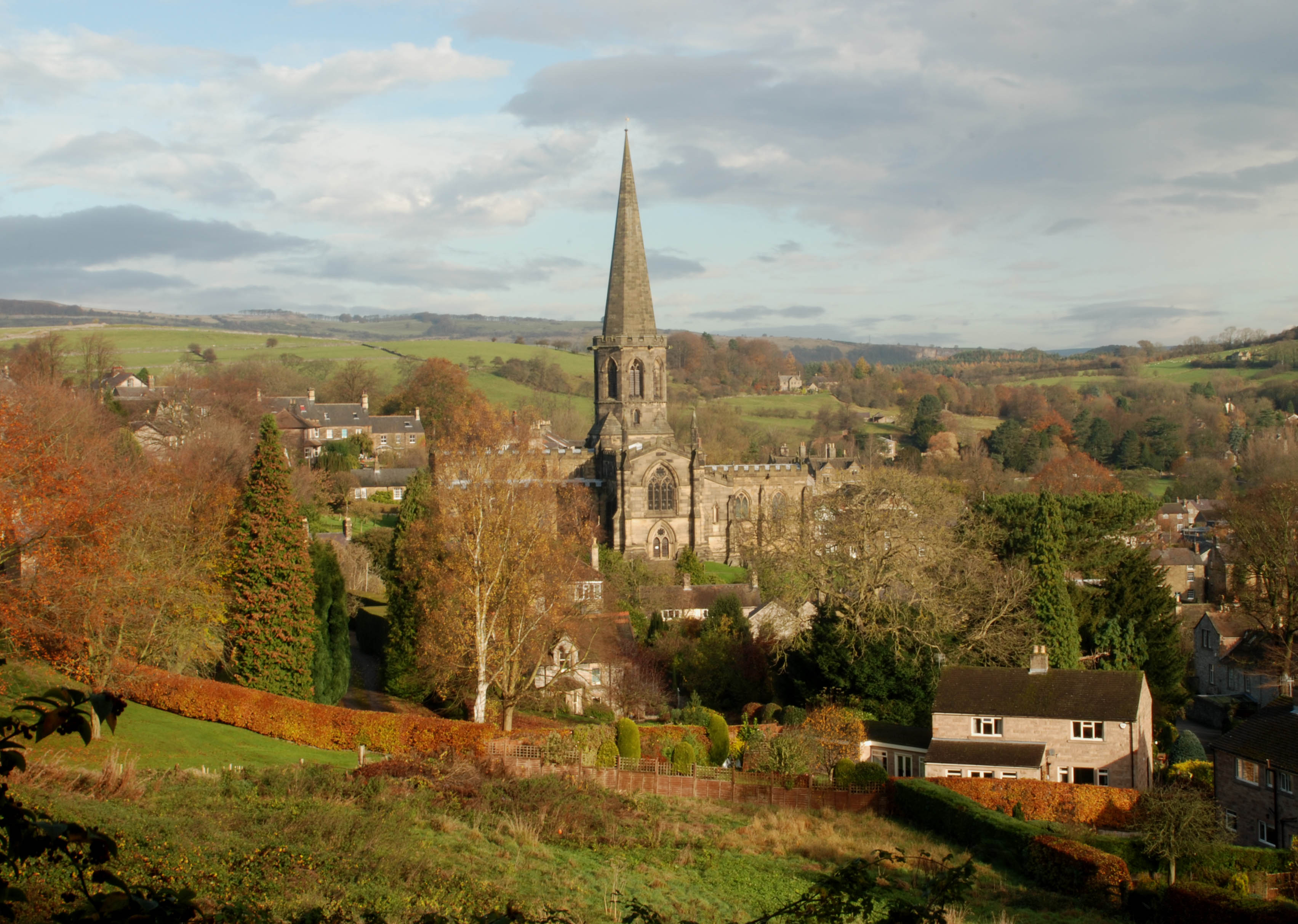
All Saints' Church

Although there is evidence of earlier settlement in the area, Bakewell itself was probably founded in Anglo-Saxon times in the Anglian kingdom of Mercia. The outlying estates or berewicks of the manor are Burton, Conksbury, Haddon, Holme, Monyash, Oneash, Over Haddon and Rowsley.

By Norman times Bakewell had gained in importance. The Domesday Book mentions the town and its church having two priests. A motte and bailey castle was built in the 12th century. In the early 14th century, the vicar was terrorised by the Coterel gang, which evicted him and confiscated his church's money at the instigation of the canons of Lichfield Cathedral.

A market was established in 1254, allowing Bakewell to develop as a trading centre. The Grade I listed five-arched bridge over the river Wye dates from the 13th century, as one of the few remnants of that period. Also Grade I listed, Holme Bridge dates from 1664 and crosses the Wye on the north-eastern outskirts of the town. A chalybeate spring was discovered and a bath house built in 1697; this led to an 18th-century attempt to develop Bakewell as a spa town in the manner of Buxton. Construction of Lumford Mill by Richard Arkwright in 1777 was followed by the rebuilding of much of the town in the 19th century.

Bakewell Parish Church, a Grade I listed building, dates from 920 and has a 9th-century cross in the churchyard. The present building was built in the 12th–13th centuries, but it was virtually rebuilt in the 1840s by William Flockton.

The mill, built about 1782 and employing over 300 people during the peak years, housed its workforce in cottages. It was sold to the Duke of Devonshire in 1860, but suffered fire damage in 1868 and was rebuilt. It is now a scheduled monument, the oldest part being Grade I listed; its layout altered in the 1800s when Rutland Square was created.A full 183 listed buildings are located in the town.

The population in the 1841 census was 1,976 inhabitants.

The Manchester, Buxton, Matlock and Midlands Junction Railway opened Bakewell railway station in 1862, then became part of the Midland Railway and later of the LMS main line from London to Manchester. John Ruskin objected to what he saw as desecration of the Derbyshire countryside and to the fact that "every fool in Buxton can be at Bakewell in half an hour, and every fool in Bakewell at Buxton." In return for the Duke of Rutland's permission for the line to pass through his estate at Haddon Hall, Bakewell station buildings on the hillside overlooking the town are more imposing than expected and the Duke's coat of arms is carved in the stonework. Such pandering to landowners was common at the time, as their support was needed to pass the Act of Parliament allowing the line to be built. However, the inconvenient altitude of the line forced Bakewell station to be placed out of town, as the Duke insisted it be out of sight of Haddon Hall. These buildings are now used by small businesses, as the line between Matlock and Buxton was closed in 1968. Most of it has been designated the Monsal Trail, a shared-use path for walking, cycling and riding.

== Geography ==
Bakewell is in the valley of the River Wye in central Derbyshire; its centre is near to the river at about 410 feet (120 m) above sea level, with the highest parts of the town at about 607 feet (185 m) on the valley sides. The town lies about 15 miles (24 km) south-west of Sheffield, 31 miles (50 km) south-east of Manchester and 21 miles (34 km) north of Derby. Nearby towns include Matlock to the south-east, Chesterfield to the east and Buxton to the north-west. Villages near Bakewell include Ashford-in-the-Water, Baslow, Elton, Great Longstone, Monyash, Over Haddon, Pilsley, Rowsley, Sheldon and Youlgreave.

== Demography ==
In the 2021 census, Bakewell had a population of 3,499, which was a notable decrease from the 2011 census. Bakewell was 98.1% White, 0.5% Asian and 1% mixed/multiple.

== Economy ==
Bakewell attracts both domestic and foreign tourists. Monday is especially popular, as this is when the town's traditional weekly market day. The cattle market is held in a purpose-built agricultural centre across the river from the town centre, where a stall market is held.

A major employer is the Peak District National Park Authority, with its offices at Aldern House, on Baslow Road. Its task is to conserve, enhance and promote understanding and enjoyment of the local area. Opposite Aldern House is another major employer, Newholme Hospital, an NHS cottage hospital providing outpatient services. The 19th-century listed building was deemed as not suitable for the delivery of modern healthcare, during the Better Care Closer to Home conference led by NHS commissioners in 2017. Subsequent to this decision, the hospital was sold in 2024 to a private developer. Newholme Health Centre now stands next to the old site. Establishment of a Costa Coffee branch in the town caused a protest among some local businesses; however, after almost ten years of trading, the coffee shop closed its doors in spring 2023.

== Landmarks ==
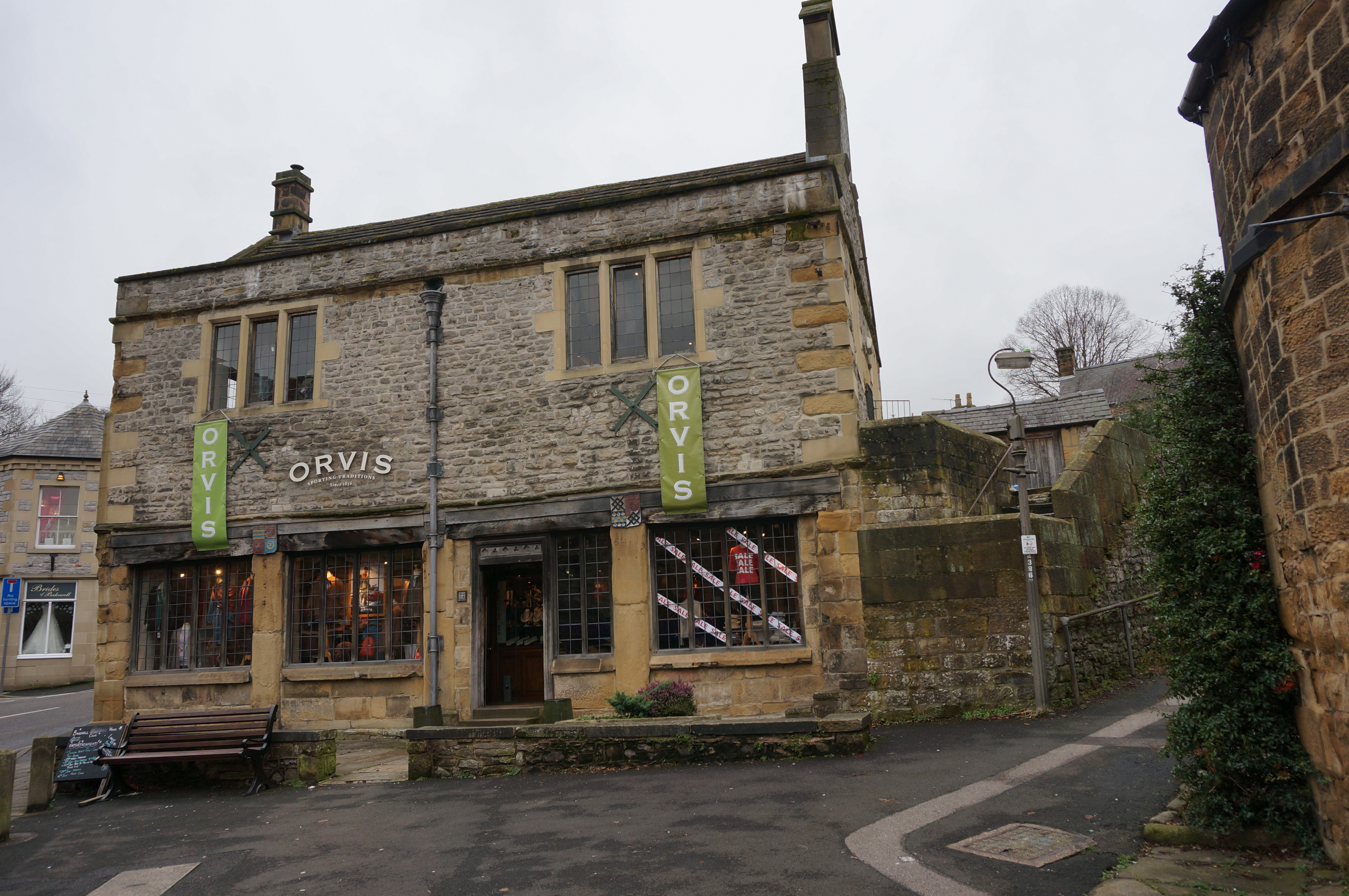
The Old Town Hall

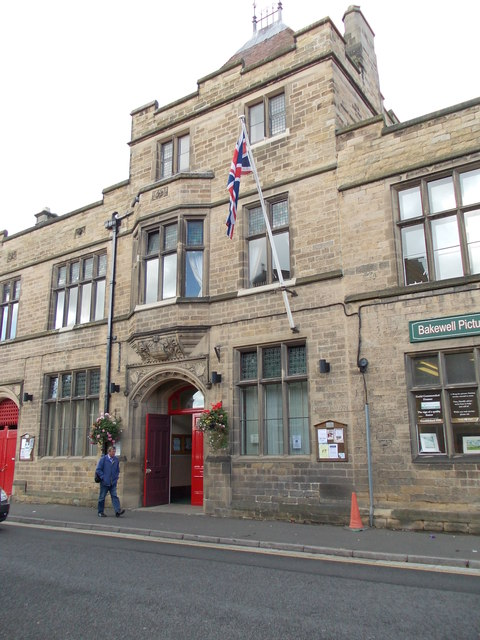
Bakewell Town Hall

All Saints' Church is a Grade I-listed church founded in 920, in Saxon times. The churchyard has two Saxon crosses:

- One is the Beeley Cross, unearthed in a field at a disputed location near Beeley and moved for some years to the grounds of Holt House near Darley Bridge. Although only the base and lower part of the shaft survive, it stands over 5 feet (150 cm) high and is carved on all four faces.
- The other is the Bakewell Cross, 8 feet (240 cm) high and almost complete. It was carved in the 7th–8th centuries and shows scenes that include the Annunciation. This may originally have stood at Hassop Cross Roads. During restoration work on the church in the 1840s, many carved fragments of Saxon stonework were found in and around the porch, along with some ancient stone coffins.

The church contains a selection of medieval and Anglo-Saxon cross fragments and carved stones collected by Thomas Bateman and donated to Weston Park Museum in Sheffield, before they were moved to Bakewell in 1899. They include a notable alabaster memorial to Sir Godfrey de Foljambe, who acquired the manor of Bakewell in about 1350, and to his wife Avena.

The town's Old House Museum occupies a 16th-century dwelling house originating from the time of Henry VIII and extended under Elizabeth I. It is a Grade II* listed building.

The Old Town Hall in King Street dates from 1602, while the current Town Hall, in Anchor Street, was completed in 1890.

== Transport ==
=== Railway ===
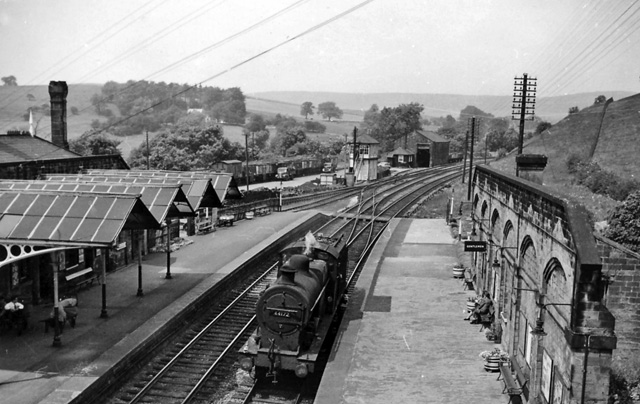
Bakewell station in 1961, looking northward

Following the closure of Bakewell station in 1968, the nearest National Rail station is now 6.2 miles (10.0 km) miles away at Matlock; East Midlands Railway operates a regular service to Derby, Nottingham, Lincoln, Grimsby and Cleethorpes. From the west, Northern Trains operates services from Buxton to Stockport and Manchester Piccadilly.

There have been efforts to reopen the remaining Wye Valley portion of the line, which would run through Bakewell and over the Monsal Dale viaduct. Peak Rail, a local preserved railway, has reopened the line from Matlock to Rowsley South; reaching Bakewell is one of its long-term ambitions and so, to keep up intentions for a future return of the railway, Derbyshire County Council currently protects the track bed from development.

=== Buses ===
Local bus services are operated by High Peak Buses, Stagecoach Yorkshire, TrentBarton and Andrews of Tideswell; routes connect the town with Buxton, Chesterfield, Derby, Macclesfield, Matlock and Sheffield.

=== Roads ===
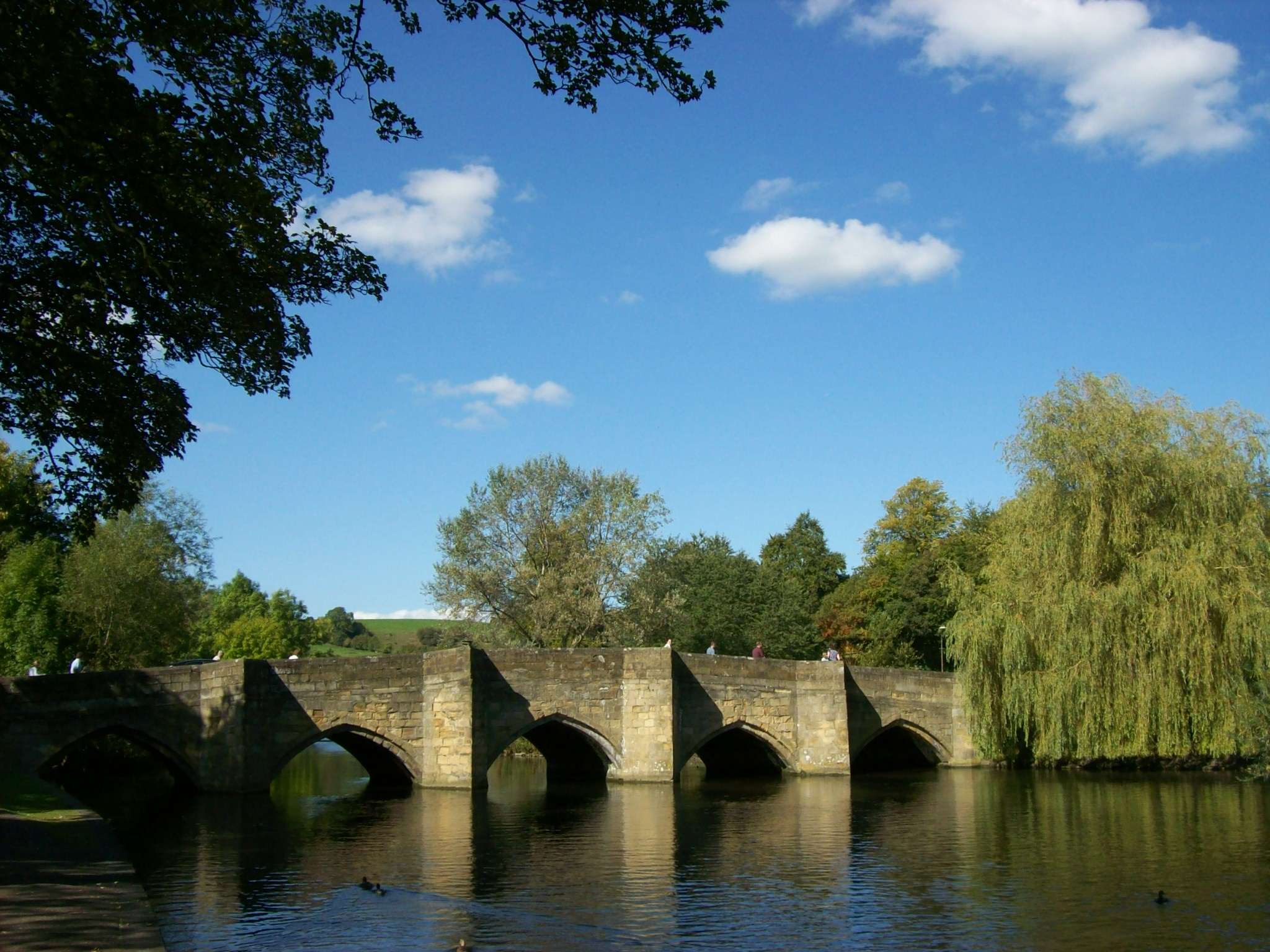
Bakewell Bridge

The A6, which links Carlisle with Luton, runs through the town; it connects Bakewell with Stockport, Manchester, Buxton, Matlock and Derby.

The A619 road begins in Bakewell, travels through Chesterfield and leads to Worksop in Nottinghamshire. The medieval Bakewell Bridge carries this road over the River Wye.

== Education ==
In 1888, William Storrs Fox, a Cambridge graduate and naturalist, founded St Anselm's School. It is now co-educational, with some 250 day and boarding pupils aged 3–16. Lady Manners School is a co-educational secondary with about 1,450 pupils. It is also home to the Brew School, the UK's biggest dedicated brewing and distilling school, established in 2014 at the historic Rutland Mill.

The town's primary schools include All Saints Church of England School and Bakewell Methodist Junior School. There are other primaries in neighbouring villages.

== Sights ==
- All Saints' Church
- Bagshaw Hall
- Bakewell Bridge
- Bakewell War Memorial
- Holme Bridge
- Lumford Mill
- Weir Bridge.

== The Bakewell pudding ==
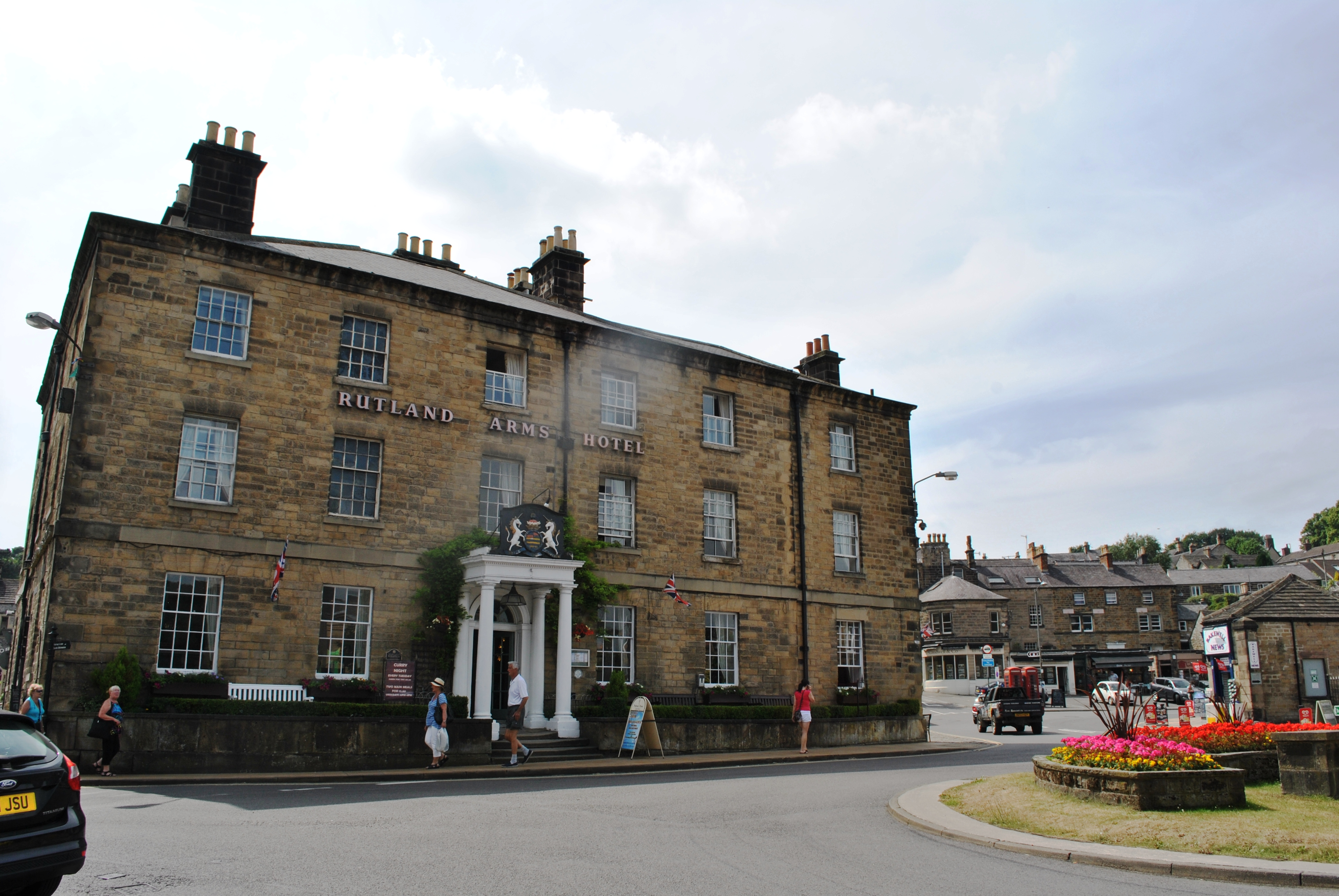
The Rutland Arms Hotel

Bakewell is known for the Bakewell pudding, a jam pastry with a filling enriched with egg and ground almond. Bakewell tart is a different confection, made with shortcrust pastry, an almond topping and a sponge and jam filling. The origins of these are not clear, but the popular story goes that the combination began by accident in 1820, when the landlady of the White Horse Inn (now the Rutland Arms Hotel) left instructions for her cook to make a jam tart with an egg and almond paste pastry base. The cook, however, spread the eggs and almond paste on top of the jam instead of mixing them into the pastry. When cooked the jam rose through the paste. The result was successful enough for it to be a popular confection at the inn. Commercial variations, usually with icing sugar on top, have spread the name.

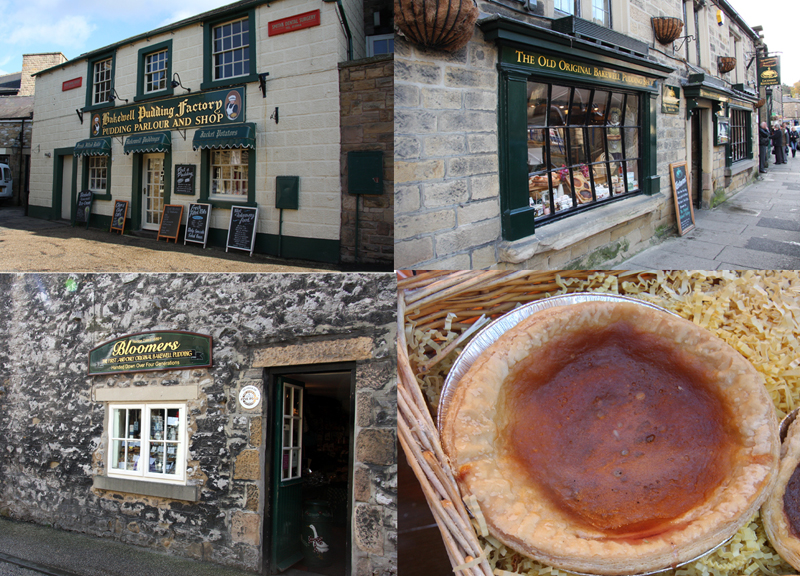
Three shops claim the original recipe for Bakewell pudding

Three shops in Bakewell offer what they claim to be the original recipe. The Bakewell Tart Shop and Coffee House sells four variations: Bakewell Tart, Iced Bakewell Tart, Moist Bakewell Tart and Traditional Bakewell Pudding. The Old Original Bakewell Pudding Shop and Bloomers of Bakewell both sell a Bakewell Pudding of their own.

== Events ==
The Peak District traditional well dressing takes place in June; colourful images made of petals embedded in clay appear at several places in the town. Then follows Carnival week, culminating in a procession at the beginning of July. August brings the Bakewell Arts Festival, a music and theatre event begun in 1997. The Peak Literary Festival is held in the spring and autumn of each year. The spring one starts on the last Friday in May and the autumn one on the last Friday in October.

Until 2017, the Bakewell Agricultural Show was among the largest covered agricultural shows in the UK, attracting about 65,000 visitors. It took place on the first Wednesday and Thursday in August, at the Bakewell Showground. Known also as the Little Royal, it was founded by Wootten Burkinshaw Thomas in 1819. In 2018 and 2019 (its bicentennial year), the show was suspended in favour of more lucrative commercial events.

== Media ==
Local television news is provided by BBC East Midlands and ITV Central; however, BBC Yorkshire and ITV Yorkshire can also be received in the town.

Local radio stations are BBC Radio Derby on 95.3 FM and Peak FM 102.0 FM.

== Sport and recreation ==
Rugby union is played regularly by Bakewell Mannerians RUFC, which competes in Midlands 2 East (North).

The town's association football team, Bakewell Town F.C., competes in the Central Midlands Football League Premier Division South.

Bakewell has a recreation park to the east of the centre, with tennis courts, a children's playground, and football and cricket pitches. Near the library there is a municipal swimming pool and gym. The River Wye provides a popular riverside walk.

== In popular culture ==
- Bakewell is named by the protagonist Elizabeth Bennet as the town from which she travelled to Pemberley, in chapter 43 of Jane Austen's Pride and Prejudice
- Bakewell features in the last episode of Most Haunted: Midsummer Murders, where the team covers a Christmas Eve murder in the 1800s
- In 2010, the Rutland Arms Hotel featured in an episode of The Hotel Inspector.
- For "Puddings Week" in series 1 of The Great British Bake Off, the tent was pitched in a car park in Bakewell.

== Stephen Downing case ==
The case involved the conviction and imprisonment in 1974 of a 17-year-old council worker, Stephen Downing, for the murder of a 32-year-old legal secretary in Bakewell cemetery. After a campaign by a local newspaper, his conviction was overturned in 2002, by which time Downing had served 27 years in prison. This is thought to be the longest miscarriage of justice in British legal history, and attracted worldwide media attention.

== Notable people ==
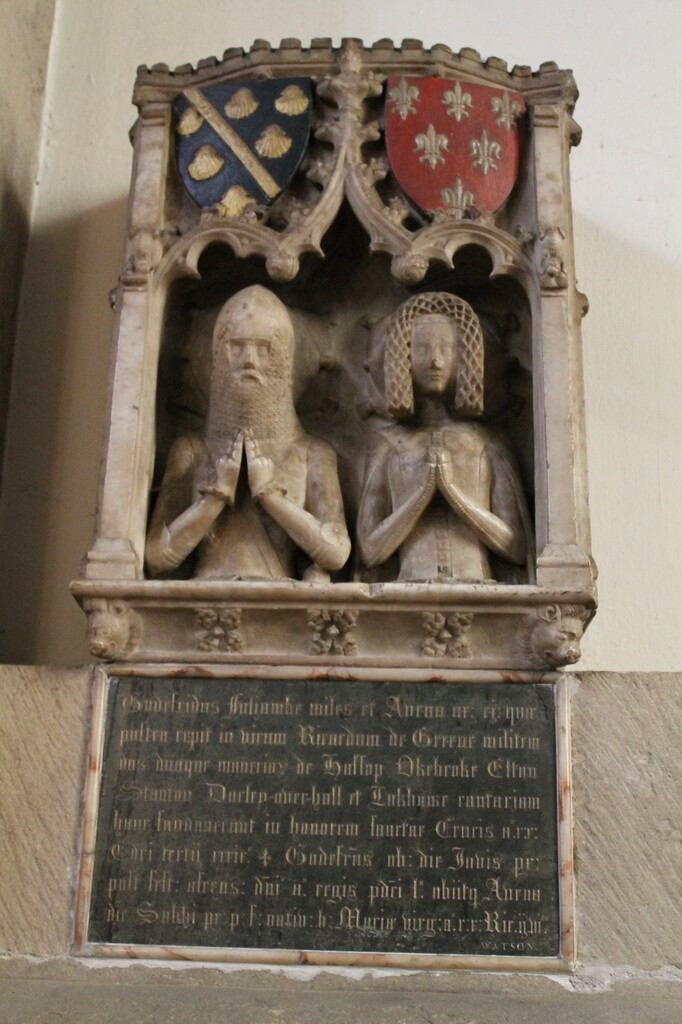
Foljambe Monument, All Saints' church, Bakewell

- Sir Godfrey de Foljambe (1317–1376), landowner and politician, a Baron of the Exchequer
- Grace, Lady Manners (c. 1575 – c. 1650), noblewoman from Haddon Hall nearby, she founded Lady Manners School in 1636
- Thomas Denman (1733–1815), physician, specialised in midwifery
- White Watson (1760–1835), geologist, sculptor, stonemason, carver, marble-worker and mineral dealer
- William Bradbury (1799–1869), printer and publisher for Charles Dickens, William Makepeace Thackeray and for Punch
- George Arkwright (1807–1856), politician, MP for Leominster, 1842 to 1856; great-grandson of Sir Richard Arkwright
- Amy Garrett Badley (1862–1956), educator, suffragist and co-founder in 1893 of Bedales School
- Sir Maurice Oldfield (1915–1981), intelligence officer and espionage administrator, the seventh director of the Secret Intelligence Service (MI6), from 1973 to 1978
- Ivor Grattan-Guinness (1941–2014), an historian of mathematics and logic
- Helen Goodman (born 1958), politician, MP for Bishop Auckland, 2005 to 2019; went to school locally
- Julie Price (born 1963), bassoonist, principal bassoonist of the BBC Symphony Orchestra
- Dominic Green (born 1967), writer of short science fiction, wrote The Clockwork Atom Bomb.

=== Sport ===
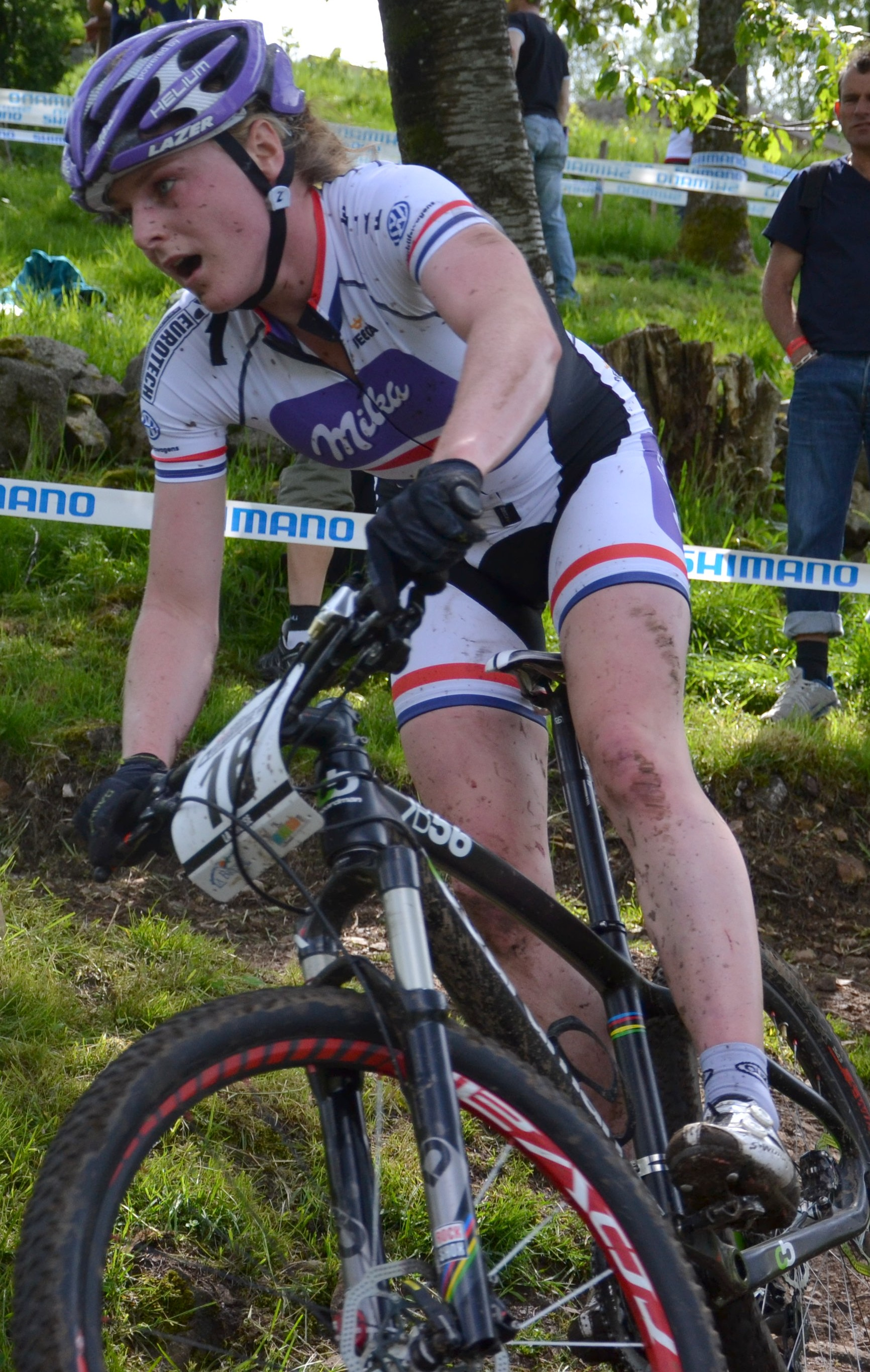
Annie Last, 2012

- Geoffrey Brooke-Taylor (1895–1968), cricketer who played 25 first-class cricket matches
- Joe Mycock (1916–2004), rugby union player who played five games for England once as captain
- David Brooke-Taylor (1920–2000), cricketer who played 15 first-class cricket matches for Derbyshire
- John Higgins (1932–2005), footballer who played 260 games including 183 for Bolton Wanderers
- Dave Metchick (born 1943), footballer who played 279 games
- Joe Neville (born 1944), sports shooter, silver medallist in the skeet event at the 1978 Commonwealth Games
- Annie Last (born 1990), cyclist, who specialises in mountain biking and cyclo-cross.

== See also ==
- Listed buildings in Bakewell.
