= Edward Gothard =

English cricketer

Personal information
- Full name: Edward James Gothard
- Born: 1 October 1904; Burton upon Trent, England
- Died: 17 January 1979 (aged 74); Birmingham, England
- Batting: Right-handed
- Bowling: Right-arm medium

Domestic team information
- Years: Team
- 1947–1948: Derbyshire
- FC debut: 31 May 1947 Derbyshire v Northamptonshire
- Last FC: 18 August 1948 Derbyshire v Essex

Career statistics
Competition	First-class
Matches	45
Runs scored	543
Batting average	12.34
100s/50s	0/1
Top score	50
Balls bowled	1,136
Wickets	18
Bowling average	40.55
5 wickets in innings	0
10 wickets in match	0
Best bowling	3/84
Catches/stumpings	10/–
- Source: CricketArchive, 16 February 2010

Edward James Gothard OBE, MBE, TD (1 October 1904 – 17 January 1979) was an English first-class cricketer who played for Derbyshire in 1947 and 1948 and captained the side in both years.

Gothard was born in Burton-on-Trent, the son of William Henry Gothard who played cricket for Staffordshire. Gothard himself represented Staffordshire in the Minor Counties Championship in 1927. He was an able rugby player but as a result of injury took to playing hockey instead. He was captain of Burton Hockey Club from 1933 to 1939. During the Second World War he played four cricket matches for Nottinghamshire in 1943. He was captain of Burton Hockey Club again from 1946 to 1947, and was a regular player for the club after the war. He played hockey for Derbyshire 30 times and was a trialist for the "Midlands".

Gothard became cricket captain for Derbyshire in the 1947 season and made his first-class debut at the age of 42 at the end of May against Northamptonshire. An innings victory marked the start of a good run for the Derbyshire team. Gothard was a strict disciplinarian, and they finished in fifth place in the 1947 County Championship. Against Middlesex Gothard took a hat-trick, including the wicket of Bill Edrich, one of the season's top scorers. During the 1948 season, Gothard clean bowled Don Bradman at Derby. At the end of the 1948 season, when Derbyshire finished sixth, he retired from first-class cricket. Gothard was a right-arm medium-pace bowler who took 18 first-class wickets at an average of 40.55 and a best performance of 3–84. He was a right-handed batsman who batted in the lower-order. He played 63 innings in 45 first-class matches with one half-century and an average of 12.34.

Gothard was later secretary and treasurer of the club. He died in Birmingham at the age of 74.

Gothard's son, Squadron Leader Edward Leigh Gothard, MBE, played first class cricket for both the Royal Air Force and the Marylebone Cricket Club (MCC).

Sporting positions
Preceded by Gilbert Hodgkinson	Derbyshire cricket captains 1947–1948	Succeeded by David Skinner
