= Whitwell Common =

Coordinates: 53.291°N 1.235°W

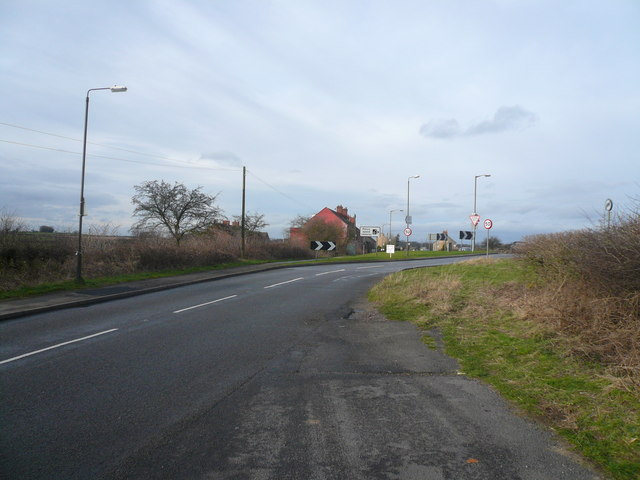
- Whitwell Common.

- Location within Derbyshire
- OS grid reference: SK510773
- District: Bolsover
- Shire county: Derbyshire
- Region: East Midlands
- Country: England
- Sovereign state: United Kingdom
- Post town: WORKSOP
- Postcode district: S80
- Police: Derbyshire
- Fire: Derbyshire
- Ambulance: East Midlands

Whitwell Common is a village, in Bolsover District, Derbyshire, lying just North-West of Whitwell, straddling the A619, which runs between Chesterfield and Worksop. A Battle during the English Civil War took place here. Population details are included on the civil parish of Whitwell.

There are many farms scattered throughout the area covered by the Common, most dating back to Medieval times. After the enclosure of the village of Whitwell, a coaching house called the Dale Inn was built in 1840. It was during the digging of the foundations that the remains of the Civil War skirmish were discovered including a sword, and ring.

Upon the building of the Dale Inn two terraces of stone farm cottages followed soon after. In the 1920s, three further terraces of brick houses were added. In the 1930s, ten semi-detached bungalows were also built.
