= Listed buildings in Bakewell =

Bakewell is a civil parish in the Derbyshire Dales district of Derbyshire, England. The parish contains over 180 listed buildings that are recorded in the National Heritage List for England. Of these, six are listed at Grade I, the highest of the three grades, three are at Grade II*, the middle grade, and the others are at Grade II, the lowest grade. The parish contains the market town of Bakewell and the surrounding area. Most of the listed buildings are houses, cottages and associated structures, shops, offices, banks, and civic buildings. The other listed buildings include churches, two medieval cross bases in a churchyard, bridges, former almshouses, a guide stone, a milestone, former corn mills, public houses, a stile, a sheepwash enclosure, a former workhouse, now a hospital, with associated buildings, a railway station, a drinking fountain, a war memorial, and two telephone kiosks.

== Key ==
Grade	Criteria
I	Buildings of exceptional interest, sometimes considered to be internationally important
II*	Particularly important buildings of more than special interest
II	Buildings of national importance and special interest

== Buildings ==
Name and location	Photograph	Date	Notes	Grade
Cross shaft 53.21276°N 1.67877°W		Later 8th or early 9th century	The cross shaft in the churchyard of All Saints' Church is in gritstone, and has been relocated from a different site. It consists of a tapered rectangular shaft about 1.5 metres (4 ft 11 in) high, and is carved with interlace and ring motifs.	I
The Great Cross and enclosure 53.21283°N 1.67842°W		Early 9th century	The Saxon cross shaft is in the churchyard of All Saints' Church, adjacent to the south transept. It is in gritstone, and consists of a chamfered socket stone and a shaft with a panelled head. The shaft is carved with vine scrolls and bas-relief carvings of animals and humans. The cross is set in an enclosure dating from the 19th century consisting of wrought iron railings with arrowhead finials, and standards with vase finials.	I
All Saints' Church; 53.21298°N 1.67856°W		12th century	The church was altered and extended through the centuries, including some rebuilding between 1841 and 1852 by William Flockton, and a restoration of the chancel in 1879–82 by George Gilbert Scott junior. The church is built in sandstone with lead roofs, and has a cruciform plan, consisting of a nave with a clerestory, north and south aisles, a south porch, a south transept with a chapel, a shorter north transept with a vestry, a chancel, and a steeple at the crossing. The steeple has a tower with an octagonal bell stage, gargoyles, an embattled parapet, and an octagonal spire with a weathervane. The parapets on the body of the church are also embattled.	I
Bakewell Bridge; 53.21453°N 1.67274°W		c. 1300	The bridge carries Bridge Street (A619 road) over the River Wye, and it was widened in the 19th century. The bridge is built in sandstone, and consists of five pointed arches. It has ribbed soffits, triangular cutwaters rising as pedestrian refuges, and a band under the parapet. There is a cross base on the apex of the downstream cutwater to the west of the central arch.	I
Avenel Court; 53.21272°N 1.67645°W		16th century (probable)	A shop with outbuildings, it was refronted in about 1780, and is in limestone with chamfered quoins, and a stone slate roof with a coped gable. There are two storeys and three bays, the left two bays gabled, and at the rear are outbuildings enclosing three sides of a courtyard. On the front is an 18th-century shop front consisting of central double doors with pilasters and consoles, flanked by bow windows under a dentilled cornice. The upper floor contains sash windows with architraves, and above is a roundel in an architrave. The right bay is recessed, and contains a canted bay window, and a sash window above. The rear courtyard includes a bay with replica timber framing and a jettied upper storey.	II
Old House Museum and mounting block 53.21354°N 1.67982°W		16th century	The house has been altered and extended through the centuries, and in the mid 20th-century it was converted into a museum. It is in limestone with sandstone dressings, quoins, and a stone slate roof with coped gables and shaped kneelers. There are two storeys and an irregular H-shaped plan, the left cross-wing being the earliest part. On the front is a gabled two-storey porch that has a doorway with a quoined surround and an elongated lintel, and most of the windows are mullioned. Attached to the wall of the right cross-wing is a mounting block. Inside the house is a timber framed partition and wattle and daub infill.	II*
Market Hall; 53.21376°N 1.67407°W		c. 1600	The market hall was altered in the 18th century and extended in 1885, it was used at one time as the town hall, and later as an information centre. The building is in sandstone with a plinth, quoins, a sill band, and a double-span stone slate roof with moulded gable copings and shaped kneelers. There are two storeys and five bays. On the Bridge Street front are two-light mullioned windows with chamfered surrounds, and four blind gabled dormers containing painted shields. At the rear is a porch with a triangular-headed entrance, and a parapet with moulded copings. In the left return is a three-light mullioned window with a hood mould and an oriel window.	II
Old Town Hall or Buttermarket; 53.21256°N 1.67684°W		1602	Originally a town hall and hospital, it was altered in 1709, and has since been used for various purposes. It is in limestone with sandstone dressings, quoins, a coped parapet, and a stone slate roof with a bellcote on the right gable. There are two storeys, two bays, a rear wing, and external steps on the right return. The ground floor was originally open with three square piers, and has been infilled with mullioned windows and a doorway that has a wooden lintel with armorial crests. In the upper floor are two three-light mullioned windows and a continuous hood mould, and in the right return is a doorway with a quoined surround.	II
Bagshaw Hall; 53.21416°N 1.67772°W		Early 17th century	A large house, later used for other purposes, the oldest part is the rear range, the main part is dated 1684, and a side wing was added in the 19th century. The earlier part is in limestone with gritstone dressings, the later part is in sandstone, and the roofs are in stone slate. The main part has two storeys, cellars and attics, to the right is a three-bay wing, and at the rear on the left is a parallel 17th-century range. The main part is on a plinth, and has quoins, and a symmetrical front of nine bays, the outer two bays being gabled cross-wings. In the centre, steps lead up to a central doorway with a moulded architrave, a dated frieze and a pediment on consoles, and the windows are mullioned. Above is a balustrade and three gabled dormers. The cross-wings have coped parapets with ball finials.	II*
Wye Cottage and Granby Cottage; 53.21323°N 1.67463°W		Early 17th century	A pair of houses in limestone, partly roughcast, with sandstone dressings, quoins, and roofs of stone slate and tile. There are two storeys, the houses are at right angles, and each has two bays. Most of the windows are casements, and there is one mullioned and transomed window.	II
Holme Hall; 53.21862°N 1.67883°W		1626	A large house, the main part was built in 1628, and there are earlier and later wings. It is in limestone and chert, with some sandstone, and has roofs of slate and stone slate. The main block has three storeys and fronts of three and four bays, there is a later lower rear wing with two storeys and attics and three bays, and a three-bay wing on the left. The entrance front has a chamfered plinth, quoins, string courses, and embattled parapets with shaped finials and a dated bellcote. In the centre is a three-storey porch containing a doorway with a moulded surround, and a cross window with a lintel containing a dated panel. The flanking bays have canted two-storey bay windows, and most of the other windows are mullioned or mullioned and transomed. The left wing has three dormers with ogee gables and finials, each containing an oeil-de-boeuf with keystones.	I
Walls, gates and gate piers, Bagshaw Hall; 53.21408°N 1.67792°W		17th century	The boundary walls are in limestone and sandstone with sandstone copings. There are two entrances flanked by square sandstone rusticated gate piers with moulded plinths, cornices, upswept pedestals, and ball finials. The gates are in iron.	II
Former garden wall, Bagshaw Hall; 53.21401°N 1.67774°W		17th century	The wall enclosed the former garden of the hall, an area of about 50 metres (160 ft) by 40 metres (130 ft). It is mainly in limestone, with some sandstone, quoins, and triangular copings. The wall contains a gateway with a quoined and chamfered surround, and later pedestrian and vehicle entrances. Within the enclosure is a north–south retaining wall, and it is now occupied by housing.	II
Terrace walls, steps and gateways, Holme Hall; 53.21885°N 1.67854°W	—	17th century	The walls and steps are in limestone and sandstone. The retaining wall is about 3.5 metres (11 ft) high and 50 metres (160 ft) long. There is a lower wall with a round-arched opening. The other openings include a rusticated archway with a plinth, and moulded imposts flanked by oeil-de-boeuf openings with keystones. In the upper wall is a round-arched gateway leading to steps and gate piers with pyramidal tops. Another gateway has a quoined surround, a round-arched parapet and a square dated sundial, moulded copings and a pierced finial.	II
Ivy House; 53.21244°N 1.67779°W		Mid 17th century	The front of the house was remodelled in 1743. The house is in limestone with sandstone dressings, quoins, a moulded eaves cornice, a corniced parapet, and a roof of Welsh slate and stone slate with chamfered gable copings and shaped kneelers. There are two storeys, attics and cellars, a front range of five bays, and a parallel rear range of two bays. The doorway has a moulded architrave and a segmental pediment on shaped brackets. Most of the windows are mullioned with two lights, and in the middle bay of the upper floor is a single-light window with an architrave and a double keystone.	II
The Old Cottage; 53.21259°N 1.67778°W		17th century	A house with a timber framed core, walls of limestone and sandstone, quoins, and a stone slate roof. There are two storeys, two bays, and a rear wing on the right. The windows are sashes.	II
The Old Original Bakewell Pudding Shop; 53.21341°N 1.67476°W		17th century (possible)	A shop that was altered in the 19th century, it is in sandstone, with quoins, and a tile roof with coped gables. There are two storeys, three bays, and a recessed bay on the right. The doorway has a cornice on shaped brackets, and it is flanked by shop windows with pilasters and cornices. In the upper floor are two-light mullioned windows. The right bay contains a doorway and a window converted from a doorway in the ground floor, and a sash window above.	II
Holme Bridge; 53.21758°N 1.67874°W		1664	A packhorse bridge crossing the River Wye, it is in gritstone, and consists of five unequal segmental arches with cutwaters rising to form refuges. The bridge has a low parapet with chamfered copings, and at the apex of a cutwater is a cross base. At the south end are later walls with two round arches, and the north approach has stone bollards and a railing.	I
1 and 2 Stanedge Road; 53.21431°N 1.67914°W		Late 17th century	A house, later divided, in limestone with sandstone dressings, quoins and a stone slate roof. There are two storeys, two bays, and a rear outshut. The doorway has a quoined surround, and the windows are mullioned casements, some with quoined surrounds.	II
Summer house and enclosure, Holme Hall; 53.21853°N 1.67771°W		Late 17th century	The summer house is in limestone with sandstone dressings, quoins, an eaves cornice, and a pyramidal stone slate roof with an apex ball finial. There is a single storey and a half-basement, and a square plan. The round-arched doorway has a chamfered quoined surround, a fanlight, and imposts, and in the other fronts are casement windows. The attached enclosure has limestone walls with sandstone copings dating probably from the 18th century.	II
Holme Grange, The Mews Cottage, and wall with mounting block 53.21806°N 1.67822°W		Late 17th century	A coach house and stables converted for residential use, they are in limestone with sandstone dressings, quoins, and stone slate roofs with coped gables. They consist of two parallel ranges with two storeys and five bays each, single-storey extensions at the south end, and a screen wall with a doorway and mounting block at the north end. The west range is the earlier, and contains three doorways with quoined surrounds, three linked basket arches, and two hatch openings. The east range has an eaves band, a moulded cornice, and contains a doorway with a quoined surround and a keystone. In the right gable end is a round-arched panel containing a dovecote, and on the left gable end are external steps.	II
Saxon Cottage and Dial Cottage; 53.21261°N 1.67740°W		Late 17th century	A row of houses, later three dwellings, in sandstone and limestone, with a roof of stone slate and tile. There are two storeys and seven bays. Most of the windows are mullioned, and on the front is a sundial.	II
The Hall Cottage; 53.21446°N 1.67760°W		c. 1685	Originally the laundry to Bagshaw Hall, it is in sandstone, on a chamfered plinth, with quoins, and a stone slate roof with chamfered gable copings and shaped kneelers. There is a single storey and an attic, and a symmetrical front of three bays. The central doorway has a chamfered and quoined surround, a fanlight, and a deep lintel. The windows are casements with mullions, and above the doorway is a gabled dormer.	II
Haig House, steps and railings 53.21399°N 1.67599°W		1697	A house that contains a natural spring bathing pool, it has been altered and extended. It is in sandstone and limestone, with roofs of Welsh slate, stone slate and tile. It consists of the original three-storey house with an attic and an L-shaped plan, the angle has been infilled, and along the west side is a long two-storey wing with an attached single-storey wing. The original part has quoins, chamfered gable copings, shaped kneelers, and ball finials. The doorway is approached by steps with a curved handrail. Most of the windows are mullioned, and there is a large round-arched three-light window with a transom.	II
Bank House No. 1; 53.21414°N 1.67561°W		c. 1700	Part of a house that was refronted in the 18th century and altered in the 19th century. The front is in sandstone, the rest is in limestone, and the roof is in stone slate and tile. The front facing the street is on a plinth, and has a coped gable forming a pediment, chamfered quoins, lintel bands, two storeys and an attic, and two bays. The windows are sashes, and in the tympanum of the pediment is an oeil-de-boeuf with keystones. In the right return is a bow window and a conservatory porch.	II
The Cottage, Bath Street; 53.21412°N 1.67606°W		Late 17th to early 18th century	A limestone house with sandstone dressings and a stone slate roof. There are two storeys and three bays, the right bay recessed. The doorway has a plain lintel, and the windows are mullioned.	II
The Nook and Rose Cottage; 53.21270°N 1.67678°W		Late 17th to early 18th century	A pair of houses in limestone with gritstone dressings, and roofs of Welsh slate and stone slate. There are two storeys, three bays, and an angled bay on the right. The doorways have gritstone lintels, most of the windows are mullioned, and in the angled bay is a single-light window.	II
St John's Hospital and front wall 53.21254°N 1.67705°W		1709	The former almshouses are in limestone with sandstone dressings, on a chamfered plinth, with quoins and a stone slate roof. There is a single storey and attics, and six bays in three pairs, with a pedimented gable over each pair. The doorways are paired and have quoined surrounds and deep lintels, and the windows are mullioned with two lights. Over the ground floor openings is a continuous hood mould. The front wall has chamfered copings, and a central opening with round-headed gate piers.	II
Denman House; 53.21347°N 1.67434°W		Early 18th century	A house later used for other purposes, it is in sandstone with quoins, a floor band, an eaves cornice, a parapet, and a stone slate roof, There are three storeys, five bays, and two rear wings. In the ground floor are projecting shop fronts, with a central doorway that has a segmental pediment on acanthus-carved consoles. The upper floors contain sash windows.	II
East Lodge and wall, Holme Hall; 53.21824°N 1.67579°W		Early 18th century (probable)	The lodge is in limestone with sandstone dressings, quoins, and a slate roof with chamfered gable copings, shaped kneelers, and an apex finial. There are two storeys and two bays. The doorway has a moulded cornice on shaped corbels, and the windows are mullioned. Attached is a garden wall containing a gateway with a moulded surround and a hood mould.	II
King's Court; 53.21268°N 1.67661°W		Early 18th century (probable)	The entrance to a group of shops, it is in sandstone with quoins and a Welsh slate roof. There are two storeys and three bays, and the wall is angled on the left. In the centre are two doorways, to the right is a bow window, the other windows are horizontally-sliding sashes, and in the centre of the upper floor is an oculus.	II
Milford House including Ormonde; 53.21545°N 1.67681°W		Early 18th century	A house that was later altered and extended, and at one time a hotel, it is in sandstone and limestone, with roofs of Welsh slate, stone slate, and tile, and coped gables. The main range has three storeys and three bays, there is a parallel earlier range at the rear, a two-storey single-bay wing on the left, a two-storey wing projecting on the right, and a taller side wing at the rear. The garden front has a rusticated plinth, quoins, a sill band, a string course, and a dentilled cornice. In the centre is a porch with a two-arch arcade on half-columns, a lantern on the right corner, and a cornice with a blocking course. The round-arched entrance is in the right return and the doorway has an architrave, a pulvinated frieze, and a dentilled cornice. The windows in the main range are sashes in architraves. In the left wing is a corbelled oriel window with an armorial crest and ball finials. The right wing contains a mullioned and transomed window.	II
Parsonage Cottage; 53.21271°N 1.68002°W		Early 18th century	A house that was extended and altered in the 19th century, it is in limestone, with quoins, a chamfered eaves band, and a slate roof, hipped on the right with lead ridges. There are two storeys, and five bays, the right two bays lower. On the front is a gabled porch with a round arch. The windows are casements, and on the front is a stair window.	II
The Cottage, Butts Road; 53.21102°N 1.67716°W		Early 18th century	The house is in limestone and sandstone, roughcast at the rear, with quoins, and a red tile roof. There are two storeys, two bays, and a single-storey, two-bay wing on the left. The doorway has a plain lintel, and the windows are casements, those in the main part with mullions.	II
The Cottage, Coombs Road; 53.21469°N 1.66822°W		Early 18th century	A house that has been altered and extended, it is in sandstone, with quoins, a stone slate roof, and two storeys. The entrance front is irregular, and contains a canted bay window, two two-light mullioned windows, two garage doors, and three gabled half-dormers. The garden front has twin gables, and a third recessed gable, and it contains transomed casement windows. Recessed on the left is a conservatory.	II
Rock House; 53.21609°N 1.67825°W		Early to mid 18th century	The house is in limestone with sandstone dressings and roofs of Welsh slate and stone slate. There are two storeys, and the house consists of a two-bay range with an outbuilding on the left, and on the right is a wing facing the road with a lean-to. Most of the windows are sashes, in the outbuilding is a casement window, and the wing contains two-light mullioned windows. On the left return is a flight of stone steps to a loft door.	II
Rutland Chambers; 53.21346°N 1.67675°W		Early to mid 18th century	A house that was later extended, and at one time an office. It is in limestone with sandstone dressings, quoins, and a stone slate roof with tiles at the rear. There are two storeys and three bays, the left bay added later. On the front are two doorways with canopies on shaped brackets, and the windows are mullioned.	II
Bank House Nos. 2 and 3; 53.21425°N 1.67557°W		Mid 18th century	Part of a house, at one time a school, divided into two dwellings. It is in limestone with sandstone dressings, quoins, a lintel band, a coped parapet, and a roof of Welsh slate and stone slate with coped gables. There are three storeys, four bays, a single-storey wing on the right, and at the rear are a staircase projection and a lean-to. The doorway has a fanlight, some of the windows are sashes, and others are mullioned.	II
Bridge Cottage; 53.21492°N 1.67197°W		Mid 18th century	The house is roughcast with sandstone dressings, a wing in sandstone, and a stone slate roof with coped gables and shaped kneelers. There are two storeys, three bays, and a two-bay wing on the left. The doorway has a wooden cornice on shaped brackets, the windows are mullioned, and in the right return is a canted bay window.	II
Butts House and wall 53.21209°N 1.67802°W		18th century	The house is in mixed limestone and sandstone, partly roughcast, with quoins, an eaves cornice, and a tile roof with moulded ridge tiles, coped gables and a hipped roof on the wing. There are two storeys and attics, and a T-shaped plan, with a range of four bays and a wing projecting from the third bay. The porch has a doorway with an architrave, a frieze and a cornice. The windows are sashes, and on the wing is a canted bay window. The attached wall is in sandstone with copings, it contains a round-arch doorway, it has a maximum height of about 3 metres (9.8 ft), and extends for about 30 metres (98 ft).	II
Catcliffe House and railings 53.21245°N 1.67655°W		Mid 18th century	A sandstone house with chamfered rusticated quoins, sill bands, a corbel table, a moulded eaves cornice, and a stone slate roof with coped gables. There are three storeys, a symmetrical front of three bays, and a rear wing. Steps lead up to the central doorway that has a quoined surround, a fanlight, and a triangular pediment. The windows in the lower two floors are sashes, those in the ground floor, and the central window in the middle floor, with quoined surrounds, and the windows in the top floor are casements. Surrounding a small enclosure at the front of the house are iron railings.	II
Coulsden Cottage; 53.21413°N 1.67620°W		18th century	The cottage, which probably originated as an outbuilding, is in limestone with a stone slate roof. There is a single storey and two bays. On the front is a doorway and two casement windows, and at the rear is a stable door, casement windows, a lean-to, and three corbels at the eaves.	II
Croft Cottages and outbuilding 53.21465°N 1.67085°W		18th century	A house, later divided, in limestone and sandstone, with quoins, and a stone slate roof, the left gable splayed. There are two storeys and four bays, the centre projecting under a catslide roof. The windows are sashes, and at the rear left-hand corner is an attached outbuilding.	II
Guide Pillar; 53.21098°N 1.69733°W		Mid 18th century	The guide stone is in sandstone, with a square section, it is about 1 metre (3 ft 3 in) with a larger section at the top. It is carved with pointing fingers and the town names of Tideswell, Buxton, Winster and Bakewell.	II
Former Berkley Wines shop 53.21216°N 1.67493°W		Mid 18th century	A shop with living accommodation above, it is in sandstone with quoins, and a stone slate roof with coped gables. There are two storeys and two bays. In the ground floor is a shop window with a doorway to the left, and the upper floor contains casement windows.	II
Haddon House, wall and archway 53.20312°N 1.66630°W		18th century	The house, which was largely rebuilt in about 1840, is in sandstone, with some limestone partly rendered, on a plinth, with a roof of slate and stone slate, and is in Tudor Revival style. There are two storeys and attics, and a U-shaped plan, consisting of a front range of six bays, the third bay gabled, an open courtyard on the left, and at the rear is a wall on the right, and an archway on the left. Steps lead to a doorway in the fourth bay that has a Tudor arched head and a hood mould. In the third bay is a canted bay window with an embattled parapet. The two right bays are recessed, and the end bay contains a two-storey canted bay window. The windows have chamfered surrounds, lights with Tudor arched heads, and hood moulds.	II
Entrance walls and gate piers, Holme Grange; 53.21788°N 1.67823°W		Mid 18th century (probable)	Curved walls flank the entrance, and each contains three piers. The piers are square and in sandstone; those at the entrance have bands, upswept pedestals and ball finials, and the others have domed caps. The walls are in limestone with sandstone copings. On each side, the walls contain gate openings.	II
Wall east of Holme Grange; 53.21827°N 1.67754°W	—	18th century (probable)	The wall is in limestone and encloses a garden about 50 metres (160 ft) by 65 metres (213 ft). It is about 3 metres (9.8 ft) high, and has freestanding sections, one containing a round-arched gateway and a square-headed gateway.	II
Gazebo, Holme Hall; 53.22000°N 1.67950°W		Mid 18th century	The gazebo in the grounds of the hall has a sandstone front, with limestone elsewhere, and a concrete roof, and it is set into a bank. The gazebo contains a round arch flanked by semi-domed niches with oval niches above. Above is a moulded cornice, and an incomplete balustrade flanked by piers with ball finials. On the sides are solid parapets.	II
Imsworth Cottage, Gritston Cottage and Wainstones; 53.21322°N 1.67740°W		18th century (probable)	A row of three houses that were refronted in the early 19th century. They have a front of sandstone, with limestone elsewhere, quoins on the right, and a Welsh slate roof. There are two storeys, the right house has an attic, each house has one bay, and there is a short rear wing on the right. The openings have flush surrounds, the right house has casement windows, and in the other houses the windows are sashes.	II
Wall at rear of St John's Hospital; 53.21265°N 1.67714°W		18th century	The wall is in limestone with gritstone quoins and copings. It contains a doorway with gritstone jambs and a lintel formed by the coping, and there is a blocked doorway elsewhere.	II
Little Hill Cottage; 53.21271°N 1.67686°W		18th century (probable)	A pair of houses later combined, and refronted in the early 19th century. The building is in rendered limestone with a roof of Welsh slate and stone slate. There are two storeys and two bays, the right bay lower. The doorways near the centre have a canopy on shaped brackets, a trefoil-pierced frieze, and a slate roof. There is one casement window, and the other windows are sashes. On the left is an upper floor doorway approached by a raised pavement with railings.	II
Lumford House; 53.21802°N 1.67885°W		Mid 18th century	The house, which was later extended, has been divided into three. It is in sandstone with limestone at the rear, on a plinth, with quoins, sill bands, an eaves lintel band, a stone slate roof with coped gables, and with Welsh slate on the roof of the later wing. There are two storeys and seven bays. On the front is a porch with a barrel-roof, and an arched carved cornice with a ball finial. To the right is a doorway with a segmental pediment, and the windows are sashes. In the left return is a round-headed blind window with imposts and a keystone.	II
Outrake Cottage; 53.21490°N 1.66612°W		Mid 18th century	A farmhouse in sandstone with some limestone, quoins, and a stone slate roof. There are two storeys and three bays, the left bay slightly recessed. On the front is a gabled porch, and the windows are mullioned with casements.	II
The Nook and Studio House; 53.21403°N 1.67697°W		18th century	A pair of houses rebuilt in the 19th century, they are in limestone with roofs of stone slate and some tile. There are two storeys and four bays. Studio House has a doorway with Doric columns, an entablature, and a triangular lintel. Along the front of The Nook is a conservatory-porch and two doorways with triangular lintels. There is one casement window, and the other windows are horizontally-sliding sashes, some with hood moulds. On the right are external steps.	II
Yew Tree House; 53.21409°N 1.67817°W		18th century	The house is in limestone with sandstone dressings, quoins, an eaves band and cornice, and a tile roof with a coped gable on the right. There are three storeys, two bays, and rear stair wing. The central doorway and the windows have architraves. To the right of the doorway is a canted bay window, and the other windows in the lower two floors are mullioned.	II
Former Chappells Antiques shop 53.21256°N 1.67627°W		Mid to late 18th century	A house, later a shop, with a front in sandstone and limestone elsewhere, quoins, an eaves band, a chamfered cornice, and a Welsh slate roof. There are three storeys and three bays. In the centre is a doorway flanked by three-pane shop windows, and a continuous fascia with brackets and dentils. The upper floors contain sash windows.	II
Yew Tree Cottage; 53.21407°N 1.67830°W		Mid to late 18th century	A limestone house with sandstone dressings, quoins on the left, an eaves band and cornice, and a tile roof with a coped gable. There are three storeys, one bay, and a rear lean-to. The doorway and windows have architraves, and the windows in the lower two floors are mullioned.	II
35, 36 and 37 North Church Street; 53.21349°N 1.67866°W		Late 18th century	A terrace of three houses in limestone with sandstone dressings, quoins and a stone slate roof. There are two storeys and four bays. The doorways have broad surrounds, the windows are a mix of casements and sashes, and between the left two cottages is a passageway.	II
1820 Cottage, Spire House, and Hillside Cottage and railings 53.21320°N 1.67713°W		Late 18th century (possible)	A row of three houses on a plinth, in sandstone on the front and limestone on the sides are rear, with quoins, an eaves band, a moulded cornice, and a Welsh slate roof. There are three storeys, Hillside Cottage on the right has a basement, and each house has one bay. The doorways and windows have raised surrounds, and most of the windows are sashes. The doorway of Hillside Cottage is approached by steps, to its right is a shop window, on the landing are iron railings, and under the landing is a basement door.	II
Arkwright Square; 53.21522°N 1.67713°W		Late 18th century	A group of eight workers' cottages in three ranges around a courtyard, they are in limestone with sandstone dressings, quoins, and a slate roof with lead ridges, hipped at the angle. There are two storeys, five bays on Mill Street and three on Buxton Road. The windows are casements, and in the Mill Street range is a segmental archway. Adjoining the cottages is Corner House, taller, with two storeys and three bays, and a tile roof.	II
Burre House; 53.21865°N 1.67543°W		Late 18th century	A sandstone house on a plinth, with bands, an eaves cornice, and a hipped slate roof with lead ridges. The main block has three storeys and a symmetrical front of three bays, flanked by one-bay links to recessed two-storey pavilions. To the right is a screen wall containing a doorway, and at the far left is a two-storey two-bay service wing. The central doorway has a Doric surround, with a semicircular fanlight, an archivolt, and a pediment, and above it are sash windows, the window in the middle floor with a cornice on consoles. The outer bays contain three-storey canted bay windows. In the pavilions there are round-arched windows with impost bands, pedimented gables, and ball finials.	II
Castle Hill Cottage and Farmhouse; 53.21727°N 1.67310°W		Late 18th century (probable)	Two houses in limestone with sandstone dressings, quoins, and a roof of stone slate and tile. There are two storeys and five bays. The doorway of the right house has a triangular-headed surround, and the doorway of the left house has been converted into a French window. The windows are sashes with quoined surrounds.	II
Castle Hill House, stable block and gates 53.21609°N 1.67259°W		Late 18th century	The house is stuccoed, and has chamfered quoins, bands, an eaves cornice, a coped parapet, and a Welsh slate roof. There are three storeys, fronts of five and two bays and a two-bay sandstone wing on the left. In the centre of the main block is a porch that extends to the right as an infilled loggia. It contains a doorway with pilasters and an entablature with a parapet. The windows are sashes, those in the middle bay with moulded architraves and keystones. To the left of the house is a rusticated basket archway containing iron gates, with a casement window above, and a two-storey stable block in sandstone.	II
Gate piers and walls, Castle Hill House; 53.21602°N 1.67315°W	—	Late 18th century	Flanking the entrance to the drive are square sandstone gate piers, each with a moulded plinth, a rusticated shaft, a shallow cornice, an upswept pedestal, and a ball finial. Attached are convex coped walls ending in plainer piers with cornices and pyramidal caps.	II
Church House, attached house and railings 53.21307°N 1.67686°W		Late 18th century	The house is in sandstone with some gritstone, quoins, and a roof of stone slate and tile with coped gables and kneelers. The main house has three storeys and a cellar and two bays. In the left bay is a two-storey canted bay window with a hipped roof. The right bay contains a single-storey bay window and sash windows above. At the rear is a range of two storeys and four bays. The main doorway is approached by steps with decorative iron railings, and it has a moulded stone hood on consoles. The door to the right has a fanlight, and the windows are sashes.	II
Granby House; 53.21305°N 1.67408°W		Late 18th century	A house that was later extended, and divided. It is in sandstone with quoins, sill bands, and a Welsh slate roof. There are three storeys and three bays, and a later two-storey two-bay extension on the left. The original part is symmetrical and has a central round-arched doorway with a fanlight and a dentilled cornice, and the windows are sashes. At the rear is a central porch that has an archivolt with a rusticated keystone, a cornice, and a parapet, and rectangular bay windows.	II
Premises formerly occupied by Jumper; 53.21252°N 1.67641°W		Late 18th century	A house, later a shop, in sandstone, with quoins, an eaves band, a moulded cornice, and a Welsh slate roof. There are three storeys and three bays. In the ground floor is a shop front under a continuous fascia, and a passageway on the right. The middle floor contains sash windows, and in the top floor are casement windows.	II
Facing to bridge over mill stream, Lumford Mill; 53.21793°N 1.68271°W		Late 18th century (probable)	The facing to the bridge crossing the tail race of the mill is in sandstone. It consists of an obtuse-angled wall containing two segmental arches with raised keystones, and a parapet with a band.	II
Mayfield Cottage and Westfield Cottage; 53.21173°N 1.68057°W		Late 18th century	A pair of limestone houses with sandstone dressings and a tile roof. There are three storeys and two bays. The doorways are paired in the centre, and most of the windows are horizontally-sliding casements. In the middle floor of the left bay is a bow window.	II
Melbourne House; 53.21482°N 1.67672°W		Late 18th century	A sandstone house with quoins, and a stone slate roof with coped gables. There are three storeys, a front of two bays, and a rear wing that has been extended. The openings have plain surrounds, and the windows are casements.	II
Rivermeade and wall 53.21550°N 1.67724°W		Late 18th century	A house in gritstone with quoins, and a stone slate roof with coped gables and kneelers. There are two storeys and two bays, a central doorway, and two-light mullioned windows. At the front is a low wall with triangular copings and square gate piers.	II
Rutland Buildings and mounting block 53.21361°N 1.67617°W		Late 18th century	Originally a stable block and coach houses, later used for other purposes, in sandstone with roofs of WSelsh slate, stone slate and tile. The buildings are set around two courtyards with an open end. The central range has two storeys and the others have a single storey. In the central range is a basket arch with an archivolt on an impost string course, round-arched and flat-heaed openings, and a mounting block, and in the upper floor are seven casement windows.	II
The Brooklands, service range and wall 53.21333°N 1.66433°W		Late 18th century	A large house later used for other purposes, it is in sandstone, partly stuccoed, with a plinth, quoins, bands, a cornice and blocking course forming a parapet, and a hipped Welsh slate roof. There are three storeys, fronts of three and five bays, a two-storey, single-bay side wing, and a lower L-shaped service wing. The porch has a chamfered quoined surround and a cornice. Most of the windows are sashes, with some casements, the central window in the middle floor of the garden front with an architrave and a cornice on consoles. Attached to the house is a coped wall with a gateway.	II
The Peacock; 53.21376°N 1.67354°W		Late 18th century	The public house has a front in sandstone, the left return is in limestone, and the right return is roughcast. It has quoins and a stone slate roof. There are two storeys, three bays and rear wings. The ground floor windows are sashes, and in the upper floor are transomed casement windows. The rear wings have hipped roofs and contain sash windows.	II
Two Trees; 53.21191°N 1.68075°W		Late 18th century	A house in limestone with sandstone dressings, quoins, and a tile roof. There are two storeys and an attic, two bays, and a lean-to on the right. The central doorway has a plain surround, and the windows are sashes.	II
Chantry House; 53.21333°N 1.67891°W		c. 1780	The rebuilding of a medieval house, it is in sandstone and limestone, with a roof of Welsh slate and tile. There are two storeys and a cellar, an entrance front of four bays, and three bays in the right return. On the entrance front is a trellised porch. The right return has a plinth, quoins, a chamfered string course, a medieval carving, and a doorway approached by steps. Most of the windows are sashes, and on the entrance front are two-light mullioned windows.	II
Row of shops (north), Matlock Street; 53.21257°N 1.67557°W		c. 1800	A row of shops in sandstone at the front and limestone at the rear, with quoins, and roofs of stone slate and tile. There are three storeys and nine bays. In the third bay is a basket-arched carriage entrance with imposts and iron gates. The ground floor contains shop fronts of different types, and in the upper floors are sash windows.	II
Former Post Office; 53.21313°N 1.67379°W		c. 1800	A pair of mirror-image houses, later shops, in sandstone, with a stone slate roof. There are two storeys and two bays. The doorways are in the centre with bonded surrounds, and the windows are sashes.	II
Victoria Mill; 53.21589°N 1.67765°W		c. 1800	A former corn mill, it is in sandstone on the front and limestone at the rear, on a plinth, with quoins, and a Welsh slate roof. There are three storeys, eight bays, and a two-storey wing at the north end. The windows are casements, and in the right return a millstone has been built into the wall.	II
1–6 Castle Street; 53.21478°N 1.67362°W		Late 18th to early 19th century	A terrace of six houses in sandstone at the front and limestone at the rear, with an eaves band, and stone slate roofs. There are two storeys and 17 bays. The doorways and windows have hood moulds, the doorways have moulded surrounds, and the windows are sashes. One house has a doorway with a stone hood on quatrefoil-pierced brackets, and in the right return is a canted bay window.	II
Wall on west side of Bath Gardens; 53.21375°N 1.67589°W		Late 18th to early 19th century	The wall is in sandstone and is about 3 metres (9.8 ft) high. It contains quoins, a band, and plain copings, and there is a pedestrian gateway.	II
Beech Cottage; 53.21501°N 1.67442°W		Late 18th to early 19th century	A house and outbuilding, later combined, the building is in mixed limestone and sandstone, with quoins, and a stone slate roof. There are two storeys and six bays, and a single-storey wing on the front at the right. The windows in the main part are sashes, and in the wing is a casement window.	II
Bridge over mill tailrace and obelisk 53.21579°N 1.67720°W		Late 18th to early 19th century	The bridge carries a road over a mill tailrace, and is in gritstone with limestone spandrels. It consists of a shallow segmental arch with a parapet on the downstream side. The parapet has a cambered band, and at the south end is a stepped obelisk.	II
Brocklehurst's; 53.21406°N 1.67357°W		Late 18th to early 19th century	A shop in sandstone with quoins, a stone slate roof, two storeys and five bays. In the ground floor are three segmental arches with voussoirs and keystones infilled with shop windows. The doorway has a plain surround, and the windows are sashes. Internally, the right wall contains a 16th-century cruck truss.	II
Garden wall to east of Butts House; 53.21215°N 1.67760°W	—	18th or early 19th century	The wall, which has an L-shape, is in sandstone with copings, and forms the north and east boundaries of the garden. It contains an infilled 18th-century doorway with a flat arch and voussoirs, and a blocked round-arched doorway with imposts.	II
Jasmine Cottage, Green Lea, Bryn Cott, Claverley House and wall 53.21328°N 1.67781°W		Late 18th to early 19th century	A terrace of four sandstone houses, with quoins and a stone slate roof. There are three storeys, and each house has one bay. The doorways are paired, and over the left doorway is a canopy. The windows are a mix of sashes and casements, and in the right house is a canted bay window. Along the front of the gardens are stone coped wall and round-headed gate piers.	II
Lumford Mill (original building); 53.21768°N 1.68338°W		Late 18th to early 19th century	Part of a cotton mill, later offices, it is in sandstone with quoins, sill bands, and a Welsh slate roof. There are three storeys and eight bays. The windows are 20th-century casements.	II
Steps, railings and walls, Mayfield Cottage and Westfield Cottage; 53.21177°N 1.68048°W		Late 18th to early 19th century	The retaining walls at the front of the gardens are in limestone, and are coped. Steps lead up to the paired central doorways, divided by an iron handrail with a scrolled end. On the walls are spiked railings between standards with vase finials.	II
Milford Bridge; 53.21539°N 1.67430°W		Late 18th to early 19th century	The bridge carries Castle Street over the canalised tailrace from Victoria Mill. It is in sandstone with limestone in the spandrels. The bridge is hump-backed, and consists of a single segmental arch with a peaked band, and a parapet ending in round-headed piers.	II
Rutland House; 53.21375°N 1.67633°W		Late 18th to early 19th century	The house is in sandstone on the front and in limestone elsewhere, with quoins, and a roof of Welsh slate, stone slate, and tile with coped gables and kneelers. There are three storeys, a symmetrical front of three bays, a rear wing on the left and a single-storey wing beyond. The central doorway has a moulded architrave and a cornice, and the windows are sashes, those in the ground floor with mullions.	II
The Queens Arm's Hotel; 53.21395°N 1.67379°W		Late 18th to early 19th century	The public house, on a corner site, incorporates 16th-century material. It is in sandstone, with quoins, and roofs of stone slate and tile, hipped on the corner. There are two storeys, four bays on Bridge Street and five on Market Street. The doorways have plain surrounds, and the windows are sashes. Inside, there is a partly exposed cruck truss.	II
Garden wall, Wye Cottage and Granby Cottage; 53.21315°N 1.67456°W	—	18th or 19th century	The wall is in limestone with sandstone coping. It is curved in front of Granby Cottage, and along Water Street is a taller section containing two openings with quoined surrounds.	II
Rutland Arms Hotel; 53.21295°N 1.67603°W		1804	The hotel is in sandstone, with quoins, a floor band, a moulded eaves cornice and a hipped Welsh slate roof. There are three storeys, a main block of five bays with a recessed bay on the right, four bays in the left return, and a later single-storey three-bay range on the right. In the centre is a porch with Doric columns, an entablature and the coat of arms of the Duke of Rutland. The windows are sashes with grooved wedge lintels.	II
Eastern part, Aldern House; 53.22149°N 1.67243°W		c. 1820	A house, later used for other purposes, it is in sandstone, on a plinth, with quoins, a lintel band, an eaves cornice, a balustraded parapet, and a Welsh slate roof. There are two storeys, a symmetrical front of three bays, and a rear wing. Steps lead up to a central Doric porch with an entablature, and an outer door with an architrave and a cornice. Flanking the porch are canted bay windows, and in the upper floor are sash windows.	II
1, 2 and 3 Bagshaw Hill; 53.21517°N 1.67750°W		Early 19th century	A row of three houses in gritstone, angled on the right corner and corbelled out below the top floor, and a Welsh slate roof, hipped on the right. The houses are in two and three storeys, and have four bays. The left house has a trellised wooden porch, the middle house has a canopy, and the windows are sashes.	II
1 Butts View and Butts Cottage; 53.21241°N 1.67831°W		Early 19th century	A row of three sandstone houses with a hipped slate roof. There are two storeys, five bays on the front and one on the right return. On the front are doorways and a carriage entrance. There is one three-light mullioned window, and the other windows are sashes.	II
Row of shops (south), Matlock Street; 53.21204°N 1.67480°W		Early 19th century	The shops are in sandstone with some limestone at the rear, with quoins, a moulded eaves cornice, and a Welsh slate roof. There are three storeys, eight bays, and a rear wing. In the ground floor are shop fronts and a passage entry, and the upper floors contain sash and casement windows.	II
25 and 26 North Church Street; 53.21329°N 1.67793°W		Early 19th century	A pair of houses in a terrace, in sandstone with quoins and a tile roof. There are three storeys and each house has one bay. The doorway of the right house is in the ground floor, and that of the left house is in the middle floor and approached by steps. The windows are sashes in the lower two floors and casements in the top floor. In front of the gardens are coped walls and gate piers with rounded tops. The right wall is low, and the wall on the left ramps up beside the steps.	II
Belvoir Cottage; 53.21215°N 1.67680°W		Early 19th century	A gritstone house with quoins on the left and a Welsh slate roof. There are two storeys and two bays. The central doorway has a bonded surround, to its left is a former shop window, and the other windows are sashes.	II
Bridge House and Bridgeway; 53.21414°N 1.67332°W		Early 19th century	A large house later divided and used for other purposes. It is in sandstone with sill bands, an eaves cornice, a parapet, and a stone slate roof with coped gables. There are three storeys, a double depth plan, five bays, and on the left is a semi-octagonal projection with an embattled parapet. The door on the left has a fanlight in an architrave and a cornice on consoles, the door on the right is simpler, and the windows are sashes. Most of the openings have hood moulds.	II
Butts Cottage and Woodside Cottage; 53.21111°N 1.67751°W		Early 19th century	A pair of houses in sandstone at the front and limestone at the rear, with chamfered rusticated quoins and a red tile roof. There are two storeys and six bays. In the fourth bay is a recessed panel with a round head on corbels. The doorways have moulded imposts, a plain lintel and a cornice, and most of the windows are sashes.	II
Garden wall and gate piers, Butts Cottage and Woodside Cottage; 53.21110°N 1.67728°W	—	Early 19th century	The wall is in limestone with rounded gritstone coping and is about 1.7 metres (5 ft 7 in) high. The curved wall links pairs of rectangular gate piers with rounded tops.	II
Butts View; 53.21227°N 1.67833°W		Early 19th century	A sandstone house in a row, with quoins, an eaves band, and a Welsh slate roof with coped gables. There are two storeys and a symmetrical front of three bays. The central doorway has a pediment on shaped brackets. Above the doorway is a two-light casement window, and the other windows are sashes.	II
Church Cottage; 53.21323°N 1.67754°W		Early 19th century	The house is in sandstone at the front and mixed sandstone and limestone elsewhere, it has quoins on the left, and a tile roof. There are two storeys and three bays. On the front is a doorway and sash windows.	II
Church View; 53.21243°N 1.67802°W		Early 19th century	A pair of mirror-image houses in sandstone, with a sill band, and a Welsh slate roof with coped gables and shaped kneelers. There are three storeys and three bays. The paired doorways in the centre have ornamental pilasters, semicircular traceried fanlights, archivolts, and keystones, and the windows are sashes.	II
Premises formerley occupied by Derbyshire Building Society; 53.21268°N 1.67571°W		Early 19th century	A shop/office with living accommodation above, it is in sandstone with end pilasters, a sill band, an eaves band, a parapet, and a tile roof. There are three storeys and three bays. In the ground floor is a modern shop front, and the upper floors contain sash windows.	II
Green Cowden Farmhouse; 53.20761°N 1.70802°W		Early 19th century	The farmhouse is in limestone with sandstone dressings, on a chamfered plinth, with quoins, and a stone slate roof with coped gables and shaped kneelers. It is in Tudor Revival style, and has three storeys and an L-shaped plan, consisting of a front range of three bays, the left bay gabled, and a rear range of five bays. Steps lead to the central doorway that has a moulded surround, a Tudor arched head, and a hood mould. The windows on the front are casements with chamfered surrounds, lights with pointed heads, and hood moulds, and on the side they are mullioned with triangular-headed lights. Attached to a chimney stack is a bellcote.	II
Stable building, Holme Grange; 53.21771°N 1.67777°W		Early 19th century	A cart house and stable in limestone with sandstone dressings and a stone slate roof. There is a single storey and two bays. In the left bay is a cart entrance with a quoined surround, and the right bay contains a stable door with a triangular head, and casement windows with deep lintels.	II
Milestone; 53.21683°N 1.67908°W		Early 19th century	The milestone on the southwest side of Buxton Road (A6 road) is in sandstone. It has a triangular section and a sloping top inscribed with the distance to London. On the sides are the distances to Manchester, Buxton, Bakewell, Matlock and Derby.	II
Milford Court; 53.21533°N 1.67732°W		Early 19th century	A terrace of seven houses in sandstone on the front and right return, and in mixed limestone, sandstone and some brick at the rear. The houses are on a plinth, and have chamfered quoins on the right, a floor band, an eaves band and cornice, and a Welsh slate roof. There are three storeys, six bays on the front and a gabled two-bay rear wing on the right. The windows are sashes, and at the rear is a brick stair turret.	II
Wall and gate piers, Milford House; 53.21555°N 1.67627°W		Early 19th century (probable)	The garden wall is in limestone and sandstone, with brick facing and triangular copings, and is about 75 metres (246 ft) long. At the west end are inner and outer gate piers. The outer piers have plinths, square shafts with punched panels, and pyramidal caps. The inner piers are more elaborate, and have caps with gablets and small ball finials.	II
Mill Cottage and Ford Cottage; 53.21561°N 1.67747°W		Early 19th century	A pair of houses on a corner site in sandstone with a Welsh slate roof. There are two storeys, each house has one bay, and the left corner is angled at the rear. The doorways are in the inner parts of each bay, and the windows are horizontally-sliding sashes.	II
Railings and gate, Rutland House; 53.21377°N 1.67643°W		Early 19th century	Running along the front of the house are iron railings on a stone plinth. In the centre is a gate flanked by square iron openwork standards.	II
Rutland Terrace and Regency House; 53.21366°N 1.67669°W		Early 19th century	A terrace of houses, later flats, in sandstone at the front and limestone at the rear, on a plinth, with an eaves band, a cornice and blocking course, and a Welsh slate roof with coped gables. There are three storeys, each house has three bays, and between the bays and on the corners are pilasters with moulded capitals. Each house has a central doorway with a moulded surround, a fanlight, and a cornice on shaped brackets, and the windows are sashes.	II
Wall, railings and gates, Rutland Terrace; 53.21368°N 1.67659°W		Early 19th century	The wall running along the front of the gardens is in gritstone, and has moulded copings and end piers. The railings and gates are in iron, they have barbed finials, and the standards have vase finials.	II
Saxby; 53.21369°N 1.67632°W		Early 19th century	The house has a limestone front, quoins, an eaves band carried across a coped gable that has quoined upstands. There are three storeys and two bays. The windows are sashes, and the doorway is in the right return.	II
Railings and gate, Saxby; 53.21368°N 1.67641°W		Early 19th century	Running along the front of the house and in the left return are iron railings on a stone plinth, and on the right is a gate.	II
Spring Cottage; 53.21219°N 1.67829°W		Early 19th century	A sandstone house with quoins, an eaves band, and a Welsh slate roof. There are two storeys and a symmetrical front of three bays. The central doorway has a pediment on shaped brackets, and the windows are mullioned with two lights.	II
Garden wall, Spring Cottage; 53.21193°N 1.67830°W	—	Early 19th century (probable)	The garden wall attached to Spring Cottage is in limestone with rounded sandstone copings. Near the house is a pedestrian gateway spanned by flat coping.	II
Stile between the bridge over Mill Tailrace and Milford House; 53.21567°N 1.67701°W	—	Early 19th century (probable)	The stile consists of a pair of gritstone columns in a limestone wall with gritstone copings.	II
The Beeches; 53.21157°N 1.67478°W		Early 19th century	A sandstone house in Gothick style, with quoins, projecting eaves on shaped brackets, and a hipped Welsh slate roof. There are two storeys and a symmetrical front of three bays, the middle bay projecting slightly. All the openings have pointed heads and hood moulds, the central doorway has a fanlight, and the windows are sashes.	II
Gate piers and wall, The Beeches; 53.21174°N 1.67448°W	—	Early 19th century	The wall is in sandstone backed by limestone and is coped. It extends along Matlock Street, with a doorway at the north end, and at the south end quadrant walls lead to the entrance to the drive. This flanked by square gate piers with pyramidal caps.	II
Gateway and walls, The Brooklands; 53.21351°N 1.66509°W		Early 19th century	The garden wall is in sandstone, it is coped, and contains a pedestrian entrance near the house. The main entrance has iron gates, and is flanked by square tapering piers with domed caps.	II
The Limes; 53.21334°N 1.67830°W		Early 19th century	The house is in sandstone on the front and limestone elsewhere, and has quoins and a stone slate roof. There are three storeys and a symmetrical front of two bays. The doorway is in the centre, the windows on the front are sashes, and in the right return is a casement window.	II
Wall and gate piers, The Limes; 53.21330°N 1.67832°W	—	Early 19th century	In front of the garden is a sandstone wall with coping. At the entrance to the garden are rectangular gate piers with rounded tops.	II
Victoria Cottages; 53.21580°N 1.67794°W		Early 19th century	A row of eight houses in sandstone with roofs of stone slate and tile. There are two storeys, and most houses have a single bay. Most of the doorways have plain surrounds, and two have bonded surrounds. Some windows are casements, and most are sashes.	II
Sluice and waterwheel, Victoria Mill; 53.21586°N 1.67751°W		Early 19th century	The sluice at the rear of the mill is in gritstone, it is rectangular, and the axle mountings and spur wheel have survived. Adjacent is a waterwheel dating from about 1850, in cast iron with forged elements. It has eight spokes, and is about 4 metres (13 ft) wide and 5 metres (16 ft) in diameter.	II
Garden Wall, Yew Tree Cottage; 53.21403°N 1.67845°W		Early 19th century (probable)	The garden wall is in limestone with sandstone copings. It is about 2 metres (6 ft 7 in) high, and extends for about 13 metres (43 ft), containing a gateway with a quoined surround.	II
Riversdale; 53.21462°N 1.67378°W		c. 1830–40	A sandstone house in Tudor Revival style, with an eaves band, and a stone slate roof. There are two storeys and four bays. The doorway and the windows, which are sashes, have hood moulds. To the left of the doorway is a foot scraper recess.	II
The Castle Inn; 53.21439°N 1.67364°W		c. 1830–40	The public house is in sandstone with quoins and a roof of Welsh slate and stone slate. There are two storeys, a symmetrical front of three bays, twin rear wings, an angled single-storey wing on the left, and an attached two-storey outbuilding. The central doorway has a fanlight, and a hood mould, and it is flanked by canted bay windows. In the upper floor are sash windows with hood moulds.	II
Building in garden of Coombs Hay; 53.21710°N 1.67175°W		1831	The building, which was a water supply pump or filter house, is in sandstone with a roof of corrugated sheeting. It has a single storey and a rectangular plan, and has a moulded cornice and a parapet. The building contains a doorway with a basket-arched head, above which is an oval date panel, and in the upper part of each side is a square window.	II
Wall to rear of 1–6 Castle Street; 53.21488°N 1.67334°W	—	Early to mid 19th century	The wall enclosing the gardens is in limestone with sandstone dressings and is 1.75 metres (5 ft 9 in) or more in height. The front section has triangular copings, and contains doorways with moulded surrounds and Tudor arched heads. The rear section overlooks the River Wye, and contains triangular-headed gateways.	II
Former premises of Bakewell Antiques; 53.21263°N 1.67615°W		Early to mid 19th century	A shop in sandstone with an eaves band and cornice, a parapet, and a Welsh slate roof with coped gables. There are two storeys and a front of five bays, the right two bays narrower and recessed. In the left three bays is a shop front under a continuous fascia. The other bays contain a carriage entrance that has a basket arch with faceted imposts and a keystone with a cornice.	II
Bluebell Cottage; 53.21732°N 1.68568°W		Early to mid 19th century	The house is in limestone with sandstone dressings, on a plinth, with quoins and a stone slate roof. There are two storeys, two bays, and a recessed later wing on the left. The doorway has a broad surround and a hood mould, and the windows are horizontally-sliding sashes, with a hood mould in the ground floor.	II
Greenlands; 53.21740°N 1.68620°W		Early to mid 19th century	A limestone house with sandstone dressings, on a plinth, with quoins and a tile roof. There are two storeys, a single bay, an outbuilding on the right, and a rear wing. The doorway has a hood mould, and the windows are horizontally-sliding sashes, the ground floor window with a hood mould.	II
Holly House and Cottage; 53.21250°N 1.67884°W		Early to mid 19th century	The house is in sandstone with quoins, an eaves band, and a hipped tile roof. There are two storeys, two bays, and a single-storey single-bay extension on the left. The doorway has an architrave and a moulded cornice, and the windows are sashes in architraves.	II
Bridge at Lumford Mill; 53.21757°N 1.68299°W		Early to mid 19th century	The bridge carries a road over the River Wye. It is in sandstone, and consists of three segmental arches, the middle arch the largest. The bridge has voussoirs, (keystones, coped parapets, and square end piers with pyramidal caps.	II
Sheepwash enclosure 53.21732°N 1.67936°W		Early to mid 19th century	The enclosure for washing sheep near Holme Bridge has an irregular D-shape, and is enclosed by limestone walls about 1.5 metres (4 ft 11 in) high and 13 metres (43 ft) long. At the west and east ends are gate openings, the latter with gritstone piers, and on the south wall is an opening with access to the mill stream.	II
Shops at the corner of Matlock Street and King Street; 53.21276°N 1.67586°W		Early to mid 19th century	A group of shops on a corner site in sandstone, with a sill band, an eaves band and cornice, and a Welsh slate roof with coped gables. There are three storeys, two bays on Matlock Street, three on King Street, and a curved bay on the corner. In the ground floor are shop fronts, and on King Street is a doorway with a fanlight and a moulded cornice on consoles. The upper floors contain sash windows.	II
Garden walls with potting sheds, The Brooklands; 53.21371°N 1.66485°W		Early to mid 19th century	The kitchen garden walls enclose three sides of the garden, and are in sandstone and red brick, backed by mixed limestone and sandstone, and the potting shed roofs are in stone slate. The south the wall is serpentine, about 1.7 metres (5 ft 7 in) high, with round coping, and a gate with round-headed piers. On the other sides the walls are about 3 metres (9.8 ft) high, and on the north side are lean-to sheds. These have an open-fronted bay in the centre, and to the right is glazing above a plinth wall.	II
The Chimneys; 53.21412°N 1.67670°W		Early to mid 19th century	A shop on a corner site, it is in sandstone, with quoins, a sill band, and a hipped Welsh slate roof. There are three storeys and an L-shaped plan, with two bays on the front, and two bays in the left return. On the front is a shop front in the left bay, and a segmental archway in the right bay. Above the arch is a canted bay window, in the ground floor of the left return is a shop window, and the other windows are sashes.	II
The Old Kings; 53.21460°N 1.67675°W		Early to mid 19th century	A public house, later used for other purposes, it is in sandstone with quoins, and a roof of Walsh slate and tiles at the rear. There are two storeys, two bays, and rear wing on the left. The right bay contains a carriage entrance with a quoined surround, and a wooden lintel on corbels. In the passageway is a doorway with an architrave, and the windows are a mix of sashes and casements.	II
Former Royal Bank of Scotland; 53.21343°N 1.67524°W		1837–39	The former bank is in sandstone, and in Classical style. There are two storeys and fronts of three bays, the middle bay at the front recessed, and with chamfered quoins flanking the outer bays. Steps lead up to the central doorway that has an architrave, and a modillion cornice on scrolled consoles. The windows are sashes in architraves, those in the ground floor also with pulvinated friezes and cornices. The front has a full entablature, and a frieze inscribed with "BANK", and with consoles between the letters. At the top is a parapet with recessed panels, and at the rear is a screen wall with two segmental arches.	II
Main building, Newholme Hospital; 53.21884°N 1.67244°W		1839–41	Originally a workhouse, and later altered and extended, it is in limestone with sandstone dressings on a chamfered plinth, with quoins, and a slate roof with coped gables and shaped kneelers. It is in Jacobean style, and has two storeys, a symmetrical front of seven bays, and single-bay side wings. The outer and middle bays are gabled, the middle bay with a clock face. The central doorway has a Tudor arched surround and a stepped hood mould. The windows are mullioned or mullioned and transomed, and in the outer bays are two-storey canted bay windows.	II
Haddon House Farmhouse, outbuildings and gateways 53.20347°N 1.66652°W		c. 1840	The buildings are in sandstone and limestone with Welsh slate roofs. They form a U-shaped group that contains a house with two storeys and an attic, and four bays, and an attached stable with one storey and a loft and three bays. On the south side is an outbuilding with one storey and four bays, which is linked to the other range by an archway. The house has quoins, in the ground floor is a segmental-arched carriage house, two stable doorways with quoined surrounds and casement windows, and above is living accommodation. The gables have moulded and chamfered copings, and in the attic are two gabled dormers.	II
Porter's Lodge, Newholme Hospital; 53.21925°N 1.67258°W		c. 1841	The lodge is in limestone with sandstone dressings, quoins, and a tile roof with coped gables and shaped kneelers. There is a single storey and a rectangular plan. The doorway has a chamfered surround, and the windows have single lights or are mullioned.	II
Ancillary building, Newholme Hospital; 53.21858°N 1.67299°W		c. 1841	The building is in limestone with sandstone dressings, quoins, and a twin tile roof with coped gables and shaped kneelers. There is a single storey, and the openings have chamfered surrounds. The windows are casements.	II
West Lodge, Holme Hall; 53.21819°N 1.67602°W		1841	The former lodge, which is in Tudor Revival style, is in limestone with sandstone dressings, on a chamfered plinth, with quoins, and a slate roof with ridge tiles, chamfered gable copings and shaped finials. There is a single storey and an attic, and a T-shaped plan. The entrance front is gabled and contains an open porch with a moulded Tudor arch, and a doorway with a dated lintel. In the left return is a canted bay window.	II
Burton Closes; 53.20557°N 1.67113°W		c. 1845–48	A country house that was extended in about 1856–58 and in 1888, and later altered and converted into a nursing home. It is in sandstone on moulded plinths, with a string course, and slate roofs with lead ridges. There are two storeys and attics, and it has a U-shaped plan. The entrance front has five bays, and contains a porch with a Tudor arched entrance, and an embattled parapet with octagonal pinnacles. The garden front has four bays, and contains a canted bay window and a canted oriel window. At the south is a range of five bays, including an octagonal turret, two two-storey bay windows, an oriel window, and a single-storey bay window with pierced parapet.	II*
Former Trustees Savings Bank; 53.21412°N 1.67542°W		1848	The former bank is in sandstone on a plinth, with corniced pilasters at the corners and between the bays, an entablature with an inscribed and dated frieze, a moulded cornice and blocking course, and a hipped Welsh slate roof with rolled lead ridges. There is a single storey and a front of three bays. The central doorway has pilasters, a moulded architrave, and a plain entablature. In the outer bays are sash windows with moulded architraves.	II
English Martyrs Church; 53.21450°N 1.67661°W		1849	The church is in sandstone with limestone at the rear, and has a slate roof with moulded gable copings and shaped kneelers. It consists of a single cell over a schoolroom, and has five bays, the left bay gabled and projecting, and containing a pointed doorway approached by steps. The windows are lancets, and between them and at the corners are gabled pilasters. At the ritual east end is a triple lancet window, above which is a gable with a finial.	II
Walls, north entrances and railings, All Saints' Church; 53.21324°N 1.67830°W	—	19th century	The wall running along the north side of the churchyard is in limestone with gritstone copings, and the gate piers are in sandstone. At the northeast entrance are steps flanked by walls and square rounded piers, with a bollard with a shaped head at the top. The northwest entrance has a paved approach with a bollard at the entry, railings on the east side, and a gate with square piers at the top.	II
Walls, south entrance and steps, All Saints' Church; 53.21263°N 1.67816°W	—	19th century	The wall running along the south side of the churchyard is in limestone and sandstone, and the steps and piers are in sandstone. Th emain entrance has steps and walls at two levels.	II
Bagshaw's Offices; 53.21380°N 1.67435°W		Mid 19th century	A house, later offices, in sandstone, with quoins, floor bands, and a Welsh slate roof. There are three storeys and three bays. In the ground floor is a 20th-century shop front with a recessed central doorway and a continuous fascia, and the upper floors contain sash windows.	II
Main gateway and walls, Burre House; 53.21840°N 1.67373°W		Mid 19th century	Flanking the entrance are square gate piers with moulded plinths, panelled shafts, cornices, upswept pedestals, and ball finials. The wooden gate is decorative, with ovals and slatwork. Attached to the piers are serpentine sandstone walls with chamfered copings and similar end piers.	II
Gateway and wall, Haddon House; 53.20375°N 1.66515°W		Mid 19th century	The walls are in sandstone backed by limestone. Flanking the entrance to the drive are square gate [piers with plinths, and gabled caps with moulded ridges. Attached are concave walls with moulded copings leading to similar piers. Outside these are wing walls with triangular copings, extending for about 10 metres (33 ft).	II
Gate piers and walls to lodges, Holme Hall; 53.21814°N 1.67595°W		Mid 19th century	Flanking the entrance to the drive are square gate [piers, each of which has a chamfered plinth, sunken panels on the shafts, bands, and ogee caps with ball finials. Attached to the piers are quadrant walls in limestone with sandstone round-edged triangular copings, the left wall ending in a pier.	II
Gate piers and gate, Main Avenue, Holme Hall; 53.21869°N 1.67785°W	—	Mid 19th century	The gate piers are in sandstone, and each pier has a moulded plinth, a plain shaft, an overhanging cornice, a depressed ogee pedestal, and a large ball finial. Between them is a wooden gate.	II
Wall and gate piers, Holme Hall; 53.21824°N 1.67873°W	—	Mid 19th century	The wall is in limestone and the gate piers are in sandstone. The wall is coped, it is about 1.8 metres (5 ft 11 in) high, and extends for about 40 metres (130 ft). At the south end is a carriage entrance with square piers that have slight cornices, upswept pedestals and ball finials. The wall also contains earlier gate piers that have decorated sunken panels, cornices and ball finials.	II
Railings and garden wall, Ivy House; 53.21237°N 1.67745°W	—	19th century (probable)	Along the front of the house are iron railings on a stone plinth, containing a gate. On the east side of the garden is a screen wall in sandstone and limestone with rounded copings, about 2 metres (6 ft 7 in) high and 12 metres (39 ft) long, containing a vehicle entrance with a quoined surround. It sweeps round to the south, where is it about 3 metres (9.8 ft) high.	II
Row of shops (central), Matlock Street; 53.21224°N 1.67512°W		Mid 19th century	A row of shops in sandstone at the front and limestone at the rear, with a sill band, an eaves band, and a Welsh slate roof. There are three storeys, eight bays, and a two-storey single-bay extension on the left. In the ground floor are shop fronts, and a carriage entrance with a cambered lintel, and the upper floors contain sash windows.	II
Nurses' Home, Newholme Hospital; 53.21871°N 1.67187°W		Mid 19th century	The former nurses' home is in limestone with sandstone dressings, on a chamfered plinth, with quoins, and a Welsh slate roof with coped gables and shaped kneelers. There are two storeys and an H-shaped plan, with six bays, the outer two bays at each end projecting and gabled. The central doorway has a hood on shaped brackets, and the windows are casements. On the right return is a gabled porch.	II
Office, Newholme Hospital; 53.21858°N 1.67328°W		19th century	Originally the porters' lodge and sewing room of a workhouse, it is in limestone with sandstone dressings, on a chamfered plinth, with quoins, and a slate roof with moulded gable copings and shaped kneelers. There is an L-shaped plan, consisting of a two-storey block and a single-storey wing. The windows are mullioned and transomed with small-pane casements.	II
Gateway, gate piers and wall, Trustee Savings Bank; 53.21408°N 1.67547°W	—	Mid 19th century	Running along the front of the bank is a sandstone plinth wall, containing iron gates that have iron standards with urn finials. At the ends of the wall are square sandstone piers with cornices and shallow pyramidal caps.	II
Friends' Meeting House; 53.21099°N 1.67545°W		1852	The meeting house is in sandstone, on a plinth, with a hipped Welsh slate roof. There is a single storey, and ranges of two and three bays. On the front is a porch with pilasters and a pedimented wooden gable. The windows have wedge lintels, the central one inscribed with the date. At the rear are lean-tos, and in the right return are casement windows.	II
Burton Closes Mews; 53.20410°N 1.67464°W		c. 1856–58	The former stables and coach house to Burton Closes have been converted for domestic use, and are in sandstone with blue tile roofs enclosing a courtyard. The east range contains an arched entrance, over which is a clock tower with angle buttresses, a corbel table, and a pyramidal spire with lucarnes and a weathervane. In the west range is an archway with a crow-stepped gable and a finial. Elsewhere, there are arched doorways, casement windows, and dormers.	II
Bakewell railway station 53.21748°N 1.66811°W		1861–62	The railway station was built for the Midland Railway, and has since been converted for other uses. It is in sandstone, with a lintel band, overhanging eaves on shaped brackets, and a hipped Welsh slate roof. There is a single storey, and a symmetrical front of eleven bays. In the centre is a gabled open porch on ornamental cast iron columns with a decorative frieze, and a doorway flanked by windows, all with segmental heads. The other bays contain windows with flat heads; all the windows are sashes. On the platform side is an arcade of blind segmental arches containing doorways and windows, under a shallow canted parapet.	II
East platform wall, Bakewell railway station 53.21760°N 1.66786°W		1861–62	The eastern platform wall of the former railway station was built for the Midland Railway. It is in sandstone and consists of an arcade of six blind arches, with a coped parapet that slopes down at the ends. The arches have moulded segmental heads, between the bays are pilasters, and a band runs along the wall. In the second bay is a doorway, and the fourth bay contains a door and a window.	II
Railway bridge 53.20766°N 1.65632°W		1862	The bridge was built by the Midland Railway to carry its line over a road in Monsal Dale, now part of the Monsal Trail. It is in sandstone with brick soffits, and consists of three segmental skew arches. The bridge has tapering piers, impost bands, and a band under the parapet, which is coped and ends in rectangular piers.	II
Elliottholme Lodge; 53.20314°N 1.65713°W		c. 1865	The lodge is in limestone and sandstone, with quoins, and a stone slate roof with coped gables and shaped kneelers. There is one storey and an attic, and an L-shaped plan with a gabled side wing. It contains chamfered mullioned windows with hood moulds, and a doorway with a triangular-headed surround and a hood mould.	II
Former blacksmith's workshop 53.21193°N 1.68100°W	—	Mid to late 19th century	The former smithy is in limestone with alterations in brick, and has a roof of slate at the front and tile at the rear. There is a single storey, and it consists of a single room with an L-shaped space at the rear, and the rear is built into the hillside. On the front is a sliding door and a casement window.	II
Terrace walls, steps and gates, Burton Closes; 53.20535°N 1.67137°W		Mid to late 19th century	To the south and east of the house are terrace retaining walls in sandstone with moulded copings. The south range extends for about 60 metres (200 ft) and the east range for about 45 metres (148 ft). In the south range are three openings with steps to the lower terrace. At the north end of the east range are 19 steps with ramped side walls. At the top is a balustrade with ten Tudor arched openings, and at the bottom is an iron gate.	II
The Old Vicarage; 53.21197°N 1.67985°W		1868–69	The vicarage, later used for other purposes, was designed by Alfred Waterhouse in Gothic Revival style. It is in limestone with sandstone dressings on a chamfered plinth, and has a red tile roof. There are two storeys, a cellar and attic, and a U-shaped plan, consisting of a double-depth centre and gabled cross-wings. The entrance front has five bays, the outer bays projecting and gabled. In the right angle is a porch with a pointed arch and a hood mould, and above it is a triple lancet stair window. Also on the front are sash windows and a gabled dormer with a quatrefoil. On the right return is a rectangular bay window.	II
Roadside wall and gateways, The Old Vicarage; 53.21210°N 1.68017°W		c. 1869	The wall is in limestone with chamfered sandstone copings, and is about 2 metres (6 ft 7 in) high. It is partly a retaining wall, and partly free-standing. There are two pairs of sandstone gate piers, and the iron gates have finialled dog bars and scrollwork.	II
Former coal merchant's office, Bakewell railway station 53.21712°N 1.66864°W		c. 1870	The building is in sandstone with dentilled eaves and a hipped Welsh slate roof. There is a single storey and six bays. On the front are two doorways and four sash windows, all with segmental-arched heads.	II
Drinking fountain 53.21480°N 1.67216°W		c. 1870	The drinking fountain on an island in the centre of a road junction is in sandstone on a gritstone plinth, and has a triangular plan. Around the base are diagonal buttresses with gablets, and semi-circular basins on columnar shafts under gables with ball flower ornament. A spire rises from the centre, surmounted by a ball finial and a later lamp.	II
The Vicarage Cottage and wall 53.21195°N 1.67901°W	—	c. 1870	Originally outbuildings to the Old Vicarage that were later combined into a house. It is in limestone with a red tile roof and crested ridges, and is mainly in a single storey with attics, and has an irregular plan. The windows vary, and include sashes, casements and circular windows. There is a triangular bay window, and gabled dormers and half-dormers. Across the stable yard is a wall with square gate piers in limestone and sandstone that have chamfered caps and ball finials.	II
National Westminster Bank; 53.21342°N 1.67454°W		Late 19th century	The bank is in sandstone on a chamfered plinth, with quoins, sill and lintel bands, a moulded eaves cornice, and a tile roof with coped gables, kneelers and a finial. There are two storeys and an attic, and a front of five bays, the outer bays gabled. The doorway has a Tudor arched head, a hood mould, and a finial. Most of the windows are mullioned and transomed, and in the right return is an oriel window on corbels, with a hipped roof and a finial.	II
War memorial 53.21307°N 1.67569°W		c. 1920	The war memorial stands on an island in the centre of a road junction. It consists of a cross in sandstone on a base of three square steps. There is a square pedestal with a moulded plinth and corner pilasters. The shaft is tapered and becomes hexagonal with the cross on the top. On the pedestal are plaques with the names of those lost in the First World War.	II
Two telephone kiosks 53.21320°N 1.67658°W		1935	The two K6 type telephone kiosks on the corner of Buxton Road and North Church Street were designed by Giles Gilbert Scott. Constructed in cast iron with a square plan and a dome, they have three unperforated crowns in the top panels.	II
