= Bakewell Town Hall =

Municipal building in Bakewell, Derbyshire, England

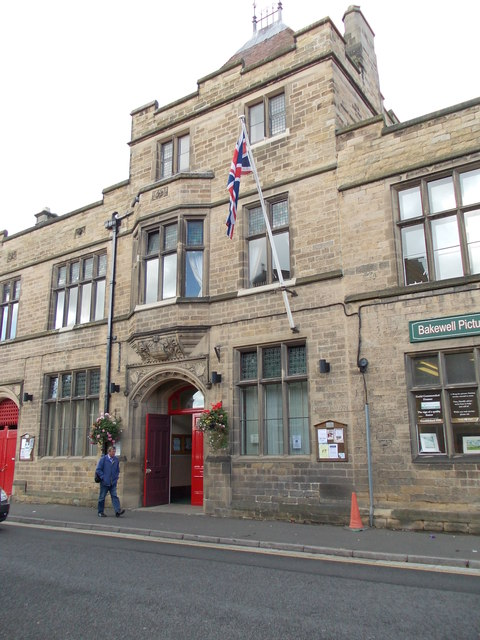
- The building in 2012

- Shown in Derbyshire
- 53.2138°N 1.6750°W
- Location: Anchor Street, Bakewell

History
- Built: 1890

Site notes
- Architectural style: Gothic Revival style

Bakewell Town Hall is a municipal building in Anchor Street in Bakewell, a town in Derbyshire in England. The building, which serves a community events venue, is also the home of Bakewell Town Council.

== History ==
The first town hall in Bakewell was the old town hall in King Street which dated back to the early 17th century. In 1827, petty session hearings and other municipal activities moved to Bakewell Market Hall in Bridge Street.

By the late 19th century, the local board of health considered the market hall inadequate. In 1889, the local freemasons decided to commission a new masonic hall, and funds were raised for that purpose. However, members of the local board of health, led by Andreas Edward Cokayne, who was also an antiquary and a freemason, persuaded the original proposers of the masonic hall that the new building should also serve as a municipal building. A new company, the Bakewell Town Hall Company, was formed to finance and commission the building. The site they selected was at the junction of Anchor Square and Bath Street.

The new building was designed by George E. Statham in the Gothic Revival style, built by J. Walker & Son of Wirksworth in ashlar stone at a cost of £6,000 and was opened by the John Manners, 7th Duke of Rutland on 18 September 1890. The design involved an asymmetrical main frontage of four bays facing onto Anchor Street. The left-hand section of two bays was two storeys high and was surmounted by a parapet. The first bay featured a round headed opening with an archivolt and a square headed hood mould, and was fenestrated by a cross-window on the first floor, while the second bay was fenestrated with mullioned and transomed windows on both floors. The right-hand section of two bays featured an extra storey and was castellated. The first bay in that section featured a large round headed opening with an ornate archivolt and square headed hood mould, and was fenestrated by an oriel window on the first floor and by a mullioned window on the second floor, while the right-hand bay was fenestrated by a mullioned and transomed window on the ground floor, a cross window on the first floor and a mullioned window on the second floor. Above the opening in the first bay in that section was the Duke's coat of arms, carved in stone. Internally, the principal rooms were a public hall, 64 feet (20 m) long and 34 feet (10 m) wide with capacity to seat 500 people, a courtroom to accommodate the magistrates' and county courts, a library, a reading room for the Bakewell and High Peak Institute, and rooms let to various bodies, including the local freemasons.

The complex was expanded within a short period. A solicitor's office, designed in the same style, was built to the north of the town hall, and a foundation stone for additional offices to the rear was laid by the Duke of Rutland's agent, Robert Nesfield, in May 1895. After Bakewell Urban District Council acquired the building in 1945, the Bakewell Town Hall Company was liquidated in 1946. The building continued to serve as the local seat of government until the enlarged West Derbyshire District Council was formed in 1974. The building was subsequently acquired by Bakewell Town Council, which continued to use it as its offices and meeting place. In 2005, the cast of the film, Pride and Prejudice, used the town hall as a dressing room, where they could put on their period costumes.

In 2008, the building was transferred under a long lease to the newly-formed Bakewell Town and Community Trust, which initiated an extensive programme of restoration works. It has since become a community events venue with concerts and theatre performances. Works of art in the town hall include a painting by Charles Beatson of Lieutenant Colonel Herbert Brooke-Taylor, who was chief recruiting officer for the Derbyshire District during the First World War.
