= Holme Hall, Bakewell =

Holme Hall
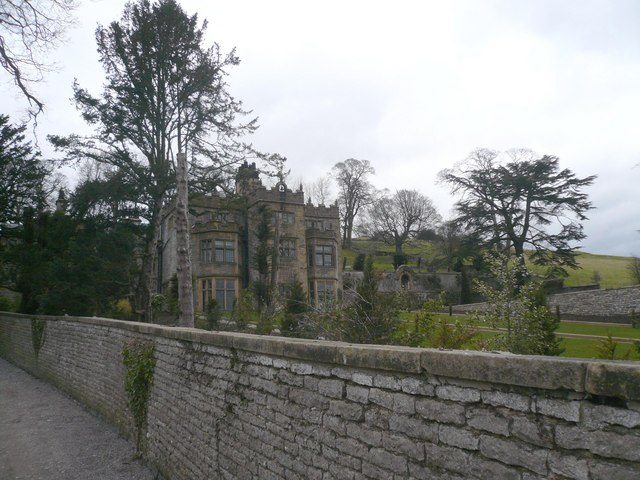
- Holme Hall: the south front

General information
- Status: Privately owned
- Type: Mansion
- Location: Holme Lane, Bakewell, United Kingdom
- Coordinates: 53.2186°N 1.6788°W
- Construction started: 1626 (with earlier sections)
- Completed: 1628

Listed Building – Grade I
- Official name: Holme Hall, Bakewell
- Designated: 13 March 1951
- Reference no.: 1246166

Holme Hall near Bakewell, Derbyshire, is a privately owned 17th-century country house. It is a Grade I listed building.

== History ==
The house was built, on the site of a previous manor house, in 1627 for Barnard Wells of Stoke Hall (Derbyshire), gentleman. His daughter Mary married Henry Bradshaw, brother of regicide John Bradshaw. Another daughter and coheiress married Robert Eyre and inherited Holme in 1658.

The original entrance front to the south has three storeys and three bays, the central one projecting to create a full-height entrance porch, and the outer bays having canted bay windows to second-floor height. The windows are transommed and mullioned and the parapets are crenellated. To the rear is a plainer three-storey four-bay block and to the right a late 17th-century lower block of three bays.

The Eyres held the manor until 1802 when the estate was sold under an order of Chancery to Robert Birch, who sold it in 1820 to Thomas John Gisborne, second son of Rev Thomas Gisborne of Yoxall. When Francis Gisborne died in 1881 the estate passed to his brother William Gisborne.

== See also ==
- Grade I listed buildings in Derbyshire
- Listed buildings in Bakewell
