= Bagshaw Hall =

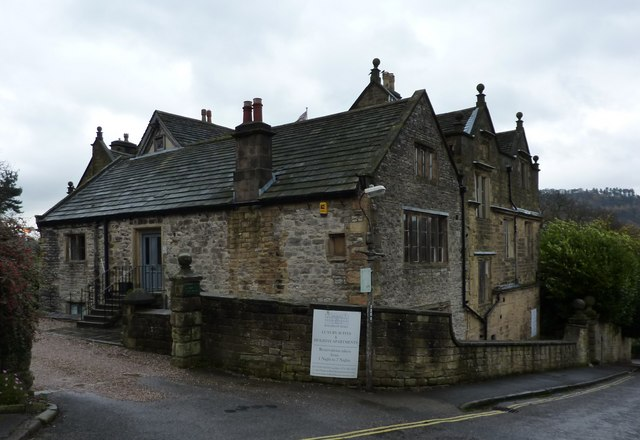
- Bagshaw Hall

- Location within Derbyshire
- 53°12′51″N 1°40′40″W
- Location: Bakewell, Derbyshire

Listed Building – Grade II*
- Official name: Bagshaw Hall
- Designated: 13 March 1951
- Reference no.: 1329979

Bagshaw Hall is a 17th-century grade II* listed country hall on Bagshaw Hill in Bakewell, Derbyshire.

== History ==
The hall was constructed by Thomas Bagshaw (1638–1721), a solicitor. Thomas was the son of Thomas Bagshawe of The Ridge in Chapel-en-le-Frith.

== See also ==
- Grade II* listed buildings in Derbyshire Dales
- Listed buildings in Bakewell
