= Bakewell War Memorial =

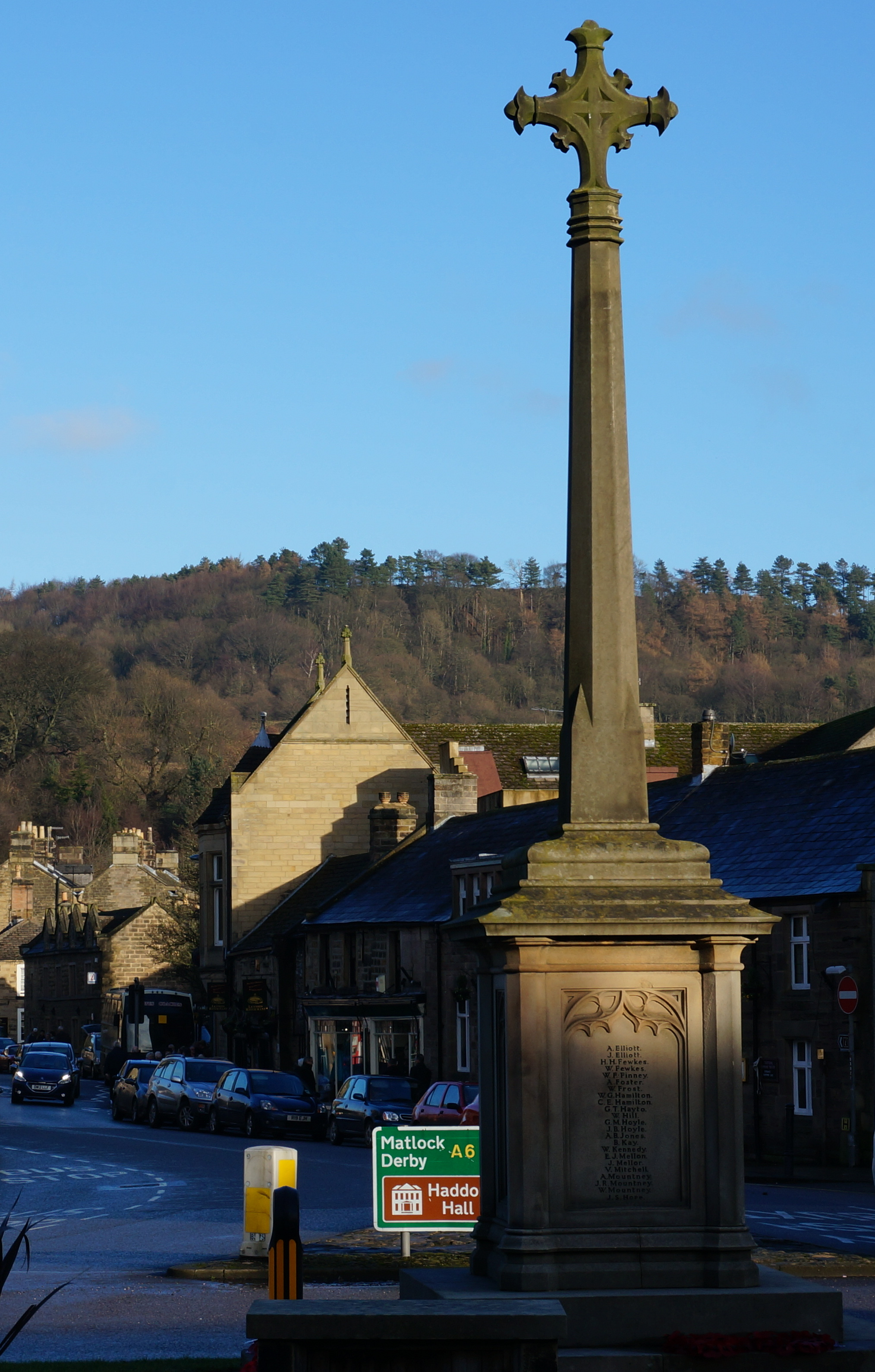
- Bakewell War Memorial

- Location in Derbyshire
- 53°12′47″N 1°40′33″W
- Location: Bakewell, Derbyshire, England

Listed Building – Grade II
- Official name: War Memorial
- Designated: 20 May 1974
- Reference no.: 1316485

Bakewell War Memorial is a 20th-century grade II listed war memorial in Bakewell, Derbyshire.

== History ==
The sandstone memorial is dedicated to the inhabitants of Bakewell that died during the First World War.

The memorial has been Grade II listed since 20 May 1974.

== See also ==
- Listed buildings in Bakewell
