= Bakewell Market Hall =

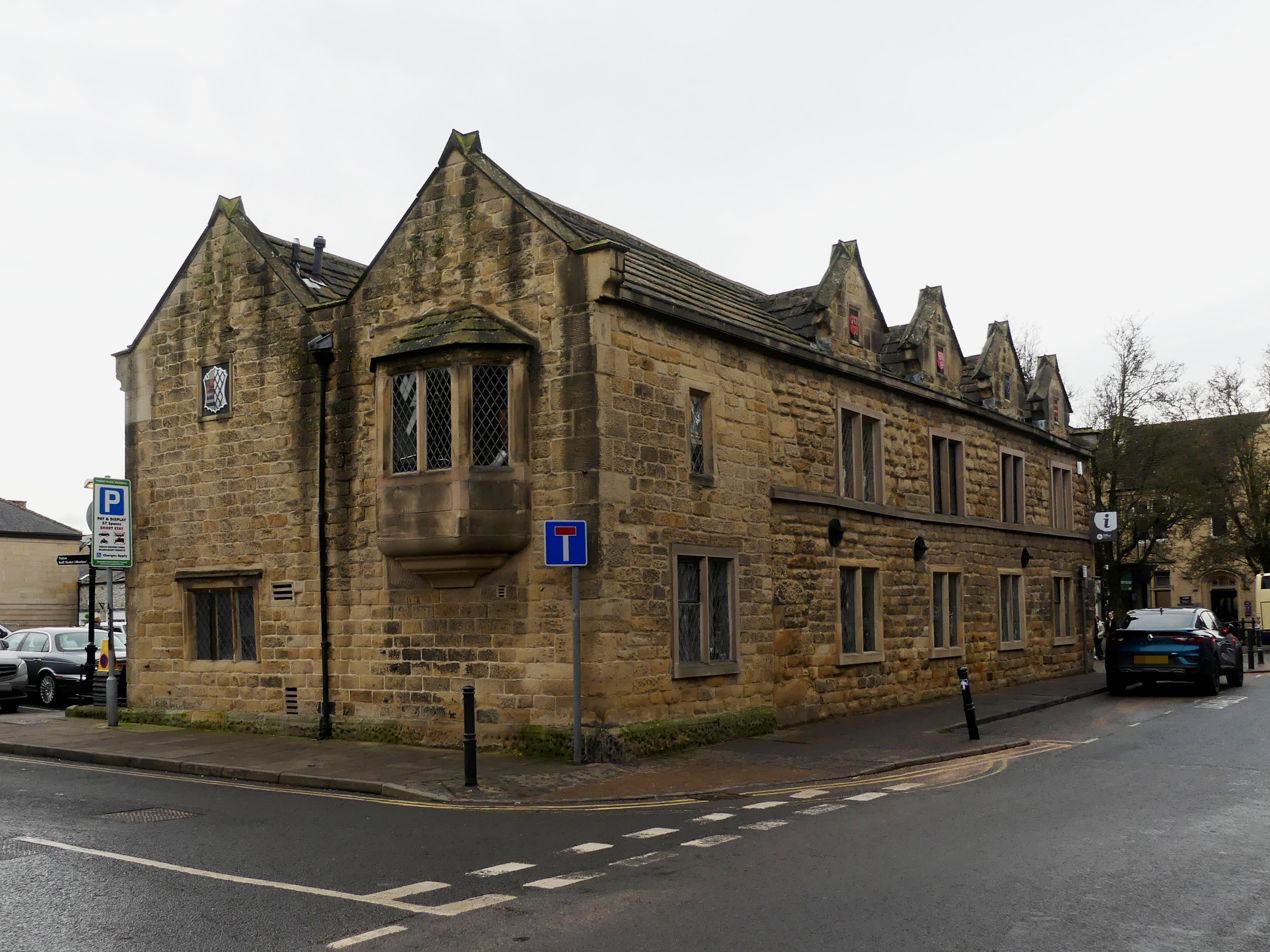
- The building, in 2022

- Location within Derbyshire
- 53.2137°N 1.6741°W
- Location: Bakewell, Derbyshire

Site notes
- Website: Bakewell Visitor Centre

Listed Building – Grade II
- Official name: Market Hall
- Designated: 13 March 1951
- Reference no.: 1148026

Bakewell Market Hall is a historic building in the town of Bakewell, in Derbyshire, in England.

The building was constructed in about 1600 as the town's market hall. Originally, the ground floor was partly open to the street, and the upper floor may have been timber framed. It was altered in the 18th century, with the ground floor arcade filled in. In 1827, the town's administration and courts moved from the Old Town Hall into the upper floor, while the lower floor served as a wash house. The building was extended to the east in 1858, at which time small gables were also added.

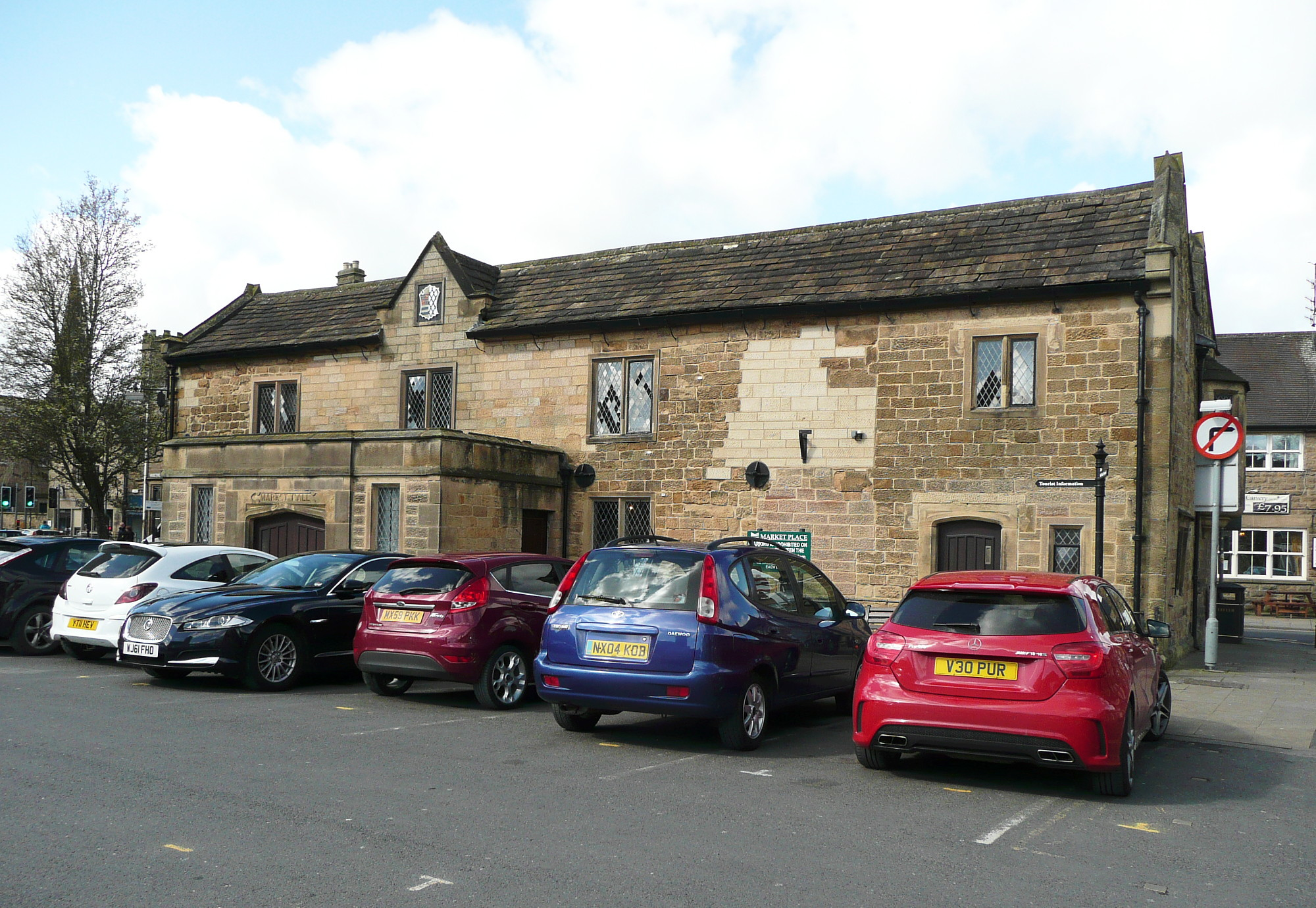
Rear of the building, in 2014

The council and courts moved into the new Bakewell Town Hall in 1890, and the building became a restaurant. Around this time, two shops were inserted on the west side of the ground floor, and in 1896, the west gable was rebuilt. Later, the building became a rating office, then a dance hall and a library, before becoming the town's tourist information centre. It was grade II listed in 1951.

The two-storey building is constructed of sandstone, and has a roof of stone slates. Its front is five bays wide, and most of its windows are mullioned and have leaded lights. The gables have painted shields. The entrance doorway has a Tudor arch. The left side has an oriel window.

== See also ==
- Listed buildings in Bakewell
