= Newholme Hospital =

- Derbyshire Community Health Services NHS Foundation Trust
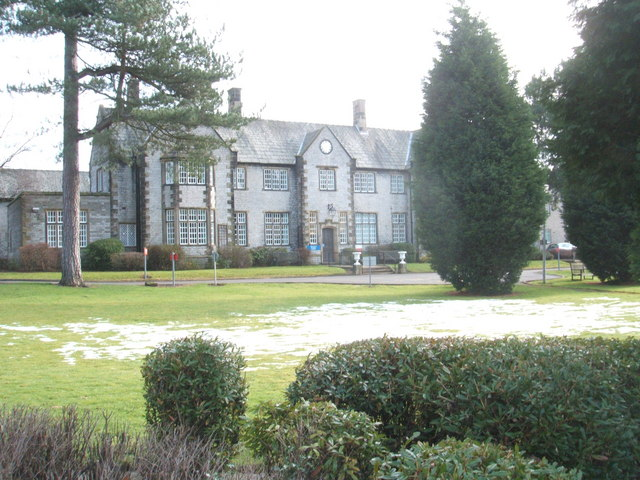
- Newholme Hospital

- Location in Derbyshire

Geography
- Location: Baslow Road, Bakewell, Derbyshire, England
- Coordinates: 53.2188°N 1.6723°W

Organisation
- Care system: NHS
- Type: Community

History
- Founded: 1841

Links
- Website: www.dchs.nhs.uk

Newholme Hospital is a community healthcare facility at Baslow Road in Bakewell, Derbyshire. It was managed by Derbyshire Community Health Services NHS Foundation Trust. It is a Grade II listed building.

== History ==
The facility, which was designed by a Mr Johnson of Sheffield in the Jacobean style, opened as Bakewell Union Workhouse in 1841. A large infirmary block was built to the rear of the site in 1900. It became the Bakewell Public Assistance Institution in 1930 and then joined the National Health Service as Newholme Hospital in 1948. Although it was announced in July 2017 that the hospital would close, it was confirmed, in December 2018, that a new health hub would be built on part of the site.

== See also ==
- Listed buildings in Bakewell
