= Old Town Hall, Bakewell =

Municipal building in Bakewell, Derbyshire, England

Old Town Hall
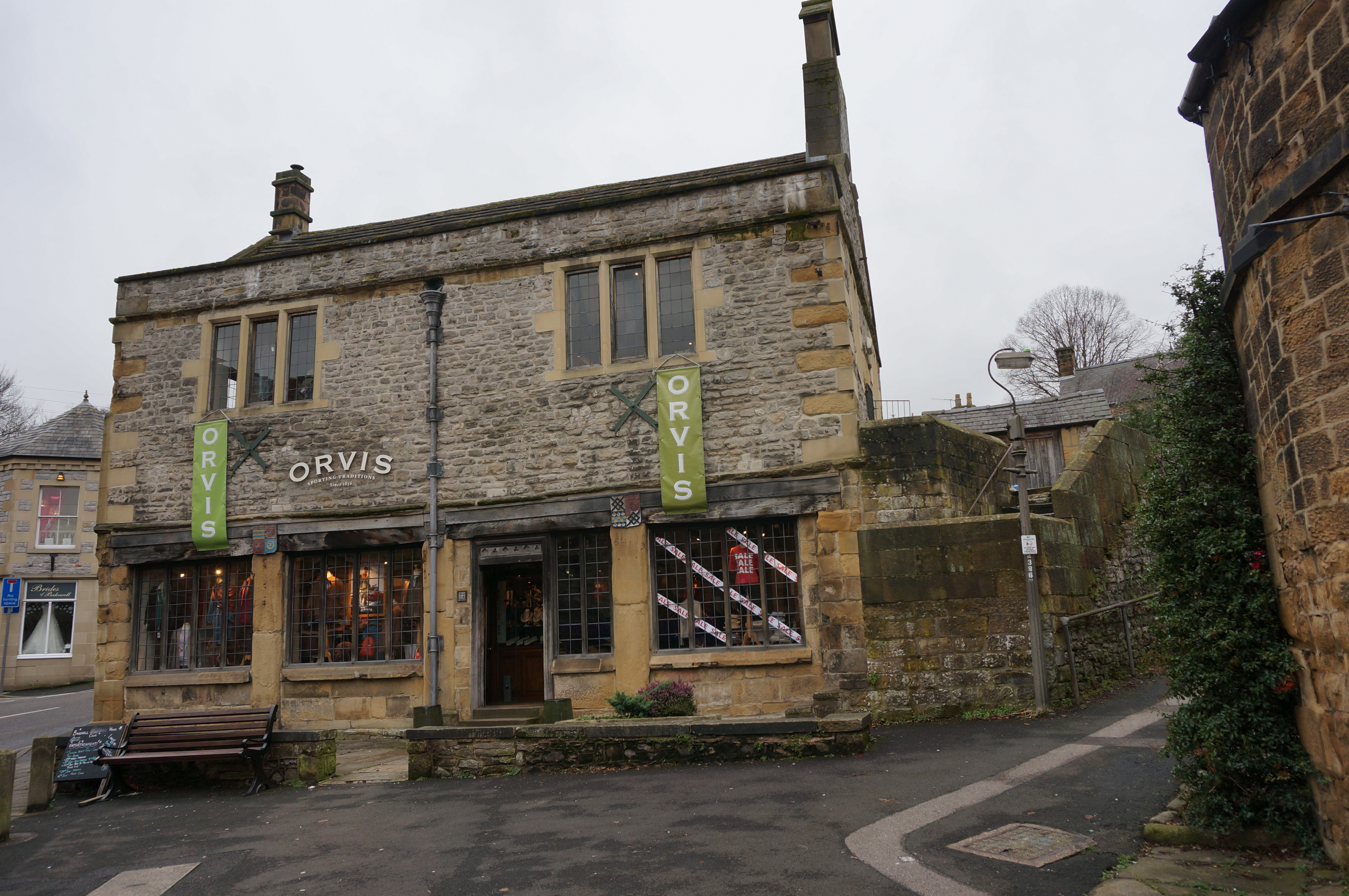
- The building in 2014

- Shown in Derbyshire
- 53.2126°N 1.6769°W
- Location: King Street, Bakewell

History
- Built: 1602

Site notes
- Architectural style: Neoclassical style

Listed Building – Grade II
- Official name: Old Town Hall The Buttermarket
- Designated: 13 March 1951
- Reference no.: 1246178

The Old Town Hall, also known as The Buttermarket, is a former municipal building in King Street, Bakewell, a town in Derbyshire, England. The building, which is currently in retail use, is a Grade II listed building.

== History ==
The building was commissioned by Sir John Manners (c. 1534–1611) of Haddon Hall, who was born the second son of Thomas Manners, 1st Earl of Rutland, in the early 17th century. The site he selected was occupied by a small chapel probably associated with the Guild of the Chantry of the Holy Cross. It was a prominent site, which faced down the hill towards the centre of the town.

The building was designed in the neoclassical style, built in limestone with sandstone dressings, and was completed in 1602, although it may include parts of the earlier chapel. The building was arcaded on the ground floor, so that markets could be held, with an assembly room on the first floor. The assembly room served as a town hall and courtroom, accommodating the petty sessions and the quarter sessions, while the lower floor accommodated St John's Hospital. In 1709, the hospital was relocated to new almshouses in South Church Street, and the old town hall was altered. The ground floor continued to be used as a buttermarket, but later also accommodated the local horse drawn fire engine.

In 1826, local municipal activities relocated to Bakewell Market Hall in Bridge Street. Lady Manners School, which had been co-located with the older Chantry School in South Church Street, relocated to the old town hall at that time. There were only nine boys when the school moved into the old town hall. When the headteacher, William Kay, died in 1874, the school closed. The assembly room became a working men's club in 1885, with a fishmonger's shop on the ground floor, and remained as such until 1964.

In 1966, the building was acquired by Maurice Goldstone, an antiques dealer from Sheffield, who refurbished it and gave the interior a medieval look, with refectory tables, chairs, and heraldic devices in the style of a manorial hall. By the early 21st century, the building was let to the American clothing business Orvis, although the company relocated to new premises on the opposite side of the road in December 2020. A firm of estate agents was subsequently appointed to secure new tenants.

== Architecture ==
The two-storey building is constructed of limestone, with sandstone dressings. It is two bays wide, with a wing at the rear, and external steps to the first floor. The walls of the ground floor are stone piers, with wooden leaded light windows between, and a studded wooden door just to the right of centre. The first floor has two restored windows with stone mullions. Inside, original oak beams survive, and there is a 20th-century staircase. At roof level, there is a parapet with ashlar coping and a small bellcote.

== See also ==
- Listed buildings in Bakewell
