= Burton Closes =

19th-century country house in Bakewell, Derbyshire, England

Coordinates: 53.2056°N 1.6713°W

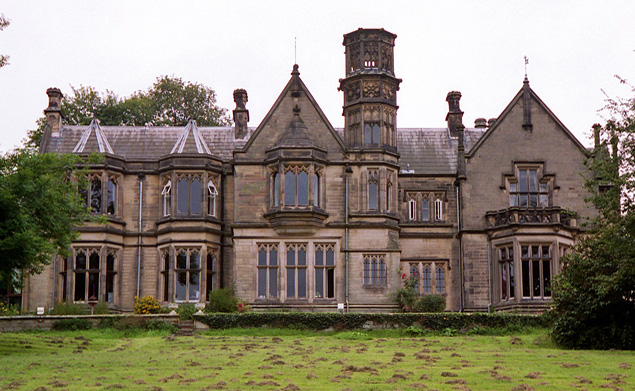
Burton Closes, 2012

Burton Closes is a 19th-century country house, now in use as a residential nursing home, situated at Haddon Road, Bakewell, Derbyshire. It is a Grade II* listed building.

The house was newly built in 1848 for John Allcard, a wealthy Quaker banker and stockbroker of Derby. It was originally built as a modest two bedroomed house, to a design by architect Joseph Paxton with interiors by Augustus Pugin and intended as a summer retreat. It was much extended by T D Barry and E W Pugin in 1856 for Allcard's son William, a railway engineer, best known for his 1830 work on the Sankey Viaduct, Warrington, Cheshire, where he was mayor in 1848 and 1851.

The Allcard family fortunes were much reduced by a financial downturn in 1866 and 1871 (when William Henry Allcard, a barrister, sold the estate).

Further improvements and extensions were made in 1888 by J B Mitchell Withers for the purchaser Smith Taylor-Whithead, who was High Sheriff of Derbyshire in 1894.
